= Browne family of Westport =

Anglo-Irish Family

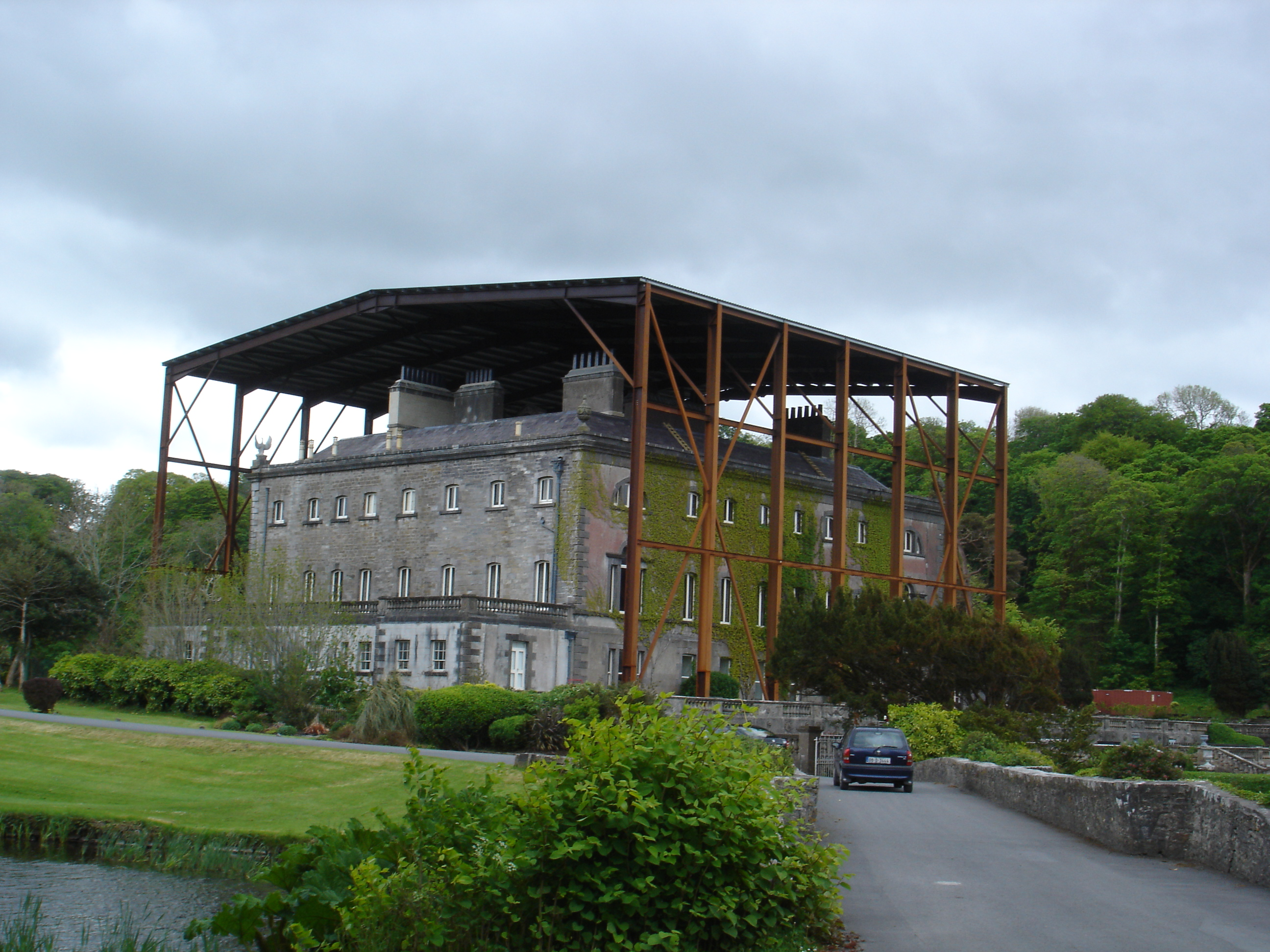
Westport House being repaired in 2007

The Browne family remained the owners of Westport House for almost three hundred years, until 17 January 2017.

The Browne family came to County Mayo from Sussex, England in the sixteenth century. Through marriage with the daughters of native Irish landowners and by purchase they built up a small estate near The Neale. As a Catholic family they were fortunate that their lands were situated in Connacht, thereby escaping the notorious confiscations of Oliver Cromwell.

John Browne III (1638–1711), a successful lawyer, became landlord at Westport following his marriage to The Hon. Maud Bourke, daughter of The 3rd Viscount Mayo and great-great-granddaughter of 'the Pirate Queen', Granuaile (Grace O'Malley; 1530–1603), in 1669. Browne greatly increased his estate in Mayo and Galway including Cahernamart (Cathair-na-Mart - the Fort of the Beeves), a ruinous O'Malley fortress on the shores of Clew Bay.

Browne's good fortune was soon swept away as Ireland was plunged into chaos in the Williamite Wars. A Catholic, he supported the Jacobite cause and was a Colonel in the Jacobite army. From the iron mines on his lands near Westport, he supplied the army with cannonballs and weapons. The defeat of the Jacobite army at Aughrim and Limerick in 1691 brought financial ruin in the confiscations that followed. At his death in 1711 his estate was reduced to a modest mansion at Cahernamart and a few hundred acres. The Penal Laws which followed left his grandson, John Brown IV, with little option but to conform to the prevailing religion in the hope of surviving the confiscations and political upheaval.

Browne gradually revived the family fortune. Young and ambitious, he set about extending his estate and transforming the old O'Malley castle into modern-day Westport House. He replaced the old village of Cathair-na-Mart with a new town of Westport, where he established a thriving linen industry. An excellent farmer, he set about improving the fertility of his lands, which, for the most part, were of poor quality. In 1771, he was created The 1st Earl of Altamont. In 1752, his son and heir, Peter, 2nd Earl of Altamont, married the heiress, Elizabeth Kelly from County Galway, whose estates in Jamaica further enhanced the family fortune.

John, 3rd Earl of Altamont, continued the innovative farming tradition of his grandfather. He created the lake to the west of Westport House, planted trees and employed James Wyatt to decorate the gallery and dining room. He laid out the principal streets of the present town of Westport, and many of the streets in Westport today are named after Browne family members such as Peter Street, James Street, Altamont Street and John's Row. He also established a theatre at The Octagon and built the town of Louisburgh. In 1787, he married Louisa Catherine, daughter and heiress of the English Earl Howe. During his lifetime the French-inspired 1798 Rebellion occurred. Aided by the arbitrary actions of Denis Browne, his younger brother, against the Irish insurgents (which earned him the reputation of 'black sheep' of the family), the Rebellion was crushed. The 3rd Lord Altamont was created The 1st Marquess of Sligo after the Act of Union in 1800. He seldom attended Parliament in London, being more content at home in Westport.

His only son Howe Browne, 2nd Marquess of Sligo, inherited in 1809 at the age of twenty-one. Extravagant and generous, his early life subscribed to the popular image of a 'regency buck'. Friend of Byron, de Quincy and the Prince Regent, he travelled extensively throughout Europe. He excavated at Mycenae and discovered the 3,000-year-old columns of the Treasury of Atreus. To bring them back to Westport, he took some seamen from a British warship and was subsequently sentenced to four months in Newgate Prison. He married Lady Hester de Burgh, the Earl of Clanricarde's daughter, by whom he had fourteen children, and settled down to life in Westport. The 2nd Lord Sligo added the north and south wings, the library, and commissioned much furniture, china, silver and paintings for the House. He bred racehorses both at Westport and at the Curragh. One of his horses, Waxy, won the Derby. He owned the last two of the breed of Irish Wolfhound. In 1834, he was appointed Governor of Jamaica with the difficult task of overseeing the 'apprenticeship system', in a period prior to the full emancipation of the slaves. He met with great opposition from plantation owners and other vested interests. He was the first to emancipate the slaves on the family's Jamaican plantations. The first 'free village' in the world, Sligoville, was subsequently named in his honour. A liberal, he was one of the few Irish peers to vote for Catholic Emancipation. He died in 1845 as the clouds of the Great Famine descended over Mayo.

His son, George, 3rd Marquess of Sligo, inherited a terrible legacy. The West of Ireland was worst affected by the famine. Westport House was closed and with no rents forthcoming, the 3rd Lord Sligo borrowed where he could, spending £50,000 of his own money to alleviate the suffering of the tenants. He imported cargoes of meal to Westport Quay and subvented the local workhouse, then the only shelter available to the destitute. He wrote tirelessly to the British Government, demanding that they do more to help the famine victims. He wrote and had published a pamphlet outlining many pioneering reforms of the economic conditions that had led to the famine. In 1854, on being offered the Order of St Patrick, an honour once held by his father and grandfather, disillusioned by Britain's Irish policy (a recurring sentiment at Westport House), the 3rd Marquess wrote 'I have no desire for the honour.' In 1878 he married Isobel Peyronnet and moved to Surrey for the rest of his life as she did not care for Westport.

Lord John Browne succeeded his brother as 4th Marquess of Sligo in 1896. He had to contend with the huge changes that occurred in the ownership of land in Ireland in the late nineteenth and early twentieth century. Above all he was a 'professional' farmer, whose main contribution was to transform a reduced and almost bankrupt estate into a profitable one, solely from agriculture. He had repairs done to the house and gardens.

Henry Ulick Browne, 5th Marquess of Sligo (1831–1913), another brother of the 3rd and 4th Marquesses, succeeded on the death of the fourth Marquess. He had by then retired from his career in the Indian Civil Service. He had been much at Westport since his retirement in 1889 and he and his wife occupied the big house, while the Fourth Marquess, a batchelor, lived in his own small house.

George Browne, 6th Marquess of Sligo succeeded his father in 1913. An active man, he rebuilt the stable block and made the terraces above the lake on the west side of the house.. HE installed central heating, electric light and six bathrooms, and ensured the house was in a good state of repair. He added a sawmill, planted Sitka spruce and a salmon hatchery at the fisheries a salmon hatchery and planted extensively. He also modernised the interior of the House and created the Italianate terrace to the west.

Ulick de Burgh Browne, 7th Marquess of Sligo succeeded his father in 1935. He inherited a house in fine condition and workmen with a tradition who could tackle any job. He died at Westport in 1941 and for four years life there was frozen. The Sixth Marchioness, in her eighties left London and lived in Westport until the end of the war.

Arthur Howe Browne succeeded as 8th Marquess in 1941 at the age of 74. A younger son of a younger son he earned a living in the British Army. He came home in 1945. The compulsory acquisition of the town lawns for local public housing occurred in the time of the 8th Marquess, which altered the historic relationship that had existed between the House and town of Westport. He was succeeded by his brother Terence, 9th Marquess who died in England a year later.

Denis, 10th Marquess of Sligo, succeeded his uncle in 1953. He and his wife, Jose Gauche, found the extensive farmlands unprofitable. The plan was to open the house to the paying public although this would be the first house on Ireland to try this. First Jose Browne had to go through each room discarding the detritus gathered over centuries. She and her husband were both artists and Connaught area was not known for its tourism in the 1950s. She was able to design and make furnishing fabrics to suit the Westport House rooms as she had always made her own clothes and her own accessories. She crocheted bedspreads to decorate the beds and she is credited with being the house's chatelaine and its interior designer. The 11th Marquess was to then lead the business. He died in 2014.

The Browne family reluctantly put Westport House on the market in 2016 and sold it to the Hughes family, a local business group, on 17 January 2017, ending the long links that bound Westport House to the Browne family. The Hughes family committed to improving the facilities and to the possibility of expansion.

== Browne family slavery links ==
Some members of the Browne family were at various times slave and plantation owners in Jamaica. A prominent slave-owning head of the family was Howe Browne, 2nd Marquess of Sligo and his wife, Lady Sligo (Lady Hester Catherine de Burgh). The 2nd Marquess served as Governor of Jamaica from 1834 to 1836.

An exhibition at Westport House styles the 2nd Marquess of Sligo as 'Champion of the Slaves', a suggestion that one historian refers to as 'hyperbole', pointing out that "Browne benefited from slavery from the cradle to the grave and did not free his slaves until the institution of slavery was abolished by an act of parliament". The 2nd Lord Sligo also claimed, and received, substantial compensation from the British Government for the loss of his slaves.

Browne was said to be both famous and infamous in his lifetime. He spent the latter part of his life fighting against slavery both as Governor General of Jamaica and afterwards in the House of Lords. He is known in the history of Jamaica for founding the first free slave village in the world and Sligoville, in Jamaica, is still named for him as of 2023.

The Jamaican plantations ('Kellys pen' and 'Cocoa Walk') and slave workers, originally came into Browne family ownership through the marriage in 1752 of Peter Browne to Elizabeth Kelly, only daughter and heir of Dennis Kelly from County Galway, who became Chief Justice of Jamaica in the 18th century.

== See also ==
- Westport House
- Hazelwood House, Sligo
