= Harvest Country Music Festival =

2017 music festival in Ireland and Northern Ireland

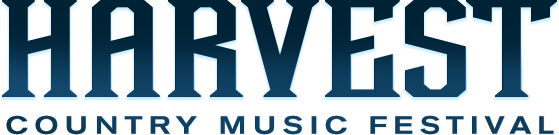
- Genre: country music
- Dates: 26–27 August 2017
- Locations: Westport House, Westport, County Mayo, Republic of Ireland. St. Angelo Airport, Trory, Enniskillen, County Fermanagh, Northern Ireland
- Years active: 2017
- Website: http://www.harvestcountrymusicfestival.com/

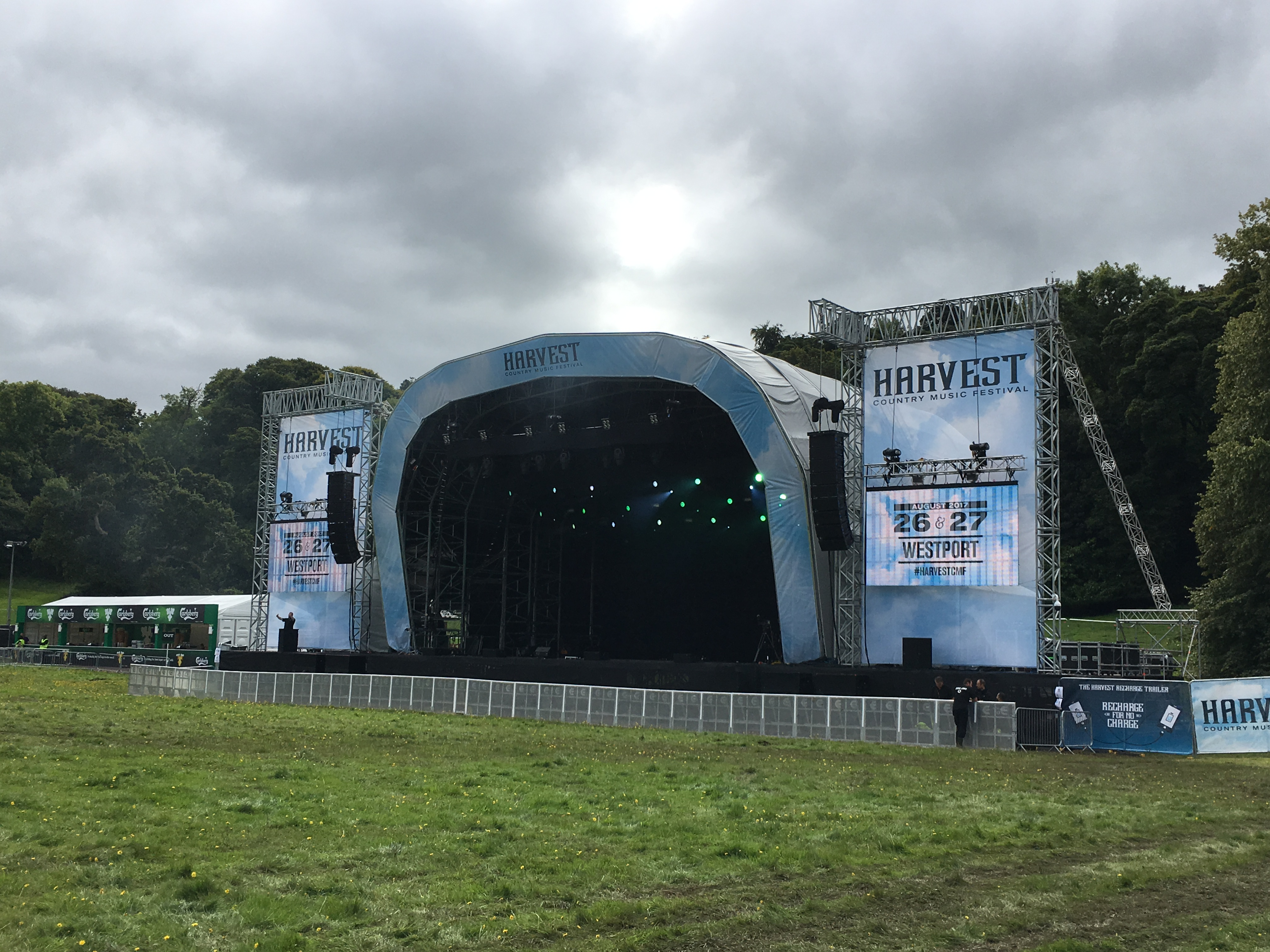
The Main Stage at Westport House

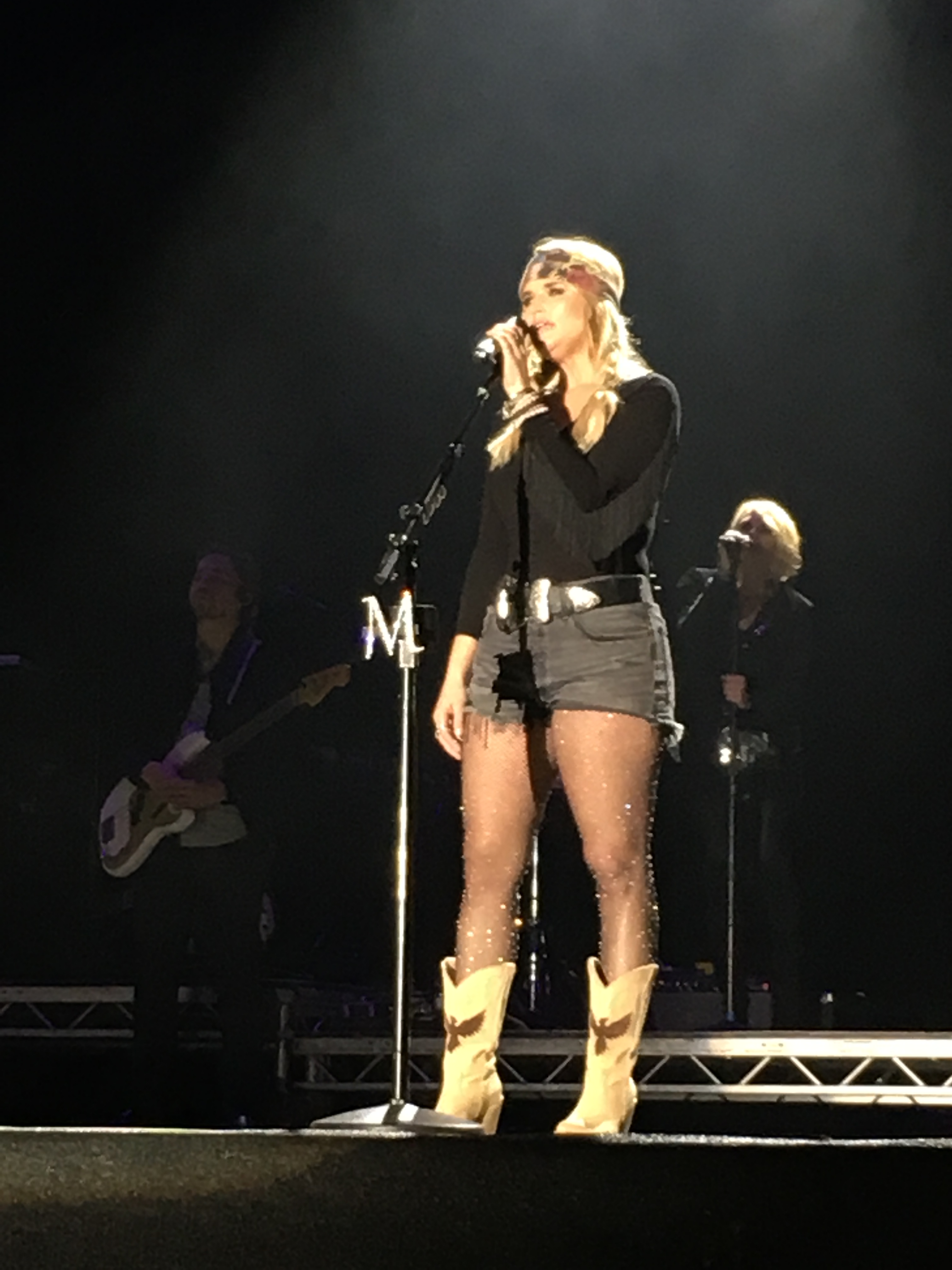
Miranda Lambert headlining Sunday at Westport House

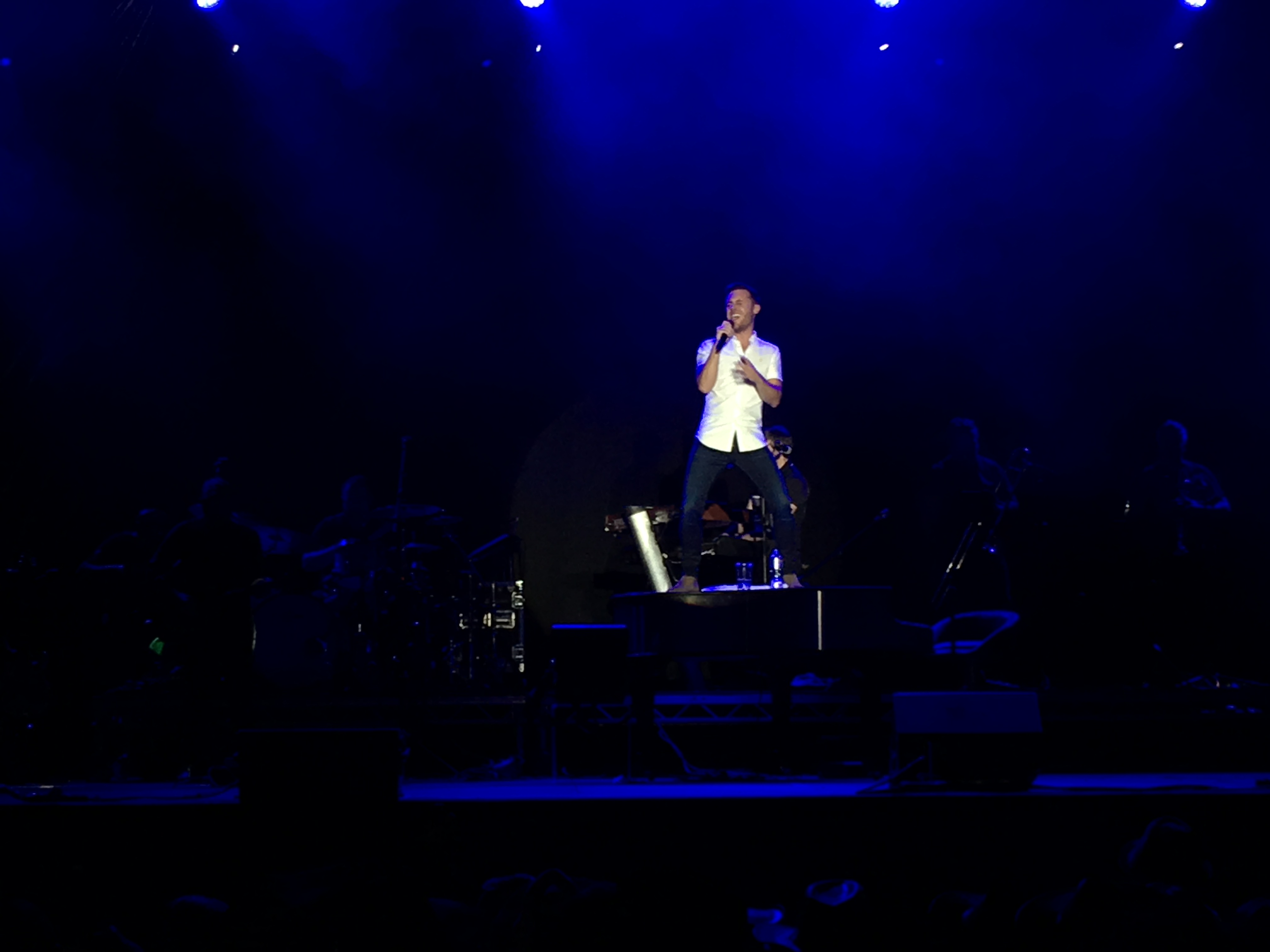
Nathan Carter headlining at Westport House on the Saturday

Harvest Country Music Festival was a country music festival which took place for the first time on Saturday 26th and Sunday 27 August 2017, organised and promoted by Aiken Promotions.

Aiken Promotions announced the new festival in December 2016. along with headline acts Miranda Lambert and Nathan Carter. Shortly after the announcement, additional camping facilities were added due to demand

The event was held simultaneously at two locations, sharing the same line-up with artists performing at one location on Saturday and then swapping on Sunday. The locations were Westport House in Westport, County Mayo, Republic of Ireland, and St. Angelo Airport at Trory, just outside Enniskillen, in County Fermanagh, Northern Ireland.

St. Angelo Airport predicted crowd numbers of 15,000 for the weekend and tickets were available on the day at both venues

== 2017 Line up ==
=== Headliners ===
Miranda Lambert included Harvest Festival in the European leg of her Highway Vagabond Tour - the only dates in Ireland and Northern Ireland.

Nathan Carter was the headliner for the other night of the festival.

Charlie Pride was added as a 'very special guest' in April 2017

=== Other Acts ===
The festival featured a range of Country Music artists from Ireland, the UK and America.

The Shires had been due to play however were forced to cancel at short notice due to illness. Logan Brill was moved up the running order to fill their time slot.

=== Full line up & stage times ===
| | Westport House (Saturday) Enniskillen Airport (Sunday) | Westport House (Sunday) Enniskillen Airport (Saturday) |
|---|---|---|
| Main Stage | 21:00 Nathan Carter 19:30 Kip Moore 18:00 Dan + Shay 16:30 ~~The Shires~~ (Cancelled) 15:00 Donna Taggart 14:00 Logan Brill | 21:00 Miranda Lambert 19:30 Charlie Pride 18:00 Maddie & Tae 16:30 Ward Thomas 15:00 Hurricane Highway 13:45 Cliona Hagan |
| Vicar Street Stage | 20:00 Catherine McGrath 19:00 Courtney Marie Andrews 17:45 Jarrrod Dickenson 16:30 Megan O'Neill 15:15 The Grey Willows | 20:00 Mo Pitney 19:00 Sam Palladio 18:00 Una Healy 16:45 All our Exes Live In Texas 15:30 Frankie Davies |
| Roadhouse Stage | 20:00 Jake Carter 19:00 Dancing (DJ) 18:00 Niamh Lynn 17:00 Dancing (DJ) 16:00 Barry Kirwan 15:00 Dancing (DJ) | 20:00 Cliona Hagan 19:00 Dancing (DJ) 18:00 Lee Mathews 17:00 Dancing (DJ) 16:00 Riah Butler 15:00 Dancing (DJ) |
| Harvest Cafe | Sessions at 14:00, 16:00 & 18:00 featuring: Don Mescall Victoria Shaw Megan O'Neill Stephanie Urbina Jones | Sessions at 14:00, 16:00 & 18:00 featuring: Earl Bud Lee Pete Kennedy Riah Butler Justin McGurk |

Stage Times were publicised via the website and Twitter on 22 August

== See also ==
- List of country music festivals
- List of folk festivals
