= Herbert Richard Browne =

Indian Military officer and administrator (1858–1890)

Captain Herbert Richard Browne B.S.C

Political officer of the North Lushai Hills
- In office 1 May 1890 – 9 September 1890
- Monarch: Queen Victoria
- Governor General: Lord Lansdowne
- Prime Minister: Robert Gascoyne-Cecil, 3rd Marquess of Salisbury
- Preceded by: Position Created
- Succeeded by: Robert Blair McCabe

Personal details
- Born: October 11, 1858 Chinsurah, Hooghly, West Bengal, India
- Died: September 9, 1890 (aged 31) Changsil, Cachar, British Raj
- Cause of death: Killed in action (Lushai Rising)
- Resting place: Royal Memorial Chapel
- Parent(s): Henry Browne, 5th Marquess of Sligo (Father); Catherine Henrietta Browne (b. Dicken, Mother)
- Education: Royal Military College, Sandhurst
- Profession: Bengal Staff Corps
- Known for: First political officer of the North Lushai Hills

Military service
- Allegiance: United Kingdom
- Branch/service: Army
- Rank: Captain
- Unit: Shropshire Light Infantry
- Battles/wars: Second Anglo-Afghan War; Lushai Rising

Captain Herbert Richard Browne (Lushai: Hmaireka, lit. 'pinched face', 11 October 1858 – 9 September 1890) was a British military officer and the first political officer of the North Lushai Hills. Browne was tasked with pacifying the Lushai Hills until he was betrayed by Khalkam and killed on transit to Changsil.

== Early life ==
Herbert Richard Browne was born on 11 October 1858 to Henry Browne, 5th Marquess of Sligo and Catherine Henrietta Browne in Hooghly District, West Bengal. Herbert was the third oldest child among his nine siblings. He had four brothers, George Browne, Arthur Browne, Terence Maurice Browne and Alfred Eden Browne. His five sisters were Catherine Elizabeth Browne, Edith Hester Charles, Florence Marion Beresford-ash, Norah More and Alice Evelyn Mahon.

He would rank lieutenant after becoming a gentleman cadet from the Royal Military College, Sandhurst. His first assignment was to the 70th (Surrey) Regiment of Foot as the second lieutenant. Later on, Browne would join the Shropshire Light Infantry before being appointed a probationer of the Indian Staff Corps in 1882. Browne would also participate in the Second Anglo-Afghan War where he would earn a medal.

== Career ==
Herbert Richard Browne was the Assistant Commissioner of Assam since 1883. He was reassigned in May 1890 as the Political Officer of the North Lushai Hills. He was granted a salary of ₹1,000 a month. Browne's headquarters were established at Fort Aijal. His responsibilities as a political officer concerned with establishing political influence and control over the unruly Lushai chiefs annexed by the Chin-Lushai expedition. The northern boundaries of Browne's jurisdiction were demarcated as the territory enclosed between the Cachar border, Hill Tipperah border and Manipur River, with an imaginary border for the Southern Lushai Hills demarcated via the Darlung Peak. The Chief Commissioner also prompted Browne to cooperate with Fort Lungleh, Fort Tregear and Fort White by raising concern over the numerical strengths of Lushai tribes. Browne's first task upon arriving at Fort Aijal was to capture Lengpunga, the chief responsible for the Chengri Valley raid, and recommend suggestions fitting his punishment to the commissioner. The creation of his office also oversaw the office of the Deputy Commissioner of Cachar transferred to him.

As part of his military strategy of pacifying the Lushai Hills Browne committed to reopening the old Changsil bazaar and extended it to Sairang Bazaar and Fort Aijal. As the Lushai Hills were annexed Browne assigned British troops to guard the markets and give merchants confidence to trade with the Lushais instead of assigning and negotiating the responsibility with the chiefs in old policy. To prevent loss of the merchants only five shops were opened in 1890. Five local men were assigned to supervise and set prices of the goods and products in the bazaars. Zou argues that Brown liberalized the trade in the Lushai Hills to rebuild market and trade while maintaining a paternal role of implementing necessary regulations. Browne would subsequently warn the ethnic groups in neighbouring areas such as Manipur to not act hostile towards the Lushais who were now British subjects.

The Western Lushai chiefs who were related to Lengpunga did not wish to supply either labour or taxes to the British administration and opposed the punishment of Lengpunga. Browne held a durbar for the western Lushai chiefs, namely the sons of Sukpilal. Each chief furthermore brought 20 subjects to the meeting. Browne attempted to discuss peace terms, but the chiefs did not accept them. The meeting was held on the hill of the present day Aizawl Fire brigade while Browne and his officers were in the fortress above Baza (Bagpipe) Hill at the time. The Mizo chiefs suggested that Browne should come to them alone without any soldiers which Browne agreed to. Browne met with 1000 Mizo warriors with rifles lined in front of the Baza Hill fortress. As a result, the street later built there was named "Zarkawt" (a file of warriors). Browne gained the Lushai exonym Hmaireka due to many Mizo observing that his eyes were fixed on the path before him and rarely looked left or right. Browne was said to sit on a quilt carpet seat. Captain Browne held a second Durbar of Chiefs on 14 June 1890 after the first one in May failed, and he declared that Lengpunga's chieftainship would be deposed for four years as punishment for his conduct on the Chengri Valley raid and that he was to be fined 30 guns. Lengpunga was replaced by his son Suaknuna. Browne would subsequently announce the new British policies. Raiding was now prohibited, freedom of movement must be granted to British government employees and military forces and cessation of the chief's right to tax traders and merchants in their territory. A feast was held with a mithun killed as the terms were agreed to. Browne allied the western Lushai chief Khalkam with an oath of fealty with Browne. However, the introduction of taxes and the restrictions on hunting in their territory infuriated Khalkam, who decided to revolt against British rule. Khalkam would hold a meeting with Western Lushai chiefs in his Zawlbuk and plan an uprising with the support of Thangula, Thamruma, Lenkhunga, Lalrima, Mingthang and Rankupa.

== Death ==
On 9 April 1890, Browne travelled to Changsil outpost from Fort Aijal with a small party of sepoys. Khalkam used his influence to get a subordinate chief, Thansuma, to arrange a war party to ambush his travel while Khalkam's brother Thanruma met with Browne to collect information on his destination to inform the war party. On the path two miles away from the Changsil outpost, Browne and his party were at a junction of roads from Fort Aijal and Khalkam's village. The coolies were first to hear the gunshots fired at this position. The war party armed with guns and daos surrounded Browne and attacked. The result of the ambush saw three of Browne's men killed. Browne himself was stabbed in the arm with three severe wounds and excessive bleeding. As a result of this, Browne was mortally wounded. One survivor managed to escape the ambush and inform the officials at Changsil. Browne was brought to the Changsil soon after but died within 15 minutes of arrival. Thansuma and Lenkhunga were responsible for the murder of Captain Browne, with Khalkam liable for his involvement and conspiracy.

According to Mizo recounts, the followers of Browne's party were shot first. Chief Saithawma who had been deposed of his chieftainship exclaimed to let a chief fight another chief as he shot Browne who was mounted on his horse. The wounding on Browne led him to fall off his horse. With great difficulty Browne managed to reach Changsil outpost where he died. The famous Pasalṭha, Khuangchera was originally assigned to the ambush but couldn't make it due to following a tradition regarding family matters.

Browne's office would be filled by R.B McCabe, the deputy commissioner of Lakhimpur whose reputation for pacifying the Ao Nagas was well known and recorded.

== Sources ==
- Chatterjee, Suhas (1985). British rule in Mizoram. New Delhi: Mittal Publications.
- Chatterjee, Suhas (2009). Frontier Officers in Colonial Northeast India. New Delhi: Akansha Publishing. ISBN 978-81-8370-168-6.
- Horn, Alasdair. "Herbert Richard Browne". MyHeritage.
- Chatterjee, Subhas (1995). Mizo Chiefs and the Chiefdom. New Delhi: M D Publications PVT LTD. ISBN 81-85880-72-7.
- National Archives of India. "Rising in Lushai Land- Excellent service uncleared by Surgeon H.B. Melville". Indian Ministry of Culture. Ministry of Culture.
- McCall, Anthony Gilchrist (1949). Lushai Chrysalis. London: Luzac.
- Reid, Robert (1942). The Lushai Hills: culled from History of the frontier areas bordering on Assam from 1883–1941. Calcutta: Firma KLM. p. 49.
- Sen, Anandaroop (2022). "Insurgent Law: Bengal Regulation III and the Chin-Lushai Expeditions (1872–1898)" (PDF). Modern Asian Studies. 56 (1): 1515–1555. doi:10.1017/S0026749X21000366.
- Zorema, J. (2007). Indirect Rule in Mizoram: 1890-1954. New Delhi: Mittal Publications. ISBN 978-81-8324-229-5. OCLC 271837683. OL 48056042M.
- Zou, S. Thangboi (2019). "Riverine bazaars, trade and chiefs in the colonial Lushai Hills". Asian Ethnicity. 22 (4): 563–582. doi:10.1080/14631369.2019.1687284.
- Evening Mail (26 February 1913). "Lord Sligo". Evening Mail.
- Naval & Military Gazette and Weekly Chronicle of the United Service (3 October 1883). "Naval and Military Gazette". Naval & Military Gazette and Weekly Chronicle of the United Service.
- London Daily Chronicle (3 April 1882). "Regimental District". London Daily Chronicle.
- Dublin Daily Express (12 June 1878). "Naval and Military Gazette". Dublin Daily Express.
- Bart, Archibald Douglas Stewart (4 October 1890). "Obituary". The London Illustrated News. No. 2685.
- Lalthangliana, B. (2005). Culture and Folklore of Mizoram. India: Publicans Division, Ministry of information and broadcasting.
