= Laragh =

Laragh may refer to:

Northern Ireland

- Laragh, County Tyrone, a townland in County Tyrone
- Laragh (Kinawley), a townland in County Fermanagh
- Laragh (Rossory), a townland in County Fermanagh
- Laragh (Trory), a townland in County Fermanagh

Republic of Ireland

- Laragh, County Cavan
- Laragh, County Monaghan
- Laragh, County Wicklow
- Laragh, Kilcumreragh, a townland in the barony of Moycashel, County Westmeath
- Laragh, Kilmacnevan, a townland in the barony of Moygoish, County Westmeath
