= Denis Browne, 10th Marquess of Sligo =

Irish peer (1908–1991)

The Most Honourable The Marquess of Sligo
- Born: Denis Edward Browne; 13 December 1908
- Died: 11 September 1991 (aged 82)
- Spouse: Jose Gauche
- Parent(s): Captain Lord Alfred Eden Browne; Cicely Wormald
- Relatives: Jeremy Browne

Denis Edward Browne, 10th Marquess of Sligo (13 December 1908 – 11 September 1991), known as Denis Browne until 1952, was an Irish peer.

== Life ==
Browne was the son of Captain Lord Alfred Eden Browne, the fifth son of Henry Browne, 5th Marquess of Sligo. His mother was Cicely Wormald, daughter of Edward Wormald. In 1952 he succeeded his uncle in the marquessate.

Lord Sligo married Jose Gauche, daughter of William Gauche, in 1930. In 1982 his book Westport House and the Brownes was published. He died in September 1991, aged 82, and was succeeded by his son, Jeremy Browne, 11th Marquess of Sligo.

== Arms ==
Coat of arms of Denis Browne, 10th Marquess of Sligo
Crest An eagle, displayed, vert. Escutcheon Sable, three lions, passant, in bend, argent, between four bendlets, of the last. Supporters Dexter, a talbot, proper, gorged with a baron’s coronet ; Sinister, a horse, argent Motto Suivez raison (Follow reason).

Peerage of Ireland
Preceded by Terence Morris Browne	Marquess of Sligo; 1952–1991	Succeeded by Jeremy Ulick Browne
