= Ballycassidy =

Village in County Fermanagh, Northern Ireland

Coordinates: 54.40°N 7.65°W

Ballycassidy: Irish: Baile Uí Chaiside
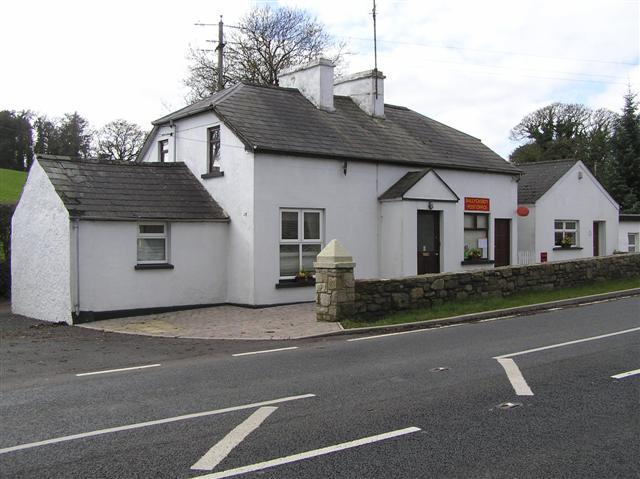
- Ballycassidy Post Office

- Location within Northern Ireland
- Population: 90 (2001 Census)
- District: Fermanagh and Omagh
- County: County Fermanagh
- Country: Northern Ireland
- Sovereign state: United Kingdom
- Postcode district: BT
- Dialling code: 028
- UK Parliament: Fermanagh and South Tyrone
- NI Assembly: Fermanagh and South Tyrone

Ballycassidy (from Irish Baile Uí Chaiside, meaning 'O’Cassidy’s townland') is a small village and townland (of 83 acres) in County Fermanagh, Northern Ireland, 6.5 km north of Enniskillen on the eastern shore of Lower Lough Erne. It is situated in the civil parish of Trory and the historic barony of Tirkennedy. In the 2001 Census it had (with Laragh and Trory) a population of 315 people. It is situated within Fermanagh and Omagh district.

Ballycassidy is a small rural community, consisting mainly of scattered homes, the Balcas Sawmill and rich farm land along the Ballycassidy River. There is no pub or grocery store, only a post office. The Ballycassidy River flows into Lower Lough Erne a short distance to the west.

== History ==
In the 14th century, there was a church in Ballycassidy. A holy well in the area was associated with Saint Molaise who founded the monastery on nearby Devinish.

== Ballycassidy racehorse ==
There is also a racehorse called Ballycassidy, named after the village, who was trained in Wales by Peter Bowen. The horse is notorious for a spectacular fall at Valentines Brook in the 2006 Grand National at Aintree. He won 16 races over his career and became a favourite with racing fans. He was retired from racing under rules in 2008, but did go on to race in Point to Points, ridden by the then amateur jockey Donal Devereux. Ballycassidy remains at the Peter Bowen stables.

== Gallery ==
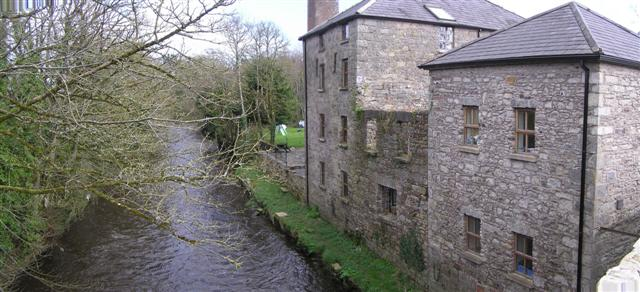
Mill building
