= Francis Hurst =

Irish Anglican priest

Francis James Hurst (1835 – 7 March 1906) was an Irish Anglican priest in the late nineteenth and early twentieth centuries: he was Archdeacon of Clogher from 1903 until 1906.

Hurst was born in County Monaghan. He was educated at Trinity College, Dublin and ordained in 1859. He served curacies at Trory and Tydavnet. He was the incumbent at Clabby from 1873 until 1906.

He died at Vicar's Dale, in Carrickmacross, County Monaghan, aged 71.
