= RAF St Angelo =

RAF St Angelo No. 18 SLG
- Trory, County Fermanagh in Northern Ireland
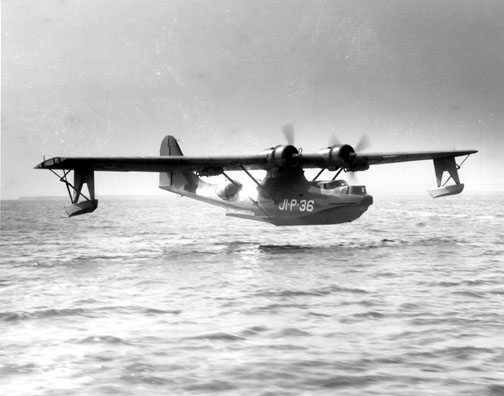
- Catalina flying boat of the type based at St Angelo during the Second World War

Site information
- Type: Royal Air Force Station
- Owner: Air Ministry
- Operator: Royal Air Force
- Controlled by: RAF Coastal Command

Location
- Shown within Northern Ireland RAF St Angelo (the United Kingdom)
- Coordinates: 54°23′55″N 007°39′07″W

Site history
- Built: 1940
- In use: 1941-1947
- Battles/wars: European theatre of World War II

Airfield information
- Elevation: 47 metres (154 ft) AMSL
Runways
Direction	Length and surface
04/22	1,326 metres (4,350 ft) Concrete
15/33	1,326 metres (4,350 ft) Concrete

Royal Air Force St Angelo or more simply RAF St Angelo is a former Royal Air Force station during the Second World War, located near the village of Trory on the southern tip of Lower Lough Erne, 2.5 miles (4.0 km) north of Enniskillen, County Fermanagh, Northern Ireland; also used by the Royal Navy’s Fleet Air Arm. The name St Angelo is believed to be taken from the nearby Bishop's house (named after the saint), which was commandeered during the war as the Station Commander's residence; the name also became attached to the airfield.

The airfield was later renamed as St Angelo Barracks from the 1970s and utilised as an accommodation barracks and a centre of helicopter operations over the province, by the British Army and Ulster Defence Regiment during The Troubles in Northern Ireland.

The airfield remains in existence under civilian ownership, reduced to a single runway, with a range of private flying ventures but with no commercial airline services.

== History ==
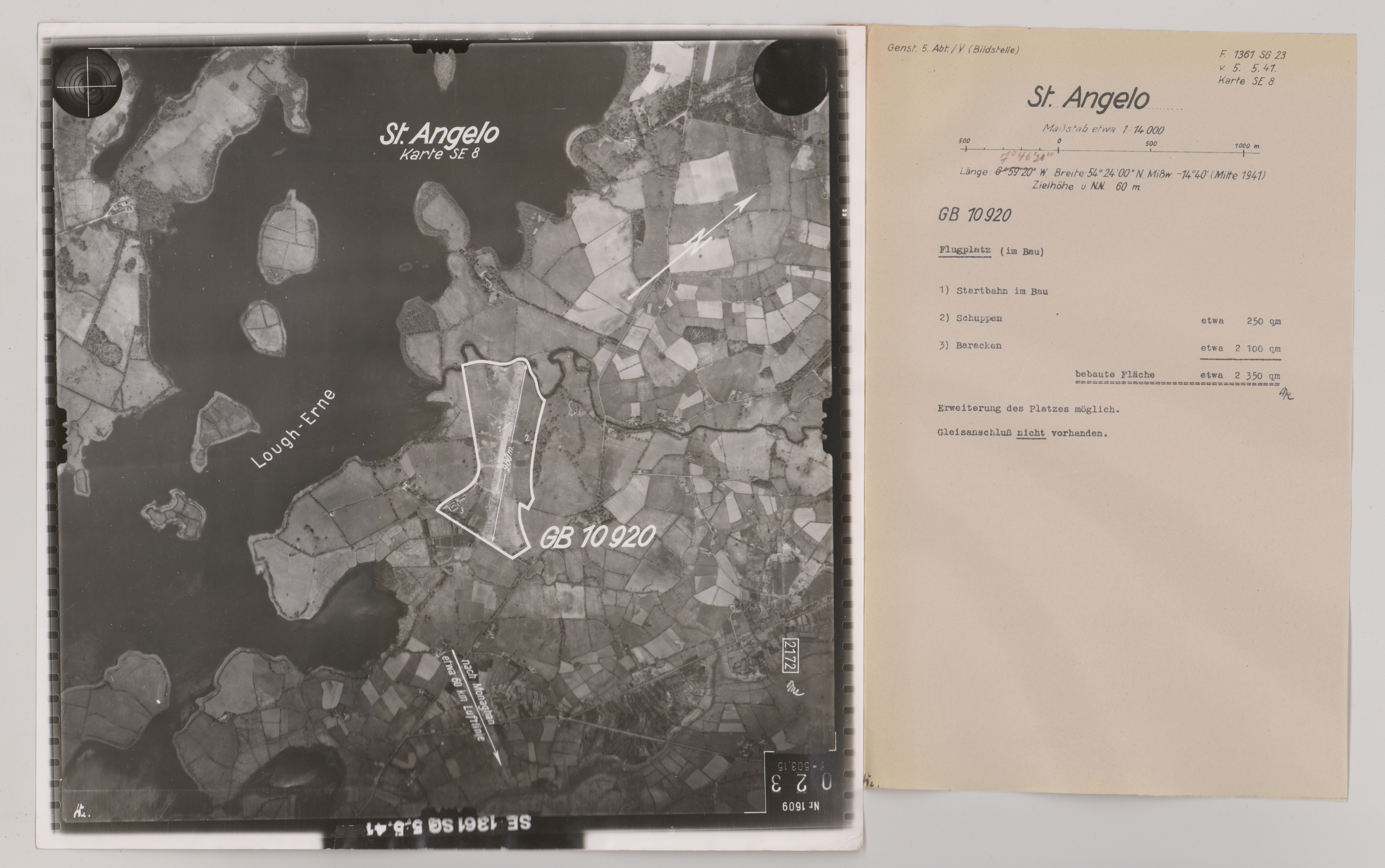
RAF St Angelo on a target dossier of the German Luftwaffe, 1941

=== Second World War ===
Established in April 1941 as a satellite landing ground for RAF Aldergrove, RAF St Angelo opened on 15 September 1941 as a fighter sector station in its own right as home to No. 133 Squadron RAF operating Supermarine Spitfires and No. 134 Squadron RAF flying Hawker Hurricanes to intercept enemy reconnaissance aircraft off the west coast of Ireland and in the air defence role over Belfast.

After a perceived threat of German paratroopers landing on British airfields it is thought that RAF St Angelo was the very first RAF station to have its pill boxes installed with the gunports facing inwards towards the runways.

St Angelo also acted as parent HQ for the satellite No. 131 Operational Training Unit based at RAF Killadeas. The third RAF station on the shores of Loch Erne was RAF Castle Archdale but St Angelo was the only station of the three that additionally had land-based runways.

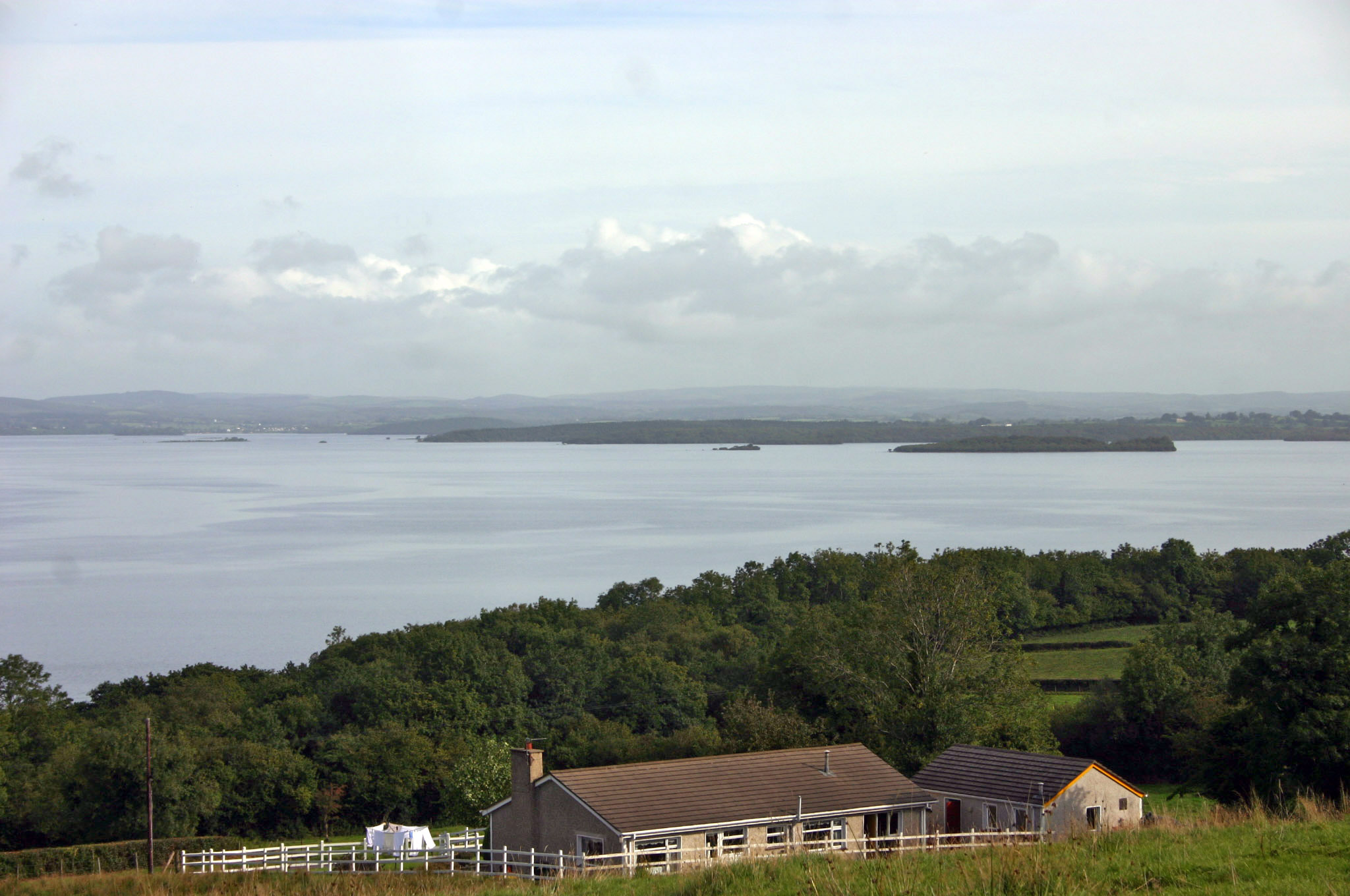
Lough Erne was used by flying boats from RAF St Angelo

In August 1943, the positions were reversed and St Angelo was designated as a subsidiary satellite airfield for No. 17 Group RAF Coastal Command which had established its headquarters at RAF Killadeas and commanded all Lough Erne flying boat squadrons. St Angelo became home to several squadrons of Consolidated Catalina and Short Sunderland flying boats operating from Lough Erne. Later that year, Bristol Beaufighters of No. 235 Squadron RAF were based at St Angelo during anti-submarine patrols in the Irish Sea and over the Atlantic Ocean.

One successful mission from the base is described:

On 10 March 1944 Short Sunderland MKIII, RAF s/n EK591, aircraft "2-U" of No. 422 (General Reconnaissance) Squadron based at St Angelo, County Fermanagh, Ireland with Warrant Officer 2nd Class W.F Morton and crew, sank U-625 at 52-53N 20-19W. This was W/O Morton’s first operational mission as an aircraft commander

A small detachment of half a dozen or so US Naval aviators arrived in July 1943 and remained at St Angelo until the end of the war, on loan as instructors to the RAF pilots converting onto the American built Catalinas. The station also housed naval airmen of the Royal Navy's Fleet Air Arm who were on the nominal roster of HMS Pintail shore establishment and were resident until April 1946.

As the level of operations over Northern Ireland wound down in 1944 No. 12 (Operational) Flying Instructors School RAF was established at both Killadeas and St Angelo on 1 May of that year and remained until February 1945, when it was relocated to RAF Turnberry in Scotland to become the Coastal Command Flying Instructors School RAF.

=== Post war military use ===
Between August 1945 and February 1947 St Angelo was home to No. 272 Maintenance Unit RAF and served as a storage and dismantling depot for mothballed Avro Ansons prior to their eventual sale or disposal. The station later became a centre of helicopter operations over Northern Ireland when St Angelo was transferred to the Army and used as an accommodation barracks by both the British Army and Ulster Defence Regiment during The Troubles in the province, with most personnel housed in temporary portacabins. The St Angelo facility came under mobile mortar fire attacks by the IRA on several occasions in the early 1980s and into the early 90s. On 15 February 1991 the IRA attempted to shoot down one of the St Angelo helicopters that was extracting men from the Duke of Edinburgh's Royal (Berkshire & Wiltshire) Regiment after a border patrol from St Angelo Barracks.

The military occupation of St Angelo, by first the RAF and later the army came to a close in March 1996 when the temporary accommodation buildings were demolished.

== Current use ==
St Angelo is privately owned and designated as an airport, but does not have any commercial airline services. Controversially this almost-complete Second World War airfield was destined to become listed as an historic monument in 2004, as it was considered by many to be the best preserved wartime RAF station in Northern Ireland, but the current landowners preempted the decision within days of the plans being announced, by demolishing most of the perimeter defences and historic wartime buildings.

The airport houses private aviation related businesses including amphibian aviation. The facility is subject to ongoing development and investment.

== Other establishments of the same name ==
RAF St Angelo is not to be confused with HMS St Angelo, the Second World War Fleet Air Arm shore establishment at Ta' Qali on Malta. The Royal Navy took over and renamed RAF Ta' Qali as HMS St Angelo when it operated flying boats after the Siege of Malta.

== See also ==
- List of former Royal Air Force stations
