= Jose Gauche =

Irish artist (1908–2004)

José Gauche
- Born: 1908
- Died: 2004 (aged 95–96)
- Other names: Jose Browne, 10th Marchioness of Sligo
- Known for: creating the "look" of Westport House
- Spouse: Denis Browne, 10th Marquess of Sligo
- Children: Jeremy Browne, 11th Marquess of Sligo

José Gauche became Jose Browne, 10th Marchioness of Sligo (1908–2004) was an Irish artist who was the 10th Marchioness of Sligo and the châtelain and the designer of the interiors of Westport House.

== Life ==
Gauche's early life is not detailed. Her father, William, was a businessman and her ancestors included Huguenots. She was born in June 1908 and she was brought up in London. She comes to notice when she was an artist in London and she married on 12 January 1930. Their first home together was a Suffolk farm.

In 1953 her father-in-law died and she became a Marchioness. Her husband had inherited a 800-acre farm, the huge Westport House and the title of Marquess of Sligo. This was not expected as his elder brother inherited the family fortune and he had four sons. However the four sons died and the Browne family's finances were substantially reduced because of death duties which were paid twice on the fortune. She and her husband and her son moved to Ireland but the farm made no money and by 1958 the option of selling the house only brought derisory offers.

The plan was to open the house to the paying public although this would be the first house on the republic of Ireland to try this as a business plan. First Gauche had to go through each room discarding the detritus gathered over centuries. She and her husband were both artists and the Connauult area was not known for its tourism in the 1950s. She was able to design and make furnishing fabrics to suit the Westport House rooms as she had always made her own clothes and her own accessories. She crocheted bedspreads to decorate the beds and she is credited with being the house's châtelain and its interior designer.

Westport house was opened to the public in 1961 and it had 2,600 visitors. The expansion of the house as a business is credited to her son.

The family moved from Westport House into a house on the estate in 1969 and in 1975 they moved back to Surrey. She became a widow in 1991.

== Death and legacy ==
Gauche died in 2004 when the annual visitor numbers to the house she created was 50,000 per annum. Her heir was her son Jeremy. She had no other children.
