= Enniskillen/St Angelo Airport =

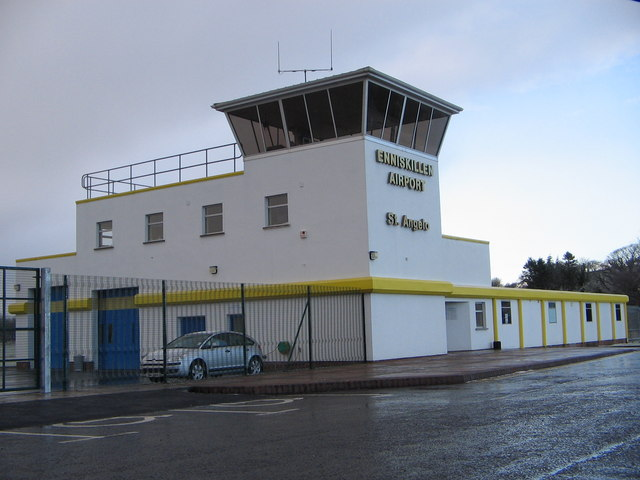
- IATA: ENK; ICAO: EGAB

Summary
- Airport type: Private
- Operator: Enniskillen Airport Ltd
- Serves: Enniskillen
- Location: Trory, County Fermanagh, Northern Ireland
- Elevation AMSL: 155 ft / 47 m
- Coordinates: 54°23′55″N 007°39′07″W
- Website: enniskillen-airport.co.uk

Map
- Location in Northern Ireland EGAB (island of Ireland) EGAB (the United Kingdom)

Runways
Direction	Length		Surface
Direction	m	ft	Surface
15/33	1,326	4,350	Asphalt
- Sources: UK AIP at NATS

Enniskillen/St Angelo Aerodrome (IATA: ENK, ICAO: EGAB) is located 3 nautical miles (5.6 km; 3.5 mi) north of Enniskillen, County Fermanagh, Northern Ireland. The aerodrome has a CAA Ordinary Licence (Number P875) that allows flights for the public transport of passengers or for flying instruction as authorised by the licensee (Enniskillen Airport Limited). First built and used during World War II as RAF St Angelo and later renamed St Angelo Barracks while in use as a British Army base, the airfield has been in private ownership as a civilian facility since 1996. The original two runways were reduced to one following the development of the main Enniskillen to Kesh road.

== History ==
=== Royal Air Force station ===
The airfield was originally established in April 1941 as a relief landing ground (RLG) for RAF Aldergrove. Later that year on 15 September RAF St Angelo opened as a fighter sector station in its own right, operating Spitfires and Hurricanes to intercept enemy reconnaissance aircraft off the west coast of Ireland and in the air defence role over Belfast.

In 1943 the station also became home to several squadrons of Catalina and Sunderland flying boats operating from Lough Erne. Later that year, Bristol Beaufighters were based at St Angelo during anti-submarine patrols in the Irish Sea and over the Atlantic Ocean. As the level of operations over Northern Ireland wound down in 1944 No. 12 (Operational) Flying Instructor School was established at both Killadeas and St Angelo and remained until February 1945, when the school was relocated to RAF Turnberry in Scotland.

Between the end of the war and February 1947 St Angelo was home to No. 272 Maintenance Unit RAF and served as a storage and dismantling depot for mothballed Avro Ansons prior to their eventual sale or disposal.

=== Use by the army ===
The station later became a centre of helicopter operations over Northern Ireland when St Angelo was transferred to the Army and used as an accommodation barracks for the Ulster Defence Regiment and other British Army regiments during The Troubles in the province, with most personnel housed in a vast array of temporary portacabins.

The military use of St Angelo came to a close in March 1996 when the temporary accommodation buildings were demolished, since when St Angelo airfield has been in use as a civilian facility.

== Operations ==
Scheduled passenger flights have, in the past, operated from this airport, but these ceased in 2006. There are a number of companies based at the airfield offering a range of flying- and aircraft-related services. A helicopter training and hire company, Unique Helicopters, offers pleasure flights from the airfield, while there are also two helicopter maintenance facilities. Enniskillen also has been a host venue for Heli Challenge: The Premier Helicopter Championship, an international competition to test the skill of helicopter pilots from across the British Isles. It hosted the event in 2009 & 2011.
