= Jeremy Browne, 11th Marquess of Sligo =

Anglo-Irish hereditary peer (1939–2014)

The Most Honourable The Marquess of Sligo
- Born: Jeremy Ulick Browne; 4 June 1939
- Died: 13 July 2014 (aged 75)
- Education: St. Columba's College, Dublin
- Alma mater: Royal Agricultural University
- Successor: Sebastian Ulick Browne, 12th Marquess of Sligo
- Spouse: Jennifer Cooper (m. 1961)
- Children: 5
- Parent: Denis Browne, 10th Marquess of Sligo

Jeremy Ulick Browne, 11th Marquess of Sligo (4 June 1939 – 13 July 2014), styled Earl of Altamont until 1991, was an Irish hereditary peer and businessman. On the death of his father, he was entitled to sit in the House of Lords by virtue of the subsidiary title Baron Mounteagle, in the Peerage of the United Kingdom. He never took his seat and lost the right with the passage of the House of Lords Act 1999.

== Biography ==
Altamont was the eldest son of Jose Gauche and Denis Browne, 10th Marquess of Sligo born in 1939. He was educated at Ludgrove School, St. Columba's College, Dublin, and briefly the Royal Agricultural College, which he left after only two terms. He returned to Ireland and help run the family estate, Westport House.

In May 2014 his book, A Life at Westport House: 50 Years A-Going, was released.

He was married on 26 October 1961 to Jennifer June Lushington Cooper, daughter of Derek Cooper. Lady Sligo is the stepdaughter of the former Viscountess Ruthven of Canberra, and her father became in 1952 the stepfather of two young stepsons, now the late Earl of Gowrie and his brother the journalist and Islamic scholar Malise Ruthven. The Marquess and Marchioness had five daughters. After his death, his daughters inherited the family estate of Westport while his cousin Sebastian Browne succeeded him as Marquess.

Lord Sligo introduced a private members' Bill in Dáil Éireann in 1990 to allow the dissolution of a family trust which would prevent his five daughters from inheriting Westport House due to their female gender.

== Arms ==
Coat of arms of Jeremy Browne, 11th Marquess of Sligo
Crest An eagle, displayed, vert. Escutcheon Sable, three lions, passant, in bend, argent, between four bendlets, of the last. Supporters Dexter, a talbot, proper, gorged with a baron’s coronet; Sinister, a horse, argent Motto Suivez raison (Follow reason).

Peerage of Ireland
Preceded by Denis Browne	Marquess of Sligo; 1991–2014	Succeeded by Sebastian Browne
