= Ulick de Burgh Browne, 7th Marquess of Sligo =

British and Irish peer and British army officer (1898–1941)

The Most Honourable The Marquess of Sligo MC
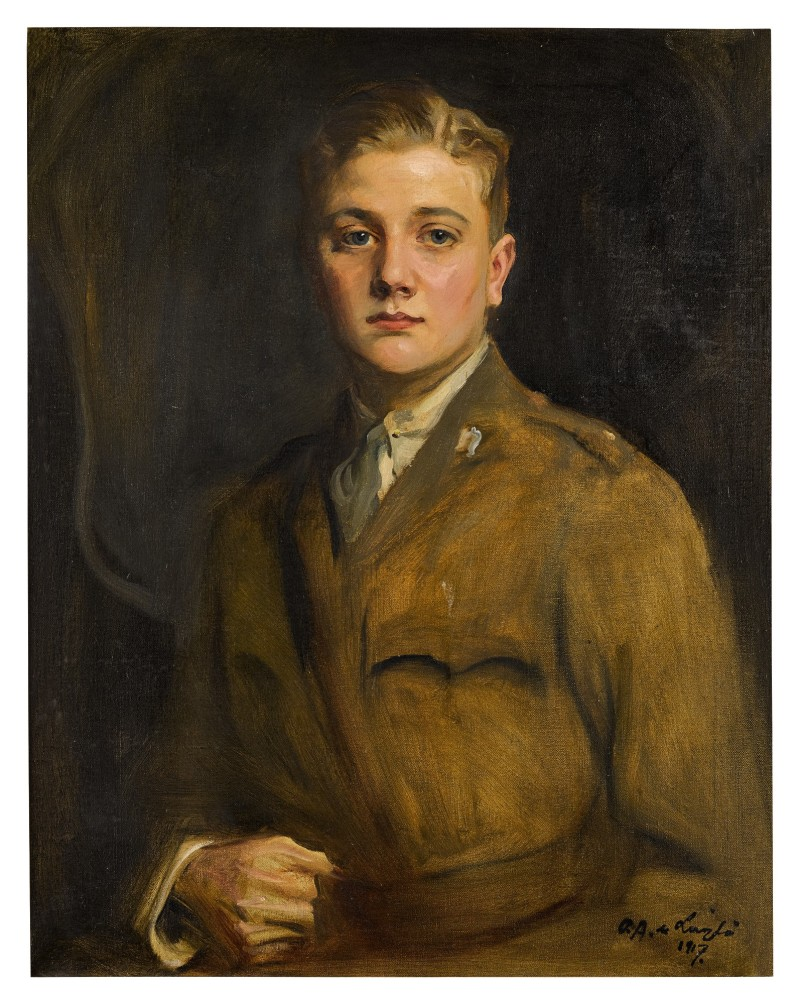
- Portrait of Ulick de Burgh Browne, 7th Marquess of Sligo (1898–1941)
- Born: 30 March 1898
- Died: 7 January 1941 (aged 42)
- Parents: George Browne, 6th Marquess of Sligo (father); Agatha Stewart Hodgson (mother)

Ulick de Burgh Browne, 7th Marquess of Sligo (30 March 1898 – 7 January 1941) styled Earl of Altamont until his father's death in 1935, was a British and Irish peer and British army officer. He served in the cavalry regiment the Royal Scots Greys during World War I.

He was the son of George Browne, 6th Marquess of Sligo and Agatha Stewart Hodgson.

He died childless at the age of 42 of stomach cancer in Elpis Hospital Dublin, and was succeeded by his uncle, Arthur Howe Browne. He left an estate valued at £300,845.

== Arms ==
Coat of arms of Ulick de Burgh Browne, 7th Marquess of Sligo
| Crest An eagle, displayed, vert. Escutcheon Sable, three lions, passant, in bend, argent, between four bendlets, of the last. Supporters Dexter, a talbot, proper, gorged with a baron’s coronet ; Sinister, a horse, argent Motto Suivez raison (Follow reason). |

Peerage of Ireland
| Preceded by George Ulick Browne | Marquess of Sligo; 1935–1941 | Succeeded by Arthur Howe Browne |
