= Barry Kirwan =

- Born: 14 February 1986 (age 39); Omagh, County Tyrone, Northern Ireland
- Genres: Country, Country and Irish
- Occupations: Singer, songwriter, drummer, guitarist
- Years active: 2009–present
- Labels: Sharpe Music
- Website: barrykirwanmusic.com

Barry Kirwan (born 14 February 1986 in Omagh, County Tyrone, Northern Ireland) is a Northern Irish country singer and drummer. He released his debut album New Beginnings with "Keep It in the Middle of the Road" as his debut single, followed by "Up the Jive". He is nominated as "Newcomer of the Year" for the 2016 RTÉ Irish Country Music Awards.

== Beginnings ==
Kirwan comes from a very musical family being the long-standing Irish country singers Dominic Kirwan, Barry's father and the singer Colm Kirwan and singer-songwriter Jonathan Kirwan are his brothers. Very early on, he was a member of his school's choir and took part in school productions or singing competitions. At age of 5, he joined the Seamus Kerrigan School of Traditional Irish Dance where he stayed until the age of 18, at the same time taking part in a range of competitions, such as the All Ireland Dancing championships and Scór. He was also into acting particularly as a member of the Hazel Wand Drama School in his hometown of Omagh. At age 11, Barry started playing the drums, his passion. He studied in London at Drumtech college, part of the British and Irish Modern Music Institute (BIMM) schools.

== Career ==
Shortly after college, Kirwan joined his father's band as a drummer and backing vocalist for 4 years. In September 2010 he joined his brother Colm Kirwan in Nashville and played drums for some shows by American country duo Joey & Rory. Returning home in 2011, he worked with Irish country singer Lisa McHugh before joining rising Country and Irish star Derek Ryan as drummer and backing vocalist until 2015 touring with him for 4 years all around Ireland, the U.K. and Australia.

In February 2016, he left the Derek Ryan band to pursue his own solo career. He again toured with his father Dominic Kirwan in the "Here For a Good Time Tour" throughout the UK and Ireland promoting his career. On 6 May 2016, he released his first solo single "Keep It in the Middle of the Road", his debut single from his solo debut album New Beginnings on Sharpe Music released on 10 June 2016. He also formed his own Barry Kirwan Band on the occasion. His follow-up single is "Up the Jive" co-written by Barry with his brother Colm and released on 21 June 2016. Both singles are accompanied by music videos.

== Personal life ==
Barry is the son of the long-standing Irish singer Dominic Kirwan. Barry has three brothers and a sister all involved in music and the arts. His Nashville based brother Colm has recorded his debut album. His brother Jonathan is a Glasgow-based singer-songwriter.

== Discography ==
=== Albums ===
Year
Album
Peak positions
Notes
IRE
Albums

IRE
Indie
Albums
UK
Albums

2016
New Beginnings

No.	Title	Length
1.	"It Starts With "L""	2:30
2.	"Keep It In the Middle of the Road"	2:49
3.	"Husband and Wife"	3:57
4.	"Sweet, Sweet Smile"	2:43
5.	"Somedays You Gotta Dance"	2:18
6.	"Whenever You Come Around"	4:18
7.	"The Story of My Life"	2:26
8.	"Up the Jive"	2:53
9.	"Forever Like That"	3:19
10.	"It Takes All Kinds" (feat. Dominic Kirwan)	2:26
11.	"Underneath the Oak Tree"	2:49
12.	"Night Changes"	4:01
13.	"You've Got Me Thinking That Way"	3:18
14.	"Mary Mac"	2:50
15.	"Go Rest High on That Mountain" (Bonus track)	3:49

=== EPs ===
Year
Album
Peak positions
Notes
IRE
Albums

IRE
Indie
Albums
2016
It Takes All Kinds
(jointly with Dominic Kirwan)

No.	Title	Length
1.	"The Whiskey Ain't Workin' Anymore" (with Dominic Kirwan)	2:41
2.	"Guitar's and Cadillacs" (with Dominic Kirwan)	2:32
3.	"Talking to the Wrong Man" (with Dominic Kirwan)	3:17
4.	"It Takes All Kinds" (with Dominic Kirwan)	2:23

=== Singles ===
Year	Single	Peak positions	Album
Year	Single	IRE	Album
2016	"Keep It in the Middle of the Road"	–	New Beginnings
2016	"Up the Jive"	–	New Beginnings
2017	"Husband and Wife"	–	New Beginnings
