= Henry Browne, 5th Marquess of Sligo =

Irish peer (1831–1913)

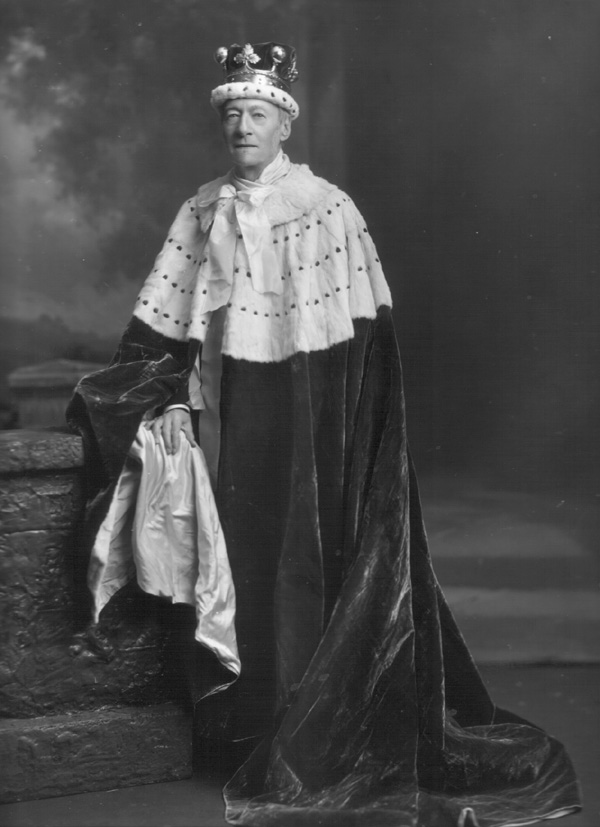
Lord Sligo wearing coronation robes and coronet of a marquess, 1911

Henry Ulick Browne, 5th Marquess of Sligo (14 March 1831 – 24 February 1913), styled Lord Henry Browne until 1903, was an Irish peer.

Browne was the fourth son of Howe Browne, 2nd Marquess of Sligo, and Lady Hester Catherine de Burgh, daughter of John de Burgh, 13th Earl of Clanricarde. He succeeded to the marquessate in December 1903, aged 72, on the death of his unmarried elder brother. He married Catherine Henrietta Dicken, daughter of William Stephens Dicken, on 25 October 1855. They had ten children:

- George Browne, 6th Marquess of Sligo (1856–1935)
- Catherine Elizabeth Browne (1857–1874)
- Herbert Richard Browne (1858 – killed in action 9 September 1890)
- Lady Edith Hester Browne (1860–1936)
- Lady Florence Marion Browne (1863–1946)
- Arthur Browne, 8th Marquess of Sligo (1867–1951)
- Terence Browne, 9th Marquess of Sligo (1873–1952)
- Lady Nora Browne (1873–1948)
- Alice Evelyn Browne (1877–1970)
- Lieutenant-Colonel Lord Alfred Eden Browne, DSO, Royal Field Artillery, (1878 – killed in action 27 August 1918)

The 5th Marquess is buried to the north-east of the main chapel at Kensal Green Cemetery in London.

== Arms ==
Coat of arms of Henry Browne, 5th Marquess of Sligo
Crest An eagle, displayed, vert. Escutcheon Sable, three lions, passant, in bend, argent, between four bendlets, of the last. Supporters Dexter, a talbot, proper, gorged with a baron’s coronet ; Sinister, a horse, argent Motto Suivez raison (Follow reason).

Peerage of Ireland
Preceded by John Thomas Browne	Marquess of Sligo; 1903–1913	Succeeded by George Ulick Browne
