= Terence Browne, 9th Marquess of Sligo =

Irish Marquess (1873–1952)

The Most Honourable The Marquess of Sligo
- Born: Terence Morris Browne; 28 September 1873
- Died: 28 July 1952 (aged 78)
- Parent(s): Henry Ulick Browne, 5th Marquess of Sligo; Catherine Henrietta Dickon
- Relatives: Denis Browne (nephew)

Terence Morris Browne, 9th Marquess of Sligo (28 September 1873 – 28 July 1952), styled Terence Morris Browne until 1951, was an Irish peer who succeeded to the title upon the death of his older brother, Arthur Browne, 8th Marquess of Sligo.

Browne was a younger son of Henry Ulick Browne, 5th Marquess of Sligo and Catherine Henrietta Dickon. He died unmarried and was succeeded by his nephew, Denis Browne, 10th Marquess of Sligo.

== Arms ==
Coat of arms of Terence Browne, 9th Marquess of Sligo
Crest An eagle, displayed, vert. Escutcheon Sable, three lions, passant, in bend, argent, between four bendlets, of the last. Supporters Dexter, a talbot, proper, gorged with a baron’s coronet; Sinister, a horse, argent Motto Suivez raison (Follow reason).

Peerage of Ireland
Preceded by Arthur Browne	Marquess of Sligo; 1951–1952	Succeeded by Denis Browne
