= Arthur Browne, 8th Marquess of Sligo =

Irish peer (1867–1951)

The Most Honourable Colonel The Marquess of Sligo KBE, CB
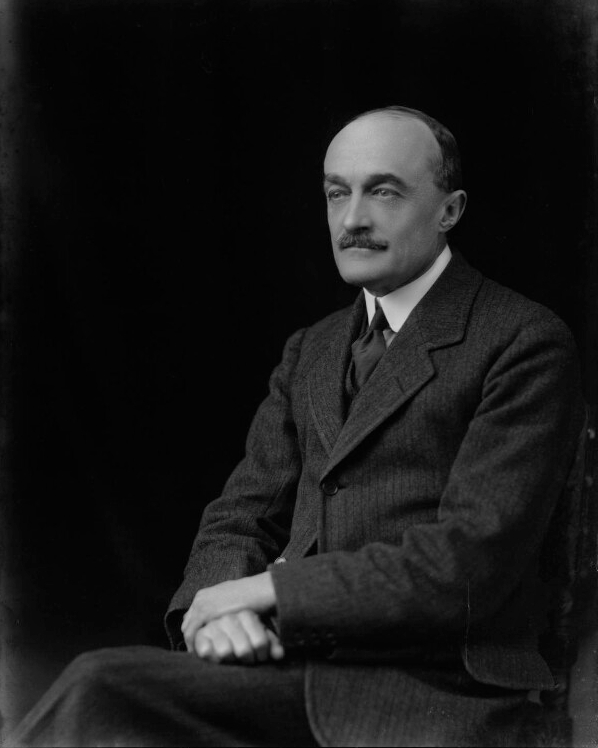
- A c. 1920 photograph of Browne
- Born: Arthur Howe Browne; 8 May 1867
- Died: 28 May 1951 (aged 84)
- Spouse: Lillian Whiteside Chapman
- Military career
- Allegiance: United Kingdom of Great Britain and Ireland
- Branch: British Army
- Rank: Colonel
- Units: Royal Munster Fusiliers; Directorate of Intelligence
- Conflicts: Second Boer War; Tirah campaign; World War I

Colonel Arthur Howe Browne, 8th Marquess of Sligo, KBE, CB (8 May 1867 – 28 May 1951), styled Arthur Howe Browne until 1903 and Lord Arthur Browne between 1903 and 1941, was an Irish soldier and peer.

== Life and career ==
Browne was the third son of Henry Browne, 5th Marquess of Sligo, and Catherine Henrietta Dicken, daughter of William Stephens Dicken. He was educated at Windlesham House School from 1877 to 1880 and thereafter at Clifton College.

In 1903 his father succeeded an elder brother as Marquess, and he received the courtesy style, Lord Arthur Browne. Late in his life in 1941, he himself succeeded to the marquessate on the early death of his nephew.

After a period as a lieutenant in the militia, Browne came first in the competitive examinations for the Regular Army and was commissioned second lieutenant on 8 June 1889 in the Royal Munster Fusiliers. He was promoted to lieutenant on 30 December 1891 and served as a transport officer in the Tirah Campaign 1897–1898, following which he was promoted to captain on 27 August 1898. He served with the 1st Battalion of his regiment in South Africa during the Second Boer War. At the end of the war in 1902, he went with the battalion to India. More than 520 officers and men left Cape Town on the SS Lake Manitoba in September 1902, arriving at Bombay the following month. He was then stationed at Multan in Punjab. He received his majority in 1907 and served in the Great War as a colonel on the staff of the Directorate of Intelligence at the War Office.

From 1919 to 1930, Browne was the Principal Assistant Secretary of the Imperial War Graves Commission. In 1923, he wrote:

"In perhaps two or three hundred years' time, when the native population had reached a higher stage of civilisation, they might then be glad to see that headstones had been erected on the native graves and that the native soldiers had received precisely the same treatment as their white comrades."

A 2021 report commented that his response showed "what he may have considered foresight, but one that was explicitly framed by contemporary racial prejudice". The report continues in the light of the lack of memorials and gravestones for non-white soldiers: "Underpinning all these decisions, however, were the entrenched prejudices, preconceptions and pervasive racism of contemporary imperial attitudes".

== Family ==
Lord Sligo married Lillian Whiteside Chapman, daughter of Charles Chapman, on 18 November 1910. He died in May 1951, aged 84, and was succeeded by his younger brother, Lord Terence Browne.

Lord Sligo's funeral was described by his nephew, the 10th Marquess:

"..on election day ... his coffin, draped in a Union Jack, was carried though the gates into Westport town. The chief undertaker, a respected local builder, had been a general in the Old IRA. No one thought the flag sinister or a joke in poor taste. Indeed it was hardly remarked upon. The Eighth Marquess believed in God, the British Empire and Westport in that order ... and for him there was nothing incongruous about the trio."

== Arms ==
Coat of arms of Arthur Browne, 8th Marquess of Sligo
Crest An eagle, displayed, vert. Escutcheon Sable, three lions, passant, in bend, argent, between four bendlets, of the last. Supporters Dexter, a talbot, proper, gorged with a baron’s coronet; Sinister, a horse, argent Motto Suivez raison (Follow reason). Orders The Most Excellent Order of the British Empire - Knight Commander (KBE)

Peerage of Ireland
Preceded by Ulick de Burgh Browne	Marquess of Sligo; 1941–1951	Succeeded by Terence Morris Browne
