= Laragh (Trory) =

Coordinates: 54.4049°N 7.6449°W

Laragh: Irish: Lathrach
- Location within Northern Ireland
- District: Fermanagh
- County: County Fermanagh
- Country: Northern Ireland
- Sovereign state: United Kingdom
- Post town: ENNISKILLEN
- Postcode district: BT94
- Dialling code: 028
- UK Parliament: Fermanagh and South Tyrone
- NI Assembly: Fermanagh and South Tyrone

Laragh (from Irish Lathrach, meaning 'the site of some sort of building') is a small townland of 132 acres (0.2 sq mi) in County Fermanagh, Northern Ireland. It is situated in the civil parish of Trory and the historic barony of Tirkennedy. It is near Enniskillen Airport.

Laragh is the base for Balcas Timber Ltd, a producer of timber products and wood pellets as a renewable energy fuel and for export.

There are two other townlands in County Fermanagh with the same name: Laragh (Rossory) and Laragh (Kinawley).
