= George Browne, 6th Marquess of Sligo =

Irish peer and captain (1856–1935)

George Browne
- Marquess of Sligo
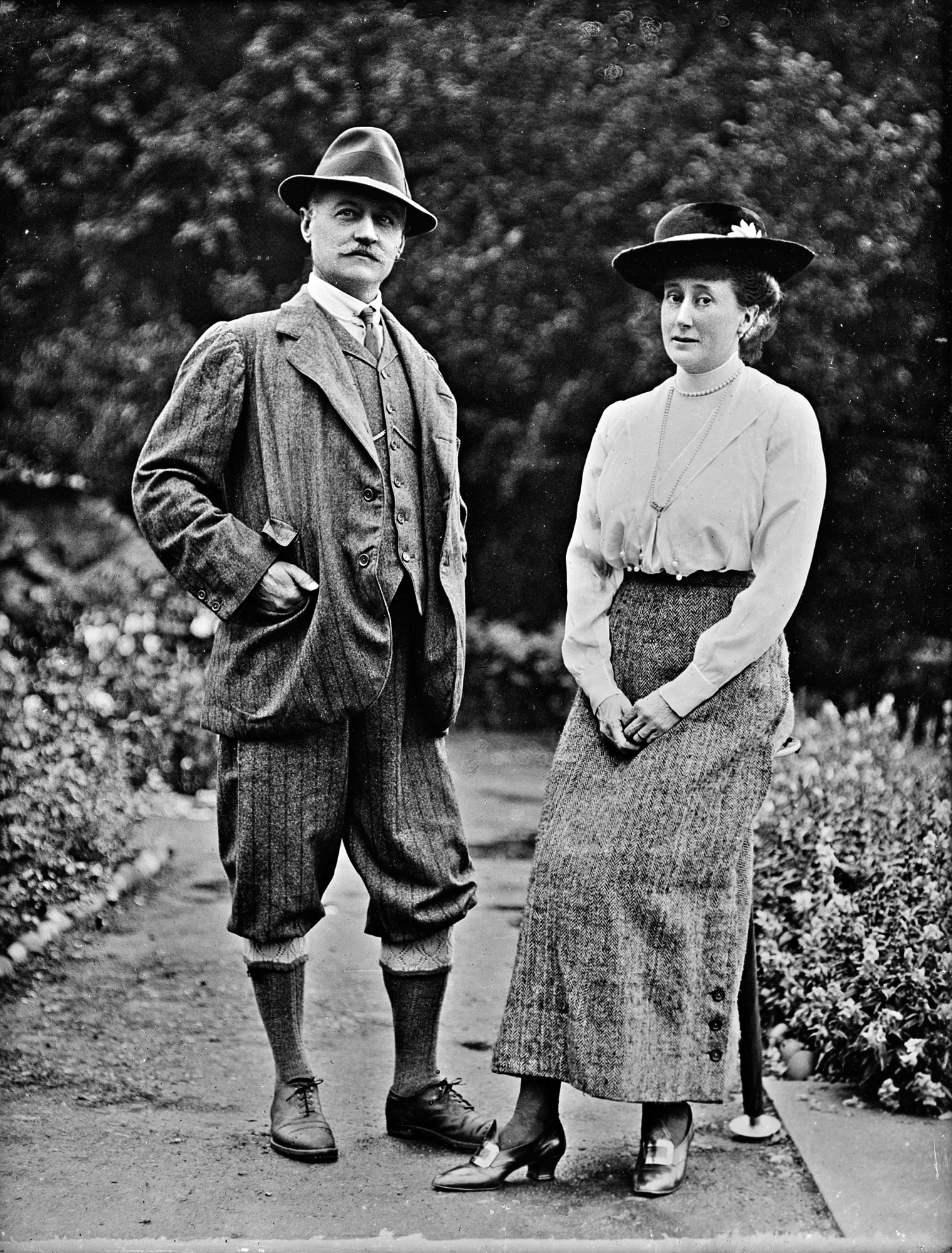
- George Ulick Browne and his wife, Agatha Stewart Hodgson, c. 1910s
- Predecessor: Henry Browne, 5th Marquess of Sligo
- Successor: Ulick de Burgh Browne, 7th Marquess of Sligo
- Born: George Ulick Browne; 1 September 1856; Munger, British India
- Died: 26 February 1935 (aged 78); London, England
- Spouse: Agatha Stewart Hodgson

George Ulick Browne, 6th Marquess of Sligo and 4th Earl of Clanricarde (1 September 1856 – 26 February 1935), styled Earl of Altamont until 1913, was an Irish peer.

== Biography ==
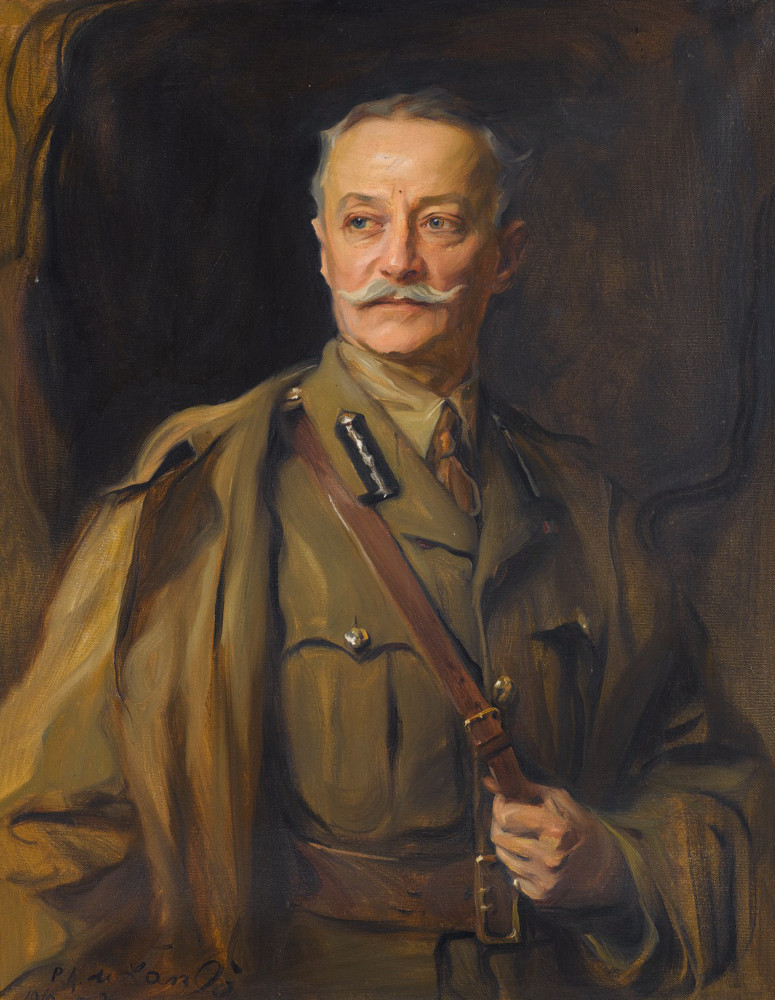
Portrait by Philip de László, 1916

Born 1 September 1856, Browne was the eldest son of Henry Browne, 5th Marquess of Sligo, and his wife Catherine Henrietta Dicken. He was born in Munger, British India, and was known by the courtesy title of Earl of Altamont in his youth. He married Agatha Stewart Hodgson, daughter of James Stewart Hodgson, on 12 October 1887. They had three daughters and one son:

- Eileen Agatha Browne (1889–1940) — married James Stanhope, 7th Earl Stanhope
- Moya Melisende Browne (1892–1974) — married Lieut. Allan Campbell (Coldstream Guards), who died at the First Battle of the Aisne
- Doreen Geraldine Browne (1896–1979) — married Michael Knatchbull, 5th Baron Brabourne
- Ulick de Burgh Browne, 7th Marquess of Sligo (1898–1941)

He succeeded to the marquessate in February 1913, aged 56, on the death of his father. Upon the 1916 death of Hubert de Burgh-Canning, 2nd Marquess of Clanricarde, the Marquess of Sligo also became Earl of Clanricarde. In 1921 he attended the first meeting of the short-lived Senate of Southern Ireland. In 1922 he was photographed by Walter Stoneman.

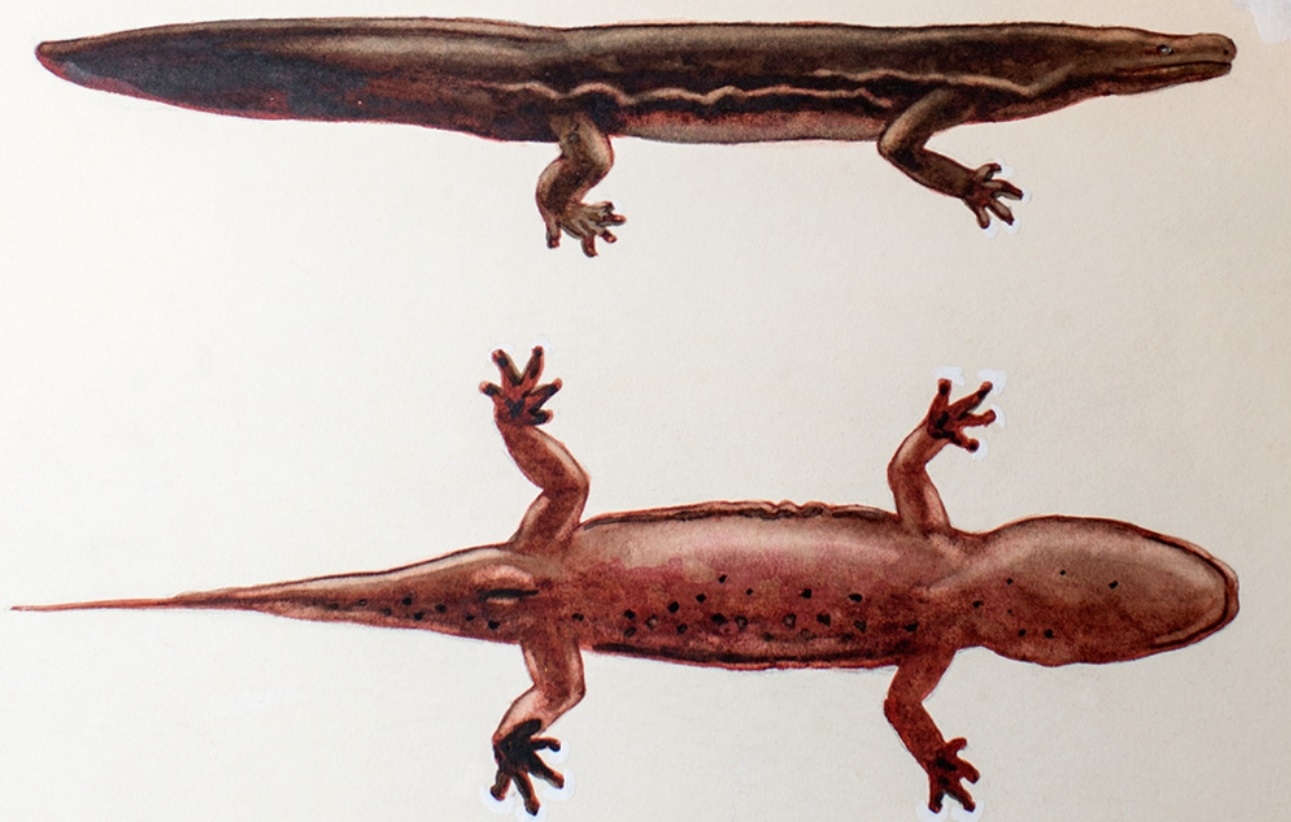
Andrias sligoi

In 1924, when visiting British Hong Kong, the Marquess of Sligo succeeded in getting a specimen of the South China giant salamander sent to London Zoo. The species was named Megalobatrachus sligoi in his honour; it is today called Andrias sligoi. He died on 26 February 1935 in London.

== Arms ==
Coat of arms of George Browne, 6th Marquess of Sligo
Crest An eagle displayed vert. Escutcheon Sable three lions passant in bend argent between four bendlets of the last. Supporters Dexter a talbot proper, gorged with a baron’s coronet; Sinister, a horse argent Motto Suivez raison (Follow reason/the right).

Peerage of Ireland
Preceded by Henry Browne	Marquess of Sligo; 1913–1935	Succeeded by Ulick de Burgh Browne
Preceded by Hubert de Burgh-Canning	Earl of Clanricarde; 1916–1935	Succeeded by Ulick de Burgh Browne
