= Trory =

Village in County Fermanagh, Northern Ireland

Coordinates: 54.3923°N 7.6438°W

Trory: Irish: Treabhraigh
- Location within Northern Ireland
- Population: 90 (2001 Census)
- District: Fermanagh and Omagh
- County: County Fermanagh
- Country: Northern Ireland
- Sovereign state: United Kingdom
- Postcode district: BT
- Dialling code: 028
- UK Parliament: Fermanagh and South Tyrone
- NI Assembly: Fermanagh and South Tyrone

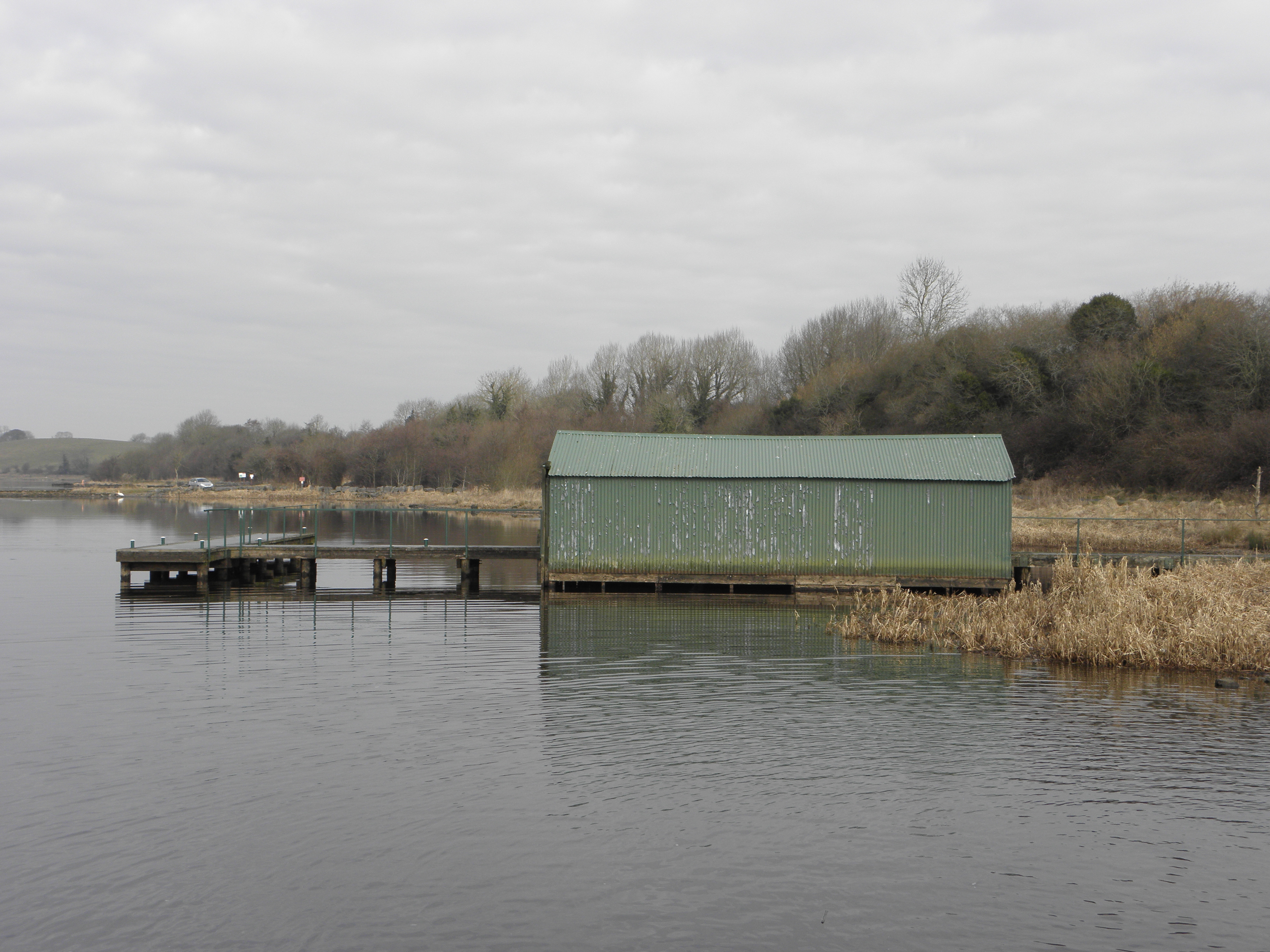
Boathouse at Trory in 2010

Trory (from Irish Treabhraigh, meaning 'place of tillage') is the name of a townland (of 335 acres), of a small village and of a civil parish in County Fermanagh, Northern Ireland, 3 miles (5 km) north of Enniskillen. The townland is situated in the historic barony of Tirkennedy, and the civil parish covers areas of the barony of Tirkennedy, as well as the barony of Lurg. In the 2001 Census it had (with Ballycassidy and Laragh) a population of 315 people. It lies within the Fermanagh and Omagh District Council area.

St Michael's Church of Ireland Parish Church in Trory is a listed building.

== Transport ==
The ferry to Devenish Island leaves from Trory point about 1.5 miles out of Enniskillen.

== Civil parish of Trory ==
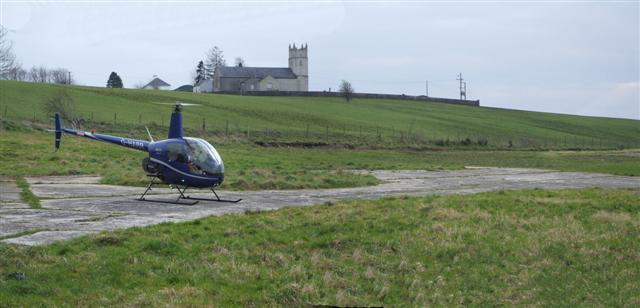
St Michael's Church

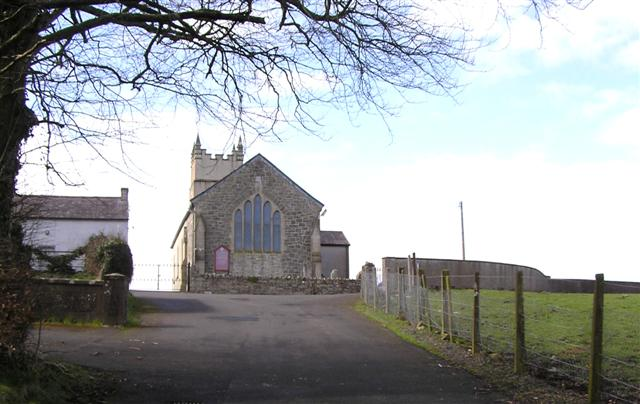
St Michaels church

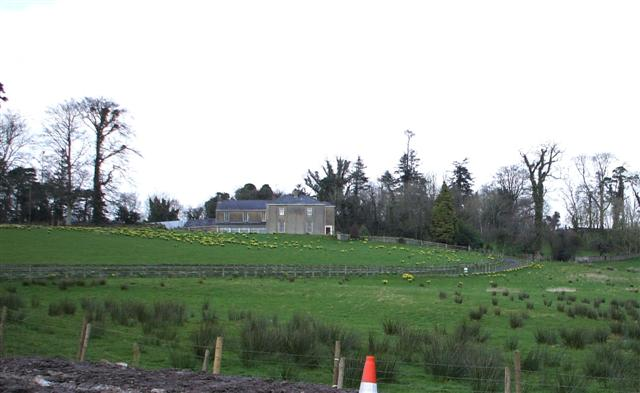
Trory Glebe House

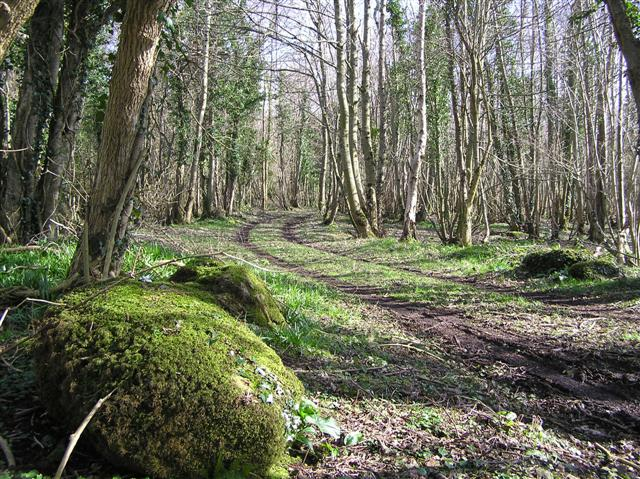
Causeway at Inish Decarne

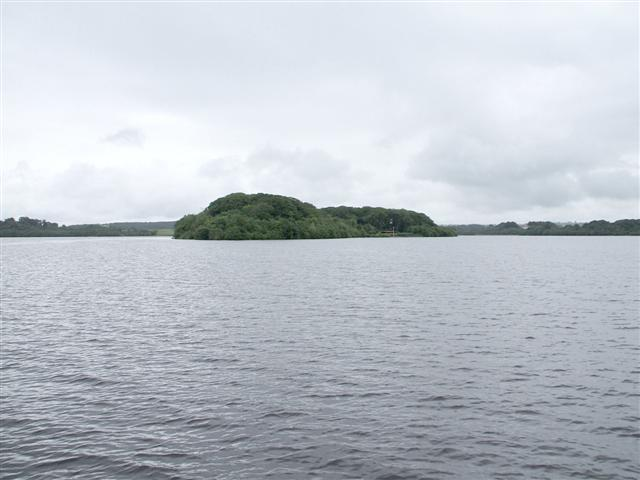
Long Island Lough Erne

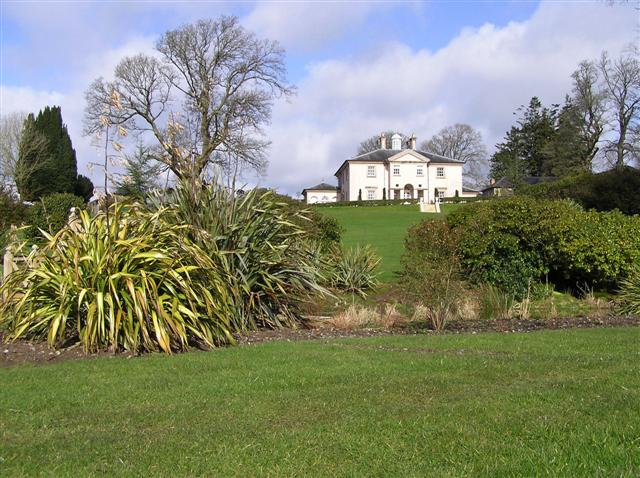
House at Lough Erne

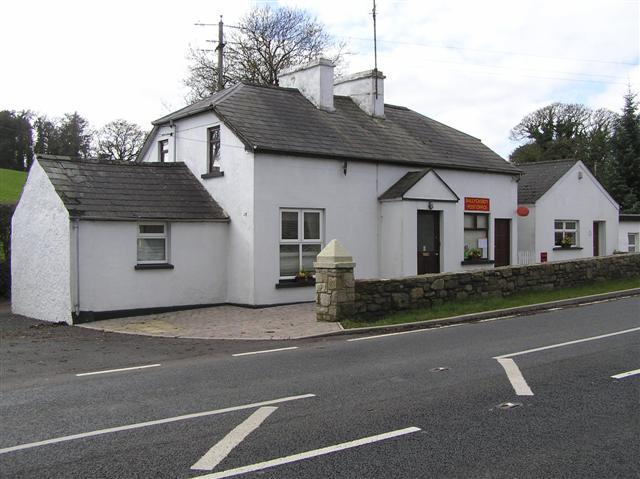
Ballycassidy Post Office

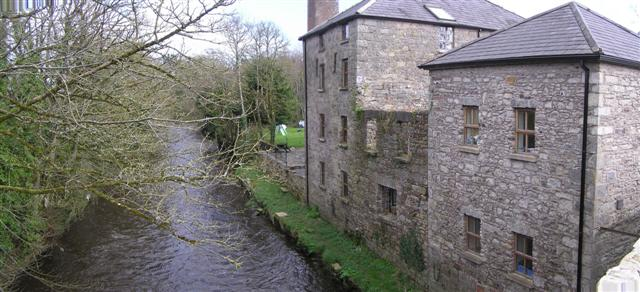
Cloughbally Mill, Ballycassidy

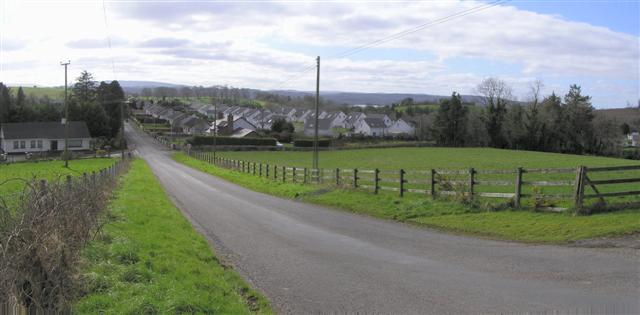
Drumcullion

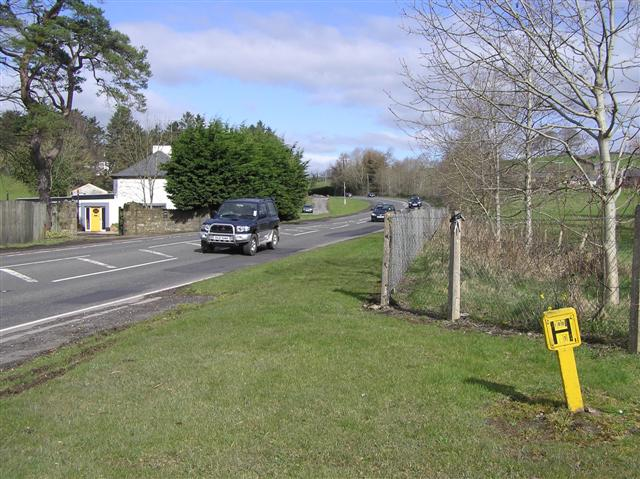
Derryargon

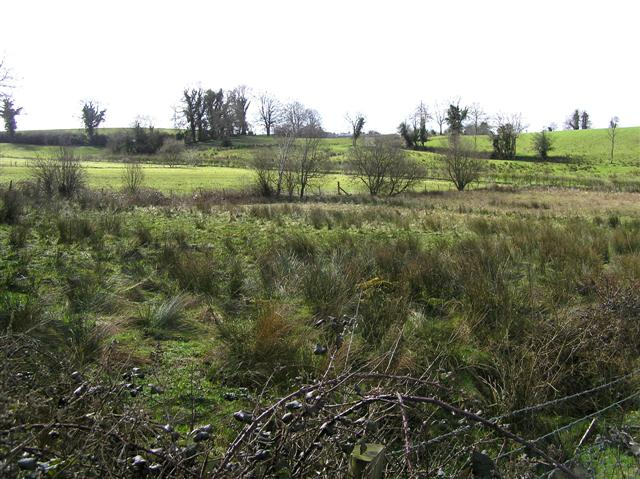
Derryargon

The civil parish includes the small village of Ballycassidy.

=== Townlands ===
The civil parish includes the following townlands:

=== B ===
Ballycassidy, Buninubber

=== C ===
Car Island, Cloghbally, Concrick

=== D ===
Derryargon, Derrygore, Derryinch, Drumcoo, Drumgarrow, Drummackilowney

=== F ===
Ferny Island

=== G ===
Gublusk

=== H ===
Hay Island

=== I ===
Inish Free

=== K ===
Kilmacormick

=== L ===
Laragh, Long Island

=== M ===
Mossfield (also known as Urbal)

=== O ===
Oghill

=== P ===
Paris Island Big, Paris Island Little

=== R ===
Ring, Rockfield, Rossahilly

=== S ===
Shanmullagh, Srahenny

=== T ===
Thornhill Glebe, Trasna Island, Trory, Tully, Tullyavy, Tullylone

=== U ===
Urbal (also known as Mossfield)

=== W ===
White Island

== See also ==
- List of townlands in County Fermanagh
- List of towns and villages in Northern Ireland
- List of civil parishes of County Fermanagh
