= Westport House =

Georgian house in County Mayo, Ireland

- Teach Chathair na Mart
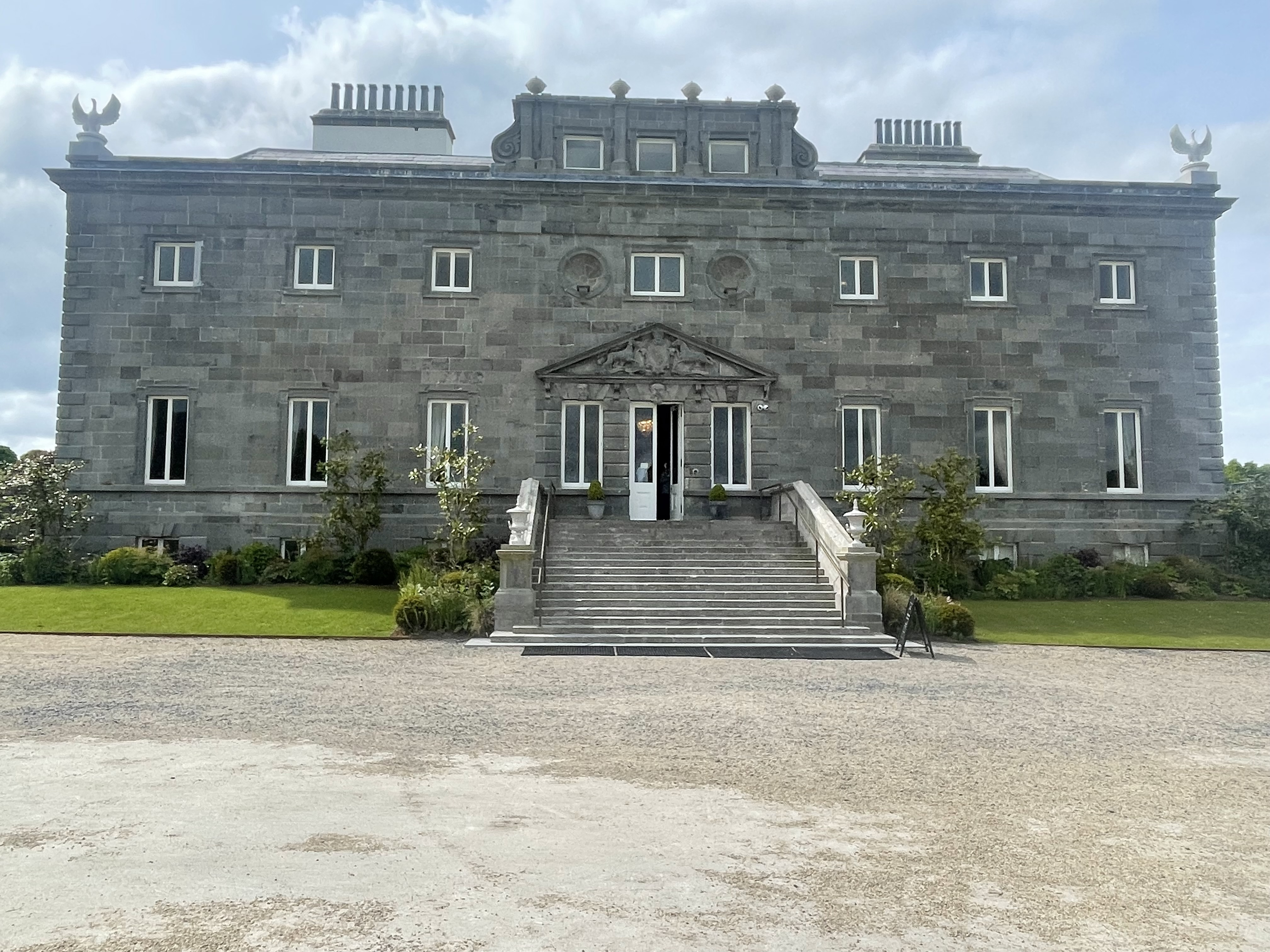
- Westport House East Front in 2023

- Location within Ireland

General information
- Status: Private dwelling house / campsite
- Type: House
- Architectural style: Palladian; Georgian
- Location: Westport, County Mayo, Ireland
- Coordinates: 53.800785°N 9.5363634°W
- Estimated completion: 1731
- Owner: Hughes family

Technical details
- Material: limestone
- Floor count: 3 over basement

Design and construction
- Architects: Richard Cassels (1731); Thomas Ivory (1773–78); James Wyatt (1781) - dining room, (1796) - greenhouse; Henry Holland (1808) - gatweway at North East end of town; Benjamin Dean Wyatt (1819) - south wing containing library; George Wilkinson (1858) - Sicilian marble staircase
- Developer: John Browne, 1st Earl of Altamont

Website
- www.westporthouse.ie

Westport House in Westport, County Mayo, Ireland, is a Georgian country house, historically the family seat of the Marquess of Sligo and the Brownes. The house was designed by the architect Richard Cassels with later additions by Thomas Ivory and James Wyatt.

The title and the house were separated in 2014, following the death of Jeremy Browne, 11th Marquess of Sligo, who left the estate to his five daughters. His titles passed to his first cousin, Sebastian Ulick Browne, a residential estate agent in Australia.

In 2017, the house was purchased by the Hughes family, owners of Portwest.

== History ==
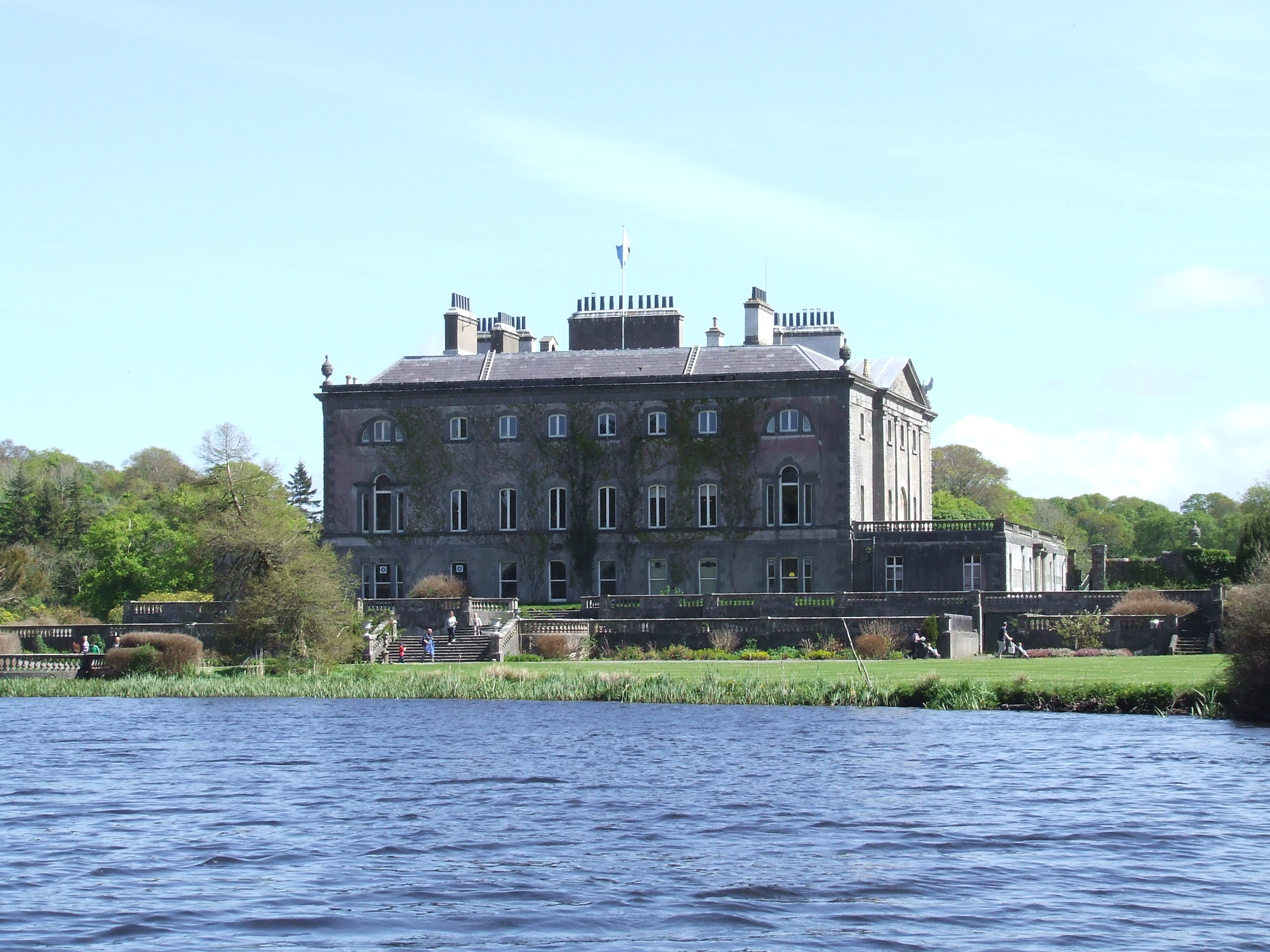
Western elevation from the boating lake, Easter Sunday, 2011

Colonel John Browne (1638–1711), built the first Westport House on the site of the O'Malley castle of Cahernamart. He married Maud Bourke, daughter of Theobald Bourke, 3rd Viscount Mayo and the great-great-granddaughter of Grace O'Malley. He was a Roman Catholic who fought on the Jacobite side in the War of the Two Kings. At that time, the house did not have the lake or a dam and the tide rose and fell against the walls.

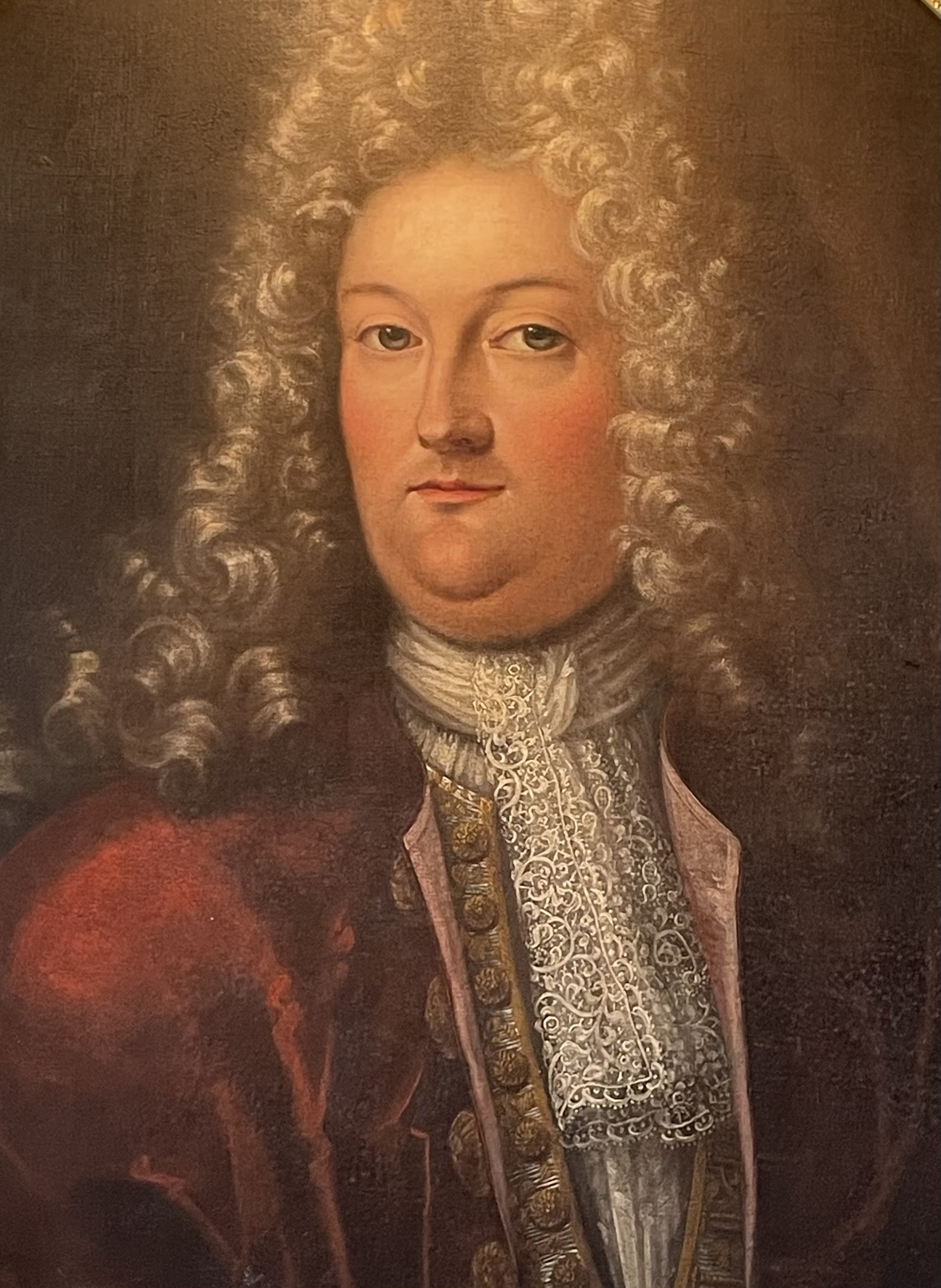
John Browne built the first Westport House and fought for the Jacobite cause, which was defeated.

His grandson, also John Browne, however, converted to the established Church of Ireland, and prospered. He later became First Earl of Altamont.

=== Modern house ===
The house was rebuilt by the Browne family in the 18th century to a design by the architect Richard Cassels in a Palladian style. This work corresponds with the modern east section of the house facing the town.

In 1773, Thomas Ivory later proposed additions however these plans were never executed and the house was later enlarged to a different plan, likely also by Ivory, around 1778.

James Wyatt later redesigned one of the interior dining rooms in 1781 while later in 1796 he designed a greenhouse for John Browne, 3rd Earl of Altamont.

In 1808, Henry Holland designed a gate towards the North East end of the town which was demolished around 1958.

In 1819, a South wing was added to the designs of Benjamin Wyatt. The wing, which contained a library, was burned soon after it was built around 1826 due to a defect in the heating system. It was subsequently rebuilt. After the fire, the Second Marquess covered in the open courtyard and made a new library by running a gallery around the now enclosed interior wall. The drawing room was reconstructed and the ceiling painted to represent sky, with cornices of painted Pompeian figures and a mantle piece by the then John Flaxman. He bought eighteen landscape pictures by the then unknown James A. O’Connor.

In 1858 George Wilkinson designed a grand Staircase of Sicilian marble for the Third Marquess of Sligo, replacing the library of the Second Marquess. This was made by Italian workmen. The balustrade of phosphor-bronze castings with the Browne eagle motif was by Skidmore, Coventry and cost around £6,000.

A model farm was built in the demesne during the early part of the 19th century, with accommodation for housing animals and animal feed. The remains of an old boathouse are open to the sea.

=== 21st century ===
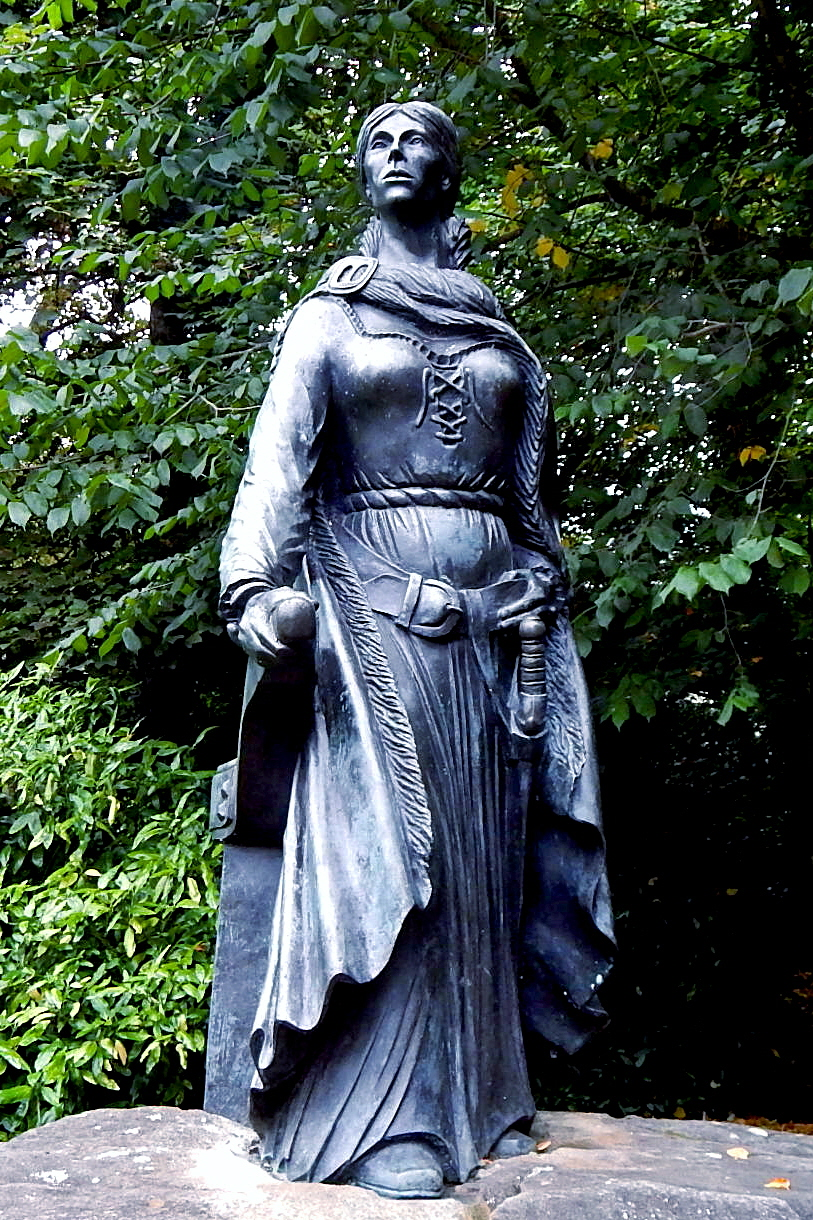
A statue of Grainne Mhaol Ni Mhaille was erected on the grounds of the house in 2003

In 2003, a bronze statue of Grainne Mhaol Ni Mhaille (Grace O'Malley), the 16th-century pirate queen, was unveiled on the grounds of the house. The seven-foot, four-inch sculpture was created by artist Michael Cooper, who was commissioned by Lord Altamont, proprietor of Westport House. The work was considered challenging due to the absence of surviving images of O'Malley. The statue depicts her as both a seafarer and a fighter, with one hand on the tiller and the other on her sword. Positioned to face the nearby water, it stands close to land once associated with her castles. Lord Altamont described the monument as a long-overdue tribute to his ancestor, while Dr T. K. Whitaker who performed the unveiling, highlighted O'Malley's historical significance as a powerful leader and early example of female achievement.

In 2007, the privately owned estate received a grant of €1.314m for repairs to Westport House, from the state funded Heritage Council.

After the death of the 11th Marquess of Sligo in July 2014, the house passed to his five daughters, as a result of private legislation passed by Seanad in 1993, enabling him to disinherit his cousin Sebastian Browne, the heir to the peerages and estate.

In October 2015, it was revealed that the Westport House Estate was in NAMA for debts secured on the 380-acre (150 ha) estate, but not the house, for almost €10 million.

On 17 January 2017, the daughters of the 11th Marquess sold Westport House to the Hughes family, a local business family in Westport, ending the Browne family's association with Westport House lasting hundreds of years. The Hughes family planned to spend €50 million on refurbishment.

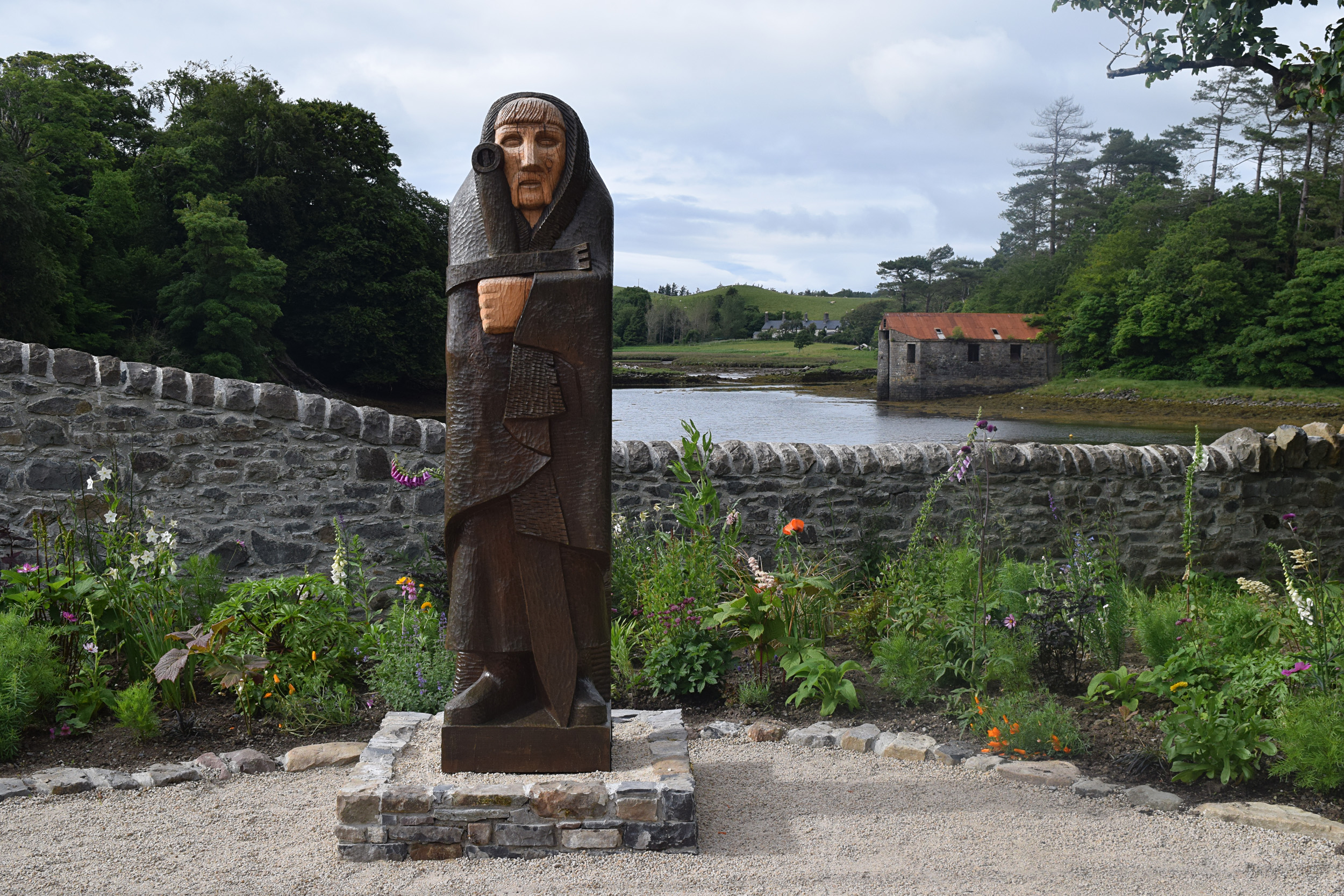
An Saighdiúir statue at the quay entrance

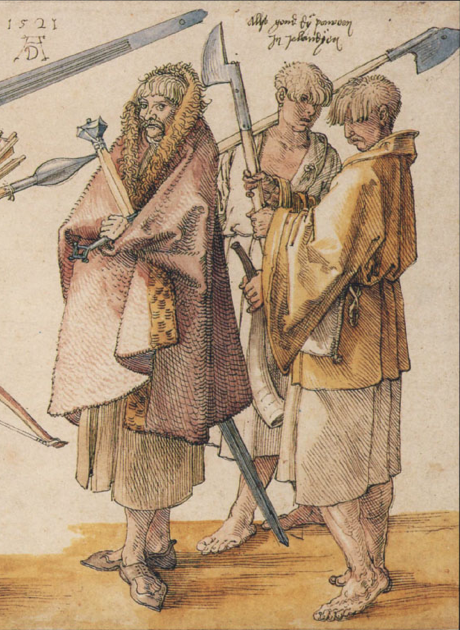
Illustration by Albrecht Dürer upon which the statue was based

In April 2022, after completing his "Climb with Charlie" fundraiser on Croagh Patrick, journalist and broadcaster Charlie Bird donated a wooden sculpture to Westport House as a gesture of thanks to the local community. The piece, titled An Saighdiúir (The Soldier), was created by Wicklow sculptor Seighean Ó Draoi. Standing eight feet tall and carved from Lebanese Cedar, it represents an ancient Irish soldier. The design was influenced by a 1521 work of German artist Albrecht Dürer depicting Irish fighters in Europe, and also draws on the history of dispossessed Irish known as Kerns and Tories, who resisted English settlement in the 16th century. Bird, accompanied by his wife Claire and their dog Tiger, presented the sculpture at the Quay entrance to Westport House. It was accepted by Harry and Cathal Hughes, owners of the estate, along with estate and construction manager Michael King. The donation followed Bird’s fundraising climb of Croagh Patrick in 2021, which raised more than €3.6 million for the Irish Motor Neurone Disease Association and Pieta House.

In Summer 2026, The Grace, a new 129-bedroom luxury hotel at Westport Estate, was officially opened by Taoiseach Micheál Martin. The hotel had quietly welcomed its first guests earlier in the year before its formal opening in June. Developed by the Hughes family as part of the wider redevelopment of Westport Estate, the project formed a central element of a long-term strategy to establish the estate as an international visitor destination while supporting tourism, employment and regional economic development in County Mayo. Located within the estate's 430 acres, the hotel was designed to reflect the surrounding landscape and heritage, taking inspiration from both Grace O'Malley and Grace Kelly.

The Grace was designed by Mayo-based architect Taylor McCarney, with interiors by GW Design, and features luxury accommodation, multiple dining venues focused on seasonal local produce, a spa and wellness centre, event facilities, and access to the estate's walking trails and attractions. The development created more than 140 jobs and forms part of the Hughes family's broader programme of investment, which also includes the restoration of the estate's landscape and visitor experiences.

== Architecture ==
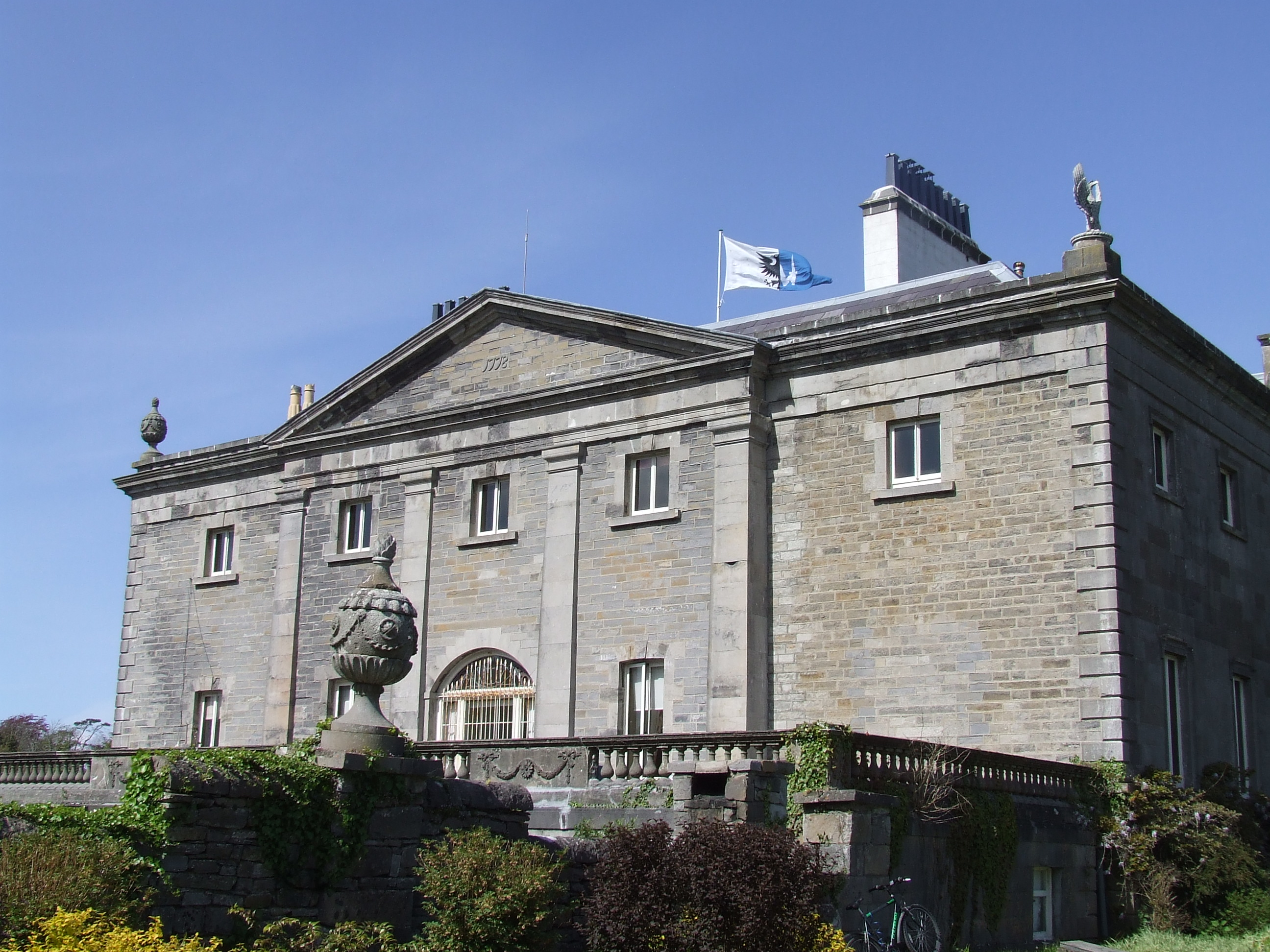
Southern facade. Easter Saturday, 2011, showing 1778 date in pediment.

The east front of the house was built around 1730 by Colonel John Browne's grandson, also John – 1st Earl of Altamont, who hired the architect Richard Cassels. It is built with limestone taken from the quarry south of the estate.

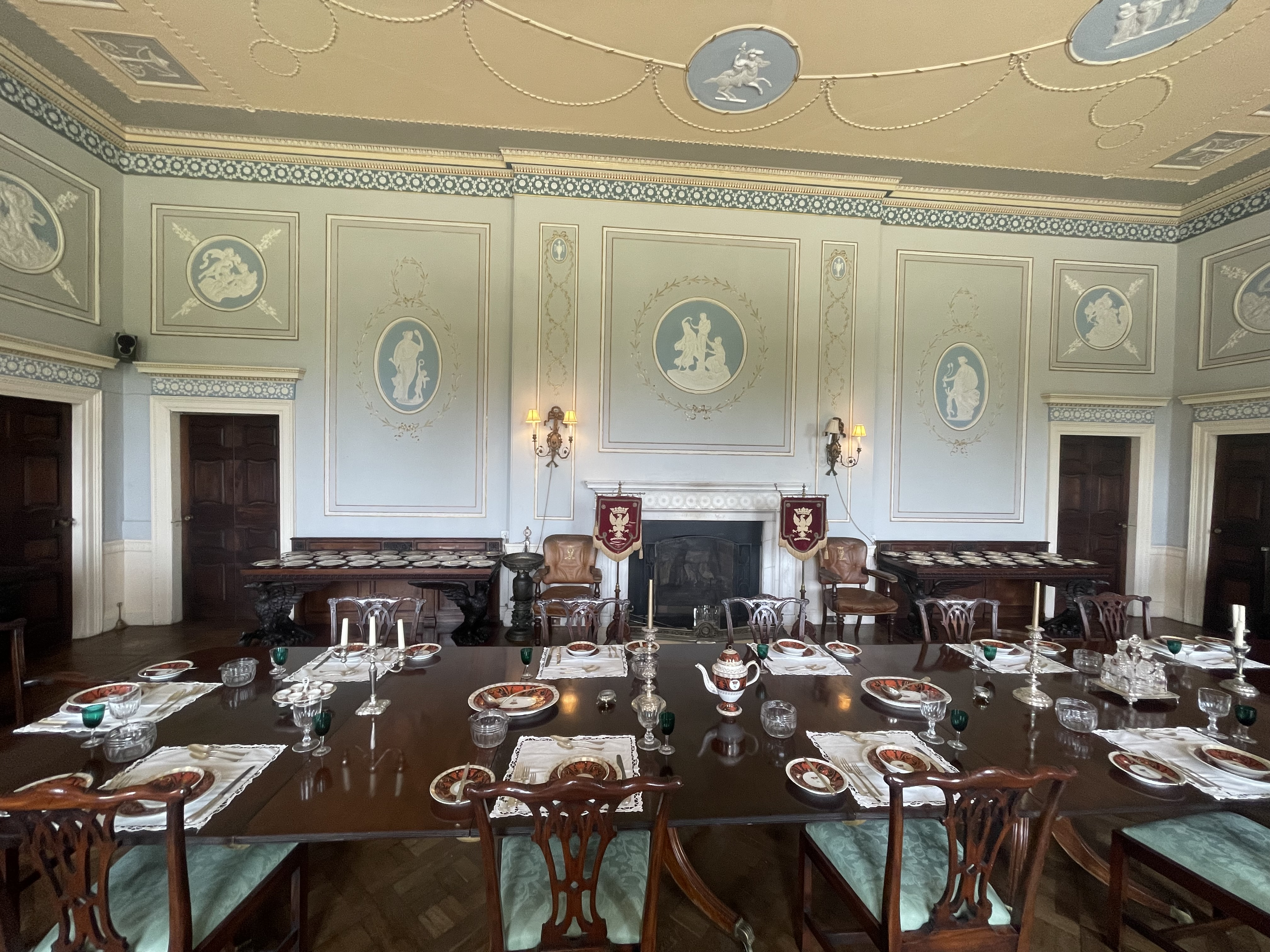
The Large Dining Room at Westport House

The doors are mahogany brought back from the family estates in Jamaica There are still a number of original Wyatt drawings on show, along with some of his son's, Benjamin Wyatt. The wings on the north and south sides of the house were built by Wyatt junior. The staircase and enclosure of the lightwell in the middle of the house was undertaken later. The last part of the development was the creation of the terraces on the west side of the house.

=== Interiors, art and antiques ===
As of 2023, the house still contains most of the original contents acquired by the Browne family.

Among the paintings are portraits by Sir Joshua Reynolds of the 1st Earl of Altamont, of the Rt. Hon. Denis Browne, brother of the 1st Marquess of Sligo and a member of Grattan's Parliament; and by William Beechey, of Howe Peter – the 2nd Marquess of Sligo, who spent four months in an English jail for bribing British seamen in time of war to bring his ship, full of antiquities from Greece, to Westport. Howe Peter was a friend of George IV and the poet Byron. There is a portrait of Earl Howe – Admiral of the Fleet, father of the 1st Marchioness of Sligo, by John Singleton Copley. Artworks also include a collection of landscapes painted in the locality by James Arthur O'Connor. Other artists such as Chalon, Barrett, Gibson, John Opie, Brooks and Lavery are part of the collection. In the alcove on the marble staircase stands the marble Angel of Welcome by American sculptor Charles Francis Fuller, which the Third Marquess purchased in Rome in 1862. The flame on the forehead represents the Holy Spirit.

Other original items on show in Westport House are a fine collection of old English and Irish silver, which include some 18th-century Irish "potato" or dish rings; Waterford glass; a library with many old Irish books and the Mayo Legion Flag which was brought to Ireland by General Humbert when he invaded the country in 1798, and which has been in Westport House since. Westport House was occupied by General Humbert's troops.

== Browne family ==
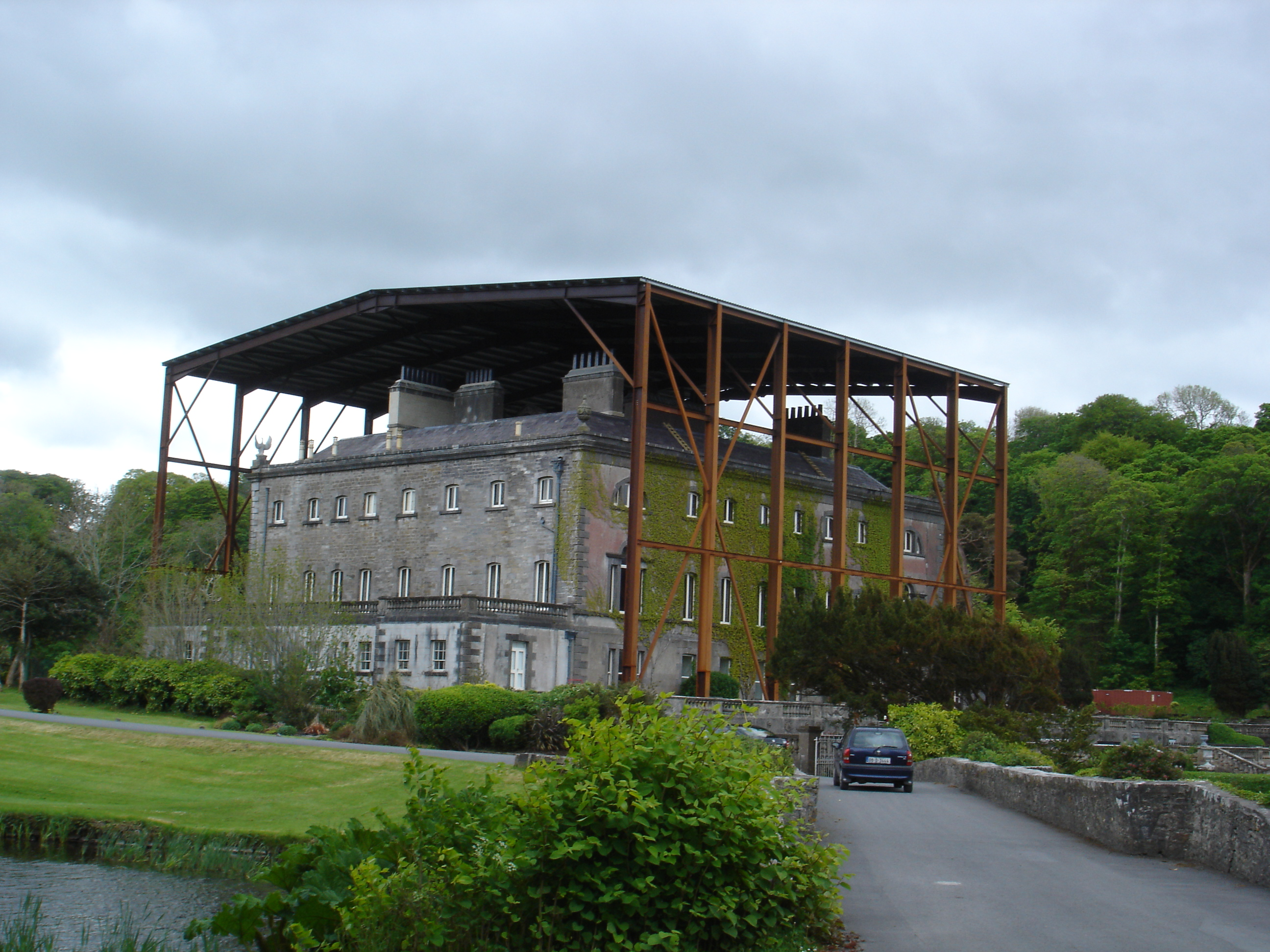
Westport House being repaired in 2007

The Browne family remained the owners of Westport House for almost three hundred years, until 17 January 2017.

The Browne family came to County Mayo from Sussex, England in the sixteenth century. Through marriage with the daughters of native Irish landowners and by purchase they built up a small estate near The Neale. As a Catholic family they were fortunate that their lands were situated in Connacht, thereby escaping the notorious confiscations of Oliver Cromwell.

== Music and performing arts ==
On 23 and 24 June 2012, the inaugural Westport Festival of Music and Performing Arts took place at Westport House. Some of the acts that performed there were Jools Holland, The Waterboys, Ryan Sheridan, Imelda May, Seasick Steve, Mundy, and Royseven.

On 26–27 August 2017, Aiken Promotions used Westport House as one of two venues for the first Harvest Country Music Festival. Acts performing included headliners Miranda Lambert & Nathan Carter.

== See also ==
- Hazelwood House, Sligo
