= 2012 Illinois Senate election =

Illinois Senate elections, 2012
- November 6, 2012

All 59 seats in the Illinois State Senate 30 seats needed for a majority
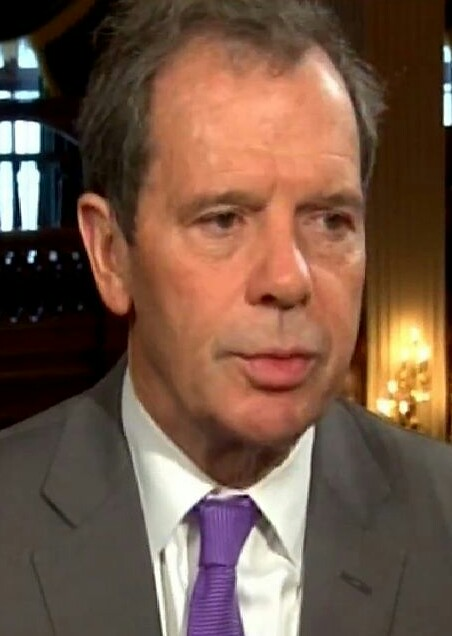

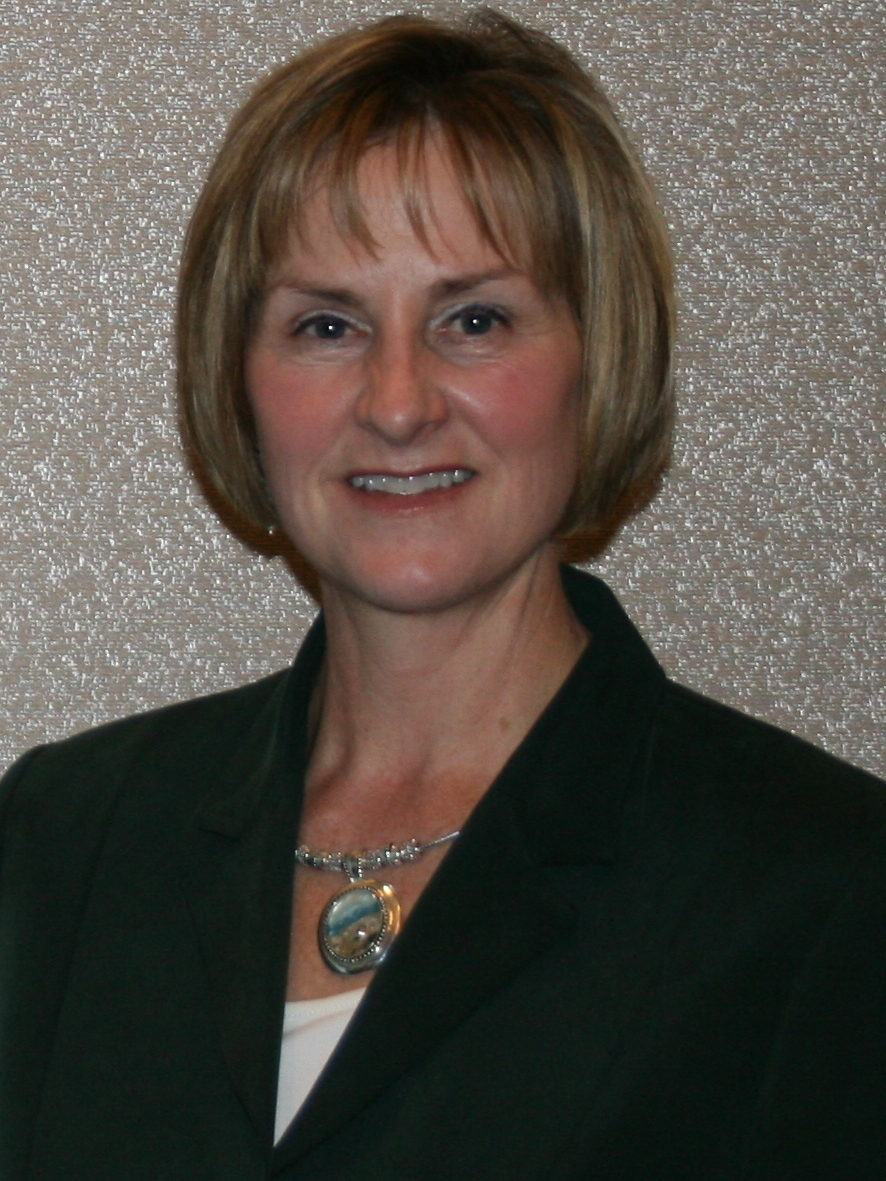
	Majority party	Minority party
Leader	John Cullerton	Christine Radogno
Party	Democratic	Republican
Leader's seat	6th-Chicago	41st-La Grange
Last election	35	24
Seats won	40	19
Seat change	▲5	▼5
Popular vote	2,528,684	2,017,014
Percentage	55.63%	44.37%
Swing	▲1.16%	▼1.16%
- Democratic gain Republican gain Democratic hold Republican hold 50–60% 60–70% >90% 50–60% 60–70% >90%
President before election
John Cullerton
Democratic
President-Elect
John Cullerton
Democratic

The Illinois State Senate Election of 2012 was held on November 6, 2012. Elections were held in all 59 senate seats because the election followed a redistricting of the state's legislative districts.

== Predictions ==
Source	Ranking	As of
Governing	Safe D	October 24, 2012

== List of candidates ==
=== District 1 ===
March 30 Democratic primary candidates:
- Adolfo Mondragon
- Antonio Munoz Incumbent Munoz was first elected to the Senate in 1998.
Note: Edgar Diaz was running but was removed from the ballot on January 4, 2012.

March 30 Republican primary candidates:
- No candidates have filed.

November 6 general election candidates:

=== District 2 ===
March 20 Democratic primary candidates:
- William Delgado Incumbent Delgado was first elected to the Senate in 1996.

March 20 GOP primary candidates:
- No candidates have filed.

November 6 general election candidates:

=== District 3 ===
March 20 Democratic primary candidates:
- Mattie Hunter Incumbent Hunter was first elected to the Senate in 2002.

Note: Larry D. Craddieth was running but withdrew from the race on December 28.

March 20 GOP primary candidates:

- No candidates have filed.

November 6 general election candidates:

=== District 4 ===
March 20 Democratic primary candidates:
- Kimberly Lightford Incumbent Lightford was first elected to the Senate in 1998.

March 20 GOP primary candidates:

- No candidates have filed.

November 6 general election candidates:

=== District 5 ===
March 20 Democratic primary candidates:
- Patricia Van Pelt Watkins
- Annazette Collins Incumbent Collins was first elected to the Senate in 2011.

March 20 GOP primary candidates:
- No candidates have filed.

November 6 general election candidates:

- Patricia Van Pelt Watkins won her primary against Annazette Collins

=== District 6 ===
March 20 Democratic primary candidates:
- John Cullerton Incumbent Cullerton was first elected to the Senate in 1990.

March 20 GOP primary candidates:

- No candidates have filed.

November 6 general election candidates:

=== District 7 ===
March 20 Democratic primary candidates:
- Heather Steans Incumbent Steans was first elected to the Senate in 2008.

March 20 GOP primary candidates:

- No candidates have filed.

November 6 general election candidates:

=== District 8 ===
March 20 Democratic primary candidates:
- Ira Silverstein Incumbent Silverstein was first elected to the Senate in 1998.

March 20 GOP primary candidates:
- No candidates have filed.

November 6 general election candidates:

=== District 9 ===
Note: Incumbent Jeffrey Schoenberg (D) is not running for re-election.

March 20 Democratic primary candidates:
- Daniel Biss Biss is the current District 17 incumbent in the House.

March 20 GOP primary candidates:

- Marc Levine

November 6 general election candidates:

=== District 10 ===
March 20 Democratic primary candidates:
- John G. Mulroe Incumbent Mulroe was first elected to the Senate in 2010.

March 20 GOP primary candidates:
- No candidates have filed.

November 6 general election candidates:

=== District 11 ===
Note: Incumbent Steve Landek (D) is not running for re-election in District 11. Instead he is running in District 12.

March 20 Democratic primary candidates:
- Martin Sandoval Incumbent Sandoval, of District 12, was first elected to the Senate in 2002.

March 20 GOP primary candidates:

- No candidates have filed.

November 6 general election candidates:

=== District 12 ===
Note: Incumbent Martin Sandoval (D) is not running for re-election in District 12. Instead he is running in District 11.

March 20 Democratic primary candidates:
- Steven Landek Incumbent Landek, of District 11, was first appointed to the Senate in 2011.

- Raul Montes, Jr.

March 20 GOP primary candidates:
- No candidates have filed.

November 6 general election candidates:

=== District 13 ===
March 20 Democratic primary candidates:
- Kwame Raoul Incumbent Raoul was first appointed to the Senate in 2004.

March 20 GOP primary candidates:

- No candidates have filed.

November 6 general election candidates:

=== District 14 ===
March 20 Democratic primary candidates:
- Emil Jones III Incumbent Jones was first elected to the Senate in 2008.
Note Richard J. Lewandowski filed to run but withdrew from the race January 9, 2012.
March 20 GOP primary candidates:

- No candidates have filed.

November 6 general election candidates:

=== District 15 ===
Note: Incumbent James Meeks (D) is not running for re-election.

March 20 Democratic primary candidates:
- Patricia Mahon
- Joseph Letke, Jr.
- Donna Miller
- Napoleon Harris

Note: Marquise D. Alston filed to run but was removed from the ballot on January 12, 2012.

March 20 GOP primary candidates:

- No candidates have filed.

November 6 general election candidates:

=== District 16 ===
March 20 Democratic primary candidates:
- Jacqueline Collins Incumbent Collins was first elected to the Senate in 2003.

March 20 GOP primary candidates:

- No candidates have filed.

November 6 general election candidates:

=== District 17 ===
March 20 Democratic primary candidates:
- Donne Trotter Incumbent Trotter was first elected to the Senate in 1993.

March 20 GOP primary candidates:

- No candidates have filed.

November 6 general election candidates:

=== District 18 ===
Note: Incumbent Edward Maloney (D) is not running for re-election.

March 20 Democratic primary candidates:
- Bill Cunningham Cunningham is currently the District 35 incumbent in the State House.

March 20 GOP primary candidates:
- Barbara Ruth Bellar
- Ricardo Fernandez

November 6 general election candidates:

=== District 19 ===
Note: Incumbent Maggie Crotty initially filed to run but announced on December 29, 2011 that she would be withdrawing.
March 20 Democratic primary candidates:
- Michael Hastings
- Gregory Hannon
March 20 GOP primary candidates:

- No candidates have filed.

November 6 general election candidates:

=== District 20 ===
March 20 Democratic primary candidates:
- Iris Martinez Incumbent Martinez was first elected to the Senate in 2003.

March 20 GOP primary candidates:

- No candidates have filed.

November 6 general election candidates:

=== District 21 ===
Note: Incumbent Ron Sandack (R) is not running for re-election.

March 20 Democratic primary candidates:
- No candidates have filed.

March 20 GOP primary candidates:

- Michael Connelly Connelly is currently the District 48 incumbent in the State House.

November 6 general election candidates:

=== District 22 ===
March 20 Democratic primary candidates:
- Michael Noland Incumbent Noland was first elected to the Senate in 2007.
- Tim Elenz

March 20 GOP primary candidates:

- No candidates have filed.

November 6 general election candidates:

=== District 23 ===
Democratic primary candidates:
- Kevin Allen
- Greg Brownfield
- Tom Cullerton, Village President of Villa Park

Republican primary candidates:
- Carole Pankau, State Senator first elected to the Senate in 2005.
- Randy Ramey, State Rep in District 55

November 6 general election candidates:

=== District 24 ===
March 20 Democratic primary candidates:
- A. Ghani

March 20 GOP primary candidates:

- Kirk Dillard Incumbent Dillard was first elected to the Senate in 1993.
- Chris Nybo Nybo is currently the District 41 incumbent in the State House.

November 6 general election candidates:

=== District 25 ===
Note: Incumbent Chris Lauzen (R) is not running for re-election.

March 20 Democratic primary candidates:
- Corinne Pierog
- Steven L. Hunter

March 20 GOP primary candidates:
- Jim Oberweis
- Dave Richmond
- Richard Slocum

November 6 general election candidates:

=== District 26 ===
March 20 Democratic primary candidates:
- Amanda Howland

March 20 GOP primary candidates:
- Dan Duffy Incumbent Duffy was first elected to the Senate in 2009.

November 6 general election candidates:

=== District 27 ===
March 20 Democratic primary candidates:
- No candidates have filed.

March 20 GOP primary candidates:
- Matt Murphy Incumbent Murphy was first elected to the Senate in 2007.

November 6 general election candidates:

=== District 28 ===
Note: Incumbent John Millner (R) is not running for re-election.

March 20 Democratic primary candidates:
- Daniel Kotowski Kotowski is currently the District 33 incumbent in the State Senate.

March 20 GOP primary candidates:
- Jim O'Donnell
- Gayle Smolinski

November 6 general election candidates:

=== District 29 ===
Note: Incumbent Susan Garrett (D) is not running for re-election.

March 20 Democratic primary candidates:
- Julie Morrison
- Milton J. Sumption

March 20 GOP primary candidates:
- Arie Friedman

November 6 general election candidates:

=== District 30 ===
March 20 Democratic primary candidates:
- Terry Link Incumbent Link was first elected to the Senate in 1997.

March 20 GOP primary candidates:
- Don Castella
Note: Gregory S. Jacobs was removed from the ballot on January 9, 2012.

November 6 general election candidates:

=== District 31 ===
Note: Incumbent Suzi Schmidt (R) is not running for re-election.

March 20 Democratic primary candidates:
- Melinda Bush

March 20 GOP primary candidates:
- Linwood "Lennie" Jarratt
- Lawrence Leafblad
- Michael White
- Joe Neal

November 6 general election candidates:

=== District 32 ===
March 20 Democratic primary candidates:
- No candidates have filed.

March 20 GOP primary candidates:
- Pamela Althoff Incumbent Althoff was first elected to the Senate in 2003.

November 6 general election candidates:

=== District 33 ===
Note: Incumbent Dan Kotowski (D) is not running for re-election in District 33. Instead he is running in District 28.

March 20 Democratic primary candidates:
- No candidates have filed.

March 20 GOP primary candidates:
- Karen McConnaughay
- Cliff Surges

Note: Craig M. Powers was running but withdrew from the race on December 23.

November 6 general election candidates:

=== District 34 ===
Note: Incumbent Dave Syverson (R) is not running for re-election in District 34. Instead he is running in District 35.

March 20 Democratic primary candidates:
- Dan Lewandowski
- Steve Stadelman
- Glenn Patterson
- Marla Wilson

Note: Jim Hughes withdrew from the race on December 12.

March 20 GOP primary candidates:
- Frank Gambino

November 6 general election candidates:

=== District 35 ===
March 20 Democratic primary candidates:
- No candidates have filed.

March 20 GOP primary candidates:
- Dave Syverson Incumbent Syverson, of District 34, was first elected to the Senate in 1993.
- Christine J. Johnson Incumbent Johnson was first elected to the Senate in 2011.

November 6 general election candidates:

=== District 36 ===
March 20 Democratic primary candidates:
- Mike Jacobs Incumbent Jacobs was first elected to the Senate in 2005.
- Mike Boland, former Illinois State Rep from 1971-2011

March 20 GOP primary candidates:
- Bill Albracht

November 6 general election candidates:

=== District 37 ===
March 20 Democratic primary candidates:
- No candidates have filed.

March 20 GOP primary candidates:
- Darin LaHood Incumbent LaHood was first elected to the Senate in 2011.

November 6 general election candidates:

=== District 38 ===
March 20 Democratic primary candidates:
- Christine Benson
- Tom Ganiere
- Kevin Kunkel

March 20 GOP primary candidates:
- Sue Rezin Incumbent Rezin was first elected to the Senate in 2010.

November 6 general election candidates:

=== District 39 ===
March 20 Democratic primary candidates:
- Don Harmon Incumbent Harmon was first elected to the Senate in 2003.

March 20 GOP primary candidates:
- No candidates have filed.

November 6 general election candidates:

=== District 40 ===
March 20 Democratic primary candidates:
- Toi Hutchinson Incumbent Hutchinson was first elected to the Senate in 2009.

March 20 GOP primary candidates:
- No candidates have filed.

November 6 general election candidates:

=== District 41 ===
March 20 Democratic primary candidates:
- No candidates have filed.

March 20 GOP primary candidates:
- Christine Radogno Incumbent Radogno was first elected to the Senate in 1997.
Note: Duane Bradley was removed from the ballot on January 9, 2012 for having insufficient signatures.

November 6 general election candidates:

=== District 42 ===
March 20 Democratic primary candidates:
- Linda Holmes Incumbent Holmes was first elected to the Senate in 2007.

March 20 GOP primary candidates:
- Peter Hurtado

November 6 general election candidates:

=== District 43 ===
March 20 Democratic primary candidates:
- Arthur Wilhelmi Incumbent Wilhelmi was first elected to the Senate in 2005.

March 20 GOP primary candidates:
- Sandy Johnson

November 6 general election candidates:

=== District 44 ===
March 20 Democratic primary candidates:
- No candidates have filed.

March 20 GOP primary candidates:
- Bill Brady Incumbent LaHood was first elected to the Senate in 2002.

November 6 general election candidates:

=== District 45 ===
March 20 Democratic primary candidates:
- No candidates have filed.

March 20 GOP primary candidates:
- Tim Bivins Incumbent Bivins was first elected to the Senate in 2009.

November 6 general election candidates:

=== District 46 ===
March 20 Democratic primary candidates:
- Dave Koehler Incumbent Koehler was first elected to the Senate in 2006.
- James Polk
- Marvin Bainter
Note: G. Allen Mayer withdrew from the race on December 2, 2011.

March 20 GOP primary candidates:
- Pat Sullivan

November 6 general election candidates:

=== District 47 ===
March 20 Democratic primary candidates:
- John Sullivan Incumbent Sullivan was first elected to the Senate in 2003.

March 20 GOP primary candidates:
- Randy Frese

November 6 general election candidates:

=== District 48 ===
Note: Incumbent Tom Johnson (R) is not running for re-election.

March 20 Democratic primary candidates:
- Andy Manar

March 20 GOP primary candidates:
- Mike McElroy

November 6 general election candidates:

=== District 49 ===
Note: Incumbent William "Sam" McCann (R) is not running for re-election in District 49. Instead he is running in District 50.

March 20 Democratic primary candidates:
- Jennifer Bertino-Tarrant

March 20 GOP primary candidates:
- Gary Fitzgerald
- Anthony Giles
- Garrett Peck
- Brian Smith

November 6 general election candidates:

=== District 50 ===
Note: Incumbent Larry Bomke (R) is not running for re-election.

March 20 Democratic primary candidates:
- No candidates have filed.

March 20 GOP primary candidates:
- Steven Dove
- William McCann Incumbent McCann was first elected to the Senate in 2011.
- Gray Noll

November 6 general election candidates:

=== District 51 ===
Note: Incumbent Kyle McCarter (R) is not running for re-election in District 51. Instead he is running in District 54.

March 20 Democratic primary candidates:
- No candidates have filed.

March 20 GOP primary candidates:
- Tom Pliura
- Chapin Rose Rose is currently the District 110 incumbent in the State House.

November 6 general election candidates:

=== District 52 ===
March 20 Democratic primary candidates:
- Mike Frerichs Incumbent Frerichs was first elected to the Senate in 2006.

March 20 GOP primary candidates:
- No candidates have filed.
Note: Alan Nudo withdrew from the race on January 21, 2012.

November 6 general election candidates:

=== District 53 ===
March 20 Democratic primary candidates:
- No candidates have filed.

March 20 GOP primary candidates:
- Jason Barickman Barickman is currently the District 105 incumbent in the State House.
- Shane Cultra Incumbent Cultra was first elected to the Senate in 2011.

November 6 general election candidates:

=== District 54 ===
March 20 Democratic primary candidates:
- Danny L. Stover

March 20 GOP primary candidates:
- Kyle McCarter Incumbent McCarter was first elected to the Senate in 2009.
Note: John O. Jones withdrew from the race on January 4, 2012. Incumbent Jones was first elected to the Senate in 2003.

November 6 general election candidates:

=== District 55 ===
March 20 Democratic primary candidates:
- No candidates have filed.

March 20 GOP primary candidates:
- Dale A. Righter Incumbent Righter was first elected to the Senate in 2003.

November 6 general election candidates:

=== District 56 ===
March 20 Democratic primary candidates:
- William Haine Incumbent Haine was first elected to the Senate in 2002.

March 20 GOP primary candidates:
- Mike Babcock

November 6 general election candidates:

=== District 57 ===
March 20 Democratic primary candidates:
- James Clayborne Jr. Incumbent Clayborne was first elected to the Senate in 1995.
- Wyatt Frazer

March 20 GOP primary candidates:
- Dave Barnes

November 6 general election candidates:

=== District 58 ===
March 20 Democratic primary candidates:
- No candidates have filed.

March 20 GOP primary candidates:
- David Luechtefeld Incumbent Luechtefeld was first elected to the Senate in 1995.

November 6 general election candidates:

=== District 59 ===
March 20 Democratic primary candidates:
- Fred Kondritz
- Gary Forby Incumbent Forby was first elected to the Senate in 2003.

March 20 GOP primary candidates:
- Mark Minor
- Ken Burzynski

November 6 general election candidates:
