= 2008 Illinois's 14th congressional district special election =

- March 8, 2008

Illinois's 14th congressional district
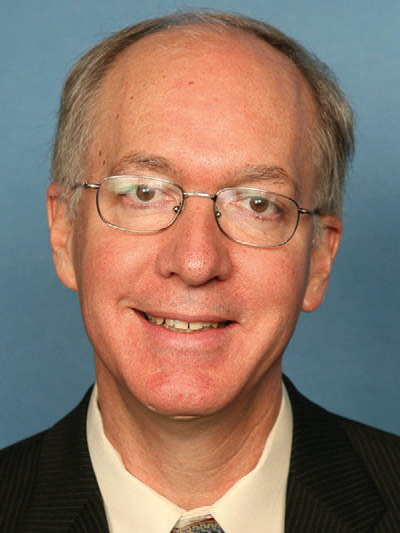

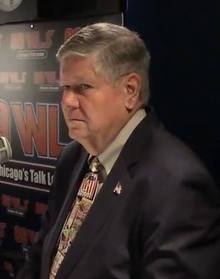
Nominee	Bill Foster	Jim Oberweis
Party	Democratic	Republican
Popular vote	52,205	47,180
Percentage	52.53%	47.47%
- County results Foster: 50–60% Oberweis: 50–60% 60–70%
U.S. Representative before election
Dennis Hastert
Republican
Elected U.S. Representative
Bill Foster
Democratic

After incumbent United States Representative Dennis Hastert, a Republican who had previously served as the 51st Speaker of the United States House of Representatives, resigned from his House seat representing Illinois's 14th congressional district on November 26, 2007, a special election was held to fill the vacancy for the remainder of the 110th United States Congress.

Illinois Governor Rod Blagojevich scheduled the special election to occur on March 8, 2008. The Democratic and Republican parties concurrently held special primary elections on February 5, 2008. After winning the primary, Democrat Bill Foster won the election on March 8, 2008.

== Democratic primary ==
=== Candidates ===
- Bill Foster, physicist and business owner
- John Laesch, Democratic nominee for this district in 2006
- Jotham Stein, attorney

=== Results ===
Democratic Primary results
Party	Candidate	Votes	%
Democratic	Bill Foster	32,982	49.60
Democratic	John Laesch	28,433	42.76
Democratic	Jotham Stein	5,082	7.64
Total votes		66,497	100.00

== Republican primary ==
=== Candidates ===
- Jim Oberweis, 2002 Republican candidate for the U.S. Senate, 2004 Republican candidate for the U.S. Senate, 2006 Republican candidate for Governor, owner of Oberweis Dairy
- Chris Lauzen, Illinois State Senator

=== Campaign ===
Chris Lauzen officially began his campaign on September 19, 2007. Rudy Clai officially entered the race on October 7, but withdrew less than a month later, citing dysfunction within the Illinois Republican Party.

The race was very competitive between Lauzen and Oberweis. On January 15, 2008, they debated at Aurora University. During the debate, Oberweis raised questions regarding International Profit Associates, a company that donated $100,000 to Lauzen's campaign and was being investigated for widespread sexual harassment and fraud.

The Chicago Tribune endorsed Oberweis, stating that had a better command on national issues. Dennis Hastert endorsed Oberweis on December 13, and Kevin Burns subsequently withdrew his candidacy. Lauzen received endorsements from the Aurora Beacon News, the Kane County Chronicle, the DeKalb Daily Chronicle and the Chicago Daily Herald.

=== Results ===
Republican Primary results
Party	Candidate	Votes	%
Republican	Jim Oberweis	41,980	56.02
Republican	Chris Lauzen	32,955	43.98
Total votes		74,935	100.00

== General election ==
=== Negative advertisement campaign ===
The race for the 14th district was marked by intense negative campaigning between the regular primary elections of February 5 and the special elections of March 8. Oberweis, with $2.3 million of his own money and an additional $1 million provided by the National Republican Congressional Committee, attacked Foster on his various political stances. Foster, with $1.8 million of his own money and an additional $1 million provided by the Democratic Congressional Campaign Committee, countered that Oberweis had employed illegal immigrants in his retail stores.

Democratic presidential candidate Barack Obama appeared in a television ad for Foster that ran immediately prior to the special election. John McCain endorsed Oberweis.

=== Endorsements ===
The Chicago Tribune endorsed Bill Foster for the seat in its March 4, 2008 edition based on Oberweis' history of "nasty, smug, condescending ... and dishonest" campaigning, and Foster's position that he would be a Blue Dog Democrat. The Chicago Sun-Times endorsed Oberweis as "forceful and informed", painting Foster as "poorly informed" and unable to discuss specific issues in depth.

=== Results ===
Illinois's 14th congressional district special election, 2008
Party	Candidate	Votes	%
Democratic	Bill Foster	52,205	52.53
Republican	Jim Oberweis	47,180	47.47
Total votes		99,385	100.00
Democratic gain from Republican			

The election of Foster over Oberweis ended a 20-year Republican streak of holding the seat. The election of Foster also brought speculation that Republicans would lose three more seats up for re-election in the November general election, resulting in a 14–5 Democratic advantage in Congress for Illinois.

Observers cited several factors explaining Foster's victory, including rapid suburbanization of Kane and Kendall Counties, Foster's position regarding the expansion of health-care and his support of immigration-reform, including a path to citizenship, and Lauzen's refusal to endorse Oberweis following the Republican primary. In contrast, Oberweis' campaign tactics were criticized, including the overuse of mass mailings and automated phone calls to remind voters of the special election. Reporter John Fund of The Wall Street Journal pointed to the failure of Lauzen to endorse Oberweis, Hastert's preference for "self-funded" but unskilled candidates, and local reviews that the NRCC ads were "nasty," "stupid," "largely incomprehensible" and "factless" as additional reasons why Foster won the seat. By contrast, Fund noted that the Democratic party spent much of its funding on an ad featuring Obama touting Foster's credentials as a physicist and problem-solver.

Governor Rod Blagojevich had scheduled the special election for Saturday, March 8 in an attempt to increase voter turnout. However, the election drew a low voter turnout, with only 22 percent of registered voters participating.

Although it was initially thought that Foster would not be sworn in until April due to the need to count absentee ballots before the election would be certified, he took the oath of office on March 11. On his first day in office he cast the deciding vote to keep from tabling an ethics bill that would create an independent outside panel to investigate ethics complaints against House members.

Foster's victory was the first time a House seat flipped parties in a special election since Democrat Stephanie Herseth Sandlin won the open South Dakota at-large seat of Republican Bill Janklow in June 2004.

== See also ==
- List of special elections to the United States House of Representatives
- 2008 United States House of Representatives elections in Illinois
- 2008 Louisiana's 6th congressional district special election
- 2008 Mississippi's 1st congressional district special election
