= Oberweis =

Oberweis may refer to:

- Oberweis, Germany, in Rhineland-Palatinate
- Oberweis Dairy, a dairy in North Aurora, Illinois
- Jim Oberweis (born 1946), American businessman, investment manager, and Illinois politician
