= John H. Cox =

American attorney, businessman, broadcaster, and political activist

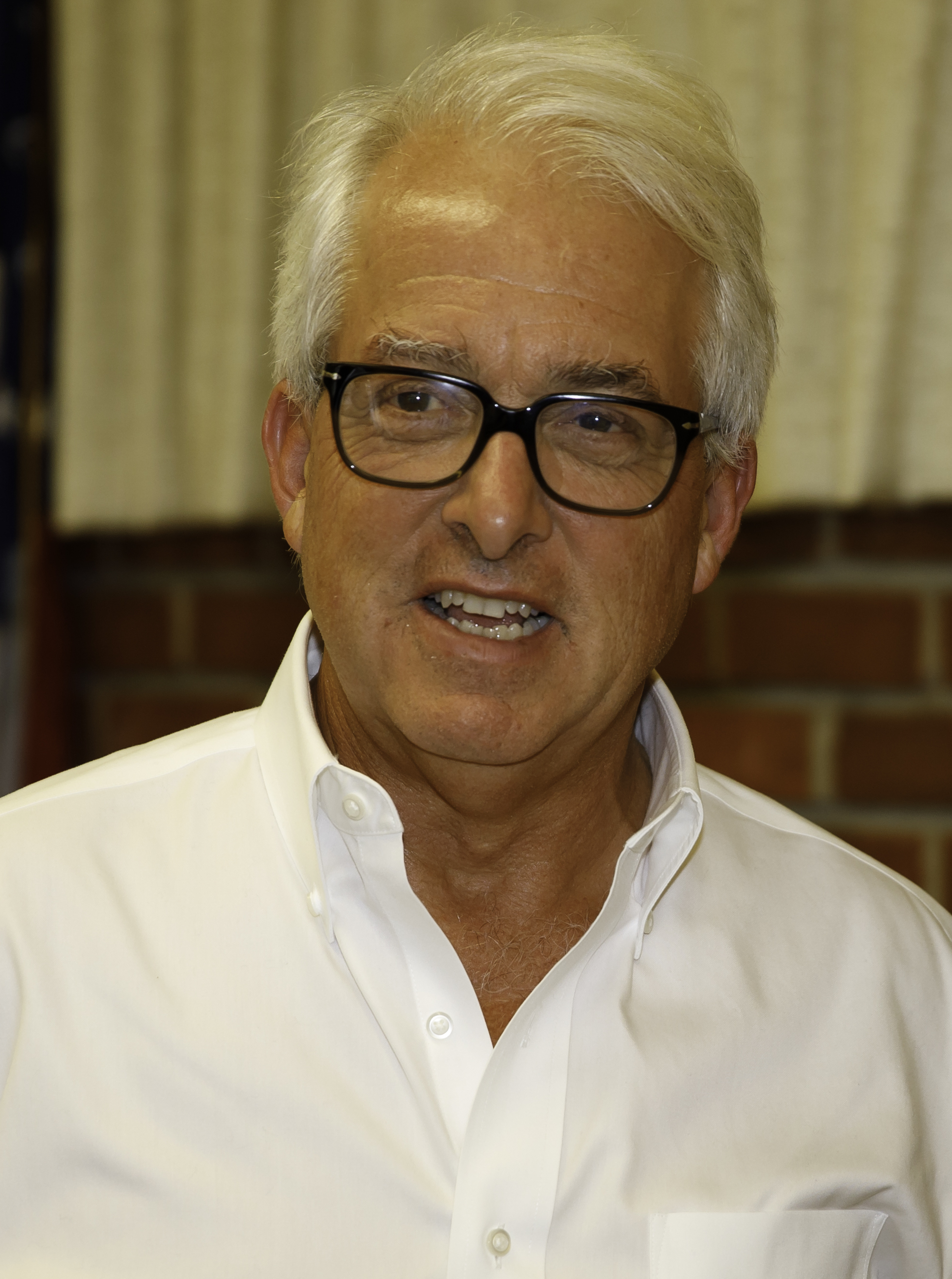
- Cox in 2017
- Born: John Kaplan; July 15, 1955 (age 71); Chicago, Illinois, US
- Education: University of Illinois Chicago (BA); Illinois Institute of Technology (JD)
- Political party: Republican (2000–present)
- Other political affiliations: Democratic (before 2000)
- Spouse(s): Nancy (divorced); Sarah Cox
- Children: 4
- Website: Official website

John Herman Cox (né Kaplan; born July 15, 1955) is an American businessman, housing developer, political activist, and perennial candidate. A Republican, he was the party's nominee for Governor of California in 2018, as well as one of the party's replacement candidates in the state's 2021 recall election.

Cox began his political career as a Democrat, as he ran to be a delegate to that party's 1976 National Convention. He later became a Republican in Illinois, running for a congressional seat in 2000, United States Senate in 2002, Cook County Recorder of Deeds in 2004, and President of the United States in 2008.

After moving to California, he proposed the California is not for Sale initiative to combat corruption. Cox became the Republican nominee in the 2018 California gubernatorial election, after placing second in the state's June 5 nonpartisan blanket primary. On November 6, 2018, he lost to Democrat Gavin Newsom in the state's biggest gubernatorial landslide since 1950. Cox was a candidate in the unsuccessful 2021 California gubernatorial recall election, placing 5th with a total of 4.4% of the vote.

== Early life ==
Born John Kaplan in Chicago on July 15, 1955, Cox is the son of Priscilla (Pick) and Albert Kaplan. He has an older half brother, Michael, from his mother's first marriage. Following her divorce from his biological father, his mother married Thomas Cox, a post office supervisor, who adopted him and moved the family to the Chicago suburb of Alsip, Illinois. Cox graduated from Harold L. Richards High School in Oak Lawn, Illinois. He put himself through college by teaching tennis and earned his B.A. degree from the University of Illinois at Chicago, where he majored in accounting and political science. He received his J.D. degree from the Illinois Institute of Technology's Chicago-Kent College of Law at night while working days at Coopers & Lybrand as an accountant. He and his first wife, Nancy, divorced. He married his second wife, Sarah. Cox was raised by a Jewish mother. He now practices Catholicism with his family.

== Business career ==
In 1981, he founded a law firm specializing in corporate law and tax planning, John H. Cox and Associates. In 1985, he founded Cox Financial Group Ltd., which specializes in investment counseling, income tax planning, retirement planning, and asset protection. Although Cox takes credit for the financial turnaround of the Japp family Chicago potato-chip firm, its owners sued Cox in 1998, alleging financial misconduct, a case that was settled on August 24, 1999 when Cox purchased from the plaintiffs real estate interests he considered worth $3 million for $1.7 million—from his viewpoint, a favorable settlement).

== Political career ==
=== Illinois ===
Originally a Democrat, Cox ran unsuccessfully to be elected as a delegate to the 1976 Democratic National Convention. Cox became a Republican later on, serving in 1987 on the steering committee of Jack Kemp's campaign for the 1988 Republican presidential primaries.

In 2000, Cox ran for Congress in Illinois's 10th congressional district to replace retiring Congressman John Edward Porter, finishing fifth in the Republican primary race, with 6,339 votes, 10.09%, to former Porter aide Mark Kirk, despite spending half a million dollars on his campaign. In 2002, Cox ran for U.S. Senate in Illinois on a conservative platform, aligning himself with Reagan Republicans. He lost the Republican primary with 23%, placing third behind Jim Durkin and Jim Oberweis.

Cox hosted The Progressive Conservative, a twice-weekly bought-time radio talk show on low-wattage WJJG 1530 AM in Chicago. Featuring guests like Michael Moriarty, its themes included criticism of trial lawyers and creation of a website in March 2003 that nominated public figures (such as Janeane Garofalo, Martin Sheen, and Jacques Chirac) as "Friends of Saddam". In 2004, Cox was appointed president of the Cook County Republican Party. At the 2006 Conservative Political Action Conference (CPAC), Cox debated the issue of capital punishment, siding as an opponent of the death penalty.

In 2004, Cox garnered 29.26% of the vote running against incumbent Democrat Eugene Moore in the election for Cook County Recorder of Deeds. During his campaign, Cox declared that he had decided to run for the office in order to eliminate the position. He argued that the office was an unnecessary duplication of services that had become a "model of waste and corruption". While his stance that the office was unnecessary was not enough to garner him election in 2004, Cook County voters later agreed with this position and, in 2016, voted to eliminate the office and merge its functions with the office of the Cook County Clerk.

=== 2008 presidential campaign ===
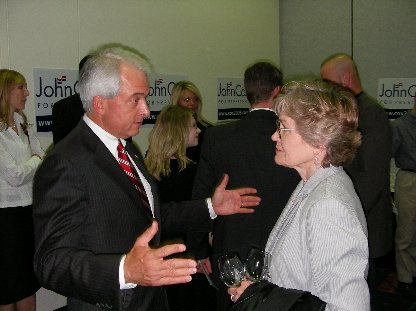
Cox at the 2007 Lincoln Day Dinner in Des Moines, Iowa

On March 9, 2006, Cox announced his candidacy for the Republican nomination for president of the United States in 2008, becoming the first Republican to formally enter the 2008 presidential race. He dropped out of the race later in the year, but did appear on several primary ballots. Cox became a part-time resident of California in 2007, and in 2011 he became a full-time resident of Rancho Santa Fe.

=== California ===
==== Proposed initiatives ====
Cox authored different versions of the Neighborhood Legislature constitutional amendment initiative but failed to qualify it due to lack of signatures for each of the four consecutive general ballots from 2012 to 2018. The final version was called 'The Low-Cost, New Hampshire-Style Neighborhood Legislature Act.' It was inspired by the part-time, 'non-careerist' 400-member New Hampshire Assembly. It would have shrunk each legislator's budget by a third, and imposed a cap on their salaries.

In 2016, Cox proposed an initiative statute that would require legislators to wear the logos of their top 10 donors on their suits when advocating for policies on the Senate or Assembly floor, much like NASCAR drivers wear sponsors on their race suits. Due to insufficient signatures, it failed to qualify for the general election that year. While the initiative was probably not legal due to a 1940s federal legal finding that politicians could not be forced to reveal or display their donors publicly, the intention was to get the voters to be concerned about who the legislators were beholden to, and, thereby, just like the Neighborhood Legislature measure, reduce the power of special interest money.

==== 2018 gubernatorial election ====
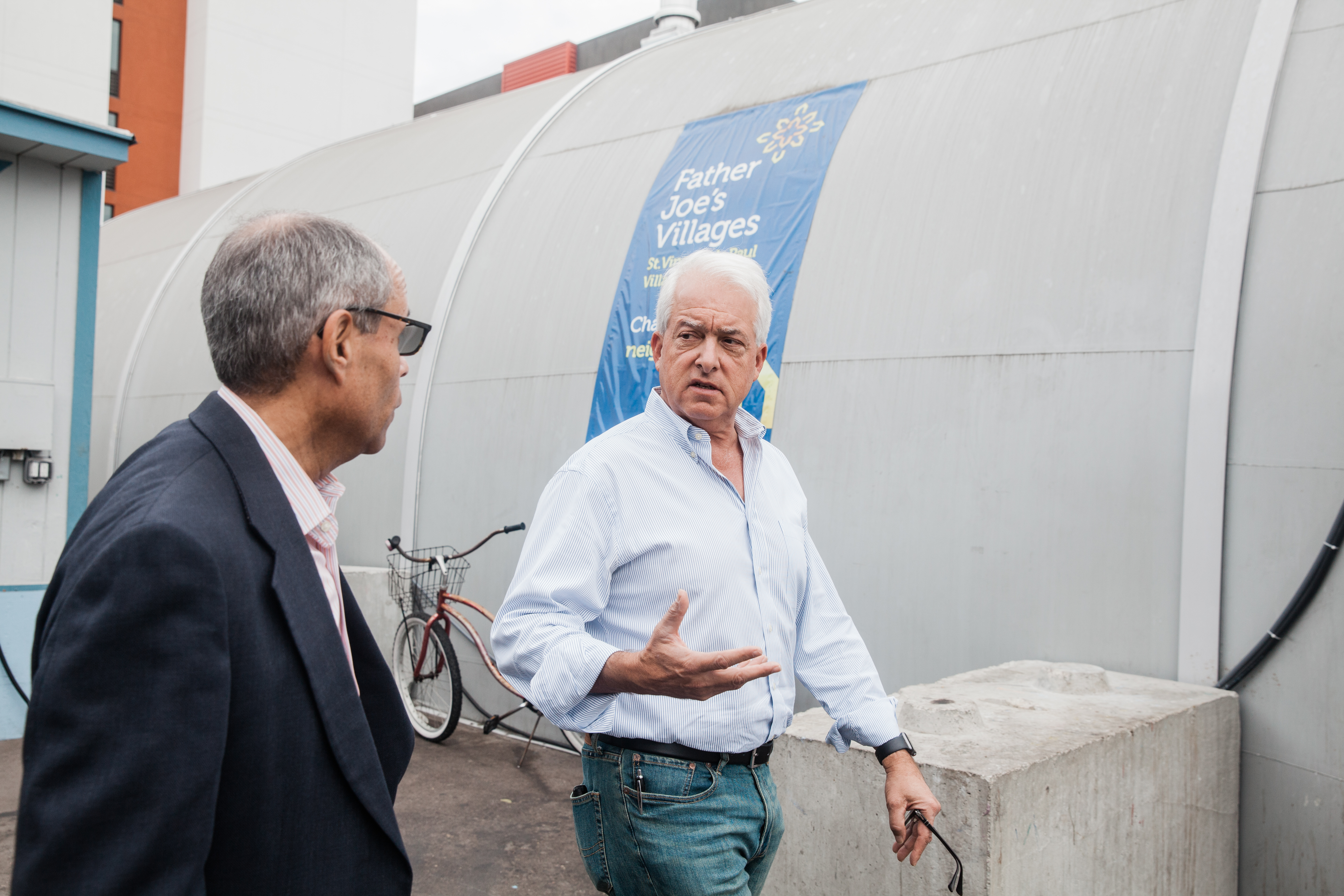
California Gubernatorial Candidate John Cox tours a homeless shelter in San Diego, California.

On March 7, 2017, Cox announced his candidacy for Governor of California in the 2018 election. He garnered the support of 55% of Republican delegates at the spring 2018 California Republican Convention, but fell short of the 60% needed for the party's endorsement. Cox obtained the endorsements of Newt Gingrich and Donald Trump. Cox also received endorsements from eight Republican members of Congress, including House Minority Leader Kevin McCarthy, Devin Nunes, Jeff Denham, and Mimi Walters, as well as by the National Right to Life Committee.

Cox launched his campaign with the slogan "clean out the barn". Cox promised to bring California low taxes, less business regulation, better infrastructure, and repeal of the gas tax. Cox reportedly contributed $4.4 million to his own campaign.

On June 5, 2018, Cox finished second in the top-two nonpartisan blanket primary for Governor of California. In the general election that November, he lost to Democratic nominee and incumbent lieutenant governor Gavin Newsom, who won by roughly 24 points.

==== 2021 gubernatorial recall election ====
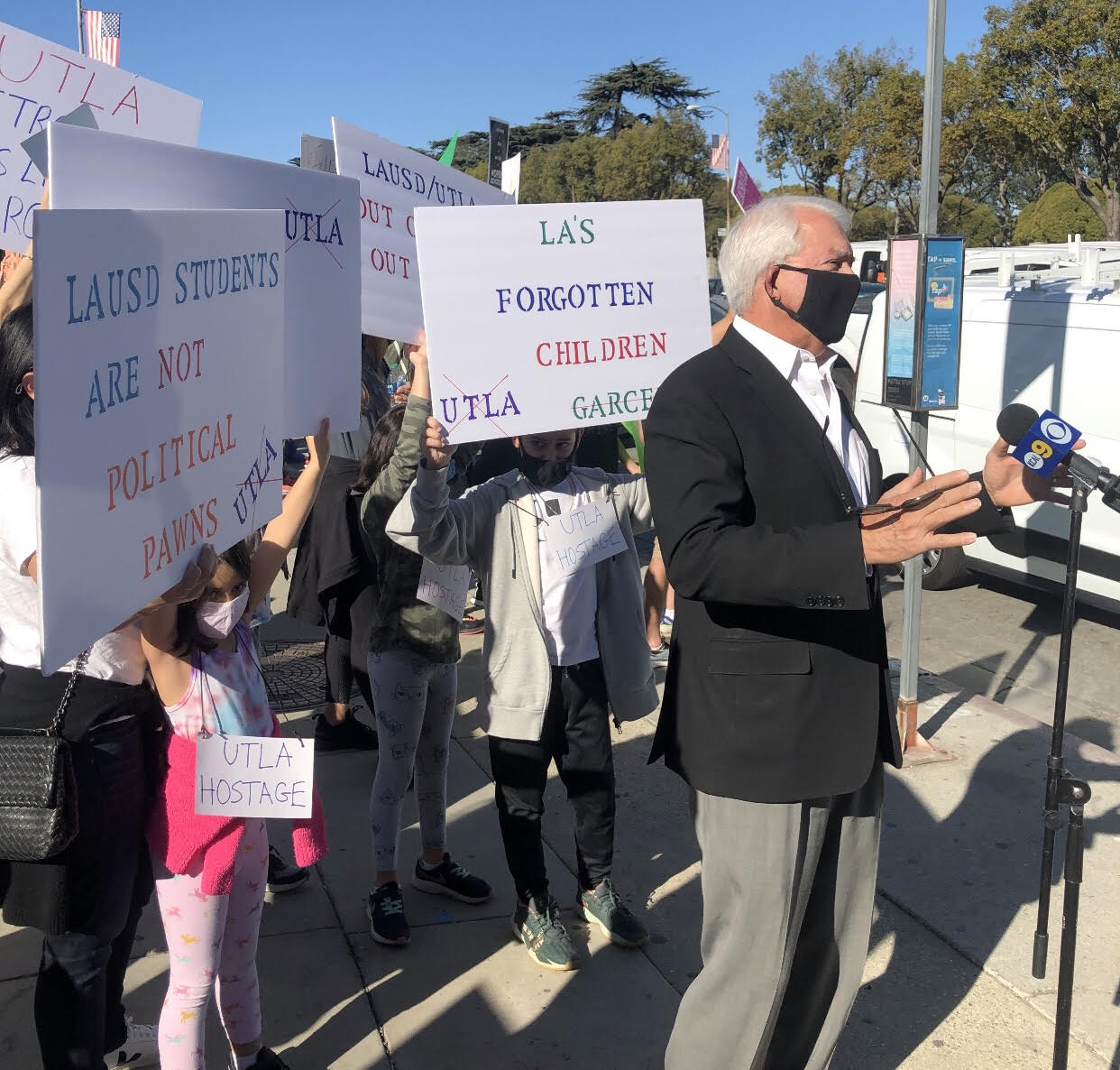
John Cox at 2021 UTLA Protest

In September 2020, Cox launched an exploratory committee for a 2022 gubernatorial run. On February 8, 2021, Cox announced his second run for governor. Ultimately, the opportunity to run again for governor came even earlier, with a recall election in 2021.

With speculation rising of a potential recall election to recall Newsom, Cox donated $50,000 to the California Patriot Coalition in support of the recall of his former opponent. On April 26, 2021, the recall effort was announced to have enough signatures to qualify for a ballot effort. On May 4, 2021, Cox began his campaign in the recall election to replace Newsom as governor, branding himself as "the beast", running against "beauty".

While running again for governor in 2021, Cox was served with a subpoena during a live debate on August 17. The subpoena by a San Diego County court was for an alleged failure to pay a debt of about $100,000 from the 2018 gubernatorial campaign. Cox deemed the case frivolous, and it went away as Cox was not legally liable for any debts to the plaintiff.

== Political positions ==
Cox began his political career as a moderate Democrat, but has become known for his positions as a conservative Republican. Cox holds a consistent life ethic, being strongly opposed to both abortion and the death penalty. He has taken other socially conservative positions, including opposing gay rights and the separation between church and state, while supporting the construction of a border wall. On economic issues, he opposes the gas tax and California's high speed rail proposal.

=== Abortion ===
Although his perspective has evolved, citing the fact that he is a Catholic, Cox has said that he is pro-life.

During the Values Voter presidential debate in 2006, Cox said that he would nominate only judges who are committed to reversing prior court decision where allegedly activist judges "strayed from the judicial role and legislated from the bench."

=== Border wall ===
In January 2018, Cox stated he was opposed to the construction of a border wall. Rival GOP gubernatorial candidate Travis Allen has commented that Cox has "flip-flopped" on his position. Cox has since stated that he supports a southern border wall.

=== Death penalty ===
Cox personally opposes the death penalty on grounds of his Catholic faith and the financial burden associated with the procedure. During his 2018 gubernatorial campaign, a spokesman said that if elected, Cox would have enforced the state's laws permitting capital punishment.

=== Donald Trump ===
Cox did not support Donald Trump during the 2016 United States presidential election, voting for Libertarian Gary Johnson instead. Cox's support for the Libertarian ticket in 2016 and his ambivalence toward President Trump drew criticism from some Republicans as aligning with the Never Trumper movement. By January 2018, Cox characterized his vote for Johnson as "a mistake", but did not indicate who he would have voted for instead. Cox attempted to distance himself from Donald Trump during his gubernatorial campaign; when asked about Trump, he stated to Politico "...no comment. Was that fast enough for you?"

President Trump endorsed John Cox on May 19, 2018, via Twitter stating "California finally deserves a great Governor, one who understands borders, crime and lowering taxes". Advertising from Gavin Newsom's campaign portrayed Cox as Trump's protégé. On May 28, 2018, Trump tweeted a further endorsement of Cox as "...a really good and highly competent man". The president's daughter-in-law, Lara Trump, endorsed Cox in the gubernatorial election as well.

=== Gas tax repeal ===
In 2018, Cox submitted approximately 811,000 signatures in an effort to repeal the 2017 fuel tax increase.

The tax was approved as SB 1 in April 2017 by the Democratic-controlled Legislature and signed into law by Governor Jerry Brown. The tax took effect November 1, 2017, increasing gasoline by 12 cents a gallon and diesel by 20 cents.

=== LGBTQ rights ===
In February 2018, Cox drew criticism for comments he made in 2007 linking gay rights with transvestism, polygamy, and bestiality. He has said that his views have changed and that he is "looking forward to engaging the LGBTQ community and all Californians to revive the California Dream."

=== High-speed rail ===
Cox is against the construction of the California High-Speed Rail project.

=== Marijuana ===
Cox has stated that "I'd like to go to the Portugal system where they actually put people who use marijuana in hospitals and cure them of their substance abuse." He supports medical cannabis.

=== Separation of church and state ===
During a campaign event in 2008, Cox proclaimed: "There is no separation of church and state in the Constitution."

== Electoral history ==
=== Democratic Party Convention delegate ===
Election of delegates to the 1976 Democratic National Convention from Illinois's 3rd congressional district (6 positions)
Candidate for delegate	Individual supported for president	Votes	%
John M. Daley	Adlai Stevenson III	44,472	11.71
Frank Giglio	Adlai Stevenson III	42,585	11.21
Frank D. Savickas	Adlai Stevenson III	42,017	11.06
Jacqualine A. McDonough	Adlai Stevenson III	40,826	10.75
John P. Griffin	Adlai Stevenson III	40,748	10.73
Harry "Bus" Yourell	Adlai Stevenson III	40,719	10.72
Adolph S. Taborski	Dan Walker	13,892	3.66
Harriet Pacini	Dan Walker	13,497	3.55
John Cox	Dan Walker	11,656	3.07
Raymond H. Johnson	George Wallace	11,186	2.95
Louis D. Cavelle	Dan Walker	11,175	2.94
James R. Stellars	George Wallace	10,345	2.72
James J. Kemp, Jr.	Dan Walker	10,263	2.70
Bernice M. Konfederak	George Wallace	9,974	2.63
Augustine S. Arteaga	George Wallace	9,956	2.62
Doris M. Misdom	George Wallace	9,491	2.50
Leo M. Misdom	George Wallace	8,526	2.24
Algis A. Puras	Dan Walker	8,489	2.24
Total		379,817	100

=== U.S. House ===
2000 Illinois's 10th congressional district election
Party	Candidate	Votes	%
Republican	Mark Steven Kirk	19,717	31.39
Republican	Shawn Margaret Donnelly	9,585	15.26
Republican	Mark William Damisch	9,016	14.36
Republican	Andrew Hochberg	7,480	11.91
Republican	John H. Cox	6,339	10.09
Republican	Scott Phelps	3,712	5.91
Republican	Thomas Frederic "Tom" Lachner	2,555	4.07
Republican	Terry Gladman	2,172	3.46
Republican	James E. Goulka	1,469	2.34
Republican	John F. Guy	397	0.63
Republican	Jon Stewart	363	0.58
Total votes		62,805	100

=== U.S. Senate ===
2002 Illinois U.S. Senate Republican primary
Party	Candidate	Votes	%
Republican	Jim Durkin	378,010	45.81
Republican	Jim Oberweis	259,515	31.45
Republican	John H. Cox	187,706	22.74
Total votes		825,231	100

=== Cook County Recorder of Deeds ===
2004 Cook County Recorder of Deeds Republican primary
Party	Candidate	Votes	%
Republican	John H. Cox	117,731	100
Total votes		117,731	100

2004 Cook County Recorder of Deeds election
Party	Candidate	Votes	%
Democratic	Eugene "Gene" Moore (incumbent)	1,283,762	70.74
Republican	John H. Cox	530,945	29.26
Total votes		1,814,707	100

=== Presidential ===
2008 Republican Party presidential primaries
Candidate	Votes	Delegates	
Candidate	Votes	Hard total	Convention floor vote
John McCain	9,902,797	1,575	2,343
Mitt Romney	4,699,788	271	2
Mike Huckabee	4,276,046	278	0
Ron Paul	1,160,403	35	15
Rudy Giuliani	597,518	0	0
Fred Thompson	292,752	0	0
Alan Keyes	56,280	0	0
Duncan L. Hunter	37,880	0	0
Tom Tancredo	8,602	0	0
John H. Cox	3,351	0	0
Sam Brownback	2,838	0	0
others	65,888	0	0
unpledged/ uncommitted/ uninstructed/ no preference	83,015		0
Totals	20,613,585	2,173	2,173

=== California Governor ===
2018 California gubernatorial non-partisan blanket primary
Party	Candidate	Votes	%
Democratic	Gavin Newsom	2,343,792	33.7
Republican	John H. Cox	1,766,488	25.4
Democratic	Antonio Villaraigosa	926,394	13.3
Republican	Travis Allen	658,798	9.5
Democratic	John Chiang	655,920	9.4
Democratic	Delaine Eastin	234,869	3.4
Democratic	Amanda Renteria	93,446	1.3
Republican	Robert C. Newman II	44,674	0.6
Democratic	Michael Shellenberger	31,692	0.5
Republican	Peter Y. Liu	27,336	0.4
Republican	Yvonne Girard	21,840	0.3
Peace and Freedom	Gloria La Riva	19,075	0.3
Democratic	J. Bribiesca	18,586	0.3
Green	Josh Jones	16,131	0.2
Libertarian	Zoltan Istvan	14,462	0.2
Democratic	Albert Caesar Mezzetti	12,026	0.2
Libertarian	Nickolas Wildstar	11,566	0.2
Democratic	Robert Davidson Griffis	11,103	0.2
Democratic	Akinyemi Agbede	9,380	0.1
Democratic	Thomas Jefferson Cares	8,937	0.1
Green	Christopher N. Carlson	7,302	0.1
Democratic	Klement Tinaj	5,368	0.1
No party preference	Hakan "Hawk" Mikado	5,346	0.1
No party preference	Johnny Wattenburg	4,973	0.1
No party preference	Desmond Silveira	4,633	0.1
No party preference	Shubham Goel	4,020	0.1
No party preference	Jeffrey Edward Taylor	3,973	0.1
Green	Veronika Fimbres (write-in)	62	0.0
No party preference	Arman Soltani (write-in)	32	0.0
No party preference	Peter Crawford Valentino (write-in)	21	0.0
Republican	K. Pearce (write-in)	8	0.0
No party preference	Armando M. Arreola (write-in)	1	0.0
Total votes		6,862,254	100

2018 California gubernatorial election
Party	Candidate	Votes	%
Democratic	Gavin Newsom	7,721,410	61.95
Republican	John H. Cox	4,742,825	38.05
Total votes		12,464,235	100

2021 California gubernatorial recall election
Vote on recall			Votes	Percentage
No			7,944,092	61.88
Yes			4,894,473	38.12
Invalid or blank votes			54,013	4.19
Totals			12,892,578	100
Voter turnout			58.45%	
Rank	Party	Candidate	Votes	Percentage
1	Republican	Larry Elder	3,563,867	48.4
2	Democratic	Kevin Paffrath	706,778	9.6
3	Republican	Kevin Faulconer	590,346	8.0
4	Democratic	Brandon M. Ross	392,029	5.3
6	Republican	John Cox	305,095	4.1
All other candidates			1,803,453	24.50
Total valid votes			7,361,568	100
Invalid or blank votes			5,531,010	42.90
Totals			12,892,578	100
Voter turnout			58.45%	

Party political offices
Preceded by Neel Kashkari	Republican nominee for Governor of California; 2018	Succeeded by Brian Dahle
