= J. Bradley Burzynski =

American politician

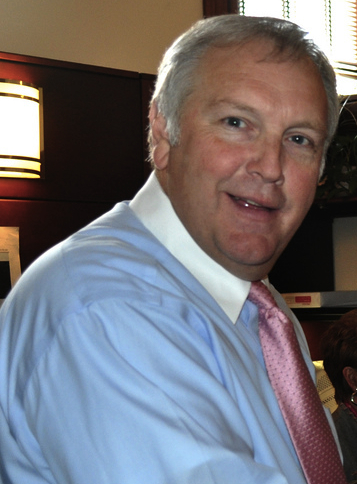

Member of the Illinois Senate from the 35th district
- In office January 1993 – February 2011
- Preceded by: Harlan Rigney
- Succeeded by: Christine J. Johnson

Personal details
- Born: July 13, 1955 (age 71) Christopher, Illinois, U.S.
- Party: Republican
- Spouse: Judy Burzynski
- Education: Illinois Wesleyan University (BME)

J. Bradley Burzynski (born July 13, 1955) is a former Republican member of the Illinois General Assembly serving in the Illinois House of Representatives from 1990 to 1993 and the Illinois Senate from 1993 to 2011.

== Early life, education and career ==
J. Bradley Burzynski was born July 13, 1955, in Christopher, Illinois. He earned a Bachelor's degree from Illinois Wesleyan University. He then taught at Pinckneyville Middle Schools and served as a Farm Bureau manager for Clark and Clinton counties. He then became the director of governmental affairs for the DeKalb County Farm Bureau. Prior to his legislative service, Burzynski was president of the Sycamore School Citizens Advisory Committee, a board member of the DeKalb County Family Services Agency and the secretary of the Sycamore School Parent-Teacher Organization. Burzynski resides in Benton, Illinois with his wife, Judy. They have two adult children and eight grandchildren.

== Legislative tenure ==
In 1990, Representative John Countryman, of the 76th district, chose to run for a judgeship on the Illinois Circuit Court. Burzynski won the Republican nomination and defeated Democratic candidate and student at Northern Illinois University College of Law Robert Tisch. Burzynski won the 1990 general election and took office on December 7, 1990. The 76th district included all of DeKalb County and portions of LaSalle and Kendall counties.

In the 1992 general election, Burzynski defeated John M. Nelson by a margin of 46,150 to 37,949 to be elected to the Illinois Senate. In 2003, he became a member of Senate Republican leadership with his appointment as Caucus Chair.

He led the effort to expand health care options in rural areas by licensing advanced practice nurses in Illinois. He helped pass legislation establishing separate governing boards for state universities to provide a higher quality of education. He fights to improve the overall quality of education, relieve the property tax burden, and protect Illinois families.

During the 2008 Republican Party presidential primaries, Burzynski worked on behalf of the presidential campaign of former U.S. Senator Fred Thompson as a congressional district chair for Illinois's 16th congressional district.

Burzynski resigned in 2011 and was succeeded by DeKalb County Treasurer Christine J. Johnson.
