= 2002 United States Senate election in Illinois =

- November 5, 2002
- Turnout: 49.50%

Nominee	Dick Durbin	Jim Durkin
Party	Democratic	Republican
Popular vote	2,103,766	1,325,703
Percentage	60.33%	38.02%
- Durbin: 40–50% 50–60% 60–70% 70–80% 80–90% Durkin: 40–50% 50–60% 60–70%
U.S. senator before election
Dick Durbin
Democratic
Elected U.S. Senator
Dick Durbin
Democratic

The 2002 United States Senate election in Illinois was held on November 5, 2002. Incumbent Democratic U.S. Senator Dick Durbin sought re-election to a second term in the United States Senate. Durbin defeated Republican challenger State Representative Jim Durkin in a landslide.

== Background ==
The primaries and general elections coincided with those for House and those for state offices.

For the primary elections, turnout was 24.66%, with 1,743,698 votes cast. For the general election, turnout was 49.50%, with 3,486,851 votes cast.

== Democratic primary ==
=== Candidates ===
- Dick Durbin, incumbent U.S. senator

=== Results ===
Democratic primary results
Party	Candidate	Votes	%
Democratic	Dick Durbin (incumbent)	918,467	100.00%
Total votes		918,467	100.00%

== Republican primary ==
=== Candidates ===
- John H. Cox, businessman
- Jim Durkin, Illinois state representative
- Jim Oberweis, owner of Oberweis Dairy

=== Debate ===
2002 United States Senate election in Illinois Republican primary debate
No.	Date	Host	Moderator	Link	Republican	Republican	Republican
Key: P Participant A Absent N Not invited I Invited W Withdrawn							
Key: P Participant A Absent N Not invited I Invited W Withdrawn					John H. Cox	Jim Durkin	Jim Oberweis
1	Feb. 6, 2002	City Club of Chicago	Paul Green	YouTube	P	P	P

=== Results ===
Republican primary results
Party	Candidate	Votes	%
Republican	Jim Durkin	378,010	45.81%
Republican	Jim Oberweis	259,515	31.45%
Republican	John H. Cox	187,706	22.74%
Total votes		825,231	100.00%

== General election ==
=== Debates ===
- Complete video of debate, October 23, 2002

=== Predictions ===
Source	Ranking	As of
Sabato's Crystal Ball	Safe D	November 4, 2002

=== Polling ===
Poll source	Date(s) administered	Sample size (Note: Key: A – all adults RV – registered voters LV – likely voters V – unclear)	Margin of error	Dick Durbin (D)	Jim Durkin (R)	Steven Burgauer (L)	Other / Undecided
SurveyUSA	October 28–30, 2002	528 (LV)	± 4.3%	56%	37%	3%	4%

=== Results ===
Durbin won re-election to a second term easily, carrying a majority of the state's 102 counties.

United States Senate election in Illinois, 2002
Party	Candidate	Votes	%	±%
Democratic	Dick Durbin (incumbent)	2,103,766	60.33%	+4.25%
Republican	Jim Durkin	1,325,703	38.02%	−2.65%
Libertarian	Steven Burgauer	57,382	1.65%	+0.68%
Majority		778,063	22.31%	+6.90%
Turnout		3,486,851	49.50%	
Democratic hold		Swing		

==== Counties that flipped from Republican to Democratic ====
- Warren (largest city: Monmouth)
- Piatt (largest city: Monticello)
- Winnebago (largest city: Rockford)
- Cumberland (largest city: Neoga)
- DeWitt (largest city: Clinton)
- Kankakee (largest city: Kankakee)
- DeKalb (largest city: DeKalb)
- Fayette (largest city: Vandalia)
- Sangamon (largest city: Springfield)
- Douglas (largest city: Tuscola)
- Edgar (largest city: Paris)
- Jasper (largest city: Newton)
- Scott (largest city: Winchester)
- Logan (largest city: Lincoln)
- Tazewell (largest city: Pekin)
- Menard (largest city: Petersburg)
- Morgan (largest city: Jacksonville)
- Bureau (largest city: Princeton)
- Grundy (largest city: Morris)
- McLean (largest city: Bloomington)
- Marshall (largest city: Henry)
- Will (largest city: Joliet)
- Schuyler (largest city: Rushville)
- Shelby (largest city: Shelbyville)
- Clay (largest city: Flora)

== See also ==
- 2002 United States Senate elections
