= Jim Durkin =

American politician (born 1961)

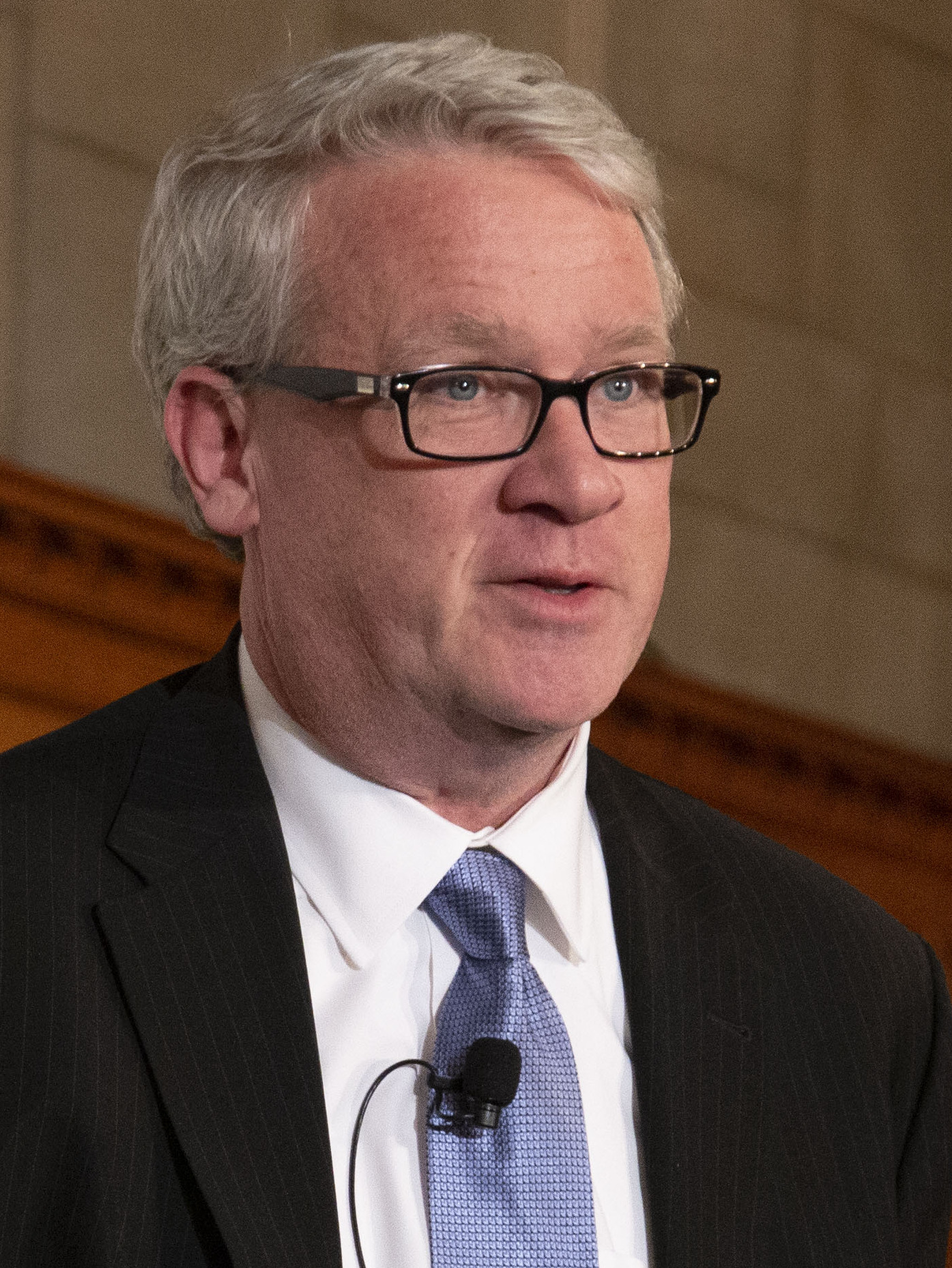
- Durkin in 2019

Minority Leader of the Illinois House of Representatives
- In office August 29, 2013 – January 10, 2023
- Preceded by: Tom Cross
- Succeeded by: Tony McCombie

Member of the Illinois House of Representatives from the 82nd district
- In office January 6, 2006 – January 10, 2023
- Preceded by: Eileen Lyons
- Succeeded by: John Egofske

Member of the Illinois House of Representatives from the 44th district
- In office January 1995 – January 2003
- Preceded by: Thomas Walsh
- Succeeded by: Terry Parke (redistrcted)

Personal details
- Born: James Brian Durkin; January 28, 1961 (age 65) Westchester, Illinois, U.S.
- Party: Republican
- Spouse: Celeste Durkin
- Children: 1 daughter, 3 stepdaughters
- Relatives: Thomas M. Durkin (brother)
- Education: Illinois State University (BA); John Marshall Law School, Chicao (JD)

James Brian Durkin (born January 28, 1961) is an American politician who served as a Republican member of the Illinois House of Representatives from 1995 to 2003 and again from 2006 to 2023. He served as the Minority Leader of the Illinois House of Representatives from 2013 to 2023. He was the Republican nominee for the United States Senate in 2002.

== Early and personal life ==
Durkin was raised in Westchester, Illinois, one of eight brothers. He attended Divine Infant grade school and Fenwick High School. He later attended Illinois State University in Bloomington-Normal and graduated in 1984 with a degree in Criminal Justice. He continued his education at John Marshall Law School in Chicago, where he received his Juris Doctor degree in 1989. He served as an assistant Illinois Attorney General and an assistant Cook County State's Attorney where he served as a felony prosecutor and a special prosecutor in the narcotics unit. His brother, Thomas, is a federal judge on the United States District Court for the Northern District of Illinois. Durkin is on the board of trustees at the John Marshall Law School, and on the board of trustees for Misercordia Home in Chicago. Durkin lives in Western Springs, Illinois, with his wife Celeste, daughter and three step-daughters.

== Illinois House of Representatives ==
In 1991, Durkin was elected to the Board of Trustees for Triton Community College District 504. Durkin was appointed to the Illinois House of Representatives on January 6, 1995, and served until 2002. Durkin was appointed to succeed Thomas J. Walsh after Walsh was appointed to the Illinois Senate to replace Judy Baar Topinka upon her election as Illinois Treasurer.

In 2000, he served as state chairman for U.S. Senator John McCain's presidential campaign in Illinois, and then in 2007, Illinois co-chair and national legislative co-chair for McCain's second presidential campaign.

In the 2001 decennial redistricting, Durkin was drawn into the same district as fellow Republican Bob Biggins and opted not to run for reelection.

Eileen Lyons, a Republican, opted not to run for reelection in the 2006 election. Durkin chose to enter the race to succeed her. Lyons opted to resign from the Illinois House of Representatives midway through the 94th General Assembly effective January 5, 2006. Local Republicans leaders opted to appoint Durkin to the seat.

In 2013, Tom Cross stepped down as House Minority Leader to run for the Republican nomination for Illinois Treasurer in the 2014 election. Durkin's chief opponent for the position, Representative Raymond Poe of Springfield, conceded to Durkin prior to the caucus vote.

After his party lost a number of seats in the 2022 Illinois House of Representatives election, he announced that he would not seek re-election to the leadership post. He was succeeded by Tony McCombie. On January 8, 2023, the Chicago Tribune reported that Durkin would retire from the Illinois House effective January 10, 2023, and not serve in the 103rd General Assembly to which he was elected.

=== Governor Blagojevich impeachment ===
Representative Durkin served as ranking Republican on the Illinois House impeachment committee in December 2008–January 2009. U.S. Senator Roland Burris testified in front of the committee, but his testimony was called into question by a later Burris affidavit, in February 2009. Representative Durkin was then quoted as saying "I can't believe anything that comes out of Mr. Burris at this point," and called for Senator Burris' resignation.

Durkin called for a criminal perjury investigation of Senator Burris, and "scoffed at the notion that Mr. Burris had not been granted time to mention such relevant conversations or that lawmakers had moved on." The news report continued that "Republicans also questioned why it had taken Mr. Burris nearly a month to amend his testimony, and why lawmakers had not heard of the amendments until they were revealed on Saturday in The Chicago Sun-Times — more than a week after he sent them." Democrat Barbara Flynn Currie, chair of the impeachment committee, was the recipient of the follow-up affidavit. Senator Burris filed it February 5 or so with Currie, so she became one of the objects of Republican questions and criticism over the delayed release of the information.

=== Opposition to redistricting ===
Representative Durkin along with other members of the Illinois Republican Party posed strong opposition to the Democratic Drawn Redistricting Maps passed by the State Legislature May 2021. Durkin along with other Senate Minority Leader Dan McConchie criticized the new maps as drawn up too soon arguing that the population assumptions in the new map are off the total population range by up to 29.88%, more than three times the federal maximum range. Durkin along with other State GOP Leaders filed a federal lawsuit challenging the new maps.

== U.S. Senate campaign ==
In 2002, Jim Durkin ran for U.S. Senate against incumbent Dick Durbin. Durkin self-identified as a fiscal conservative and a social moderate. Durkin received the Republican nomination with 46%, or 371,000 votes, defeating multi-millionaires Jim Oberweis and John H. Cox in the primary. He lost to Durbin in the general election, with 38%, or 1,302,000 votes.

== Electoral history ==
Republican primary results
Party	Candidate	Votes	%
Republican	Jim Durkin	378,010	45.81%
Republican	Jim Oberweis	259,515	31.45%
Republican	John H. Cox	187,706	22.74%
Total votes		825,231	100.00%

United States Senate election in Illinois, 2002
Party	Candidate	Votes	%	±%
Democratic	Dick Durbin (incumbent)	2,103,766	60.33%	+4.25%
Republican	Jim Durkin	1,325,703	38.02%	−2.65%
Libertarian	Steven Burgauer	57,382	1.65%	+0.68%
Majority		778,063	22.31%	+6.90%
Turnout		3,486,851	49.50%	
Democratic hold		Swing		

- 2006 Republican primary for State Rep. 82nd District
  - Jim Durkin 78.4%
  - William D. "Bill" Seith 21.6%
- 2006 election for State Rep. 82nd District
  - Jim Durkin (R) 65%
  - Kim Savage (D) 35%

Party political offices
Preceded by Al Salvi	Republican nominee for U.S. Senator from Illinois (Class 2); 2002	Succeeded by Steve Sauerberg
Illinois House of Representatives
Preceded by Tom Cross	Minority Leader of the Illinois House of Representatives; 2013–2023	Succeeded by Tony McCombie
