= Bill Foster (politician) =

American politician (born 1955)

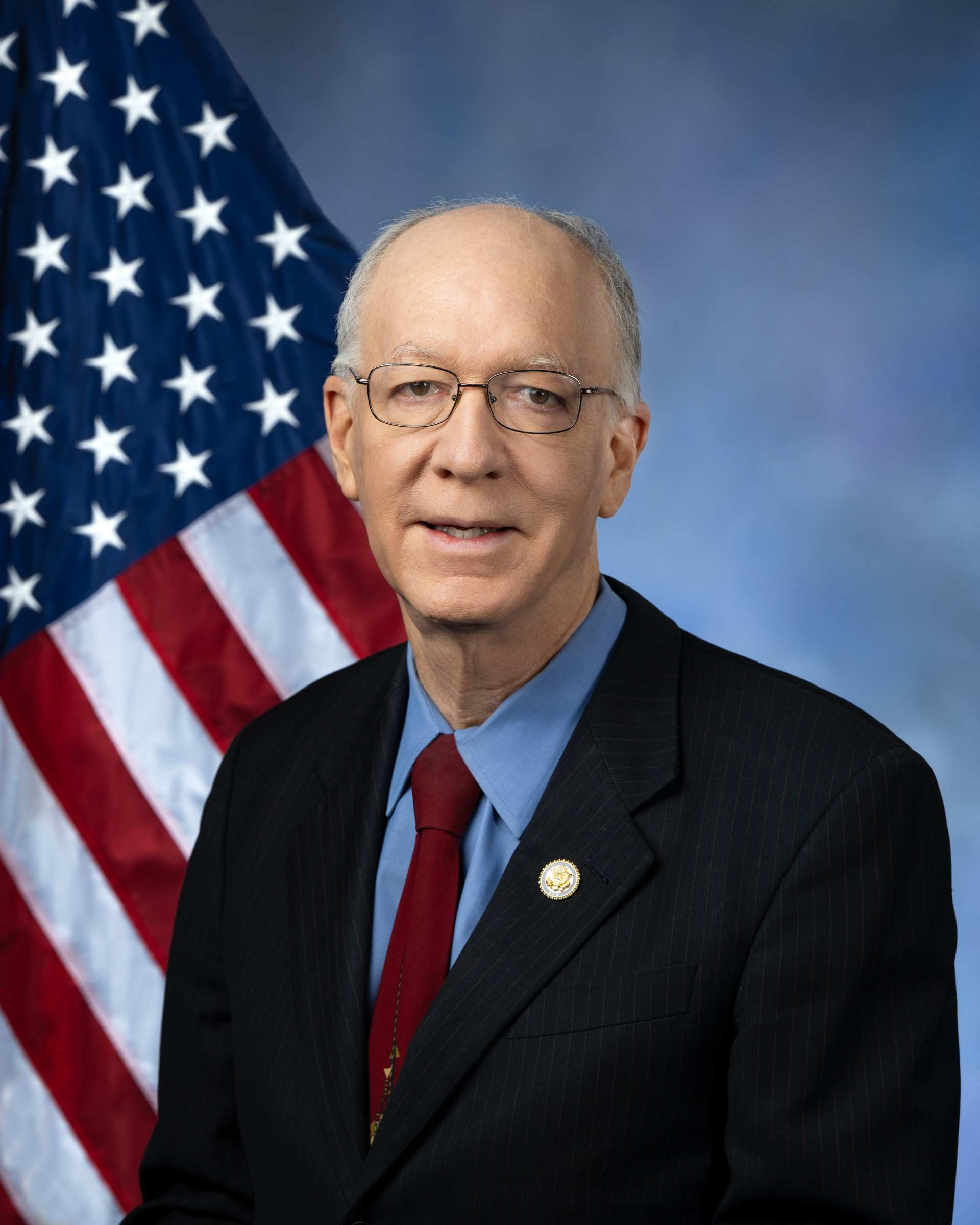
- Official portrait, 2026

Member of the U.S. House of Representatives from Illinois
- Incumbent
- Assumed office January 3, 2013
- Preceded by: Judy Biggert (redistricted)
- Constituency: 11th district
- In office March 8, 2008 – January 3, 2011 (Note: Foster's official service begins on the date of the special election, while he was not sworn in until March 11, 2008.)
- Preceded by: Dennis Hastert
- Succeeded by: Randy Hultgren
- Constituency: 14th district

Personal details
- Born: George William Foster; October 7, 1955 (age 71) Madison, Wisconsin, U.S.
- Party: Democratic
- Spouses: Ann (div. 1996); Aesook Byon (m. 2008)
- Children: 2
- Education: University of Wisconsin, Madison (BS); Harvard University (MS, PhD)
- Website: House website Campaign website
- Scientific career
- Fields: Physics
- Workplaces: Fermilab
- Thesis: An Experimental Limit on Proton Decay: p → e^{+} + Π^{0} (1983)

George William Foster (born October 7, 1955) is an American businessman, physicist, and politician serving as the U.S. representative for Illinois's 11th congressional district since 2013. He was the U.S. representative for Illinois's 14th congressional district from 2008 to 2011. He is a member of the Democratic Party.

== Early life and education ==
Foster was born in 1955 in Madison, Wisconsin. As a teenager, he attended James Madison Memorial High School. He received his Bachelor of Science in physics from the University of Wisconsin–Madison in 1976 and his Ph.D. in physics from Harvard University in 1983. The title of his doctoral dissertation is "An experimental limit on proton decay: $p \rightarrow \mathrm{positron} + \pi^0$."

When Foster was 19, he started a company with his younger brother, Fred. The company, Electronic Theatre Controls, has become a manufacturer of theatrical lighting fixtures and control systems.

== Physics career ==
After completing his Ph.D., Foster moved to the Fox Valley with his family to pursue a career in high-energy (particle) physics at Fermilab, a Department of Energy National Laboratory. During his 22 years at Fermilab, he participated in several projects, including the design of equipment and data analysis software for the CDF Detector, which were used in the discovery of the top quark, and the management of the design and construction of a 3 km Anti-Proton Recycler Ring for the Main Injector.

In 1998, Foster was elected a fellow of the American Physical Society. He was a member of the team that received the 1989 Bruno Rossi Prize for cosmic ray physics for the discovery of the neutrino burst from the supernova SN 1987A. He also received the Institute of Electrical and Electronics Engineers' Particle Accelerator Technology Prize and was awarded an Energy Conservation award from the United States Department of Energy for his application of permanent magnets for Fermilab's accelerators. He and Stephen D. Holmes received the Robert R. Wilson Prize for Achievement in the Physics of Particle Accelerators in 2022 for "leadership in developing the modern accelerator complex at Fermilab, enabling the success of the Tevatron program that supports rich programs in neutrino and precision physics."

== U.S. House of Representatives ==
=== Elections ===
2008 special

On November 26, 2007, former House Republican Speaker J. Dennis Hastert resigned as the Representative from Illinois's 14th congressional district. Foster announced his candidacy to fill the vacancy on May 30, 2007. In the March special election, Foster defeated Republican nominee and Hastert-endorsed candidate Jim Oberweis, 53%–47%.

2008 general

In November, Oberweis ran against Foster again. Foster won reelection to a full term, 58%–42%.

2010

Foster was challenged by Republican nominee State Senator Randy Hultgren and Green Party nominee Daniel Kairis. Despite being endorsed by the Chicago Tribune, the Chicago Sun-Times and The Daily Herald, Foster lost to Hultgren, 51%–45%.

2012

In May 2011, Foster sold his home in Geneva, moved to Naperville and announced plans to run for Congress in the 11th district, which encompasses Aurora, Joliet, Lisle in addition to Naperville. It also includes roughly a quarter of his former district. The district had previously been the 13th, represented by seven-term Republican Judy Biggert. Although Biggert's home in Hinsdale had been shifted to the Chicago-based 5th district, Biggert opted to seek election in the 11th, which contained half of her old territory.

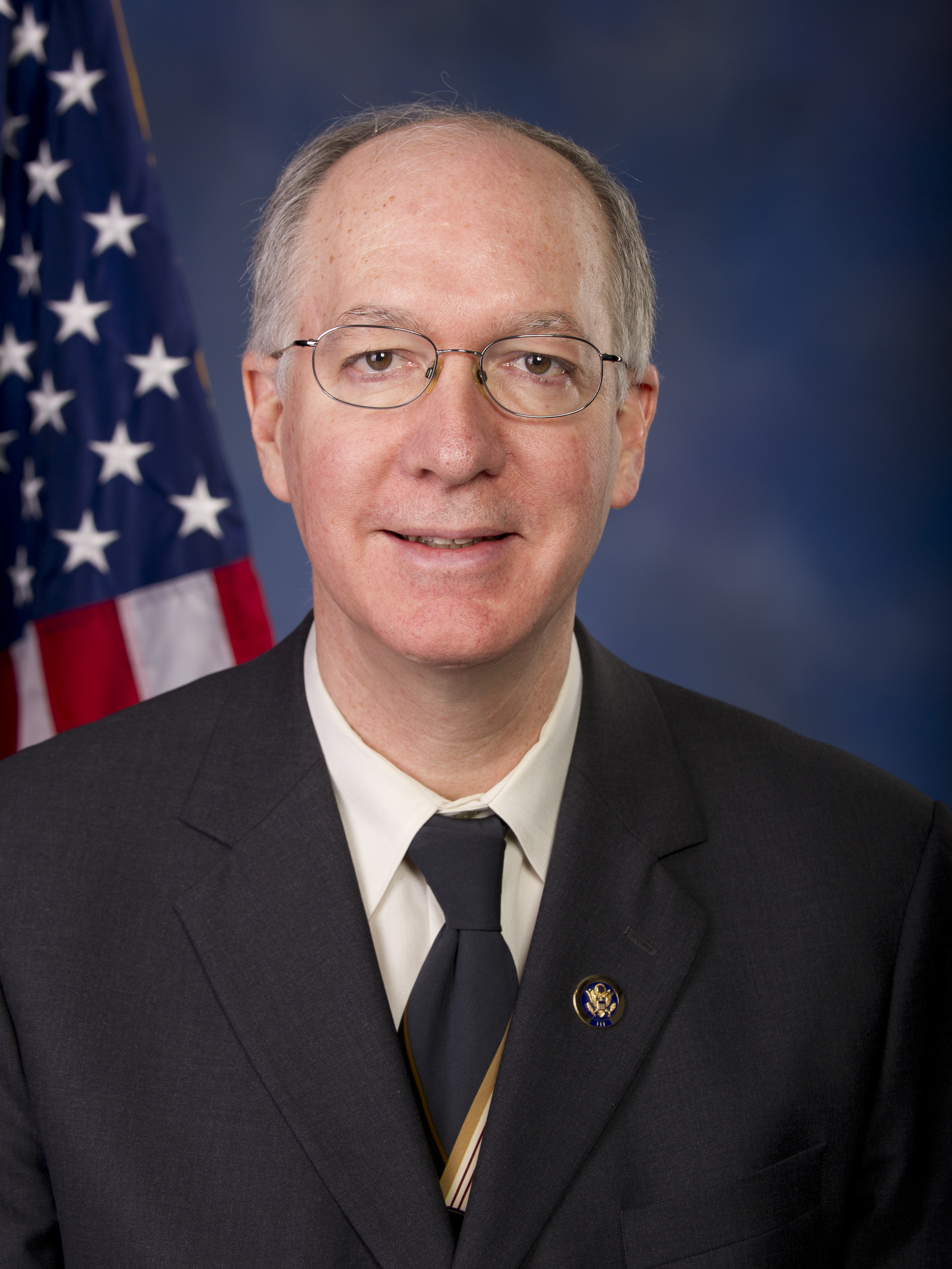
Foster in 2013

On November 6, 2012, Foster won the election for the 11th district with 58% of the vote.

2014

Foster ran again and was unopposed in the Democratic primary. In the general election, he defeated the Republican nominee, State Representative Darlene Senger, with 53.5% of the vote to her 46.5%.

2016

Foster ran again and was unopposed in the Democratic primary. In the general election, he defeated the Republican nominee, Tonia Khouri, with 60.4% of the vote to her 39.6%.

2018

Foster again was unopposed in the Democratic primary. In the general election, he defeated the Republican nominee, Nick Stella, with 63.8% of the vote to Stella's 36.2%.

2020

Foster faced a primary challenge from Rachel Ventura and won the nomination with 58.7% of the vote. In the general election, he defeated Republican nominee, Rick Laib, with 63.3% of the vote.

2022

Foster won the June 28 Democratic primary. In the general election, he defeated Catalina Lauf with 56.45% of the vote.

=== Tenure ===
Although it was initially thought that Foster would not be sworn in until April 2008 due to the need to count absentee ballots before his first election was certified, he took the oath of office on March 11, 2008.

Foster joined Vern Ehlers and Rush Holt Jr. as the only research physicists ever elected to Congress. On his first day in office, he cast the deciding vote to keep from tabling an ethics bill that would create an independent outside panel to investigate ethics complaints against House members.

Fundraising

According to OpenSecrets, Foster received $637,050 from labor-related political action committees during his runs for Congress. $180,000 of this money came from PACs linked to public sector unions. $110,000 of these donations came from PACs linked to industrial labor unions.

According to the Federal Election Commission, Nancy Pelosi gave $4,000 to Foster's 2012 campaign committee. PACs under Pelosi's control donated $10,000 to his 2012 campaign.

=== Committee assignments ===
For the 119th Congress:

- Committee on Financial Services
  - Subcommittee on Digital Assets, Financial Technology, and Artificial Intelligence
  - Subcommittee on Financial Institutions (Ranking Member)
  - Subcommittee on National Security, Illicit Finance, and International Financial Institutions
- Committee on Science, Space, and Technology

=== Caucus memberships ===
- Black Maternal Health Caucus
- Congressional Equality Caucus
- New Democrat Coalition
- Congressional Arts Caucus
- U.S.-Japan Caucus
- Rare Disease Caucus
- Inventions Caucus (Co-Chair)
- Research and Development Caucus (Co-Chair)
- Blockchain Caucus (Co-Chair)
- Payer-State Caucus (Co-Chair)
- National Labs Caucus (Co-Chair)
- Advanced Nuclear Caucus (Co-Chair)
- Heartland Caucus
- Entrepreneurship Caucus
- Spent Nuclear Fuel Solutions Caucus
- Planetary Science Caucus
- Pro-Choice Caucus

== Political positions ==
Foster voted with President Joe Biden's stated position 100% of the time in the 117th Congress, according to a FiveThirtyEight analysis.

=== Taxes ===
Foster supported allowing the Bush tax cuts to expire. During a debate with his opponent in the 2012 election, Foster said, "The tax cuts were promised to generate job growth, but did not. If you follow the money, when you give a dollar to a very wealthy person, they won't typically put it back into the local economy." He said the tax benefits ended up in overseas accounts and spent on luxury purchases.

Foster has opposed efforts to repeal the estate tax. On August 31, 2005, U.S. Newswire reported that Foster said, "The proponents of estate tax repeal are fond of calling it the 'death tax'. It's not a death tax, it's a Rich Kids' tax." In 2009, just before the estate tax was scheduled for a one-year repeal, Foster voted to permanently extend the then current estate tax rate of 45%.

=== Card check ===
According to the official Thomas website, Foster co-sponsored the Employee Free Choice Act of 2009, which would enable unionization of small businesses of less than 50 employees. On February 25, 2012, the Daily Herald reported, "Foster pointed to his support for the Employee Free Choice Act while serving at the congressman in the 14th District as proof of his union support."

=== Stimulus spending ===
Foster voted for the American Recovery and Reinvestment Act of 2009.

=== Health care reform ===
Foster voted for the Affordable Care Act (Obamacare). On June 29, 2012, the Chicago Tribune reported that Foster said of his vote for Obamacare, "I'm proud of my vote, and I would be proud to do it again."

=== Dodd-Frank ===
He also voted for the Dodd–Frank Wall Street Reform and Consumer Protection Act, with all 10 of the amendments he proposed being added to the final bill.

=== Environment ===
He voted against the American Clean Energy and Security Act, which would create a Cap and trade system.

=== Second Amendment ===
Asked if the Second Amendment should be up for reinterpretation, Foster said, "It always has been up for reinterpretation. The technology changes, and the weapons thought to be too dangerous to be in private hands change. A Civil War cannon is frankly much less dangerous than weapons we are allowed to carry on the streets in many of the states and cities in our country today. This is something where technology changes and public attitude changes and both are important in each of the generations."

=== Israel-Palestine ===
Foster voted to provide Israel with support following October 7 attacks. On December 29, 2025, he cosponsored the West Bank Violence Prevention Act of 2025, which opposes Israeli violence in the West Bank.

== Electoral history ==
Illinois 14th Congressional District Special Democratic Primary, 2008
Party	Candidate	Votes	%
Democratic	Bill Foster	32,982	49.60
Democratic	John Laesch	28,433	42.76
Democratic	Jotham Stein	5,082	7.64
Total votes		66,497	100.0

Illinois 14th Congressional District Democratic Primary, 2008
Party	Candidate	Votes	%
Democratic	Bill Foster	32,410	42.47
Democratic	John Laesch	32,012	41.94
Democratic	Joe Serra	6,033	7.90
Democratic	Jotham Stein	5,865	7.68
Total votes		76,320	100.0

Illinois 14th Congressional District Special Election, 2008
Party	Candidate	Votes	%
Democratic	Bill Foster	52,205	52.53
Republican	Jim Oberweis	47,180	47.47
Total votes		99,385	100.0

Illinois 14th Congressional District General Election, 2008
Party	Candidate	Votes	%
Democratic	Bill Foster (incumbent)	185,404	57.75
Republican	Jim Oberweis	135,653	42.25
Total votes		321,057	100.0

Illinois 14th Congressional District Democratic Primary, 2010
Party	Candidate	Votes	%
Democratic	Bill Foster (incumbent)	25,446	100.0
Democratic	Bobby G. Rose	1	0.00
Total votes		25,447	100.0

Illinois 14th Congressional District General Election, 2010
Party	Candidate	Votes	%
Republican	Randall M. "Randy" Hultgren	112,369	51.31
Democratic	Bill Foster (incumbent)	98,645	45.04
Green	Daniel J Kairis	7,949	3.63
Write-in votes	Doug Marks	50	0.02
Total votes		219,013	100.0

Illinois 11th Congressional District Democratic Primary, 2012
Party	Candidate	Votes	%
Democratic	Bill Foster	12,126	58.48
Democratic	Juan Thomas	5,212	25.13
Democratic	Jim Hickey	3,399	16.39
Total votes		20,737	100.0

Illinois 11th Congressional District General Election, 2012
Party	Candidate	Votes	%
Democratic	Bill Foster	148,928	58.57
Republican	Judy Biggert (incumbent)	105,348	41.43
Write-in votes	Chris Michel	19	0.01
Total votes		254,295	100.0

Illinois 11th Congressional District General Election, 2014
Party	Candidate	Votes	%
Democratic	Bill Foster (incumbent)	93,436	53.46
Republican	Darlene Senger	81,335	46.54
Write-in votes	Constant "Connor" Vlakancic	1	0.00
Total votes		174,772	100.0

Illinois 11th Congressional District General Election, 2016
Party	Candidate	Votes	%
Democratic	Bill Foster (incumbent)	166,578	60.45
Republican	Tonia Khouri	108,995	39.55
Total votes		275,573	100.0

Illinois 11th Congressional District General Election, 2018
Party	Candidate	Votes	%
Democratic	Bill Foster (incumbent)	145,407	63.84
Republican	Nick Stella	82,358	36.16
Total votes		227,765	100.0

Illinois 11th Congressional District Democratic Primary, 2020
Party	Candidate	Votes	%
Democratic	Bill Foster (incumbent)	46,116	58.72
Democratic	Rachel Ventura	32,422	41.28
Total votes		78,538	100.0

Illinois 11th Congressional District General Election, 2020
Party	Candidate	Votes	%
Democratic	Bill Foster (incumbent)	194,557	63.30
Republican	Rick Laib	112,807	36.70
Write-in votes	Jon Harlson	13	< 0.01
Total votes		307,377	100.0

Illinois 11th Congressional District General Election, 2022
Party	Candidate	Votes	%
Democratic	Bill Foster (incumbent)	149,172	56.45
Republican	Catalina Lauf	115,069	43.55
Total votes		264,241	100.0

Illinois 11th Congressional District Democratic Primary, 2024
Party	Candidate	Votes	%
Democratic	Bill Foster (incumbent)	35,159	76.58
Democratic	Qasim Rashid	10,754	23.42
Total votes		45,913	100.0

Illinois 11th Congressional District General Election, 2024
Party	Candidate	Votes	%
Democratic	Bill Foster (incumbent)	199,825	55.56
Republican	Jerry Evans	159,630	44.38
Write-in votes	Anna Schiefelbein	229	0.06
Total votes		359,684	100.0

== Personal life ==
Foster and his wife, Aesook Byon, live in Naperville, Illinois. He has two adult children from his first marriage to Ann Foster. When Bill and Ann Foster divorced in the mid-nineties, they remained on good terms and agreed to live within blocks of each other. Their children lived at both of their houses. Foster is a grandparent.

Foster is among the few U.S. representatives not to identify with any religion.

U.S. House of Representatives
Preceded by Dennis Hastert	Member of the U.S. House of Representatives from Illinois's 14th congressional district 2008–2011	Succeeded by Randy Hultgren
Preceded by Adam Kinzinger	Member of the U.S. House of Representatives from Illinois's 11th congressional district 2013–present	Incumbent
U.S. order of precedence (ceremonial)
Preceded by Tim Walberg	United States representatives by seniority 76th	Succeeded by Kweisi Mfume
