= California is not for Sale =

Proposed ballot initiative in California, US

California is not for sale was a proposed ballot initiative that would require legislators to wear the logos of their top 10 donors on their suits when advocating for policies on the Senate or Assembly floor. Due to gathering insufficient signatures, it failed to qualify as a California ballot measure for the 2016 state elections.

The initiative was funded by millionaire John H. Cox, who committed $1 million towards paid signature gatherers. The effort gathered 250,000 signatures but was about 100,000 signatures short of qualifying.
