= 2006 Illinois gubernatorial election =

- November 7, 2006
- Turnout: 47.29% ▼2.76 pp
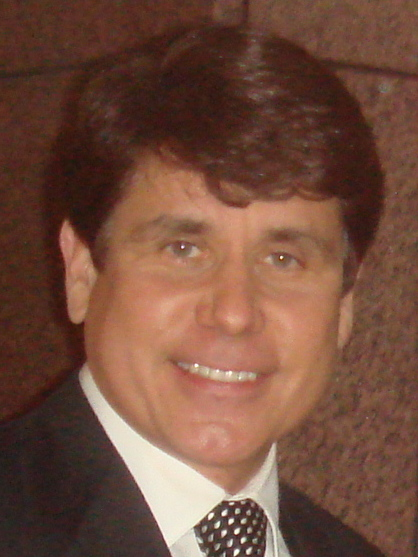

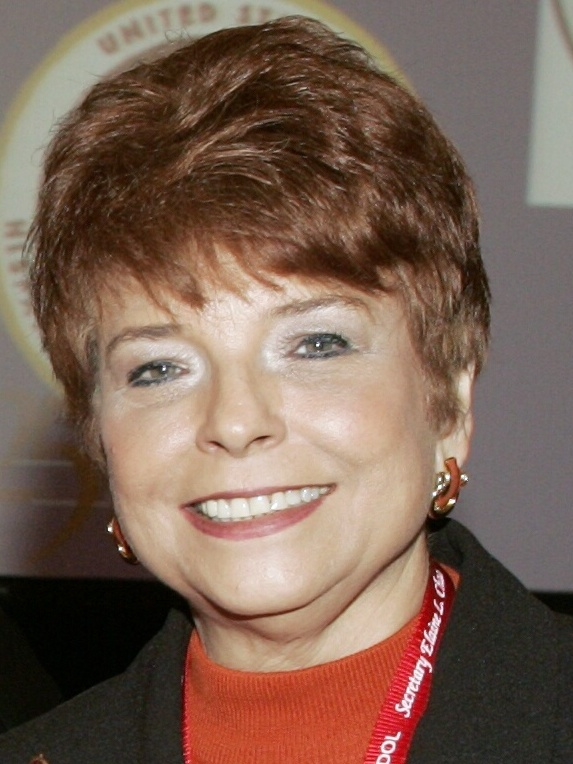

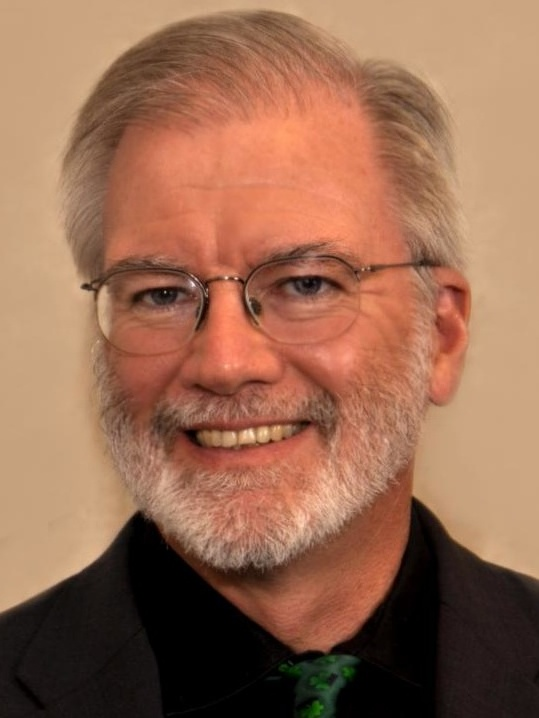
Nominee	Rod Blagojevich	Judy Baar Topinka	Rich Whitney
Party	Democratic	Republican	Green
Running mate	Pat Quinn	Joe Birkett	Julie Samuels
Popular vote	1,736,731	1,369,315	361,336
Percentage	49.79%	39.26%	10.36%
- County results Blagojevich: 30–40% 40–50% 50–60% 60–70% Topinka: 30–40% 40–50% 50–60% 60–70% 70–80%
Governor before election
Rod Blagojevich
Democratic
Elected Governor
Rod Blagojevich
Democratic

The 2006 Illinois gubernatorial election took place on November 7, 2006. Incumbent Democratic Governor Rod Blagojevich won re-election to a second four-year term scheduled to have ended on January 10, 2011. However, Blagojevich did not complete his term, as he was impeached and removed from office in 2009. This was the first election since 1964 that a Democrat was re-elected governor.

Many observers expected the race to be close, especially considering the polling, which had shown Governor Blagojevich to have a high disapproval rating. However, the Republicans had fared poorly due to scandals involving prior Governor George Ryan, and the increasingly unpopular presidency of George W. Bush. Exit polls showed Topinka won white voters (46%–41%-13%), while Blagojevich performed well among African Americans (80%–16%-2%) and Latinos (83%–12%-4%). Democrats won Will County for the first time since 1964, and Lake County for the first time since 1960.

This was the second and last time in Illinois that a woman was a major party's nominee for governor, the other being 1994.

== Background ==
The primaries and general elections coincided with those for Congress and those for other state offices. The election was part of the 2006 Illinois elections.

For the primaries, turnout for the gubernatorial primaries was 23.13%, with 1,680,207 votes cast and turnout for the lieutenant gubernatorial primaries was 20.60% with 1,496,453 votes cast. For the general election, turnout was 47.29%, with 3,487,989 votes cast.

== Democratic primary ==
=== Governor ===
==== Candidates ====
- Rod Blagojevich, incumbent governor of Illinois
- Edwin Eisendrath, former Chicago alderman and former HUD official

==== Results ====
County results Blagojevich: 50–60%; 60–70%; 70–80%; 80–90%; Eisendrath: 50–60%; 60–70%

Democratic gubernatorial primary results
Party	Candidate	Votes	%
Democratic	Rod Blagojevich (incumbent)	669,006	70.84
Democratic	Edwin Eisendrath	275,375	29.16
Total votes		944,397	100.00

=== Lieutenant governor ===
==== Candidates ====
- Pat Quinn, incumbent lieutenant governor of Illinois
- Pamela R. Schadow

==== Results ====
Democratic lieutenant gubernatorial primary results
Party	Candidate	Votes	%
Democratic	Pat Quinn (incumbent)	819,005	100.00
Democratic	Pamela R. Schadow	17	0.00
Total votes		819,022	100.00

== Republican primary ==
=== Governor ===
==== Candidates ====
- Bill Brady, Illinois state Senator
- Ron Gidwitz, businessman and former chairman of the Illinois State Board of Education
- Andy Martin, perennial candidate
- Jim Oberweis, owner of Oberweis Dairy
- Judy Baar Topinka, Illinois state treasurer

==== Declined ====
- Jim Edgar, former governor

==== Campaign ====
On November 7, 2005, Topinka announced that she would not seek re-election as state treasurer — instead, she entered the gubernatorial primary, hoping to challenge Democratic Governor Rod Blagojevich. The Republican primary was deeply divisive; her tenure as party chairman destroyed her support from the conservative wing of her party, and it was feared that her pro-choice and positive gay rights positions would be detrimental to her standing with the same conservatives. In December she announced that she would join forces with DuPage County State's Attorney Joe Birkett as a candidate for lieutenant governor of Illinois.

In February 2006, the candidates for the Republican nomination for Illinois governor began running their first TV ads for the March statewide primary election. Rival candidate Ron Gidwitz's advertisements attacking Topinka were rebuked in the same week by the Illinois Republican Party: "In an unprecedented action, the Illinois Republican Party has officially rebuked the Gidwitz campaign for this ad because the Party found that the ad violates the Party's "Code of Conduct", which was enacted to police proper conduct among Republican candidates."

Later in February, candidate Jim Oberweis, another rival for the Republican gubernatorial nomination, started a series of attack ads for television markets, against Topinka, that were even more widely criticized, mostly for using "fake" headlines on the images of actual Illinois newspapers. These ads, like Gidwitz's ads, also came under review by the Illinois Republican Party. Because of the controversy generated, several television stations withdrew Oberweis's ads.

==== Results ====
County results Baar Topinka: 30–40%; 40–50%; 50–60%; 60–70%; Oberweis: 30–40%; 40–50%; 50–60%; 60–70%; Brady: 30–40%; 40–50%; 50–60%; 60–70%

Republican gubernatorial primary results
Party	Candidate	Votes	%
Republican	Judy Baar Topinka	280,701	38.15
Republican	Jim Oberweis	233,576	31.74
Republican	Bill Brady	135,370	18.40
Republican	Ron Gidwitz	80,068	10.88
Republican	Andy Martin	6,095	0.83
Total votes		735,810	100.00

=== Lieutenant governor ===
==== Candidates ====
- Joe Birkett, DuPage County state's attorney
- Lawrence Bruckner, lawyer
- Jeremy Bryan Cole
- Steve Rauschenberger, member of the Illinois Senate
- Sandy Wegman, Kane County recorder

==== Results ====
County results Birkett: 30–40%; 40–50%; 50–60%; 60–70%; Rauschenberger: 30–40%; 40–50%

Republican lieutenant gubernatorial primary results
Party	Candidate	Votes	%
Republican	Joe Birkett	342,950	50.63
Republican	Steve Rauschenberger	202,905	29.95
Republican	Sandy Wegman	90,255	13.32
Republican	Lawrence L. Bruckner	41,307	6.19
Republican	Jeremy Bryan Cole	14	0.00
Total votes		677,431	100.00

== General election ==
=== Candidates ===
==== On ballot ====
- Rod Blagojevich (Democratic Party), incumbent governor of Illinois
- Judy Baar Topinka (Republican Party), Illinois state treasurer
- Rich Whitney (Green Party), attorney

==== Write-ins ====
The following were write-in candidates.

- Marvin Koch, Chicago-area property manager and naval reservist.
- Mark McCoy (Libertarian Party), legal scholar and rights defender
- Angel Rivera, lung transplant procurement coordinator at the University of Chicago Medical Center
- Mike Shorten

=== Predictions ===
Source	Ranking	As of
The Cook Political Report	Lean D	November 6, 2006
Sabato's Crystal Ball	Lean D	November 6, 2006
Rothenberg Political Report	Likely D	November 2, 2006
Real Clear Politics	Lean D	November 6, 2006

=== Polling ===
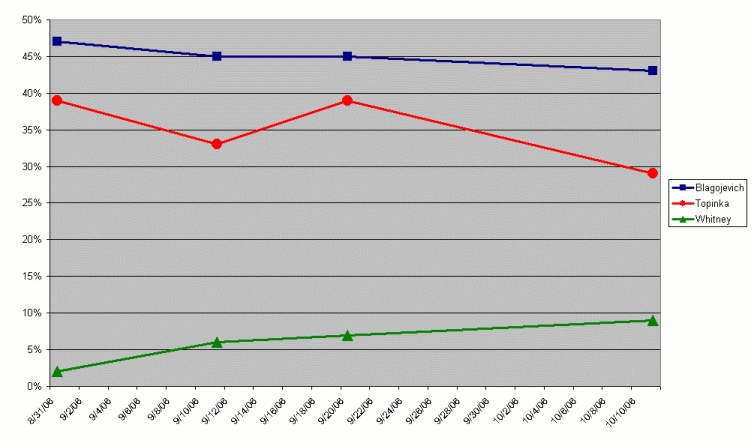
Polling on 14 October 2006

Source	Date	Rod Blagojevich (D)	Judy Baar Topinka (R)	Rich Whitney (G)	Other
Survey USA	November 2, 2006	45%	37%	14%	4%
Survey USA	October 23, 2006	44%	34%	14%	8%
Rasmussen	October 19, 2006	44%	36%	9%	11%
Zogby/WSJ	October 16, 2006	47.1%	33.2%	11.3%	8.4%
Glengariff Group	October 15, 2006	39%	30%	9%	22%
Tribune/WGN-TV	October 11, 2006	43%	29%	9%	19%
Survey USA	September 20, 2006	45%	39%	7%	9%
Rasmussen	September 13, 2006	48%	36%	–	16%
Sun-Times/NBC5	September 12, 2006	56%	26%	3%	15%
Tribune/WGN-TV	September 11, 2006	45%	33%	6%	16%
Zogby/WSJ	September 11, 2006	46.5%	33.6%	–	19.9%
Research 2000	August 31, 2006	47%	39%	2%	12%
Zogby/WSJ	August 28, 2006	44.8%	37.6%	–	17.6%
Rasmussen	August 10, 2006	45%	37%	–	18%
Survey USA	July 25, 2006	45%	34%	–	21%
Zogby/WSJ	July 24, 2006	44.4%	36.4%	–	19.2%
Rasmussen	July 13, 2006	45%	34%	–	21%
Zogby/WSJ	June 21, 2006	41.1%	37.5%	–	21.4%
Glengariff Group	June 1–3, 2006	41%	34%	–	25%
Survey USA	May 23, 2006	43%	37%	–	20%
Rasmussen	April 24, 2006	38%	44%	–	18%
Rasmussen	March 31, 2006	41%	43%	–	16%
Rasmussen	February 25, 2006	42%	36%	–	22%
Rasmussen	February 7, 2006	37%	48%	–	15%
Research 2000	January 22, 2006	45%	37%	–	18%

=== Results ===
2006 Illinois gubernatorial election
Party	Candidate	Votes	%	±%
Democratic	Rod Blagojevich (incumbent)	1,736,731	49.79%	−2.40%
Republican	Judy Baar Topinka	1,369,315	39.26%	−5.81%
Green	Rich Whitney	361,336	10.36%	n/a
Write-in		20,607	0.59%	n/a
Total votes		3,487,989	100.00%	n/a
Democratic hold				

==== Counties that flipped from Republican to Democratic ====
- Will (largest city: Joliet)
- Williamson (largest city: Marion)
- Boone (largest city: Belvidere)
- Mercer (largest city: Aledo)
- Monroe (largest city: Waterloo)
- Henderson (largest village: Oquawka)
- Knox (largest city: Galesburg)
- Lake (largest city: Waukegan)

==== Counties that flipped from Democratic to Republican ====
- Jackson (largest city: Carbondale)
- Cass (largest city: Beardstown)
- Christian (largest city: Taylorville)
- Clinton (largest city: Breese)
- Marion (largest city: Centralia)
- Mason (largest city: Havana)
- Greene (largest city: Carrollton)
- Macoupin (largest city: Carlinville)
- Macon (largest city: Decatur)
- Montgomery (largest city: Litchfield)
- Crawford (largest city: Robinson)

== Aftermath ==
The Green Party became an established political party statewide, according to Illinois state election law, when Rich Whitney received more than 5% of the total vote for governor. The new status provided the party with several new advantages, such as lower signature requirements for ballot access, primary elections, free access to additional voter data, the ability to elect precinct committeemen, run a partial slate of candidates at any jurisdictional level, and slate candidates without petitioning. The only other statewide established political parties were the Democratic and Republican parties. It is rare for a new political party to become established statewide in Illinois, the last to do so being the Solidarity Party in 1986 and the Progressive Party before that.

== See also ==
- 2006 Illinois elections
- 2006 United States gubernatorial elections
- 2006 United States House of Representatives elections in Illinois
