= Forest Etheredge =

American educator and politician

Forest D. Etheredge (October 21, 1929 – June 26, 2004) was an American educator and politician who served as a Republican member of the Illinois Senate from 1981 to 1993.

== Biography ==
Etheredge was born in Dallas, Texas. He moved with his family to Chicago, Illinois. Etheredge graduated from Sullivan High School. He received his bachelor's degree in geology from Virginia Tech. Etheredge received his master's degree from University of Illinois and his doctorate from Loyola University Chicago. He also studied at Northwestern University. In 1965, he left his position at City Colleges of Chicago to establish Rock Valley College. He would go on to be the first president of McHenry County College and then a president at Waubonsee Community College. In 1980, Etheridge defeated incumbent Robert Mitchler in the Republican primary. Etheridge served in the Illinois Senate from 1981 to 1993. Etheredge chose not to run for reelection in the 1992 election. Republican Chris Lauzen, an accountant and member of the Kane County Building Commission, was elected to succeed Etheredge. After his retirement from the Illinois Senate, Etheredge taught at Aurora University. Etheredge died from cancer at his home in Aurora, Illinois.
