= Jim Oberweis =

American politician

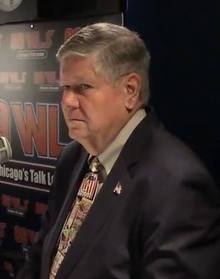
- Oberweis in 2014

Member of the Illinois Senate from the 25th district
- In office January 9, 2013 – January 13, 2021
- Preceded by: Chris Lauzen
- Succeeded by: Karina Villa

Personal details
- Born: June 10, 1946 (age 80) Aurora, Illinois, U.S.
- Party: Republican
- Spouses: Elaine (div. 2003); Julie (m. 2008)
- Children: 5
- Education: University of Illinois, Urbana-Champaign (BA); University of Chicago (MBA)

James D. Oberweis (born June 10, 1946) is an American businessman, investment manager, and politician from the state of Illinois. The former owner of Oberweis Dairy in North Aurora near Chicago, he served as a member of the Illinois Senate, representing the 25th district from 2013 to 2021.

Oberweis has been active in Republican politics for more than two decades and has sought several statewide and federal offices. He was a candidate for the Republican nomination for the United States Senate in 2002 and 2004, and for Governor of Illinois in 2006. He was the Republican nominee for Illinois's 14th congressional district in both a March 2008 special election and the November 2008 general election. In 2012, Oberweis was elected to the Illinois Senate, representing the 25th district. He later became the Republican nominee for the U.S. Senate in 2014, challenging incumbent Senator Dick Durbin. In 2020, he was the Republican nominee for Illinois's 14th congressional district. Following his move to Florida, Oberweis was a candidate for the Republican nomination for the U.S. House seat being vacated by Byron Donalds in the 2026 election in Florida's 19th congressional district.

== Education ==
After graduating from Marmion Academy in Aurora, Illinois, he attended the University of Illinois at Urbana–Champaign, where he joined Phi Kappa Tau fraternity. He spent a year abroad, studying at Technische Hochschule Darmstadt. He received a Bachelor of Arts from Illinois, and then a Master of Business Administration from the University of Chicago.

== Career ==
In 1968, Oberweis became a teacher at Waldo Junior High in Aurora, teaching math and science. In 1970, he changed careers and became an investment stockbroker. Within a few years, he was promoted to manager of a branch office.

In 1976, he began publication of an investment newsletter, the Oberweis Report, which reported on emerging growth companies. The Report was rated highly among investment advice newsletters. In 1978, Oberweis and his first wife, Elaine, established their own investment management company, Oberweis Securities in Aurora, Illinois.

In 1986, Oberweis purchased and assumed control of family business Oberweis Dairy. His father, Joe, had died in 1984, and Joe's successor (and Jim's older brother) John suffered an incapacitating stroke in 1986; after Jim's purchase he turned day-to-day operations over to outside presidents who embarked on acquisition programs highly leveraged with debt. Elaine Oberweis (University of Chicago MBA '89) left the brokerage business in 1989 to rescue the dairy business from near-ruin.

He remained active in the investment field. In 1987, he founded Oberweis Emerging Growth Fund. In 1989, he established Oberweis Asset Management (OAM). OAM specializes in "small-cap growth equities investing", and has individual accounts for institutional investors and a family of mutual funds for individual investors. As of 2015, OAM had about $2 billion under management.

Oberweis moved the Oberweis Dairy from Aurora to its present location in North Aurora. He also began a chain of company-owned dairy stores, and has maintained a dairy delivery business to homes in the Chicago area. A franchise program began in 2004, to expand the dairy business outside of northeast Illinois.

== Television ==
Oberweis became a financial news anchor and host of the show Catching Winners Early on the Financial News Network. In Chicago, Oberweis became a regular guest on the Ask an Expert show. Oberweis was also a popular guest on CNBC, CNN, and Bloomberg TV.

== Political activity ==
Oberweis has sought elective office seven times, succeeding in the 2012 race for the 25th State Senate district seat. His record of unsuccessful election campaigns earned him the nickname of "the Milk Dud".

=== 2002 U.S. Senate election ===
In 2002, Oberweis sought the Republican nomination for U.S. Senator, but lost in the primary, finishing second of three with 31%.

=== 2004 U.S. Senate election ===
Oberweis ran for Senator again in 2004, but again lost in the primary, finishing second of seven with 24%.

Soon after the primary, the winner, Jack Ryan withdrew due to personal scandal. Some Republicans felt that as the second-place finisher, Oberweis should replace Ryan, but the state central committee chose Alan Keyes instead. Keyes lost to Barack Obama by the largest margin for the Illinois U.S. Senate race in history.

Oberweis's 2004 campaign was notable for a television commercial in which he flew in a helicopter over Chicago's Soldier Field and claimed enough illegal immigrants came into America in a week (10,000 a day) to fill the stadium's 61,500 seats.

During his 2004 Senate campaign, Oberweis appeared in television commercials for Oberweis Dairies. The Federal Election Commission ruled that this was an improper corporate contribution to the campaign, and fined Oberweis $21,000 for violation of campaign finance law.

=== 2006 gubernatorial election ===
In 2006, Oberweis sought the Republican nomination for Governor of Illinois. He started his campaign in April 2005. He lost in the primary, finishing second of five with 32%. As part of his campaign, he supported amending the Illinois Constitution to define marriage as opposite-sex only. The winner of the primary was Judy Baar Topinka, who was defeated by Democrat Rod Blagojevich in the general election 49.8%–39.3%, with Rich Whitney, the Green Party candidate, receiving a little over 10.3%.

=== 2008 congressional elections ===
When U.S. Representative Dennis Hastert resigned his seat (Illinois's 14th congressional district) on November 26, 2007, Oberweis ran to replace him. Oberweis was endorsed by Hastert. He won the primary for the special election for the remainder of Hastert's unfinished term with 56%. He also won the primary for the general election for the next term, with 58%.

However, Oberweis lost the March special election to Democrat Bill Foster, getting 47% of the vote to Foster's 53%. He lost to Foster again in November, 58% to 42%.

=== Illinois Republican Party State Central Committee ===
During the elections for the State Central Committee in March 2010, Jim Oberweis ran and won a seat on the Illinois Republican Party's State Central Committee representing the 14th Congressional District. In 2013, as State Central Committeeman, Oberweis led the effort to oust former Illinois Republican Party Chairman Pat Brady after his controversial public support of same-sex marriage. While Oberweis's efforts were unsuccessful, Brady eventually resigned because of the controversy.

Oberweis did not run again for the State Central Committee for the election in April 2014.

=== State senate ===
In the 2012 general election, Oberweis won the 25th State Senate seat previously held by Chris Lauzen, his former GOP primary rival in the 2008 congressional race. He had announced his bid in September 2011. He defeated his Democratic opponent, Corinne Pierog, 57.5%–42.5%. In the 2016 general election, Oberweis again defeated Pierog, this time 54.7%–45.3%.

In October 2018, Oberweis was appointed as the Senate Republican Whip. He did not run for re-election in 2020.

==== Committee assignments ====
- Commerce and Economic Development
- Environment and Conservation (Minority Spokesperson)
- Executive
  - Subcommittee on Election Law
- Labor (Minority Spokesperson)
- Revenue
- Transportation; Subcommittee on Election Law
  - Subcommittee on Capital

=== 2014 U.S. Senate election ===
Oberweis was the Republican nominee for the 2014 Senate election, for the seat held by Democrat Dick Durbin. He defeated Doug Truax in the Republican primary with 56% of the vote. He was defeated by Durbin in the November election.

=== 2020 congressional elections ===
Oberweis announced he would run again for Illinois's 14th congressional district, challenging Democratic incumbent Lauren Underwood. On March 17, 2020, he won the Republican nomination, narrowly defeating six other candidates including fellow state Senator Sue Rezin, and businesswoman Catalina Lauf.

On November 4, Oberweis, leading by less than 900 votes in the incomplete vote count, declared himself the victor. This came despite the fact that the race had not been called by media outlets and there were still thousands of uncounted mail-in ballots. That same day, Oberweis began sending out fundraising appeals to fund fees associated with a potential recount.

On November 12, the race was called by the Associated Press for Underwood. Oberweis did not concede, and stated that he was considering all legal options, including a possible recount.

Jim Oberweis attended the congressional new member orientation on November 13. He began calling for a "discovery recount" on November 18.

According to the official canvass by the Illinois State Board of Elections, Lauren Underwood received 203,209 votes (50.67 percent) and Jim Oberweis received 197,835 votes (49.33 percent).

In January 2021, Oberweis filed a notice of contest with the U.S. House of Representatives, alleging that irregularities in the vote recount would make him the winner of the election. On May 12, 2021, the House rejected Oberweis's challenge.

=== 2026 congressional election ===
In 2020, Oberweis moved from Sugar Grove, Illinois, to Bonita Springs, Florida. In March 2025 he became the first Republican to announce their congressional campaign to replace Byron Donalds in the 2026 election in Florida's 19th congressional district, which includes Cape Coral, in the southeast part of the state. Jim Schwartzel, a media executive, won the August 18, 2026 Republican primary, beating nine other candidaes. Catalina Lauf, who had been endorsed by President Trump, came in second, and Oberweis was third, with almost 16% of the votes cast.

== Electoral history ==
Electoral History – Summary
Year	Office	Election type	Result
2002	U.S. Senate	Primary	Lost
2004	U.S. Senate	Primary	Lost
2006	Illinois Governor	Primary	Lost
2008 *	U.S. House of Representatives	General	Lost
2008	U.S. House of Representatives	General	Lost
2012	Illinois Senate	General	Won
2014	U.S. Senate	General	Lost
2016	Illinois Senate	General	Won
2020	U.S. House of Representatives	General	Lost
2026	U.S. House of Representatives	Primary	Lost

* Special election

Illinois U.S. Senator (Class II) Republican Primary, 2002
Party	Candidate	Votes	%
Republican	Jim Durkin	378,010	45.81
Republican	James D. Oberweis	259,515	31.45
Republican	John Cox	187,706	22.75
Total votes		825,231	100.0

Illinois U.S. Senator (Class III) Republican Primary, 2004
Party	Candidate	Votes	%
Republican	Jack Ryan	234,791	35.48
Republican	Jim Oberweis	155,794	23.54
Republican	Steven J. Rauschenberger	132,655	20.04
Republican	Andy McKenna	97,238	14.69
Republican	Jonathan C. Wright	17,189	2.60
Republican	John Borling	13,390	2.02
Republican	Norm Hill	5,637	0.85
Republican	Chirinjeev Kathuria	5,110	0.77
Total votes		661,804	100.0

Illinois Governor Republican Primary, 2006
Party	Candidate	Votes	%
Republican	Judy Baar Topinka	280,701	38.15
Republican	Jim Oberweis	233,576	31.74
Republican	Bill Brady	135,370	18.40
Republican	Ron Gidwitz	80,068	10.88
Republican	Andy Martin	6,095	0.83
Total votes		735,810	100.0

Illinois 14th Congressional District Special Republican Primary, 2008
Party	Candidate	Votes	%
Republican	Jim Oberweis	41,980	56.02
Republican	Chris Lauzen	32,955	43.98
Total votes		74,935	100.0

Illinois 14th Congressional District Republican Primary, 2008
Party	Candidate	Votes	%
Republican	Jim Oberweis	44,462	56.36
Republican	Chris Lauzen	32,584	41.30
Republican	Michael J. Dilger	1,847	2.34
Total votes		78,893	100.0

Illinois 14th Congressional District Special Election, 2008
Party	Candidate	Votes	%
Democratic	Bill Foster	52,205	52.53
Republican	Jim Oberweis	47,180	47.47
Total votes		99,385	100.0

Illinois 14th Congressional District General Election, 2008
Party	Candidate	Votes	%
Democratic	Bill Foster (incumbent)	185,404	57.75
Republican	Jim Oberweis	135,653	42.25
Total votes		321,057	100.0

Illinois 25th State Senate District Republican Primary, 2012
Party	Candidate	Votes	%
Republican	Jim Oberweis	10,871	49.34
Republican	Dave Richmond	6,629	30.09
Republican	Richard C. Slocum	4,532	20.57
Total votes		22,032	100.0

Illinois 25th State Senate District General Election, 2012
Party	Candidate	Votes	%
Republican	Jim Oberweis	51,527	57.52
Democratic	Corinne M. Pierog	38,061	42.48
Total votes		89,588	100.0

Illinois U.S. Senator (Class II) Republican Primary, 2014
Party	Candidate	Votes	%
Republican	James D. "Jim" Oberweis	423,097	56.08
Republican	Douglas Lee Truax	331,237	43.91
Republican	Sherry Procarione (write-in)	54	0.01
Total votes		754,388	100.0

Illinois U.S. Senator (Class II) General Election, 2014
Party	Candidate	Votes	%
Democratic	Richard J. Durbin (incumbent)	1,929,637	53.55
Republican	James D. "Jim" Oberweis	1,538,522	42.69
Libertarian	Sharon Hansen	135,316	3.76
Write-in votes	Roger K. Davis	31	0.00
Write-in votes	Hilaire F. Shioura	12	0.00
Write-in votes	Sherry Procarione	1	0.00
Total votes		3,603,519	100.0

Illinois 25th State Senate District General Election, 2016
Party	Candidate	Votes	%
Republican	Jim Oberweis (incumbent)	54,636	54.66
Democratic	Corinne M. Pierog	45,317	45.34
Total votes		99,953	100.0

Illinois 14th Congressional District Republican Primary, 2020
Party	Candidate	Votes	%
Republican	Jim Oberweis	13,187	25.61
Republican	Sue Rezin	11,720	22.76
Republican	Catalina Lauf	10,365	20.13
Republican	Ted Gradel	6,864	13.33
Republican	Jim Marter	5,666	11.00
Republican	Jerry Evans	2,576	5.00
Republican	Anthony Catella	1,109	2.15
Total votes		51,487	100.0

Illinois 14th Congressional District General Election, 2020
Party	Candidate	Votes	%
Democratic	Lauren Underwood (incumbent)	203,209	50.67
Republican	Jim Oberweis	197,835	49.33
Write-in votes	Joseph Monack	8	0.00
Total votes		401,052	100.0

Florida 19th Congressional District Republican Primary, 2026
Party	Candidate	Votes	%
Republican	Jim Schwartzel	26,140	29.1
Republican	Catalina Lauf	19,714	22.0
Republican	Jim Oberweis	14,105	15.7
Republican	Madison Cawthorn	7,592	8.5
Republican	Chris Collins	6,614	7.4
Republican	Mike Pederson	5,578	6.2
Republican	John Strand	3,512	3.9
Republican	Ola Hawatmeh	2,533	2.8
Republican	Greg Bukowski	2,265	2.5
Republican	Linda J. Sawyer	1,648	1.8
Total votes		89,701	100.0

== Personal life ==
Jim Oberweis and his first wife, Elaine, had five children together before divorcing in 2003. He has two stepchildren with his second wife, Julie, and twenty grandchildren.

Oberweis is a Roman Catholic.

Oberweis is an avid chess player. In 2013, he had a USCF rating of 1926 (class A). He supported the Fox Valley Chess Club for many years. He also served as President of the Illinois Chess Association for two years, as Illinois delegate to the USCF, and as a trustee of the American Chess Foundation and the Chess Trust Fund.

Party political offices
Preceded by Steve Sauerberg	Republican nominee for U.S. senator from Illinois (Class 2); 2014	Succeeded by Mark Curran
