= Steve Rauschenberger =

American politician (born 1956)

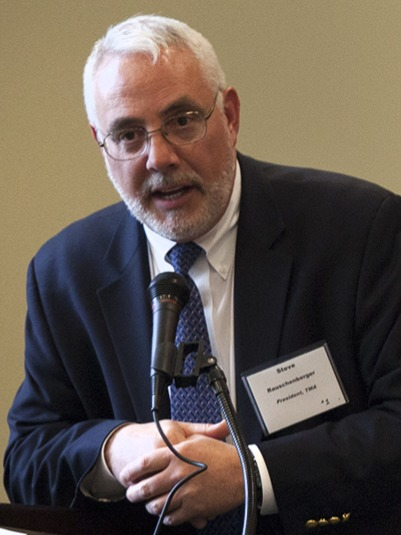
- Rauschenberger speaking at Mayor's Manufacturing Summit in 2015

Member of the Illinois Senate from the 22nd District 33rd District (1993-2003)
- In office January 1993 – January 2007
- Preceded by: John Friedland
- Succeeded by: Michael Noland

President of the National Conference of State Legislatures
- In office 2005–2006
- Preceded by: John Hurson
- Succeeded by: Leticia Van de Putte

Personal details
- Born: August 29, 1956 (age 70) Elgin, Illinois
- Party: Republican
- Spouse: Betty
- Children: Two
- Education: College of William & Mary

Steve Rauschenberger (born August 29, 1956) is an American politician who served as a Republican member of the Illinois State Senate from 1993 to 2007.

== Early life ==
Steve Rauschenberger was born on August 29, 1956, in Elgin as one of six children to John Rauschenberger, a member of the Illinois Republican State Central Committee, and Shirley Rauschenberger. He attended Elgin Area School District U46 public schools and was a National Merit Finalist in high school. In 1978, he earned a bachelor's degree in business administration from College of William & Mary in Virginia. In 1980, he purchased his family's business, Rauschenberger Furniture Co., and went on in 1985 to buy Ackemann Brothers Corp., of which he is currently president and general manager. He became active with his children in Boy Scouts and served as a member of the Elgin Downtown Advisory Commission.

== Illinois Senate ==
=== 1992 Election ===
In 1991, Republican Senator John Friedland chose not to run for re-election in the 33rd district. At that time, the 33rd included Streamwood and Bartlett in Cook County, Elgin, South Elgin, West Dundee, East Dundee, Carpentersville, Maple Park, Hampshire, Burlington, Sugar Grove and Campton Township in Kane County and Hinckley in DeKalb County. Rauschenberger ran for the seat, citing a change in the tax code that cost retailers millions by forcing them to change their accounting practices. In an upset, Rauschenberger defeated State Representative James Kirkland in the March primary. In May, businessman and lawyer Thom McNamee became the Democratic nominee. Rauschenberger ran on a platform of privatization of government services, opposition to tax hikes, an increase in earned income tax credits, opposition to the proposed Fox Valley Freeway and restoring the state's financial health.

=== Tenure ===
During his early years in the Senate, he was a member of a group dubbed the "Fab Five." The group was made up of conservative state senators elected in 1992 who were anti-tax, pro-balanced budget and often challenged the Republican leadership of Senate President Pate Philip and Governor Jim Edgar. The group's other four members were, Peter Fitzgerald, Dave Syverson, Patrick O'Malley and Chris Lauzen. As a result of the group's clout Rauschenberger became chair of the influential Appropriations Committee during his first term. As Chairman of the Appropriations Committee, Senator Rauschenberger negotiated the multibillion-dollar state budget. He also served as the Senate negotiator for KidCare, the state health insurance program for children in low-income, working families.

During the 2001 redistricting process, Rauschenberger was drawn into the 22nd legislative district which included much of his old territory in Elgin, Dundee and Hanover townships and added Schaumburg Township. He won re-election in the new district with 56% of the vote. In 2003, when the Democratic Party took a majority in the Illinois Senate, he lost his chairmanship of the appropriations committee, but was appointed to be an Assistant Republican Leader under Frank Watson. He also served as Minority Spokesman on the Joint Task Force on Immigrants and Refugees

In the Senate, Rauschenberger's legislative agenda including supporting statewide tax caps, increasing the income tax exemption, enacting "pro-life" policies and balancing the budget. He also received high ratings from the Illinois Federation of Independent Business during his tenure.

During his time in the Illinois Senate, Rauschenberger was active with the National Conference of State Legislatures including serving as co-chair of the Taskforce on Telecommunications and Electronic Commerce, an executive board member and Vice President. In 2006, he was elected President of the NCSL. He was also active in the Republican Party serving as the Hanover Township Republican Committeeman from 1994-2002 and as President of the John Ericsson Republican League, a Swedish American Republican organization.

== Runs for Higher Office ==
=== United States Senate election, 2004 ===
In May 2003, Jim Edgar announced that he would not seek the US Senate seat being vacated by retiring US Senator Peter Fitzgerald. Rauschenberger was one of the many people speculated who could run for the seat. On September 23, 2003, Rauschenberger announced his candidacy for the Republican nomination for U.S. Senate. Despite being heavily out matched in fundraising, he rode a late surge fueled by sweeping editorial endorsements, including the Chicago Tribune to finish third in the March 16, 2004 Illinois U.S. Senate Republican primary election that was won by Jack Ryan.

During the general election, Jack Ryan dropped out of the race after revelations regarding his divorce. Subsequently Rauschenberger became a front-runner to replace Ryan as the Republican nominee in Senate race against then-State Senator Barack Obama, including being promoted by Don Manzullo. Rauschenberger announced on July 8, 2004 that he would not seek the Republican nomination for U.S. Senate—in part because he was never convinced he would have the financial support needed to wage a competitive campaign against Barack Obama who had announced two days earlier having raised $4 million in the second quarter of 2004. His withdraw was followed by speculation about a potential Mike Ditka candidacy.

=== Illinois gubernatorial election, 2006 ===
In August 2005, Senator Rauchenberger sought the Republican nomination Governor of Illinois in the 2006 election. However, citing a crowded field, Rauchenberger dropped out of the race for governor and joined Ron Gidwitz's campaign as his running mate for lieutenant governor. Though the two positions are nominated in the primary independently, candidates for both often run together during the primary campaign, promoting a single "ticket." During the race, he vowed to drop out if Judy Baar Topinka won the nomination. He ultimately lost to Topinka's running mate and DuPage County States Attorney Joe Birkett.

== Post political career ==
After leaving the Senate in 2007, he founded Rauschenberger Partners, a lobbying firm where he serves as president. He also took on the role of President of the United Republican Fund until his resignation in 2010. In 2008, he ran to become the Republican National Committeeman representing Illinois, but lost to Pat Brady at the 2008 State Convention of the Illinois Republican Party.

During the 2008 Republican Party presidential primaries, Rauschenberger ran to be a delegate to the 2008 Republican National Convention from Illinois's 14th congressional district for the presidential campaign of former Governor Mitt Romney.

During the 2010 election cycle Rauschenberger chose to run against Mike Noland, his successor as state senator and the Democratic incumbent. He was endorsed by Illinois Citizens for Ethics, Illinois Family Action, Illinois Federation of Independent Business, National Rifle Association, the Chicago Tribune and the United Republican Fund of which he was president. On election night, Noland defeated Rauschenberger by 585 votes.

In May 2015, Rauschenberger became president of the Technology & Manufacturing Association, a nonprofit organization that represents precision manufacturing and supplier companies in Illinois.
