= Christine J. Johnson =

American politician

Christine Johnson

Member of the Illinois Senate from the 35th district
- In office 2011–2013
- Preceded by: J. Bradley Burzynski
- Succeeded by: Dave Syverson

Personal details
- Born: March 12, 1960 (age 66)
- Party: Republican

Christine J. Johnson was Treasurer for DeKalb County, Illinois, first elected to the office in 1994 and continuing until her resignation in December 2020. She was the longest-serving treasurer in the county's history. Johnson is also a former Republican member of the Illinois Senate, where she represented the 35th legislative district in Boone, DeKalb, Ogle, LaSalle and Winnebago counties from 2011 to 2013. Johnson was elected to her 7th term as Treasurer in 2018.

== Early life, education and career ==
Johnson grew up on a farm and was educated in the DeKalb County area. She received a B.A. in Journalism and Public Relations from Northern Illinois University, which is now part of the district she represents.

Prior to serving as Treasurer, Johnson worked as the Shabbona Lake State Park Office Coordinator and assisted with her family farm operations in Shabbona.

== Illinois Senate ==
Johnson serves on the following Senate Committees: Higher Education (on which she is the Minority Spokesperson), Education, Licensed Activities, and Public Health. Johnson was also appointed to the P-20 Council on Education and Advisory Committee on Medicaid.

=== 2012 election ===
Following the 2011 redistricting, parts of Johnson's district were combined fellow Republican district. As a result, she faced a contested primary for the 35th district Republican nomination on March 20, 2012.

== Personal life ==
Residing in Shabbona alongside her husband Jim, Johnson's household includes their adult son. Over the course of her civic career, she has been recognized with numerous awards. In 2003, she was bestowed the Treasurer of the Year Award by the Illinois Country Treasurer Association. Johnson played a pivotal role in co-founding the Indian Creek Education Foundation.
