= Chris Lauzen =

American politician

Kane County Treasurer
- Incumbent
- Assumed office December 2022
- Preceded by: Michael Kilbourne

Chairman of the Kane County Board
- In office December 2012 – December 2020
- Preceded by: Karen McConnaughay
- Succeeded by: Corinne Pierog

Member of the Illinois Senate from the 25th district
- In office January 1993 – January 2013
- Preceded by: Forest Etheredge
- Succeeded by: Jim Oberweis

Personal details
- Born: December 30, 1952 (age 73) Aurora, Illinois, U.S.
- Party: Republican
- Spouse: Sarah Longley
- Children: 4
- Education: Duke University (BS); Harvard University (MBA)
- Profession: Certified Public Accountant
- Website: Official

Christopher John Lauzen is an American politician, businessman, and certified public accountant serving as Kane County Treasurer since 2022. He previously served as chairman of the Kane County Board from 2012 to 2020. He also served as a Republican member of the Illinois State Senate from 1993 to 2013. Lauzen was the Republican nominee for Illinois Comptroller in 1998 and a candidate in the 2008 Illinois's 14th congressional district special election.

== Early life and education ==
Born and raised in Aurora, Illinois, Lauzen earned his Bachelor of Science degree from Duke University in 1974 and a Master of Business Administration from Harvard Business School in 1978.

Lauzen's grandparents emigrated from Romania to the United States in the early 20th century. On July 28, 2006, Romanian President Traian Băsescu awarded Lauzen the Order of the Star of Romania Medal, Commander Rank (the highest commendation granted to a foreign citizen by Romania), in recognition of his work to "build bridges of friendship and commerce between the people of Romania and the United States."

== Career ==
=== Business ===
After receiving his degree, Lauzen returned to Aurora and worked as the president of Comprehensive Accounting Corporation, a franchisor of accounting services. He and his wife, Sarah, later purchased a Comprehensive Accounting franchise in Geneva, IL.

=== Illinois Senate ===
Chris Lauzen was first elected to the Illinois State Senate in 1992. He joined a group of newly elected conservative State Senators called the "Fab Five", including Dave Syverson, Steve Rauschenberger, Patrick O'Malley, and Peter Fitzgerald. Throughout his political career, Lauzen has been a supporter of Christian views of marriage and stands against gun control and is pro-life.

Lauzen served on several committees, including the Property Tax Reform Committee, Appropriations I, II, and III, and the Revenue Committee, where he was the ranking Republican spokesman. In recognition of his work on these committees, Lauzen was honored by the Illinois Chamber of Commerce with the "Champion of Free Enterprise" award and the NFIB with the "Guardian of Small Business" award.

Lauzen sponsored a large tax reduction for employers and a property tax assessment freeze for homeowners over 65 years old with income less than $35,000. He worked to reduce property taxes on VFW and American Legion veterans' posts by 85% and placed a cap on future increases. Lauzen also started "Illinois Porkbusters," which sought to cut $5,000,000 in wasteful spending each year from the state budget.

Lauzen helped secure over $48,000,000 for school construction grants, sponsored education license plates for future teachers' scholarships, and was the only senator to speak against and vote "No" on providing 2/3 tuition discounts to illegal immigrants at public universities.

Lauzen launched a Prescription Medication Pilot Program that saved participants an average of 50% on the cost of prescription medication. He was also the original lead sponsor of the Breast Cancer Research voluntary check-off on the state personal income tax return.

While in the state senate, Lauzen also sponsored a ban on partial birth abortion and supported term limits for State Legislators.

=== 1998 state comptroller campaign ===
In 1998, Lauzen ran for Illinois state comptroller to replace retiring Republican comptroller Loleta Didrickson. He won the Republican primary election by defeating Harry J. Seigle of East Dundee but lost in the general election to Democrat Dan Hynes.

=== 2008 congressional campaign ===
Lauzen officially began his campaign for congress in Illinois's 14th congressional district on September 19, 2007. Lauzen ran to replace Dennis Hastert, who retired mid-term. Lauzen lost the Congressional campaign, receiving 44% of the Republican vote to Jim Oberweis' 56%.

=== Kane County board chairman ===
Lauzen managed the County during the second year of a freeze on the property tax levy for the county, Forest Preserve, and the Fox Valley Park District. In March 2013, he also led members of the Kane County Board to a unanimous decision to refinance a large number of county bonds. Lauzen has been involved in the Longmeadow Parkway Bridge Corridor, a proposed project to build a bridge in northern Kane County over the Fox River.

In 2018, Lauzen raised questions regarding possible insider payments from the executive director of the Upper Illinois Valley River Development Authority to companies he owns. The authority is one of 10 regional development authority bodies in Illinois. Its executive director is Andrew Hamilton and he is the head of 8 of the 10 bodies, including the Upper Illinois Valley agency that includes Kane County. The Illinois Policy Institute (IPI) had published two reports that focus on over $2 million that IPI says has gone to Hamilton and companies he is affiliated with. Lauzen questioned the liaison to the authority but did not receive satisfactory answers, according to him, and called for a closer investigation. According to the Daily Herald, "The institute [IPI] found Hamilton operates a related private business that has resulted in $2 million in pay and reimbursements since 2010. That total includes an average of about $241,227 in annual pay and reimbursements to Hamilton from the eight authorities combined during the past eight years. It also includes $151,078 paid to one of Hamilton's side businesses, Opportunity Alliance."

=== Kane County Treasurer ===
In 2022, Lauzen was elected Kane County Treasurer, defeating Democrat Jeffrey Pripusich in the general election.

In 2026, Lauzen introduced changes to Kane County property tax bills intended to increase transparency, including the addition of taxing district contact information and graphical breakdowns of tax allocations.

== Personal life ==
Lauzen and his wife, Sarah, have four sons.

== Electoral history ==
- 2016 Race for Kane County Board Chairman
  - (R) Chris Lauzen 100%
- 2016 Race for Kane County Board Chairman – Republican primary
  - (R) Chris Lauzen 74%
  - (R) Ken Shepro 25%
- 2012 Race for Kane County Board Chairman
  - (R) Chris Lauzen 59.25%
  - (D) Sue Klinkhamer 40.75%
- 2012 Race for Kane County Board Chairman – Republican primary
  - (R) Kevin R Burns 29.28%
  - (R) Chris Lauzen 62.01%
- 2010 Race for Illinois 25th Senate District
  - (R) Chris Lauzen 69.3%
  - (D) Leslie Juby 30.7%
- 2008 Race for Illinois 14th Congressional Primary — Republican Party
  - Chris Lauzen 41%
  - Jim Oberweis 56%
  - Michael Dilger 2%
- 2006 Race for Illinois 25th Senate District
  - (R) Chris Lauzen 65.0%
  - (D) Frank Craig 35.0%
- 2002 Race for Illinois 25th Senate District
  - (R) Chris Lauzen 100.0%
- 2000 Race for Illinois 21st Senate District
  - (R) Chris Lauzen 64.9%
  - (D) Stephanie Downs Hughes 35.1%
- 1998 Race for comptroller
  - (D) Dan Hynes 58.6%
  - (R) Chris Lauzen 39.6%
  - McIntosh Sadler II 1.7%

Party political offices
Preceded by Loleta Didrickson	Republican nominee for Illinois Comptroller; 1998	Succeeded by Thomas Jefferson Ramsdell
