= Dave Syverson =

American politician

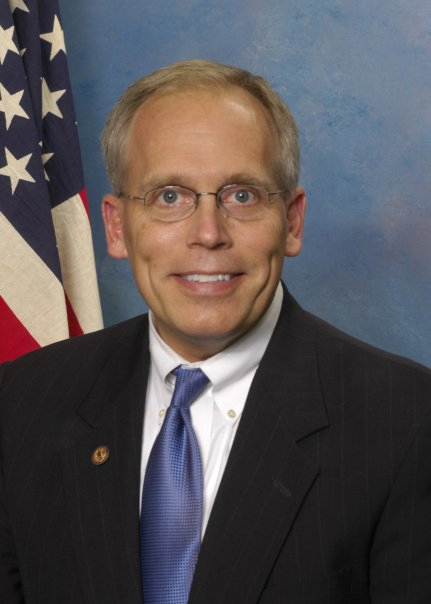

Member of the Illinois Senate from the 35th district
- Incumbent
- Assumed office 2013
- Preceded by: Christine J. Johnson

Member of the Illinois Senate from the 34th district
- In office 1993–2013
- Preceded by: Joyce Holmberg
- Succeeded by: Steve Stadelman

Personal details
- Born: June 29, 1957 (age 69) Chicago, Illinois, U.S.
- Party: Republican
- Profession: Insurance agency owner
- Website: https://senatordavesyverson.com

Dave Syverson (born June 29, 1957) is a Republican member of the Illinois Senate representing the 35th district since 2013. Previously, he represented the 34th district from 1993 to 2013.

== Early life, education and career ==
He was born June 29, 1957, in Chicago, Illinois, and moved to Rockford in his early childhood. He attended Guilford High School and Rock Valley College as a business major.

== Illinois Senate ==
Syverson was first elected to the Illinois State Senate in 1992. He joined a group of newly elected conservative State Senators called the "Fab Five". As a member of the Fab Five, along with Chris Lauzen, Steve Rauschenberger, Patrick O'Malley, and Peter Fitzgerald.

Syverson serves on the following Senate committees: Approp- Health and Human (Minority Spokesperson); Behavioral and Mental Health; Health and Human Services (Minority Spokesperson); Insurance (Minority Spokesperson); Licensed Activities; Local Government; Public Health.

During the 2008 Republican Party presidential primaries, Syverson worked on behalf of the presidential campaign of former U.S. Senator Fred Thompson serving as a congressional district chair for Illinois's 16th congressional district.

During his time in the Senate he has sponsored and passed over 100 of pieces of legislation aimed at improving the jobs climate in his state, reducing the size of Government, & local Government Tax Caps. In addition, he worked on many sweeping health care reforms including the legislation he sponsored, along with then State Senator Barack Obama, creating Illinois Kid Care health plan.

== Personal life ==
In addition to his Senate Role, Dave is a partner with Williams-Manny, Inc., and serves on the Board of MercyHealth. He lives in Rockford and has two children. Syverson is a member of the Rockford Chamber of Commerce, Rockford Area Economic Development Council, Rockford Machine Tool Association, National Federation of Independent Business, the National Association of Financial Planners, The Board of Advisors for Zion Development Corporation and Reformer's Unanimous International. Under a Charity Fund created by the Senator, and funded by giving up portions of his salary, he has been able to raise money to build neighborhood playgrounds for schools around his Senate district.

== Electoral history ==
2006 Illinois State Senate District 34 General Election
Party	Candidate	Votes	%
Republican	Dave Syverson	29,131	55.75
Democratic	Daniel Lewandowski	23,120	44.25
Total votes		52,251	100.0

2010 Illinois State Senate District 34 General Election
Party	Candidate	Votes	%
Republican	Dave Syverson	28,145	52.56
Democratic	Marla Wilson	25,407	47.44
Total votes		53,552	100.0

2012 Illinois State Senate District 35 General Election
Party	Candidate	Votes	%
Republican	Dave Syverson	72,411	100.0
Total votes		72,411	100.0

2016 Illinois State Senate District 35 General Election
Party	Candidate	Votes	%
Republican	Dave Syverson	78,269	100.0
Total votes		78,269	100.0

2018 Illinois State Senate District 35 General Election
Party	Candidate	Votes	%
Republican	Dave Syverson	62,422	100.0
Total votes		62,422	100.0

2022 Illinois State Senate District 35 General Election
Party	Candidate	Votes	%
Republican	Dave Syverson	65,233	100.0
Total votes		65,233	100.0
