= Oberweis Dairy =

American corporation

Oberweis Dairy, Inc.
- Type: Private
- Industry: Dairy, Restaurant, home delivery
- Founded: 1927; 99 years ago
- Headquarters: 951 Ice Cream Dr., North Aurora, Illinois, United States
- Number of locations: 39
- Area served: Illinois, Indiana, Michigan, Missouri, Wisconsin
- Key people: Renato DePaolis, CEO
- Products: Dairy and fast food
- Parent: Hoffmann Family of Companies
- Website: www.oberweis.com

Oberweis Dairy, headquartered in North Aurora, Illinois, is the parent company of several dairy-related and fast food restaurant operations in the midwest region of the United States. Its businesses include a home delivery service available in parts of Illinois, Indiana, Missouri, Michigan, and Wisconsin, which delivers traditional dairy products, including milk, ice cream, cheese, and yogurt, as well as bacon and seasonal products.

The businesses also include a chain of corporate-owned "Dairy and Ice Cream Stores", in the Chicago area, which sell many of the same products as the home delivery service, a distribution service which allows for some of their products (such as milk) to be available in regional supermarkets, and also includes a franchise service, which expanded the "Dairy and Ice Cream Stores" into Wisconsin, Indiana, Missouri, and Michigan after 2004.

In 2012, Oberweis also began a new franchise of high-end, fast food hamburger restaurants named "That Burger Joint".

As of 2025, the company operated 39 retail locations.

== History ==
In 1915, Peter J. Oberweis began selling his excess milk to his neighbors in Kane County, Illinois; the business became full-time in 1927. According to the Dairy's website, the family's farm was off of Molitor Road, in Aurora, Illinois. The family used a horse and milk float to deliver milk to their neighbors, beginning in 1927, after Peter J. Oberweis invested in half of the business of the Big Woods Dairy.

During the Great Depression, Peter's son Joe dropped out of high school to help run the business. The business continued in the family, with Joe running the business through the 1950s.

Jim Oberweis purchased the company from his brother in 1986 and named his son, Joe, CEO in 2007.

In 2017, Oberweis Dairy acquired Woodgrain Neapolitan Pizzeria, a pizzeria serving custom made personal pizzas.

In October 2022, Oberweis Dairy ceased their longstanding practice of purchasing from a select group of family farm patrons and instead began purchasing it from open-market cooperatives.

In April 2024, Oberweis Dairy filed for Chapter 11 bankruptcy. Adam Kraber was subsequently promoted to president to oversee the company's sale process. In May, the Hoffmann Family of Companies, a private equity firm based in Winnetka, Illinois, won a bid to purchase Oberweis Dairy out of bankruptcy. The new owners have plans to keep the company in operation as well as potentially expanding the brand.

In June 2024, Osprey Capital LLC, the investment arm of the Hoffmann Family of Companies, officially acquired Oberweis Dairy.

In August 2025, Oberweis Dairy opened its first new ice cream store since emerging from Chapter 11 bankruptcy.

In December 2025, Oberweis Dairy appointed Renato DePaolis II as CEO, succeeding Adam Kraber, who remained with the company as senior vice president of sales and growth.

In 2026, the company opened its first ice-cream-only outlet as part of a co-branded partnership with Giordano's in Naperville, Illinois.

In 2026, following the Hoffman Family's acquisition of the Pittsburgh Penguins, PPG Paints Arena and Aramark replaced the Milkshake Factory concession stand with Oberweis's Ice Cream.

== Operations ==
=== Home delivery ===
In 1927, the company's founder began a home delivery service, which has continued since that time. Delivery has been in glass bottles, in the same way milk was delivered throughout the United States in the 1960s. A modern smartphone app supports tracking and timing deliveries. Ice cream stores and home delivery each account for about 40% of the company's revenue, with grocery sales comprising roughly 20%.

=== Dairy and Ice Cream Stores ===
In 1951, the Dairy and Ice Cream Stores began operation. The company currently has locations, both corporate-owned and franchised, throughout Chicago, its suburbs, northwest Indiana, around St. Louis, Missouri, near Indianapolis, Indiana, Milwaukee, Wisconsin, and near Detroit, Michigan. Some projects for the retail stores were done on a trial basis at the company's corporate office in North Aurora (which also includes a retail store) before being put into place at other locations, such as the stores' drive-through service, and the lunch/sandwich program, which began in 2004 and ended in July 2006. In 2012, Oberweis said that each dairy store generates between $1.25 million and $1.75 million per year.

=== That Burger Joint ===
In 2012, Oberweis opened their first quick-service hamburger restaurant, named That Burger Joint, intended to expand as a chain and compete directly with Five Guys.
