= O'Malley (surname) =

O'Malley (Irish: Ó Máille [oː ˈmˠaːl̠ʲə]) is an Irish surname. According to historian C. Thomas Cairney, the O'Malleys were the chiefly family of the Partraige who were a tribe of the Erainn, the second wave of Celts to settle in Ireland between about 500 and 100 BC. However, the same historian also stated that another family of O'Malleys were a chiefly family of the Uí Mháine tribe who in turn were from the Dumnonii or Laigin who were the third wave of Celts to settle in Ireland during the first century BC.

== People ==
- Maille mac Conall of Umhaill
- Mary Ní Mháille (died 1525)
- Alice O'Malley (born 1962), American photographer
- Brian O'Malley (director), Irish film and television director
- Bryan "radiomaru" Lee O'Malley (born 1979), comic book creator
- Brian Kevin O'Malley (1930–1976), British politician
- Charles O'Malley (disambiguation)
  - Charles O'Malley (Michigan) (fl. 1834–1843), Irish fur trader and urban founder in Michigan, United States
  - Charles Conor O'Malley (1889-1982) Irish surgeon, writer, and Chief of the Name
  - Charles Donald O'Malley (1907–1970), American historian of medicine and Latinist
  - Charles J. O'Malley (1866–after 1939), Irish financier and newspaper reporter in the United States
- Conner O'Malley (born 1986), American comedian
- Daragh O'Malley (born 1954), Irish actor
- Debbie O'Malley, American politician
- Desmond O'Malley (1939–2021), Irish politician
- Donogh O'Malley (1921–1968), Irish politician
- Edward O'Malley (disambiguation)
  - Sir Edward Loughlin O'Malley (1842–1932), British lawyer, judge and political candidate
  - Edward R. O'Malley (1863–1935), American lawyer, politician and judge
  - Ed O'Malley (born 1975), American American non-profit executive, author and politician
- Edwin Joseph O'Malley (1881–1955), Commissioner of Public Markets for New York City
- Ernie O'Malley (1897–1957), Irish Republican Army officer
- Fiona O'Malley (born 1968), Irish politician
- Grace O'Malley (c. 1530 – c. 1603), Irish noblewoman and chieftainess
- Henry O'Malley (1876–1936), American fish culturist, United States Commissioner of Fisheries
- Iseult O'Malley (born 1964), Irish judge
- Jack O'Malley (Michigan politician), American politician
- Joan O'Malley, Canadian civil servant
- Joe O'Malley (1932–2015), American football player
- John O'Malley (1878–1940), American politician
- John F. O'Malley (1885–c. 1950), American architect
- John J. O'Malley (1915–1970), American architect
- John na Seoltadh Ó Máille (fl. 1568), Gaelic-Irish lord
- J. Pat O'Malley (1904–1985), English singer and actor
- Kate O'Malley (disambiguation)
  - Kate O'Malley, a British actress active in the 1990s who was a regular on the last two seasons of Soldier Soldier
  - Kathleen M. O'Malley (born 1956), United States federal judge
  - Katie O'Malley (born 1962), Maryland jurist, and first lady of Maryland
- King O'Malley (1858–1953), Australian politician
- Lewis Sydney Steward O'Malley (1874–1941), anthropologist in British India
- Mart O'Malley (1890–1972), Indiana state judge
- Martin O'Malley (born 1963), American politician
- Martin O'Malley (journalist) (1939–2025), Canadian journalist
- Mary O'Malley (disambiguation), various including
  - Mary O'Malley (author), American author and public speaker
  - Mary O'Malley (director) (1918–2006), Irish director
  - Mary O'Malley (playwright) (1941–2020), English playwright
  - Mary O'Malley (poet) (born 1954), Irish poet
- Matthew Vincent O'Malley (1878–1931), American politician
- Mick O'Malley (born 1972), Australian boxer of the 1990s and 2000s
- Mike O'Malley (born 1969), American actor
- Nick O'Malley (born 1985), indie-rock musician
- Sir Owen O'Malley (1887–1974), British diplomat
- Pamela O'Malley (1929–2006), Irish-Spanish bohemian, educationalist and radical
- Patrick O'Malley (disambiguation) or Pat O'Malley, various including
  - Patrick O'Malley (American politician) (born 1950), American politician from Illinois
  - Patrick O'Malley (Irish politician) (1943–2021), Irish politician
  - Padraig O'Malley (born 1942), Irish-American academic
  - Pádraic Ó Máille (1878–1946), Irish politician
  - Pat O'Malley (actor) (1890–1966), American actor
- Peter O'Malley (disambiguation)
  - Peter O'Malley (born 1937), American baseball executive
  - Peter O'Malley (cricketer) (1927–1957), New Zealand cricketer
  - Peter O'Malley (footballer) (fl. 1940s), New Zealand football player
  - Peter O'Malley (golfer) (born 1965), Australian golfer
- Robert Emmett O'Malley (born 1943), American Medal of Honor recipient
- Rory O'Malley (born 1980), Broadway actor
- Ryan O'Malley (born 1980), American baseball player
- Ryan O'Malley (American football) (born 1993), American football player
- Séamus O'Malley (1903–2002), Irish football player
- Seán Patrick O'Malley (born 1944), Roman Catholic Cardinal
- Sean O'Malley (fighter) (born 1994), American mixed martial artist
- Stephen O'Malley (born 1974), American musician/guitarist, producer, composer, and visual artist
- Susan O'Malley, American sports executive
- Susan O'Malley (artist) (1976–2015), public art, author and museum curator
- T. J. O'Malley (1915–2009), American aerospace engineer
- Thomas O'Malley (disambiguation)
  - Thomas O'Malley (congressman) (1903–1979), American politician from Wisconsin
  - Thomas O'Malley (writer), Irish writer
  - Thomas Francis O'Malley (1889–1954), American politician
  - Thomas J. O'Malley (1868–1936), American politician from Wisconsin
  - Thomas P. O'Malley (1930–2009), American Jesuit and academic
- Tim O'Malley (politician) (born 1944), Irish politician
- Tim O'Malley (rugby union) (born 1994), New Zealand rugby player
- Tim O'Malley (actor), author
- Tom O'Malley (born 1960), American baseball player
- Tom O'Malley (American football) (1925–2011), American football player
- Tony O'Malley (painter) (1913–2003), Irish painter
- Tuthal Ó Máille (fl.1413], Gaelic-Irish lord
- Walter O'Malley (1903–1979), American baseball team owner
- William O'Malley (disambiguation)
  - William O'Malley (politician) (1853–1939), Irish politician
  - William O'Malley (Jesuit) (1931–2023), American Jesuit priest, teacher, and author
- Zack O'Malley Greenburg (born 1985), American writer, journalist, and child actor

=== Fictional characters ===
- Mr. O'Malley, comic strip fairy-godfather
- Conor O'Malley, in dark fantasy drama film "A Monster Calls", directed by J. A. Bayona and written by Patrick Ness
- O'Malley, a fictional character in the machinima series Red vs. Blue
- Abraham de Lacy Giuseppe Casey Thomas O'Malley, from the 1970 Disney animated film The Aristocats
- George O'Malley, from Grey's Anatomy
- Father Charles "Chuck" O'Malley, from the films Going My Way and The Bells of St. Mary, and the TV series Going My Way
- Nellie O'Malley, from American Girl's Samantha sub-series
- Sally O'Malley, a recurring character on Saturday Night Live
- James Redford O'Malley, a side-character appearing in issue six of "The O'Malley Family & Co".

== See also ==
- Category:O'Malley family
- O'Malley (disambiguation)
- Irish clans
