= Charles O'Malley =

Charles O'Malley may refer to:

- Charles O'Malley (Michigan) (fl. 1834–1843), Irish fur trader and urban founder in Michigan, United States
- Charles Conor O'Malley (1889-1982), Irish surgeon, writer, and Chief of the Name
- Charles Donald O'Malley (1907–1970), American historian of medicine and Latinist
- Charles J. O'Malley (1866–1955), Irish financier and newspaper reporter in the United States
- Charles O'Malley, an 1841 novel by Charles Lever
