= Association of Italian Knights of the Sovereign Military Order of Malta =

The Association of Italian Knights of the Sovereign Military Order of Malta (Italian: Associazione dei cavalieri italiani del sovrano militare ordine di Malta, acronym ACISMOM) brings together the Knights and Ladies of the Sovereign Military Order of Malta of Italian nationality. It was founded in 1877 in Rome, it is currently based at the Casa dei Cavalieri di Rodi in the Piazza del Grillo, Rome.

== Activities ==
The association coordinates all the members of the three grand priories of Italy (who are responsible for managing spirituality and charitable activity) for the promotion and management of social and health activities.

=== Medical and health care ===
The ACISMOM runs multiple hospitals, among which the most important is the San Giovanni Battista hospital, at the Magliana in Rome, which specializes in physical rehabilitation.

The ACISMOM annually receives a share of the Italian National Health Fund (FSN) for health mobility:

- in 2008 it received €21,000,900;
- in 2009 it received €34,167,303;
- in 2010 it received €38,108,009
- in 2011 it received €35,501,689

=== Aid and civil protection ===
Since 1970 the association has run the Corpo italiano di soccorso dell'Ordine di Malta (CISOM), with more than 70 groups throughout Italy and over 3,000 volunteers, its tasks range from civil protection for medical aid, forest fire prevention, to transport of the sick. It uses a vast fleet of vehicles, with ambulances and specialist vehicles registered with the SMOM license plate.

=== Military auxiliary services ===
Among its first initiatives, the association stipulated a series of agreements with the then Ministero della guerra del Regno d'Italia which led to the formation of the Military Corps of the SMOM that joined the Royal Italian Army to provide services in case of conflict or natural disasters .

The Corps operated in the Italo-Turkish War and in the two world wars, as a "special military body and auxiliary of the Italian Army". The Corps provides support with a field hospital and two SMOM hospital trains, operating both in peacekeeping missions alongside the military and in the national territory on the occasion of disasters and natural disasters.

In 1940, the Military Corps was joined by the Corps of Volunteer Nurses of the ACISMOM, consisting of a director and 40 nurses, ladies of the Sovereign Military Order of Malta.

== Presidents and magistrates commissioners ==
- Mario Chigi Albani della Rovere, 1877-1914;
- Prospero Colonna, Prince of Sonnino, 1915-1922;
- Paolo Thaon di Revel, Grande ammiraglio, 1922-1922;
- Prospero Colonna, Prince of Sonnino, 1922-1937;
- Mario Nomis by Cossilla, 1937-1942;
- Francesco Antici Mattei, 1942- 1945;
- Rufo Ruffo della Scaletta (Ruffo di Calabria), 1945-1955;
- Filippo Caffarelli, 1955- 1957;
- Enzo di Napoli Rampolla, Prince of Resuttano, 1957-1963;
- Ugo Theodoli, 1963-1974;
- Aspreno Colonna, Prince of Paliano, 1974-1976;
- Giulio del Balzo of Presenzano, 1977-1979;
- Giulio del Balzo di Presenzano, 1979-1984;
- Francesco Colonna, Duke of Garigliano, 1984-1986;
- Carlo Marullo di Condojanni, Prince of Casalnuovo, 1986-1986;
- Galeazzo Ruspoli, Duke of Morignano, 1986-1987;
- Francesco Colonna, Duca del Garigliano, 1987-1989;
- Gabriele Ussani of Escobar, 1989-1992;
- Carlo Arditi of Castelvetere, 1992-1994;
- Giovan Pietro Caffarelli, 1994-1998;
- Sforza Ruspoli Marescotti, Prince of Cerveteri, 1999-1999;
- Carlo Massimo, 1999-2000;
- Fausto Solaro del Borgo, 2000-2009;
- Narciso Salvo Petraganzili, 2009-2011;
- Janos von Esterhazy de Galantha, 2011-2014;
- Riccardo Paternò di Montecupo, 2014-2022
- Lorenzo Borghese, 2022-

== See also ==
- Gran priorato di Roma del sovrano militare ordine di Malta
- Gran priorato di Lombardia e Venezia del sovrano militare ordine di Malta
- Gran priorato di Napoli e Sicilia del sovrano militare ordine di Malta
- Malteser International
- Orders, decorations, and medals of the Sovereign Military Order of Malta
- Orders, decorations, and medals of Italy
- Regina Margherita (nave ospedale)
- Museo storico del Corpo militare dell'ACISMOM
