= Order of Malta Ambulance Corps =

Irish voluntary ambulance and first aid organisation

Order of Malta Ireland - Ambulance Corps
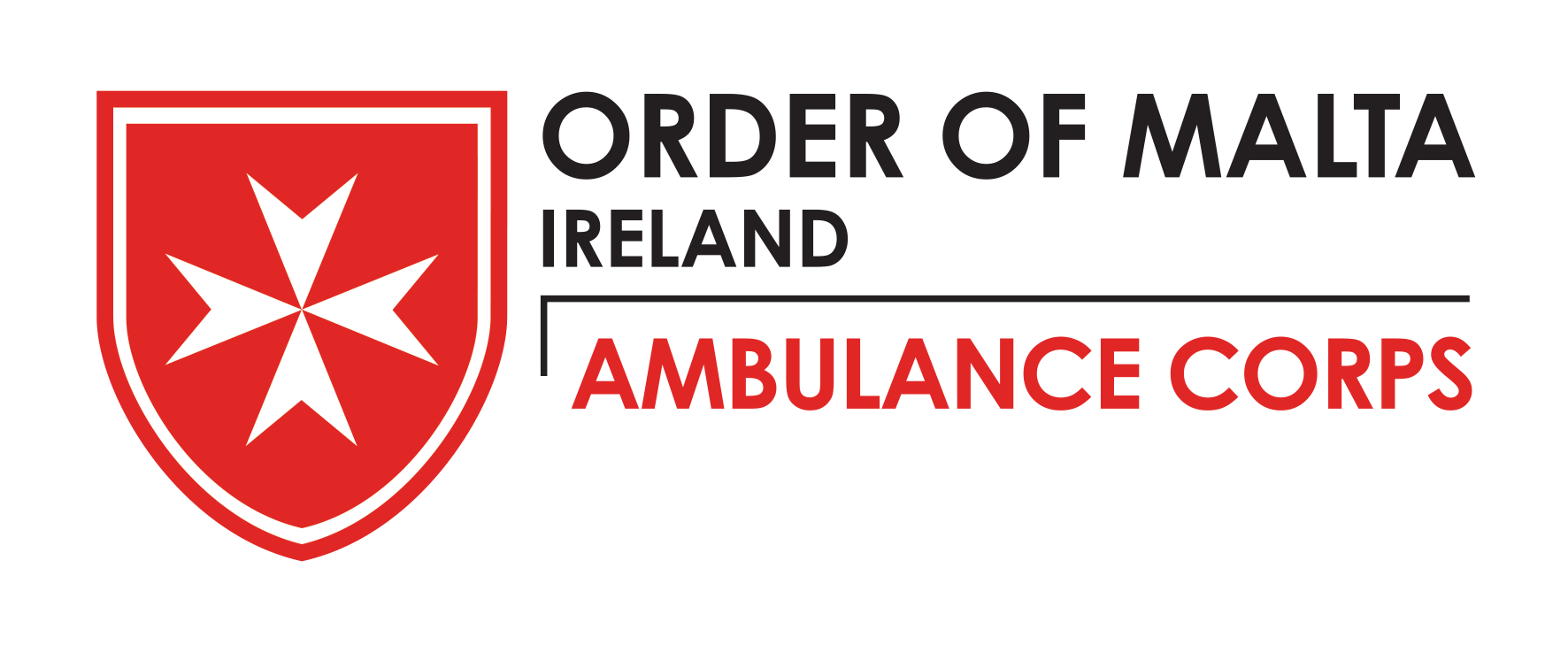
- Formation: 1938
- Founded at: Galway
- Type: Non-governmental, charitable voluntary organisation, voluntary emergency service
- Registration no.: Ireland: CHY4538 Northern Ireland: Accepted by HMRC under reference XR40765
- Headquarters: Saint John House, 32 Clyde Road, Ballsbridge, Dublin 4
- Location: Ireland
- Services: Ambulance services, medical aid, training services, community care, nursing-respite services, youth programs, emergency medical services, assisting statutory services during major emergencies
- President: Richard Duc de Stacpoole KM
- Key people: Ambulance Corps National Director Commander Brian Coote KM
- Affiliations: Sovereign Military Order of Malta
- Staff: Administrative staff in headquarters
- Volunteers: 5,000+
- Website: www.orderofmaltaireland.org

The Order of Malta Ireland – Ambulance Corps is a voluntary ambulance and first aid organisation operating in Ireland in affiliation with the Sovereign Military Order of Malta, founded in 1938.

Its purposes include teaching first aid, providing ambulance cover at large events, medical aid, patient transport, and community and nursing services. The Sovereign Military Order of Malta has over 5,000 volunteers throughout the island of Ireland. Its headquarters are located in Saint John House, 32 Clyde Road, Ballsbridge, Dublin 4, Ireland.

== History ==
The first unit of the Order of Malta Ambulance Corps was founded in 1938, when Conor O'Malley, a Galway doctor, was asked by Marquis McSweeney, the then chancellor of the Irish Association, to recruit members to form an ambulance corps, aimed initially for Connaught only.

Thirteen men were recruited by Professor O'Malley: six sixth year students from St. Josephs College "the Bish", Secondary School; four members from C.Y.M.S., Galway; two Scout Masters; and one "lay" member. These thirteen members were the founding members of the ambulance corps in Galway.

The new recruits were enrolled on a series of First Aid lectures, given by Professor O'Malley in the X-Ray Department of the Central Hospital . The bandaging was taught by Theatre Sister Mary Shaughnessy. Examinations in First Aid were held in January 1938 and all were successful. In February 1938 First Aid services were requested for a National League match in Castlebar. The duties were allocated in alphabetical order meaning "Burke" and "Coogan" were first on duty.

The first Officer in Charge of the Galway Unit was Sgt. Timothy Murphy. A second unit was set up in 1939 in Killarney and since then the Ambulance Corps has grown in strength providing First Aid cover for many major sporting and cultural events and concerts.

During the period of The Troubles in the city of Derry, the Ambulance Corps played a key role as a healthcare organisation that provided first aid to people injured in rioting and confrontations such as the Battle of the Bogside and Bloody Sunday, when their humanitarian task got document in pictures of them wearing military-like uniforms, white coats and even gas masks. On 29 January 2023, a plaque was unveiled in Derry dedicated to the Ambulance Corps' role in assisting wounded and dying people in the course of the conflict.

== Modern organisation ==
The Ambulance Corps is a national organisation with 5,346 members involved in 86 units across the Island of Ireland. For administration purposes, the country is divided into regions which are managed by regional directors.

Each region consists of a number of units which deliver services at local level. The organisation operates over 170 ambulances, mobile accident and emergency suites, support vehicles, medical response bikes, Rapid Response Vehicles (RRVs) and mobile command and control centres. The Ambulance Corps uses the TETRA Radio system in line with the statutory emergency services in Ireland.

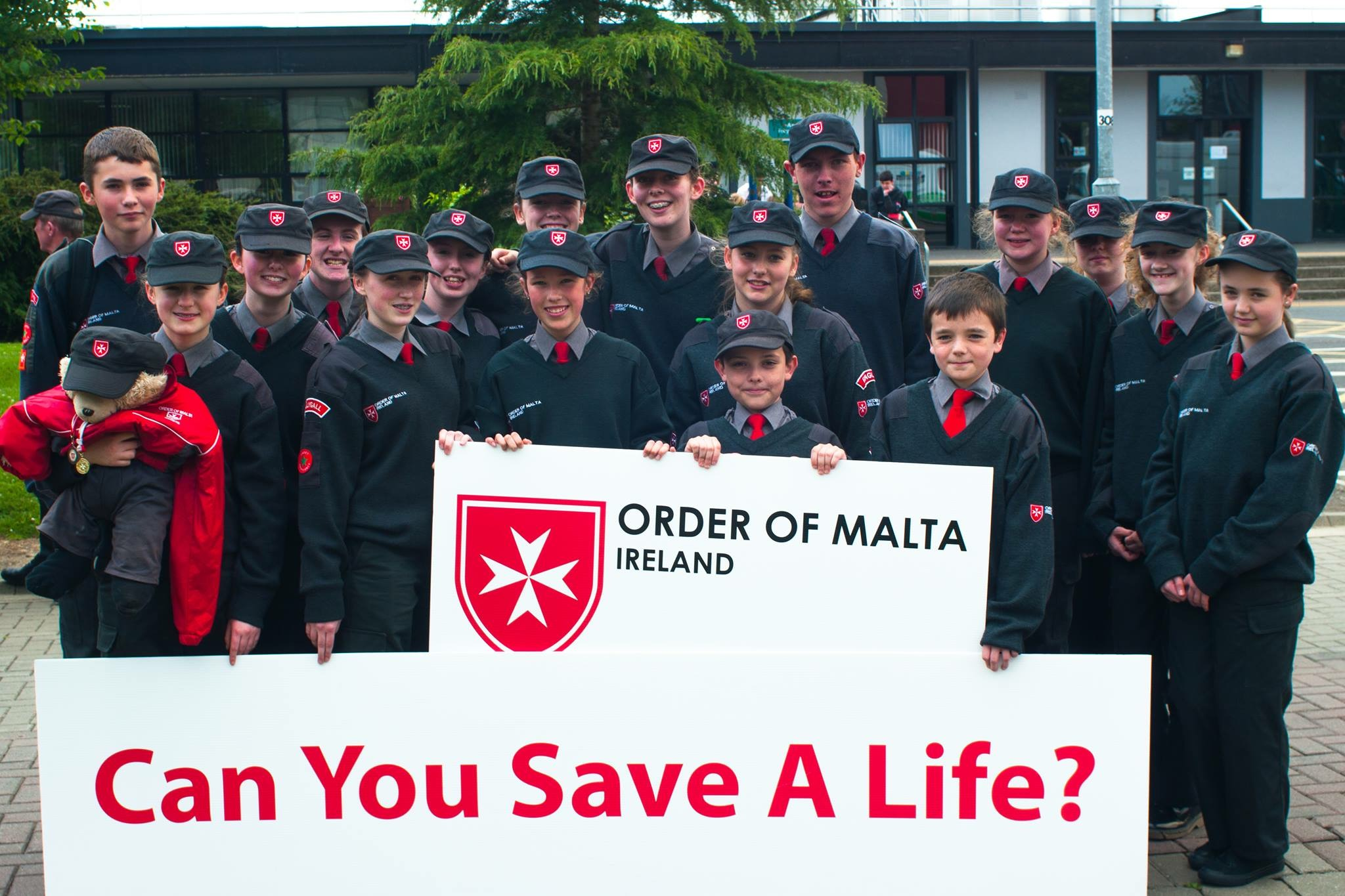
Cadets

The organisations headquarters are located in St John's House Clyde Road, Ballsbridge, Dublin 4. Within the building there are modern lecture halls for training and a command and control centre to coordinate vehicles and personnel in the event of major incidents.

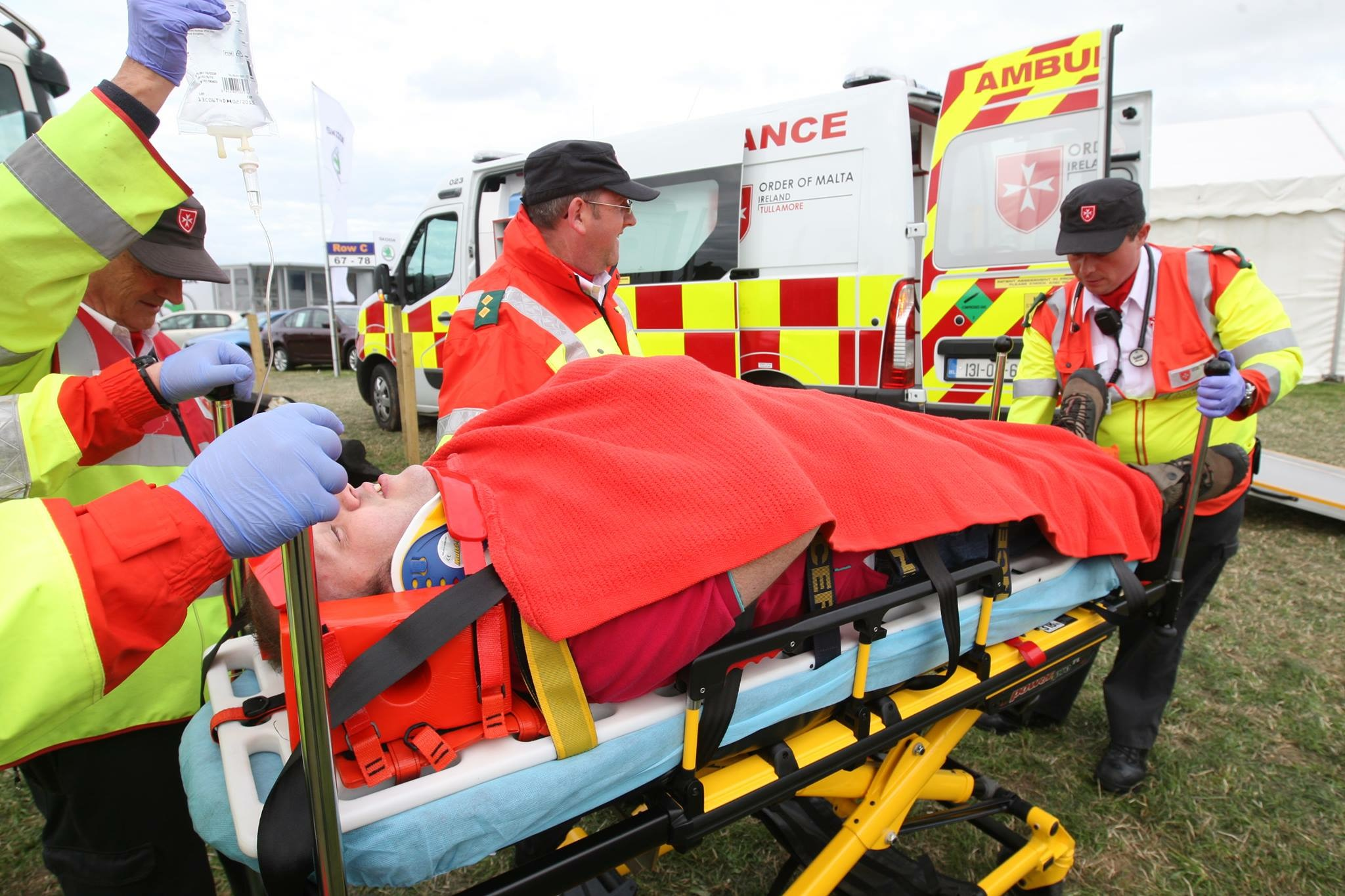
Ambulance Corps volunteers

Through their youth section, Order of Malta Cadets accommodates children aged 10–16 years. Cadets are trained in basic life saving skills: first aid, CPR and assisting with activities of daily living.

The organisation provides a full program of youth development and sporting activities for young people and encourages them to continue developing their citizenship skills. Additionally, cadets are involved in the community helping the elderly and disabled both locally and internationally.

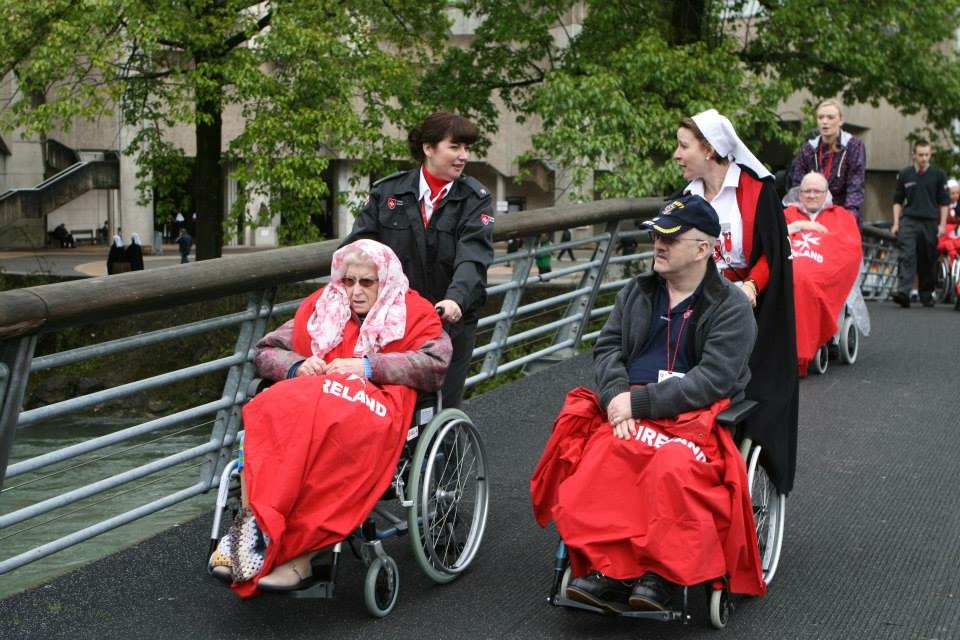
Lourdes pilgrimage

The ambulance corps coordinate a range of community care services including day care centres, community care centres and centres for older people. They also provide essential respite for young disabled people at their purpose facilities in the Share Holiday Village.

The ambulance corps assist pilgrims to Knock, Croagh Patrick and Lourdes annually.

Order of Malta Ireland is a registered as a charity in the Republic of Ireland as Malta Charities, CHY4538. Malta Charities is accepted as a charity in Northern Ireland by HMRC under reference XR40765.

== Senior members ==
The national director of the Order of Malta Ambulance Corps is Comdr. Brian Coote, KM. In common with all members of the Ambulance Corps, Coote is a volunteer. He is assisted by two deputy directors, David Birchall KM and Bernard Guthrie KM, Chief Medical Officer Dr. Lisa Cunningham DM, and a staff with responsibility for different areas of ambulance corps work.

The president of the Irish Association of the Sovereign Military Order of Malta is Richard Duc de Stacpoole, KM, who succeeded Sir Adrian FitzGerald, Bt., the Knight of Kerry, KM.

== Ranks ==
Cadet ranks (ages 10–16)

- Cadet (Red Epaulette)
- Cadet Corporal (Two downward facing chevrons)
- Cadet Sergeant (Three downward cheverons)

Adult ranks (ages 16+)

- Volunteer (Red Epaulette)

Non-commissioned officers ranks

- Corporal (two downward chevrons)
- Sergeant (three downward chevrons)
- Adjutant (three downward chevrons and a gold Malteser pip)

Commissioned officers ranks

- Second Lieutenant (one pip)
- First Lieutenant (two pips)
- Captain (three pips)
- Commandant (not Major)
- Assistant Commander (not Lieutenant Colonel)
- Commander (not Colonel)
- Assistant National Director
- Deputy National Director
- National Director

Volunteers wear epaulettes with a Maltese Cross while members holding a rank wear an epaulette with the Maltese Cross plus rank markings on the shoulders of the uniform. Different colour epaulettes are used to denote various medical qualifications and if a member is a member of the Catholic clergy.

- Red for members trained as cardiac first responders, First Aid Responders, and Emergency First Responders
- Green for Emergency Medical Technicians
- Navy Blue for Paramedic
- Yellow for Advanced Paramedics
- Light Blue for nurse
- Red for Medical Physician Doctor
- Black for member of the Clergy. Clergy are also granted the commissioned rank of Captain as displayed on epaulettes of uniform.

== National organisation ==
The Order of Malta Ambulance Corps aims to have at least one unit based in every county in Ireland. The island of Ireland is divided into nine regions, each region administered by a regional director.

=== Regions and units ===
The island of Ireland is divided into nine regions, each with an appointed regional director who reports directly to the Deputy National Director. The regions are:

Northern Region
Antrim, Armagh, Down, Fermanagh, Tyrone and Derry

North Western Region
Mayo, Sligo & Leitrim. (Currently there are no units in Donegal)

Western Region
Galway and Roscommon

South Western Region
Clare, Limerick, Cork and Kerry

South Eastern Region
Carlow, Kilkenny, Waterford, and Wexford

Eastern Region
Dublin and Wicklow

Midlands Region
Tipperary, Westmeath, Offaly, Longford, Laois and Kildare

North Eastern Region
Louth and Meath (Currently there are no units in Cavan and Monaghan)

== See also ==
- Sovereign Military Order of Malta
- Orders, decorations, and medals of the Sovereign Military Order of Malta
- St John Ambulance Ireland
- Military Corps of the Sovereign Military Order of Malta
- Malteser International
- Corps of Volunteer Nurses of the Sovereign Military Order of Malta
