= Patrick O'Malley =

Patrick or Pat O'Malley may refer to:

- Patrick O'Malley (American politician) (born 1950), former Illinois State Senator
- Patrick O'Malley (Irish politician) (1943–2021), Irish Progressive Democrats politician 1987–1989
- Padraig O'Malley (born 1942), Irish-American academic
- Pádraic Ó Máille (1878–1946), Irish politician
- Pat O'Malley (actor) (1890–1966), American actor
- J. Pat O'Malley (1904–1985), English singer and actor
- Seán Patrick O'Malley (born 1944), American cardinal of the Roman Catholic Church

== See also ==
- O'Malley (surname)
