= John O'Malley =

John O'Malley may refer to:

- John O'Malley (politician) (1878–1940), American politician and businessman in Milwaukee, Wisconsin
- John F. O'Malley (1885–c.1950), American architect based in Rhode Island
- John J. O'Malley (1915–1970), American architect primarily for the Archdiocese of New York
- John W. O'Malley (1927-2022), American historian of early modern Europe, Jesuit priest

== See also ==
- John O'Meally
- John Mallee
