= Military Corps of the Sovereign Military Order of Malta =

Military Corps of the Association of Italian Knights of the Sovereign Military Order of Malta
- Corpo speciale volontario ausiliario dell'Esercito Italiano dell'Associazione dei cavalieri italiani del Sovrano militare Ordine di Malta
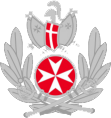
- Coat of arms of the Military Corps
- Founded: 19 January 1877 (149 years, 9 months)
- Country: Italy; SMOM
- Type: Army
- Role: Military medicine
- Size: 600
- Part of: Italian Armed Forces
- Garrison/HQ: Casa dei Cavalieri di Rodi, Rome, Italy
- Nickname: ACISMOM
- Anniversaries: 4 November, Italian National Unity and Armed Forces Day; 29 January, Military Corps Day
- Engagements: World War I Spanish Civil War; World War II; Yugoslav Wars; Kosovo War: Kosovo Force; Lebanese Civil War: War in Afghanistan (2001-2021); UNIFIL; Libyan civil war (2011); Somali Civil War; Syrian civil war Red Sea crisis

Commanders
- President of Italy: Sergio Mattarella
- Grand Master: John T. Dunlap
- Italian Chief of Staff: Generale di Corpo d'Armata; Carmine Masiello
- SMOM Chief of Staff: Generale Direttore Capo del Personale; Tommaso Gargallo di Castel Lentini

Insignia
- Flag

The Military Corps of the Association of Italian Knights of the Sovereign Military Order of Malta (Italian: Corpo speciale volontario ausiliario dell'Esercito Italiano dell'Associazione dei cavalieri italiani del Sovrano militare Ordine di Malta, Corpo Militare EI-SMOM), is a voluntary auxiliary body of the Italian Army for health and humanitarian assistance.

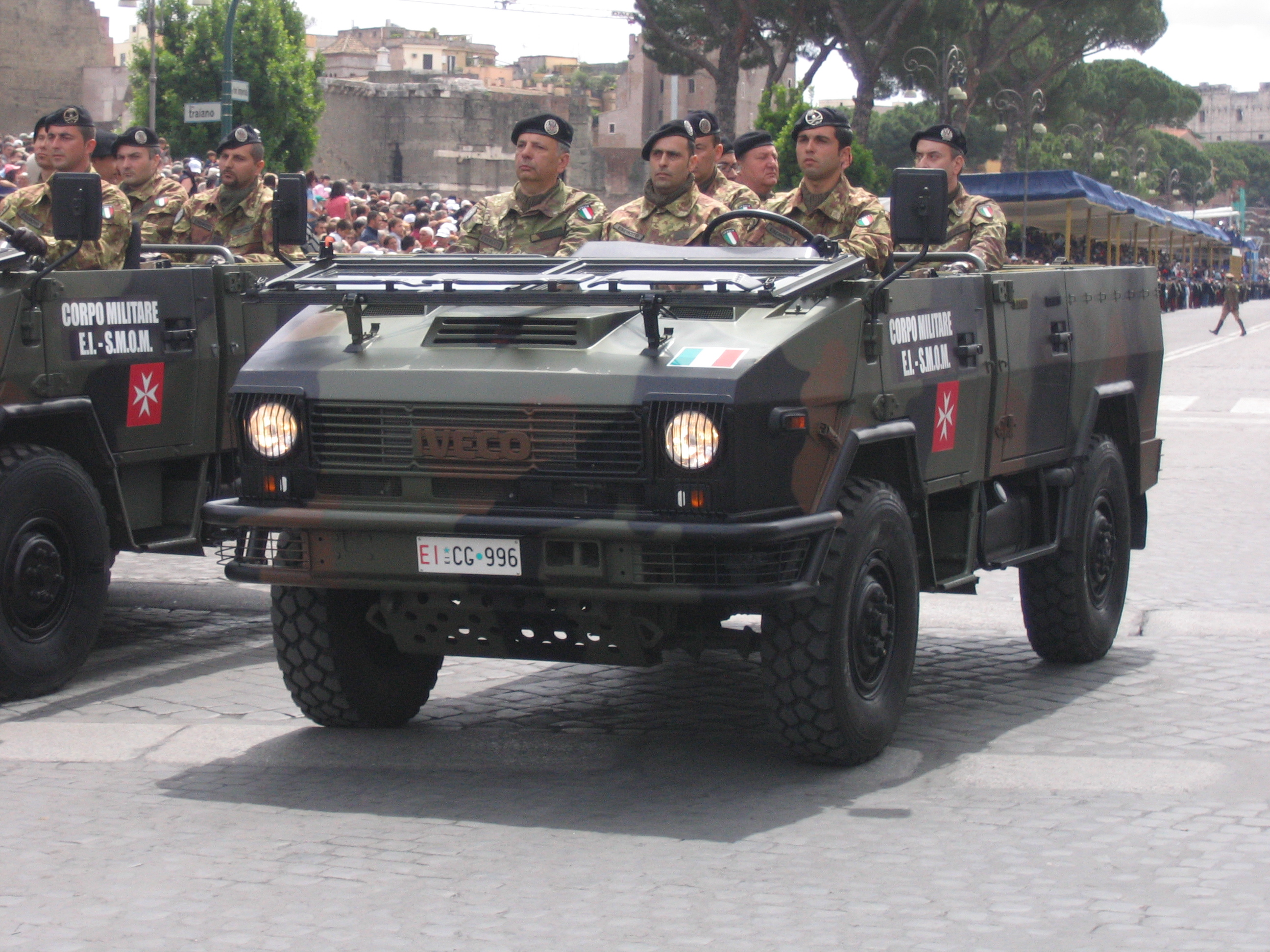
Army parade in Italy, Republic Day 2007

A successor to the armed forces of the Sovereign Military Order of Malta (the Navy of the Order, the Guard of the Grand Master, the Regiment of Malta (infantry), the Regiment of the Falconers (hunters), the Regiment of Cavalry, and the Company of Bombardiers), the Military Corps was founded on 19 January 1877 as the Association of Italian Knights of the Sovereign Military Order of Malta, with the purpose of providing support and health services for the then Royal Italian Army, both in times of war and peace. With circular letter n. 156 of the Official Military Journal of 9 April 1909, by order of King Victor Emmanuel III of Italy, became a special auxiliary body of the Royal Italian Army and adopted the gray-green uniform.

The Military Corps has been involved in a variety of conflicts. In the Italo-Turkish War (1911–1912) to the Corps was given the Regia Marina Hospital ship Regina Margherita (nave ospedale), which made seven crossings between Naples and Libya, repatriating 1,162 wounded and sick. Mobilized for the First World War (1914–1918), the Military Corps operated with eight relief posts at the front, a field hospital, a territorial hospital in Rome and four hospital trains that transported 448,000 sick over 560,000 km. In addition to honors and a commendation by General Diaz, on October 23 1921, the Corps was granted the use of a banner similar to that established for the Corpo sanitario dell'Esercito Italiano of the Royal Italian Army.

== See also ==
- Malteser International
- Corps of Volunteer Nurses of the ACISMOM
- Direzione generale della sanità militare
- Servizio di sanità militare
- Corpo italiano di soccorso dell'Ordine di Malta
- Distintivo d'onore al merito del corpo militare
- Museo storico del Corpo militare dell'ACISMOM
