= KHF =

KHF may refer to:

- Korea Handball Federation
- Kazakhstan Handball Federation
- Kansas Health Foundation
- Kevin Harvick Foundation
- Korea Hapkido Federation
