= Thomas O'Malley =

Thomas O'Malley may refer to:

- Thomas Francis O'Malley (1889–1954), American politician
- Thomas O'Malley (congressman) (1903–1979), U.S. representative from Wisconsin
- Thomas J. O'Malley (1868–1936), American politician, lieutenant governor of Wisconsin
- Thomas O'Malley (writer), Irish writer
- Thomas P. O'Malley (1930–2009), American Jesuit and academic
- Thomas D. O'Malley Jr. (1933–1998), American politician, treasurer of Florida
- Tom O'Malley (born 1960), former American Major League Baseball player
- Tom O'Malley (American football) (1925–2011), American football player
- T. J. O'Malley (1915–2009), American aerospace engineer
- Thomas O'Malley (born 2004), British bassist, bassist for Ingested, Worm Shepherd and Steel Mage
- Thomas O'Malley, the alley cat in the film The Aristocats
