= Anne Bozeman Lyon =

American author (1860–1936)

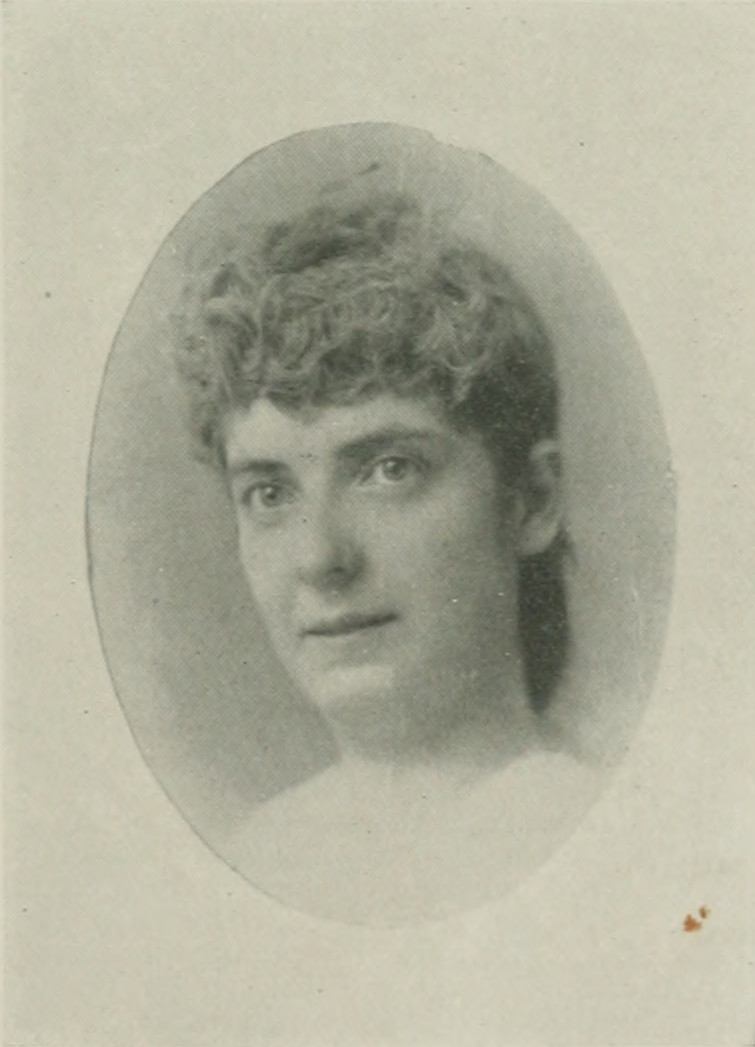
- Portrait from A Woman of the Century
- Born: February 25, 1860; Mobile, Alabama, U.S.
- Died: December 25, 1936 (aged 76); Mobile, Alabama
- Occupation: Gulf States writer
- Relatives: David Hunter Strother
- Writing career
- Genres: poetry; short stories; novels; newspaper articles

Anne Bozeman Lyon (1860–1936) was an American Gulf States author of Southern U.S. literature. She wrote poetry, short sketches and novels, excelling in descriptive work. Lyon wrote verses for the Louisville Courier-Journal and other daily papers before 1890, and afterward, short stories and articles for various papers and magazines. She made a special study of colonial history of Alabama and Louisiana.

== Early life and education ==
Anne Bozeman Lyon was born in Mobile, Alabama, February 25, 1860. Her parents were Thomas Temple Armstrong and Mary Morgan Coffee (Heard) Lyon. Her father's ancestors were English and Welsh. He was connected with families from Virginia, among them the Temples, the Pendletons and the Strothers. General David Hunter Strother of the Union Army was his cousin. Mr. Armstrong was a native of Stokes County, North Carolina, later a resident of Mobile, where he was successfully engaged in the wholesale mercantile and cotton business. He was a major in the Confederate States Army. Anne's mother was a descendant of two families from Georgia. Anne was the oldest of ten children. In early childhood, she resided in Mobile and in the bayou of the Mississippi River, where her father was constructing a railroad.

Lyon received her preparatory and academic education in Locquet Institute and other schools in New Orleans, Louisiana. This was followed by further studies in Mobile at the Quigley school and with Prof. Amos Towle, specializing in modern languages and music. Her favorite studies were French, history and mythology, and she enjoyed read poetry.

== Career ==
Her first published verses appeared in the Memphis Appeal, in 1884–86, and in the Louisville Courier-Journal about the same date. Her character sketches, verses, short stories and "negro dialect" stories were published in the New Orleans Times-Democrat during 1892. In 1892, she won a prize in the Current Literature category for a dramatic etching, entitled "The Mourner" against 1,300 competitors. "Mobile's distinguished women" was published in the Montgomery Advertiser, November 1893. Vanity Fair became the publishing medium during 1895–96. Dr. Charles J. O'Malley published Lyon's "Padre Felipo: A Story of Old Mobile" in Poor Soul's Advocate, 1895, and in a 2-volume book form in the same year. It was Lyon's first short colonial story. It was widely copied, and received the commendation of Walter Lecky, the novelist, and others. Early Missions of the South (1893) was published in Germany and in England, and adopted as a textbook in some of the schools of Florida.

Other writings by her included: "A Futile amendment", published in The Southern Magazine, Louisville, Kentucky; "Ninita", published in The Mid-Continent Magazine (formerly The Southern Magazine); "Chitto's marriage", published in The Catholic Telegraph, Cincinnati; "L'Huile de Marie", published in Chicago New World; and "Casimir Jacques", published in The National Magazine, Boston, and in book form in 1912. "The Bonapartist in Alabama", appeared in Southern Home Journal, April 1900, and was published in book form in 1903.

In addition to the foregoing, she also did considerabale newspaper and feature work, and wrote a number of historical articles from time to time. She was a contributor to the Stratford Journal, Boston Transcript, Ladies' World, and the Mobile Tribune.

No Saint (Louisville, 1890), her first novel, made an immediate name for itself. At Sterling's Camp, her second novel, was equally well received.

The realism of Lyon's fiction is explained by her statement: "When I start one of these colonial stories, I see the characters vividly, and actually hear their names and feel their presence. They move and sway me and not I them. When the story is done, I couldn't write another until the spirit moves me, not if I were going to be burned at the stake."

For some time, she conducted the "Feminine Fancies" woman's department for the Saturday Review of Mobile.

She was a member of the National League of American Pen Women, serving as the Alabama state representative, 1917–1919. She was also a member of The Poetry Society of London.

== Personal life ==
Lyon was a member of the Daughters of the American Revolution.

Anne Bozeman Lyon made her home in Mobile, Alabama, where she died December 25, 1936.

== Selected works ==
=== Books ===
- No Saint, 1890
- At Sterling's Camp
- Early Missions of the South, 1893
- Padre Felipo and Other Stories of Old Mobile (2 vol.), 1895
- The Bonapartist in Alabama, 1903
- Casimir Jacque, 1912

=== Short stories ===
- "The Mourner", 1892
- "Mobile's distinguished women", November 1893
- "Padre Felipo: A Story of Old Mobile", 1895
- "A Futile amendment"
- "Ninita"
- "Chitto's marriage"
- "L'Huile de Marie",
- "Casemir-Jacques"
- "The Bonapartist in Alabama", April 1900
