= William O'Malley =

William O'Malley may refer to:

- William O'Malley (Jesuit) (1931–2023), American Jesuit priest, author, and actor
- William O'Malley (politician) (1853–1939), Irish Member of Parliament representing Galway Connemara
