= KHI =

KHI may refer to:

- Khi, a Coptic letter
- Jinnah International Airport (IATA: KHI) at Karachi, Pakistan
- Kansas Health Institute founded by Kansas Health Foundation
- Karachi City
- Karnatak Health Institute, India, co-founded by N. S. Hardikar
- Kawasaki Heavy Industries, a Japanese multinational corporation
- Kelvin-Helmholtz instability, a type of fluid instability
- Kevin Harvick Incorporated, a NASCAR team
- Kinetic Hydrate Inhibitor
- Kunsthistorisches Institut in Florenz, Florence, Italy
- Kyiv Art Institute, Ukraine

== See also ==
- WKHI, former name of radio station WWFG, Ocean City, Maryland
