= Peter O'Malley (disambiguation) =

Peter O'Malley (born 1937) is an American baseball executive.

Peter O'Malley may also refer to:

- Peter O'Malley (cricketer) (1927–1997), New Zealand cricketer
- Peter O'Malley (footballer), New Zealand international football (soccer) player
- Peter O'Malley (golfer) (born 1965), Australian golfer
