= Galway Connemara =

UK parliamentary constituency in Ireland, 1885–1922

- Former county constituency for the House of Commons

1885–1922
- Seats: 1
- Created from: County Galway; Galway Borough (from 1918)
- Replaced by: Galway

Connemara, a division of County Galway, was a UK Parliament constituency in Ireland, returning one Member of Parliament (MP) from 1885 to 1922.

Prior to the 1885 general election the area was part of the County Galway constituency. From 1922, on the establishment of the Irish Free State, it was not represented in the UK Parliament.

== Boundaries ==
This constituency comprised the north-western part of County Galway, roughly corresponding to the region of Connemara. In 1918, with the abolition of the Galway borough constituency, the constituency was redrawn to include the town of Galway and exclude an area which had been transferred to County Mayo under the 1898 Local Government Act.

1885–1918: The baronies of Ballynahinch, Moycullen, and Ross.

1918–1922: The rural districts of Clifden and Oughterard, the district electoral divisions of Barna, Furbogh, Kilcummin, Killannin, Moycullen, Selerna, Slievenaneena, Spiddle and Tullokyne in the rural district of Galway, and the urban district of Galway.

== Members of Parliament ==
| Election | Member | Party |
|---|---|---|
| 1885 | Patrick James Foley | Irish Parliamentary Party |
| 1895 | William O'Malley | Irish National Federation |
| 1918 | Pádraic Ó Máille | Sinn Féin |
| 1921 | Constituency merged into Galway (Dáil constituency) | |

== Elections ==
=== Elections in the 1880s ===
General election 27 November 1885: Galway Connemara
| Party | Candidate | Votes | % | ±% |
|---|---|---|---|---|
| Irish Parliamentary | Patrick James Foley | Unopposed | | |
| Registered electors | | 5,842 | | |
| Irish Parliamentary win (new seat) | | | | |

General election 6 July 1886: Galway Connemara
| Party | Candidate | Votes | % | ±% |
|---|---|---|---|---|
| Irish Parliamentary | Patrick James Foley | Unopposed | | |
| Registered electors | | 5,842 | | |
| Irish Parliamentary hold | | | | |

=== Elections in the 1890s ===
General election 13 July 1892: Galway Connemara
| Party | Candidate | Votes | % | ±% |
|---|---|---|---|---|
| Irish National Federation | Patrick James Foley | 2,637 | 81.5 | N/A |
| Irish National League | John Henry Joyce | 598 | 18.5 | N/A |
| Majority | | 2,039 | 63.0 | N/A |
| Turnout | | 4,676 | 47.5 | N/A |
| Registered electors | | 6,815 | | |
| Irish National Federation gain from Irish Parliamentary | | Swing | N/A | |

General election 19 July 1895: Galway Connemara
| Party | Candidate | Votes | % | ±% |
|---|---|---|---|---|
| Irish National Federation | William O'Malley | Unopposed | | |
| Registered electors | | 7,155 | | |
| Irish National Federation hold | | | | |

=== Elections in the 1900s ===
General election 3 October 1900: Galway Connemara
| Party | Candidate | Votes | % | ±% |
|---|---|---|---|---|
| Irish Parliamentary | William O'Malley | Unopposed | | |
| Registered electors | | 8,423 | | |
| Irish Parliamentary hold | | | | |

General election 19 January 1906: Galway Connemara
| Party | Candidate | Votes | % | ±% |
|---|---|---|---|---|
| Irish Parliamentary | William O'Malley | Unopposed | | |
| Registered electors | | 6,438 | | |
| Irish Parliamentary hold | | | | |

=== Elections in the 1910s ===
General election 22 January 1910: Galway Connemara
| Party | Candidate | Votes | % | ±% |
|---|---|---|---|---|
| Irish Parliamentary | William O'Malley | Unopposed | | |
| Registered electors | | 6,248 | | |
| Irish Parliamentary hold | | | | |

General election 8 December 1910: Galway Connemara
| Party | Candidate | Votes | % | ±% |
|---|---|---|---|---|
| Irish Parliamentary | William O'Malley | Unopposed | | |
| Registered electors | | 6,248 | | |
| Irish Parliamentary hold | | | | |

General Election 14 December 1918: Galway Connemara
| Party | Candidate | Votes | % | ±% |
|---|---|---|---|---|
| Sinn Féin | Pádraic Ó Máille | 11,754 | 77.1 | New |
| Irish Parliamentary | William O'Malley | 3,482 | 22.9 | N/A |
| Majority | | 8,272 | 54.2 | N/A |
| Turnout | | 15,236 | 61.1 | N/A |
| Registered electors | | 24,956 | | |
| Sinn Féin gain from Irish Parliamentary | | Swing | N/A | |

== Sources ==
Walker, Brian M., ed. (1978). Parliamentary Election Results in Ireland, 1801–1922. Dublin: Royal Irish Academy. ISBN 0901714127.
