= Edward O'Malley =

Edward O'Malley may refer to:

- Sir Edward Loughlin O'Malley (1842–1932), British lawyer, judge and unsuccessful political candidate
- Edward R. O'Malley (1863–1935), American lawyer, politician and judge
- Ed O'Malley (born 1975), American non-profit executive, author and politician
