= Patrick James Foley =

Irish IPP politician (1836–1914)

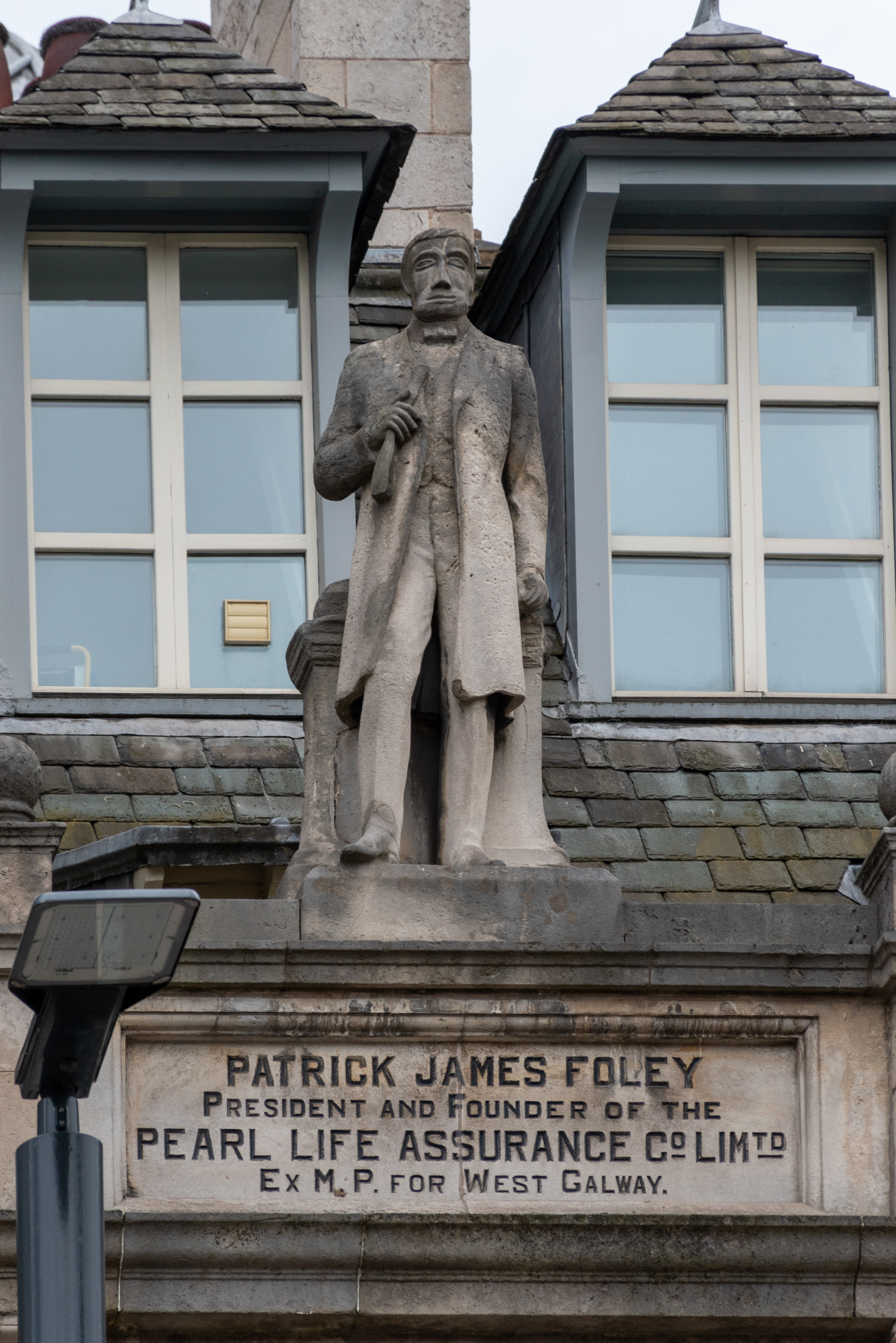
A statue of Foley on top of the Pearl Assurance building on the Headrow, Leeds

Patrick James Foley (1836 – 28 June 1914) was a successful financial entrepreneur and an Irish politician and Member of Parliament for Galway Connemara from 1885 to 1895.

Son of Patrick Foley, of Sligo, he was born in Leeds and educated at Catholic schools in Prescot and Leeds. In 1864 he founded the Pearl Life Assurance Loan and Investment Company Ltd, renamed the Pearl Life Assurance Company in 1874, and was later President. He was also chairman of the Industrial Assurances Protection Association and president of the National Amalgamated Approved Society founded in 1912.

He was elected unopposed as MP for Galway Connemara in 1885 and 1886. When the Irish Parliamentary Party split in December 1890 over the leadership of Charles Stewart Parnell, Foley sided with the Anti-Parnellite Irish National Federation. At the 1892 general election he was challenged by a Parnellite, J. H. Joyce. However, he retained the seat easily, by 2,637 votes to 598.

Foley was secretary of the Irish National League of Great Britain.

He married, in 1862, a daughter of John Lawrence, of Liverpool.

There is a statue to Foley on the front of the Pearl Chambers building on the Headrow in Leeds.

== Sources ==
- Brian M. Walker, ed. (1978). Parliamentary Election Results in Ireland, 1801-1922. Dublin: Royal Irish Academy.

Parliament of the United Kingdom
New constituency	MP for Galway Connemara; 1885–1895	Succeeded by William O'Malley
