= Community foundation =

Pooled donations for improvement of a local society

Community foundations (CFs) are instruments of civil society designed to pool donations into a coordinated investment and grant making facility dedicated primarily to the social improvement of a given place. Community foundations are a global phenomenon with 1700 existing around the world, of which over 700 are in the United States. Private foundations are typically endowed by an individual or a single family.

== Operation ==
Community foundations are independent registered philanthropic institutions serving geographically defined territory, typically a city or administrative area (county, region and the like). The six main characteristics of the CFs are:

1. Act as grant-making foundations – e.g. give grants to support development projects
2. Their mission broadly defined – e.g. to improve quality of life in a community
3. Serve geographically defined communities – a city, state, region, district or province
4. Are supported by a broad range of private as well as public donors and seek philanthropic contributions primarily from inside the community
5. Are governed by multi-sectoral, local boards reflecting the community
6. Build capital endowment, which is an important element of sustainability

It is a combination of all these basic characteristics what makes true CF, although there are many other types of community organizations that have some of these characteristics.

Families, individuals, businesses, and nonprofit groups establish funds within community foundations into which they can contribute a variety of assets to be used for charitable purposes. The people or organizations that establish the funds can then recommend that grants be distributed, in the name of the fund or anonymously, to qualified nonprofit groups and schools. In the USA the donor receives a charitable tax deduction in the year that gifts are made into their funds, but not all countries where community foundations currently operate provide such incentives for donors. Increasingly, community foundations are hosting giving circles as a way to further support giving in their communities.

The assets of community foundations are pooled and invested, with donors typically having a choice of investment products.

The funds established at community foundations can be non-endowed or expendable funds (i.e., the corpus of the fund can be spent in its entirety) or they can be endowed, which limit distributions to the interest earned on the assets and/or the amount granted by the foundation as long as the corpus is not spent. Endowments last in perpetuity due to the corpus never being able to be spent.

== History ==
The first community foundation was set up in Cleveland in 1914 by Frederick Goff and operates now as The Cleveland Foundation. Others soon followed including the California Community Foundation and the Chicago Community Trust. The first Community Foundation in Canada, The Winnipeg Foundation, was established in Winnipeg in 1921.

Since the 1980s, a number of private foundations in the United States have created initiatives to develop community foundations in various states. One of the earliest such initiatives was in Michigan. In Indiana, the Lilly Endowment funded a program that has spurred development of community foundations in each of the state's 92 counties. On a smaller scale, the Grand Victoria Foundation supports development of Illinois community foundations. The Kansas Health Foundation operates a similar program in Kansas communities.

== Notable examples ==
=== Canada ===
There over 200 community foundations in Canada as of 2026, accessible to more than 90% of Canadian communities. That resulted in the Community Foundations of Canada network.

=== United States ===
According to the latest data available, from October 2014, on the Foundation Center website, the top five largest community foundations, by assets, were:

Rank	Name	Total Giving	Assets	Gifts Received
1	Silicon Valley Community Foundation	$956,834,000	$6,529,547,000	$1,970,996,000
2	Tulsa Community Foundation	$130,381,000	$4,015,187,000	$298,907,000
3	The New York Community Trust	$157,785,699	$2,570,966,941	$184,255,136
4	Greater Kansas City Community Foundation	$263,297,742	$2,401,067,229	$391,353,262
5	Chicago Community Trust	$170,984,481	$2,290,734,371	$200,798,791

Statistics made available by the Foundation Center enable also financial comparison of the largest community foundations with the largest corporate and private foundations and illustrate the fact that community foundations in the United States tend to be larger than corporate foundations in both assets and grants given.

=== United Kingdom ===
There are 46 Community Foundations in the UK and UK Community Foundations (formerly the Community Foundation Network) acts as an umbrella organisation for some of them.

== Publications ==
- Bernholz. L., K. Fulton, and G. Kasper. (2005). "On the brink of new promise: The future of U.S. community foundations." Trade report. Funded by Charles S. Mott Foundation and the Ford Foundation.
- Gast, E. (2006). Community foundation handbook: What you need to know. New York: Council on Foundations.
- Hall, P.D. (1989). "The community foundation in America, 1914-1987." In Richard Magat, ed., Philanthropic Giving. New York: Oxford University Press.
- Hammack, D. (1989). "Community foundations: The delicate question of purpose," in Magat, R., ed. An agile servant: Community leadership by community foundations. New York: The Foundation Center.
- Magat, R., ed. (1989). An agile servant: Community leadership by community foundations. New York: The Foundation Center.
