= Edward Maloney =

American politician

Member of the Illinois Senate from the 18th district
- In office January 8, 2003 – January 9, 2013
- Preceded by: Patrick O'Malley
- Succeeded by: Bill Cunningham

Personal details
- Born: May 22, 1946 (age 80) Evergreen Park, Illinois
- Party: Democratic
- Spouse: Norine Maloney
- Children: Four sons
- Education: Lewis University, B.A. Chicago State University, M.Ed
- Profession: Educator

Edward D. Maloney (born May 22, 1946) is a former Democratic member of the Illinois Senate, representing the 18th district from 2003 to 2013.

== Early life ==
Maloney earned his undergraduate degree in political science from Lewis University and went on to receive his master's degree in education from Chicago State University.

== Public service ==
Maloney was an assistant principal and dean of faculty at Brother Rice High School in Chicago, Illinois. He spent 28 years as a teacher, guidance counselor, administrator and coach at Oak Lawn Community High School. Maloney was also an Area Manager and Director of Professional Development for the Chicago Park District for four years.

As a teacher and administrator, Maloney's professional memberships have included the Illinois Principals Association, the National Council for Social Studies, the Illinois Association of College Admissions Counselors, the Southwest Suburban Counselors' Association and a current member of the Illinois Federation of Teachers Local #943.

== Senate career ==
Maloney was elected as state senator in 2003. He had previously served briefly in the Illinois House of Representatives, for about four months in 1992-3.

His top legislative priorities as a senator were to provide better educational opportunities for Illinois students, combating childhood diseases and providing financial relief to senior citizens.

Maloney helped pass a law which would punish teachers and administrators who conceal their criminal past. The teaching certificate of the offender can be suspended or revoked following the discovery of the omitted information. Another law, Maloney worked on allows non-traditional students who attend Illinois public universities to have a greater say in their academic destinies by allowing them a seat on the Illinois Board of Education. Non-traditional students are generally 25 years of age or older, employed on a full-time basis, and/or a parent.

Maloney served as the Vice-Chairman of the Labor and Commerce Committee; he was also a member of the Revenue and the Appropriations Committee.

== Personal life ==
Maloney and his wife, Norine, have four sons: Brian, Matt, Dan, and Marty.
