= Mary O'Malley =

Mary O'Malley may refer to:

- Mary O'Malley (author), American author and public speaker
- Mary O'Malley (director) (1918–2006), Irish theatre director
- Mary O'Malley (playwright) (1941–2020), English playwright
- Mary O'Malley (poet) (born 1954), Irish poet
