= John na Seoltadh Ó Máille =

Irish sailor

John na Seoltadh Ó Máille, Gaelic-Irish Lord and sailor, fl. 1568.

John na Seoltadh was a son of Donnell Ó Máille of Ui Mail, the Ó Máille lordship based around Clew Bay. He was a kinsman of Grace O'Malley though in an unknown degree. Grace did have a brother or half-brother called Dónal na Piopa Ó Máille who was acknowledged as a son of her father, Eoghan Dubhdara Ó Máille.

The main source for John is an entry in the Annals of the Four Masters, sub anno 1568.

A hosting was made by James, the son of Maurice, son of John, son of the Earl, about Lammas, against Mac Maurice of Kerry, i.e. against Thomas, the son of Edmond. This James was commander of the Geraldines in the stead of the sons of James, son of John, who had been kept in captivity in London for a year previous to that time. The country was soon plundered, devastated, burned, and totally ravaged by James and his forces. The greater part of the inhabitants of the country fled, carrying with them to Lec-Snamha as much of their cattle as they were able. James had so numerous an army that he pitched two very extensive camps on both sides of this town. He placed O'Conor Kerry and the Clann-Sheehy, with their battalions, and a proportionate number of the gentlemen and chiefs of the army along with them, at the eastern side of the town; and he himself went, with that portion of the army which he wished to accompany him, to the west side of the town, so that Mac Maurice and his people were in great jeopardy between them. Intense heat of the air, sultriness and parching drought, also prevailed (as was natural at that season), so that their people and cattle were obliged to drink the brackish water of the river, in consequence of the intensity of their drought and the oppressiveness of their thirst. Edmond, the son of Gilla-Duv, son of Conor, son of Donough, son of Donnell-na-madhman Mac Sweeny, was constable to Mac Maurice at this time; and he had with him only a small party of gallowglasses of his followers, scarcely fifty men, the time of their service being expired. However, they did not think it honourable to depart from Mac Maurice, as this danger had overtaken him.

There happened also to be in the town at this time one John-na-Seoltadh, son of Donnell O'Malley, with the crew of a long ship, who, being friends to the fleet of Mac Maurice, had come to visit him without visitation or engagement, and did not think it becoming to desert him on that occasion. Mac Maurice consulted with those chieftains, to know what he should do. They answered and said unto him with one accord:‘ In our present situation our life is next to death, and it is not relief we shall receive by the consent of those who are opposed to us, and who are besieging us; and, as it is not thy wish to give hostages to the son of Maurice, the son of the Earl, what thou shouldst do is, to resign thy luck and prosperity to fate and fortune this day, and take for thy portion of Ireland till night what shall be under the feet of thine enemies, and let us attack the Clann-Sheehy, for against them our enmity and indignation are greatest.’ This resolution being agreed to, they rose up quickly with one accord, and Mac Maurice placed in order and array of battle the small body of friendly forces that he had with him, and the Clann-Sweeny were placed in the van to make the onset.

No wealth or principality was, they thought, more agreeable to the Clann-Sheehy, and all those who were about them, than to see them approach in this order, for they had rather subdue them on the spot as they thought they could, than to remain awaiting them any longer, eating, as they had been, the green grain from the blade of corn, and drinking cold water. As for Mac Maurice and his people, they deviated not from the common road until they came up with the Clann-Sheehy; and then it was that both parties made trial of the temper of their sharp spears, the strength of their battle-axes, the keenness of their swords, and the hardness of their helmets; and after having thus fought for some time, the fine army of the Geraldines were worsted, and took to flight, and turned their backs from maintaining the field of battle. They were vehemently and swiftly pursued by the people of Mac Maurice of Kerry, who proceeded to wound and slaughter them; so that it would not be easy to reckon or enumerate all of the Geraldines and of the Clann-Sheehy that fell in this defeat.

John is not listed among the casualties of the incident, but his ultimate fate is unknown.
