= Corps of Volunteer Nurses of the Sovereign Military Order of Malta =

Auxiliary unit of the Italian Army

The Corps of Volunteer Nurses of the Association of Italian Knights of the Sovereign Military Order of Malta (Italian: Corpo delle infermiere volontarie dell'ACISMOM) is an exclusively female unit of the Military Corps of the ACISMOM, and an auxiliary unit of the Italian Army.

The unit was formed in 1940 and was made up of a director and 40 nurses who were ladies of the Sovereign Military Order of Malta.

Currently, unlike the Corpo delle infermiere volontarie della Croce Rossa Italiana, the volunteers are recruited exclusively from state qualified nurses.

In the Codice dell'ordinamento militare issued in 2010, the law of 26 October 1952, n. 1785 (published in the Official Gazette No. 281 of 4 December 1952) which had established the Corps of Volunteer Nurses, with the task of "ensuring, in times of peace, war or of serious international crisis, the functioning of the services provided by the Association of Italian Knights of the Sovereign Military Order of Malta in cooperation with the health services of the State", which equated the volunteer nurses with the rank of Second lieutenant.

== See also ==
- Malteser International
- Direzione generale della sanità militare
- Servizio di sanità militare
- Corpo italiano di soccorso dell'Ordine di Malta
