= Kate O'Malley =

Kate O'Malley may refer to:

- Kathleen M. O'Malley (born 1956), United States federal judge
- Katie O'Malley (born 1962), Maryland state court judge, and first lady of Maryland
- Kate O'Malley, a British actress active in the 1990s who was a regular on the last two seasons of Soldier Soldier
- Kate O'Malley, a fictional character on the CBS show Queens Supreme, portrayed by Sarah Wayne Callies
