= David Edwardes =

English anatomist

David Edguard or Edwardes (fl. 1529 - 1532) was an English anatomist.

== Life ==
Edwardes was educated first at Oxford and afterwards at Cambridge. He took an M.D. at Cambridge in 1529.

== Works ==
He published two short works:

- 'De Indiciis et Præcognitionibus,’ London 1532, dedicated to Henry Fitzroy, Duke of Richmond, by 'medicus suus.'
- 'Introductio ad Anatomicen' (same place and date), dedicated to Henry Howard, Earl of Surrey. In the preface to this pamphlet Edguard promised a complete manual of anatomy, illustrated by the opinions of all the most learned men, but apparently he did not live to carry out his intention. Both works are dated from Cambridge 12 January 1532.
