= Charles Donald O'Malley =

American historian of medicine (1907–1970)

- Born: April 1, 1907; Alameda, California
- Died: April 6, 1970 (aged 63); Los Angeles, California
- Occupations: Historian of medicine and Latinist
- Known for: Andreas Vesalius of Brussels, 1514–1564
- Awards: Guggenheim Fellowship (1952); Pfizer Award (1965); Commonwealth Club of California Silver Medal (1965); Baie Award (1969)

Academic background
- Education: Stanford University (BA 1928; MA 1929; PhD 1945)
- Thesis: Jacopo Acontio: His Life, Thought, and Influence

Academic work
- Discipline: History of medicine
- Sub-discipline: Renaissance; Anatomy
- Institutions: Stanford University (1946–1959); University of California, Los Angeles (1959–1970)

Charles Donald O'Malley (April 1, 1907 – April 6, 1970) was an American historian of medicine and Latinist, recognized as a leading expert on the medicine of the Renaissance and, in particular, the life and work of the Renaissance anatomist Andreas Vesalius. He taught at Stanford University and at the University of California, Los Angeles. O'Malley was the president of the History of Science Society for a two-year term from 1967 to 1968 and of the International Academy of the History of Medicine from 1967 until his death.

== Early life and education ==
Charles Donald O'Malley was born in Alameda, California on April 1, 1907 as a third-generation Californian. In 1924 he matriculated at Stanford University, where he graduated with a bachelor's degree in 1928 and an M.A. in 1929. From 1929 to 1943 he taught history and Latin at South San Francisco High School. He continued advanced studies in his spare time, publishing his first book in 1942, a translation of a work in Italian by jurist, philosopher, and engineer Jacopo Aconcio, with the translated title Of the Things That Have to Be Observed and Taken into Account in the Reading of Histories.

In 1943 he returned to Stanford University as a doctoral student and graduated with a Ph.D. in 1945 with a dissertation on Jacopo Aconcio titled Jacopo Acontio: His Life, Thought, and Influence. His first published article, "Some Material on the Death of Edward Gibbon" (Bulletin of the History of Medicine, February 1943), sparked a long-term correspondence with Yale University historian of medicine John F. Fulton. In this time he also co-authored his first article on Renaissance Dutch anatomist Andreas Vesalius, "Vesalius as a clinician" (Bulletin of the History of Medicine, December 1943), and thus began a long series of collaborations with University of California, Berkeley professor of anatomy and medical history John Bertrand deCusance Morant Saunders (1903–1991).

In 1939 he married Dr. Frances M. Keddie, a dermatologist and dermatological researcher who had been working with J. B. deC. M. Saunders.

== Career ==
Upon completing his Ph.D., in 1946 O'Malley joined Stanford University's history department as an associate professor and the department's general expert on Renaissance history. He served as director of Stanford's Lane Medical Library's historical collection 1949–1959 and rose to the rank of full professor in 1951. He was a Guggenheim Fellow for the academic year 1952–1953. He and J. B. deC. M. Saunders continued their collaboration to publish extensively on Vesalius, Leonardo da Vinci, Gabriele Falloppio, Michael Servetus, and other Renaissance anatomists. In addition to his work on already-famous figures, O'Malley also published noteworthy research on then-less-celebrated figures such as the Spanish anatomists Andrés Laguna, Pedro Jimeno, and Bernardino Montaña de Monserrate. O'Malley was the author or co-author of papers published in the Bulletin of the History of Medicine, the Journal of the History of Medicine and Allied Sciences, Medical History, and several other journals. By 1958 O'Malley had published more than 20 papers directly or indirectly dealing with the life and work of Vesalius.

In the 1950s Franklin David Murphy, as the chancellor of the University of Kansas at Lawrence, unsuccessfully attempted to recruit O'Malley to become a professor at Lawrence. In 1960 Murphy was appointed the chancellor of UCLA, as well as a professor of medical history.

For the academic year 1959–1960 O'Malley was a visiting professor at the University of California, Los Angeles (UCLA) and in 1960 he became a tenured, full professor in UCLA's division of medical history in the department of anatomy at UCLA. During the 1960s chancellor Murphy and O'Malley worked together productively. With O'Malley's help, Murphy persuaded the directors of the Wellcome Trust to donate 30,000 objects from the Wellcome Ethnological Collection in London to assist the founding of a new UCLA campus museum in 1963; the new museum was originally named the "Laboratory of Ethnic Arts and Technology" and is now the Fowler Museum of Cultural History.

In 1964, O'Malley completed his biography of Vesalius, Andreas Vesalius of Brussels, 1514–1564, to immediate acclaim, receiving the 1965 Pfizer Award for an outstanding work in the history of science. This long work had involved O'Malley in sustained collaborations with J. B. deC. M. Saunders, John F. Fulton, and British physician and historian of medicine Charles Singer; Fulton and Singer had themselves been interested in Vesalius by Canadian physician and medical history collector William Osler and were enabled by library collection work done by Harvey Cushing at Osler's earlier suggestion. O'Malley had also collected new sources on Vesalius himself, for instance the letters of Venetian ambassador to the Habsburg court Bernardo Navagero, who knew Vesalius and mentioned him often in his letters.

O'Malley was promoted in 1966 to be the head of UCLA's newly created department of medical history, a position which he retained until his sudden death. He lectured at many American universities and also in Britain, Germany, Italy, Belgium, and Canada. During the 1950s and 1960s he corresponded extensively with leading medical historians such as John F. Fulton, F. N. L. Poynter, and Charles Singer.

O'Malley was one of the founding members at the first formal meeting in 1964 of the International Academy of the History of Medicine and was the academy's president from 1967 until his death. He was the president of the History of Science Society for a two-year term from 1967 to 1968. He was editor of the journal Clio Medica at the time of his death.

== Awards and honors ==
In 1956 O'Malley was elected a fellow of the American Association for the Advancement of Science. He was an honorary or corresponding member of the Royal Society of Medicine, the Worshipful Society of Apothecaries (London), and several other prestigious societies concerned with the history of medicine. In 1965 he received the History of Science Society's Pfizer Award and the Commonwealth Club of California's silver medal. In 1969 he received the Baie Award from the government of Belgium's Antwerp Province. As a posthumous honor, UCLA established the Charles Donald O'Malley Short-Term Research Fellowships.

== Selected publications ==
=== Articles ===
- O'Malley, C. D. (1943). "Some Material on the Death of Edward Gibbon". Bulletin of the History of Medicine. 13 (2): 200–209. JSTOR 44442782.
- O'Malley, C. D.; Saunders, J. B. deC. M. (1943). "Vesalius as a Clinician". Bulletin of the History of Medicine. 14 (5): 594–608. JSTOR 44440883.
- O'Malley, C. Donald (1954). "Andreas Vesalius' Pilgrimage". Isis. 45 (2): 138–144. doi:10.1086/348311.
- O'Malley, C. Donald (1967). "The Elmer Belt Library of Vinciana". JAMA: The Journal of the American Medical Association. 200 (1): 35–38. doi:10.1001/jama.1967.03120140093014. PMID 5342401. (See Elmer Belt Library of Vinciana.)
- O'Malley, C. D. (1968). "Tudor Medicine and Biology". Huntington Library Quarterly. 32 (1): 1–27. doi:10.2307/3816834. JSTOR 3816834. PMID 19928329.
- O'Malley, C. D. (1971). "Desiderius Erasmus". JAMA. 216: 66. doi:10.1001/jama.1971.03180270032004. (See Erasmus.)

=== Books and monographs ===
- O'Malley, Charles Donald (1945). Jacopo Acontio: His Life, Thought and Influence. Stanford University; 738 pages, Ph.D. thesis
- Saunders, John B. deC. M.; O'Malley, Charles Donald, eds. (22 October 2013). Andreas Vesalius Bruxellensis: The Bloodletting Letter of 1539: An Annotated Translation and Study of the Evolution of Vesalius's Scientific Development. Butterworth-Heinemann. ISBN 978-1-4831-9456-1; 94 pages; 1947 1st edition. New York: Henry Schuman.
- Vesalius, Andreas; O'Malley, Charles Donald (January 1973). The Illustrations from the Works of Andreas Vesalius of Brussels: With Annotations and Translations, a Discussion of the Plates and Their Background, Authorship and Influence, and a Biographical Sketch of Vesalius. Courier Corporation. ISBN 978-0-486-20968-5; illustrated; 248 pages; translated and annotated by John B. deC. M. Saunders and Charles D. O'Malley; 1950 1st edition. Cleveland, Ohio: World Publishing Company.
- Leonardo Da Vinci on the Human Body: The Anatomical, Physiological, and Embryological Drawings of Leonardo Da Vinci: with Translations, Emendations and a Biographical Introduction. Henry Schuman. 1952. LCCN 52004858; illustrated; 506 pages; translated and edited by Charles Donald O'Malley and John B. deC. M. Saunders; 1983 Dover reprint. Courier Corporation. January 1983. ISBN 978-0-486-24483-9.
- The Controversy on the Comets of 1618: Galileo Galilei, Horatio Grassi, Mario Guiducci, Johann Kepler. University of Pennsylvania Press. 11 November 2016. ISBN 978-1-5128-0145-3; 408 pages; translated by Stillman Drake and C. D. O'Malley; 1960 1st edition. LCCN 59010458; illustrated; xxv+380 pages
- Lectures on the whole of anatomy. Berkeley, California: University of California Press. 1961. LCCN 61016879; an annotated translation of William Harvey's Prelectiones anatomiae universalis; illustrated; 239 pages; translated and annotated by C.D. O'Malley, F.N.L. Poynter, and K.F. Russell
- Introduction to anatomy, 1532, a facsimile reproduction. Stanford University Press. 1961. LCCN 61065870; English and Latin text of In anatomicen introductio luculenta et brevis by David Edguard; 64 pages; English translation and an introductory essay on anatomical studies in Tudor England by Charles Donald O'Malley and Kenneth Fitzpatrick Russell
- On the burning of his library, and On medical travel by Bartholin Thomas. University of Kansas, Publications, Library series, no. 9. Lawrence, Kansas: University of Kansas Libraries. 1961. LCCN 60063354; viii+101 pages; translated by Charles D. O'Malley
- O'Malley, Charles Donald (1962). Early Concepts of the Anthropomorpha; 64 pages
- O'Malley, Charles Donald (1964). Andreas Vesalius of Brussels, 1514–1564. Berkeley California: University of California Press; 480 pages
- Clarke, Edwin; O'Malley, Charles Donald (1996). The Human Brain and Spinal Cord: A Historical Study Illustrated by Writings from Antiquity to the Twentieth Century (2nd, revised ed.). Norman. ISBN 978-0-930405-25-0; 951 pages; 1st edition. Berkeley, California: University of California Press. 1968. LCCN 68011275; illustrated; xiii+926 pages
- O'Malley, C. D., ed. (1969). Leonardo's Legacy: An International Symposium. UCLA Center for Medieval and Renaissance Studies. Publication no. 2. University of California Press. LCCN 68014976; illustrated; viii+245 pages
- O'Malley, C. D., ed. (28 April 2023). The History of Medical Education: An International Symposium Held February 5–9, 1968. University of California Press. ISBN 978-0-520-31344-6. 1st edition 1970. LCCN 72085449; xii+548 pages
