= Mary Ní Mháille =

Mary Ní Mháille (died 1525) Gaelic-Irish Lady.

Ní Mháille was a daughter of The Ó Máille, and a descendant of Maille mac Conall, from whom the clan took their surname. She became the wife of Mac Suibhne Fánad, and upon her death was noted as the best wife of a constable in her time.

Among her children was Mary Ní Suibhne Fanad, who married The Ó Baoighill (O'Boyle). In 1532, she died suddenly, after having been thrown from her horse, at the door of her own mansion, on the 21st of April.
