= Ed O'Malley =

American politician

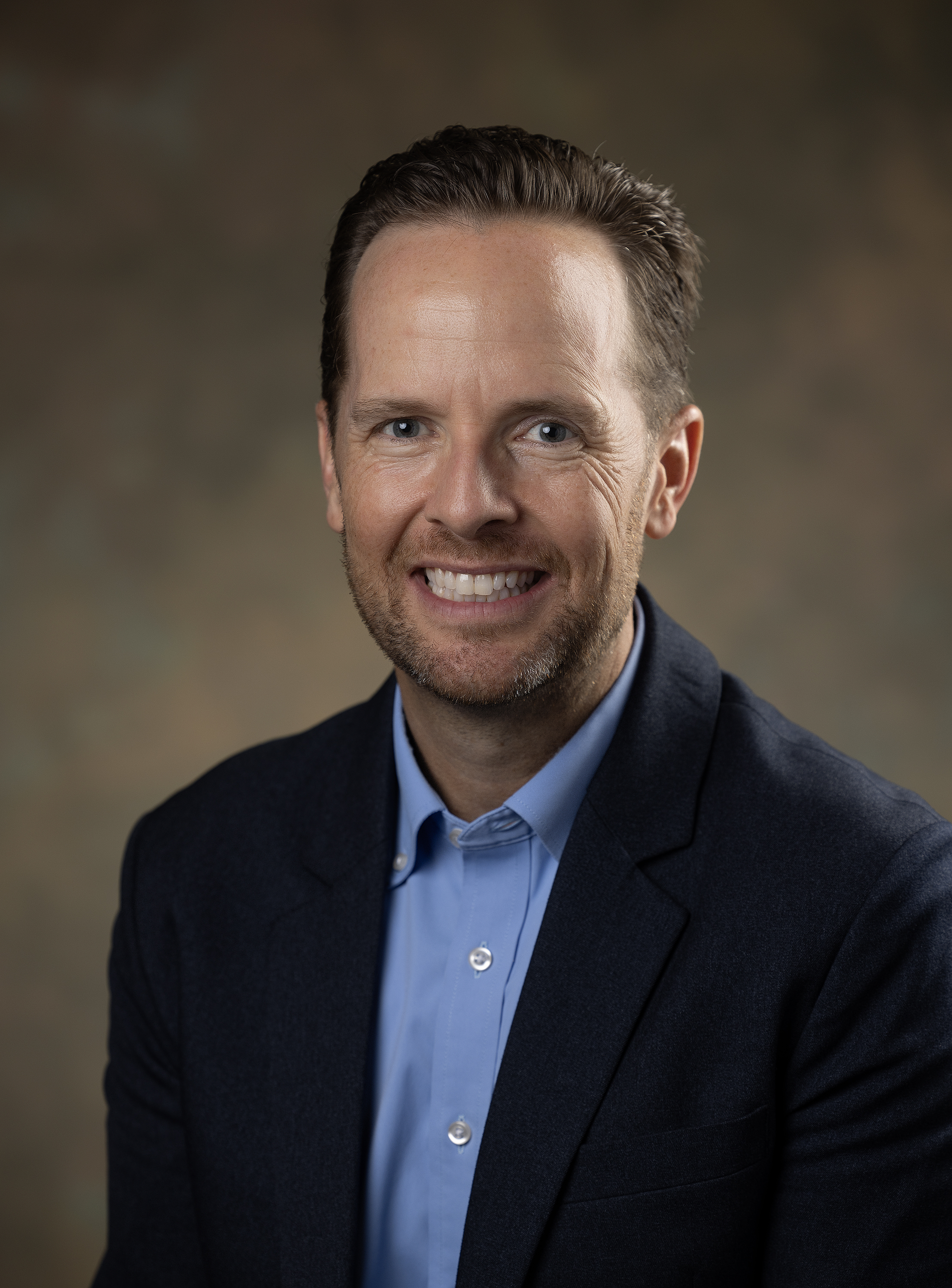

Member of the Kansas House of Representatives from the 24th district
- In office January 13, 2003 – January 8, 2007
- Preceded by: Robert Tomlinson
- Succeeded by: Ronnie Metsker

Personal details
- Born: January 26, 1975 (age 51) Kansas City, Missouri, U.S.
- Party: Republican
- Spouse: Joanna O'Malley
- Children: 3
- Education: Kansas State University
- Occupation: President and CEO of the Kansas Health Foundation
- Website: Campaign website

Edward J. O'Malley Jr. (born January 26, 1975) is an American non-profit executive, author, and politician. A former member of the Kansas House of Representatives, he is the current CEO and President of the Kansas Health Foundation.

== Early life and education ==
O’Malley grew up in Johnson County, Kansas. He graduated from Shawnee Mission South High School in Overland Park, KS and worked his way through college at Kansas State University, earning a Bachelors of Arts degree in history.

Later in life, O'Malley completed the U.S. Small Business Administration's Emerging Leaders Streetwise MBA program, and executive training from the Harvard Business School and Harvard's John F. Kennedy School of Government.

== Public service ==
O’Malley began his career as an aide to Kansas Governor Bill Graves and as a staff member for the Overland Park Chamber of Commerce. He was appointed to the Kansas House of Representatives in 2003, where he represented the 24th District, after the incumbent State Representative, Robert Tomlinson, was appointed Assistant Insurance Commissioner. O'Malley was re-elected, and served until 2006. In the Kansas Legislature, he served on committees for economic development, financial institutions, taxation and transportation.

In January 2007, O’Malley became the founding president and CEO of the Kansas Leadership Center (KLC), a leadership-mentoring organization funded by the Kansas Health Foundation, and headquartered in Wichita, Kansas. The Center provided leadership training to civic activists, and O'Malley guided the nonpartisan Center towards promoting consensus decision-making, rather than traditional "command-and-control" decision models.

Taking a leave of absence from his post at the KLC, O'Malley announced, on January 12, 2017, his exploratory candidacy for Governor of Kansas in the 2018 election. Positioning himself as a political centrist, advocating bipartisan policy collaboration, O'Malley formally launched his candidacy on October 10, 2017—a late entrant in a crowded field of Republican gubernatorial candidates that included incumbent Governor Jeff Colyer, Kansas Secretary of State Kris Kobach, Kansas Insurance Commissioner Ken Selzer, former state senator Jim Barnett, former state representative Mark Hutton, Wichita businessman Wink Hartman, and three high school students.

Except for the high school students, all of his opponents raised much more money than O'Malley, whose $220,000, raised by February 2018, was eclipsed by other opponents' reported campaign funds ranging from $350,000 to $1,800,000. O'Malley withdrew from the race February 1, 2018, conceding his campaign lacked enough money to win in both the primary and general elections.

O'Malley returned to work at the KLC, until August 2022, when he became the president and CEO of the KLC's primary funder, the Kansas Health Foundation (KHF), a private philanthropy headquartered in Wichita, Kansas, which advocates for improved public health.

O'Malley has also served as the board chair of the Boys and Girls Club of South Central Kansas, on an advisory committee for the Colorado Health Foundation, as Vice Chair for Inclusion & Diversity of the Wichita Regional Chamber of Commerce, as a director for the Beta Theta Pi National Fraternity, and as a youth sports coach.

== Author ==
- For the Common Good: Redefining Civic Leadership (co-authored with David C. Chrislip)
- Your Leadership Edge: Lead Anytime, Anywhere (co-authored with Amanda Cebula)
- What's Right With Kansas
- When Everyone Leads (co-authored with Julia Fabris McBride)
