= Patrick O'Malley (American politician) =

American politician

Member of the Illinois Senate from the 18th district
- In office 1993–2003
- Preceded by: Redistricting
- Succeeded by: Edward Maloney

Personal details
- Born: October 22, 1950 (age 75)
- Party: Republican
- Spouse: Mary Judith
- Children: 2
- Education: Purdue University; John Marshall Law School

Patrick O'Malley (born October 22, 1950) is a former Illinois State Senator and gubernatorial candidate who served as an elected member of the board of trustees and Chairman of the Finance Committee for Moraine Valley Community College from 1989 to 1992.

== Personal history ==
O'Malley is a 1968 graduate of Marist High School. O'Malley has a bachelor's degree in economics and a master's degree in finance from Purdue University, as well as a Juris Doctor from John Marshall Law School. O'Malley currently resides in Palos Park, Illinois with his wife Mary Judith, they have two adult children; Brigid and Patrick. His uncle-in-law is former congressman Morgan Murphy.

== Illinois State Senate ==
In the 1992 general election, O'Malley ran for the Illinois Senate against Democratic candidate John J. McNamara, a four-term member of the Illinois House of Representatives, in the Republican-leaning 18th district. In a race identified by political observers as one of four potential toss-up races that cycle, O'Malley defeated McNamara. O'Malley, with 50,303 votes, defeated McNamara, with 36,391 votes, by a margin of sixteen points.

Patrick O'Malley served as a Republican member of the Illinois State Senate representing the 18th district from 1993 to 2003. While State Senator he was a member of a group of conservative state senators elected in 1992 who often challenged the leadership of the Illinois Republican Party; the group also included Peter Fitzgerald, Dave Syverson, Steve Rauschenberger and Chris Lauzen. As State Senator O'Malley served as Chairman of the Senate Financial Institutions Committee; Vice chairman of the Senate Education Committee; member of the Senate Insurance and Pensions Committee; and member of the Senate Judiciary Committee.

== Gubernatorial campaign ==
Patrick O'Malley ran for governor in 2002 on a conservative platform and described himself as a "Pro-life Catholic", and "Reagan conservative". O'Malley's self described political philosophy was "to take the principles of the Republican Party as I see them, limited government, low taxes, individual freedoms, and keeping free enterprise vibrant and strong". In Patrick O'Malley's run for governor he ran a notable ad meant to link his strongest opponent, Attorney General Jim Ryan to incumbent Governor George Ryan, in the ad Jim Ryan's face morphs into that of Governor George Ryan's with the voice over, "We know the truth about George Ryan, what about Jim"?. O'Malley came in second in the Republican primary with 253,217 votes, losing to Attorney General Jim Ryan.

== Electoral history ==
- 2002 Republican Gubernatorial Primary
  - Jim Ryan 45%
  - Patrick O'Malley 29%
  - Corinne Wood 27%

== See also ==
- Maille mac Conall
