= John J. O'Malley =

American architect

- Born: John Joseph O’Malley; November 19, 1915; Brooklyn, NY
- Died: March 20, 1970 (aged 54); Plandome, NY
- Education: Pratt Institute (April 22, 1941, Architectural Construction); Columbia University (May 28th, 1941. School of Engineering, Defense Training Course); Washington Irving High School (diploma 1946)
- Occupation: Architect
- Awards: Oil Painting, National Arts Club, 1945; 1st Prize Excellence of Design, Queens Chamber of Commerce: St. Elizabeth’s School, Woodhaven, NY, 1962; Cathedral College, 1968; St Robert Bellarmine Church, 1969; Chamber of Commerce borough of Queens, 1st prize 1st Prize of Excellence Design Award, St. Patrick’s Church, Huntington NY, Jury of LI Association, 1963; 1st Prize of Excellence of Design Award, St. Athanasius, Brooklyn, Brooklyn Real Estate Board, 1963
- Practice: John O'Malley & Associates
- Buildings: Cathedral College (Douglaston, NY); St. Patrick's Cathedral (Huntington, NY); American Martyrs (Bayside, NY)

John J. O’Malley (November 19, 1915 – March 20, 1970) was an American architect based in Brooklyn, NY, known primarily for his work as an architect for the Archdiocese of New York. He founded John O’Malley & Associates, which designed approximately twenty churches, thirty schools, and thirty other buildings for the Catholic Church. His firm designed more than 150 buildings during his career. O’Malley also designed public buildings and private residences.

== Early life ==
O'Malley was born in Brooklyn in 1915, where he lived all but two months of his life. Son of Irish immigrants, O'Malley was the middle child of three surviving children (two siblings died in early childhood before he was born). His parents, Thomas (b.1883) and Honor (née O'Brien, b.1880) were born in Galway, Ireland, but met in Brooklyn. His father was a sandhog, working on many projects in North and South America, including the Holland Tunnel in New York City.

"I could draw before I could write," he told Today's Family magazine. The article continues, "... as a schoolboy he found himself filling copy books with drawings which he loved to do. During high school he took evening courses to prepare for a career in art. At the age of 17 he spent the summer working in an architect's office, his first exposure to the profession, and "I got the bug then," he says simply."

He continued to work in related fields, including as an illustrator for the construction reference, the Thomas Registry, until finishing his education and starting his own architectural firm.

== Education ==
O'Malley studied Architecture Construction through the Fine and Applied Arts program at the Pratt Institute in Brooklyn and graduated in 1941. He followed that degree with coursework at Columbia University's School of Engineering, which certified him in Aeronautical Drafting through the Engineering Defense Training Course, also in 1941.

== Career ==
O'Malley was a member of the American Institute of Architects, the New York State Society of Architects, and the Mayor's Panel of Architects in the City of New York. In his firm's prospectus, O'Malley describes his Statement of Experience as follows: "The firm of JOHN O'MALLEY & ASSOCIATES, ARCHITECTS, was established in 1950. Experience includes complete architectural services of consultation, design budgeting, preliminary studies and planning, interior design, working drawings, the supervision of various classes of institutional buildings: colleges, school, faculty residences, child-care, geriatrics, churches, auditoriums, and government work. Qualified by the Department of Defense in Fallout Shelter Analysis pertaining to planning of public buildings." O'Malley obtained his license to practice architecture in 1938.

=== Representative list of projects ===
==== Colleges ====
Cathedral College, Douglaston, 1967

==== Churches ====
- Church of the American Martyrs, Bayside, 1968
- St. Robert Bellarmine, Bayside, 1969
- St. Aidan, Williston Park, 1961
- Sts. Simon and Jude, Bayside, NY
- St. Finbar, Brooklyn, NY
- St. Mary Mother of Jesus, Brooklyn, NY
- St. Michael, Flushing, NY
- St. Patrick, Huntington, NY
- St. Gabriel, Brooklyn, NY
- St. Athanasius, Brooklyn, NY
- St. Sylvester, Brooklyn, NY
- St. Francis de Sales, Manhattan, NY
- Assumption of the Blessed Virgin Mary, Centereach, NY
- Our Lady of Lourdes, West Islip, NY
- Assumption Church, Ntungano, (former) Tanganyika, East Africa

==== Chapels ====
- Holy Trinity Chapel, Whitestone, NY
- St. Paul Chapel, Corona, NY
- Our Lady of Hope Chapel, Middle Village, NY

==== Schools ====
- St. Nicholas High School, Brooklyn, NY, 1969
- St. Teresa, Staten Island, NY
- St. Bernard, Brooklyn, NY
- Blessed Sacrament, Jackson Heights, NY
- Our Lady of Hope, Middle Village, NY
- Holy Trinity, Whitestone, NY
- St Vincent Ferrer, Brooklyn, NY
- St. Vincent de Paul, Brooklyn, NY
- Presentation of the Blessed Virgin Mary, Jamaica, NY
- St. Rose of Lima, Rockaway, NY
- Holy Ghost, Brooklyn, NY
- St Raphael, Long Island City, NY
- St. Anthony of Padua, Brooklyn, NY
- St. Elizabeth, Woodhaven, NY
- St. Finbar, Brooklyn, NY
- St. Gabriel, Brooklyn, NY
- Queen of Angels, Sunnyside, NY
- St. Aidan, Williston Park, NY
- Holy Innocents, Brooklyn, NY
- St. Malachy, Brooklyn, NY
- Sts. Simon and Jude, Brooklyn, NY
- Our Lady of Angelus, Long Island City, NY
- St. John Evangelists, Centereach, NY
- Sts. Philip and James, St. James, NY
- Assumption, Center Moriches, NY
- St. Anne, Brentwood, NY

==== Faculty residences ====
- Sacred Hearts, Southampton, NY
- St. Teresa, Staten Island, NY
- St. Bernard, Brooklyn, NY
- Presentation, Jamaica, NY
- St. Camillus, Rockaway, NY
- Good Shepherd, Brooklyn, NY
- St. Michael, Flushing, NY
- Our Lady of the Angelus, Rego Park, NY
- St. Virgilius, Broad Channel, NY
- St. Patrick, Huntington, NY
- Sts. Simon and Jude, Brooklyn, NY
- St. Gerard Mjella, Hollis, NY

==== Auditoria ====
- St Gertrude's Church, Edgemere, NY, 1961
- Sacred Heart, Jersey City, NJ
- St. John Evangelists, Center Moriches, NY
- Sts. Philip and James, St. James, NY
- St. Joan of Arc, Jackson Heights, NY

==== Child-care and geriatric facilities ====
- St. Michael's Home, Staten Island, NY
- St. John's Child Care Center Rockaway, NY
- St. Benedict, Brooklyn, NY
- Little Sisters of the Poor, Brooklyn, NY

==== Community centers ====
- St. Paul the Apostle, Corona, NY
- St. Margaret Mary, Long Island City, NY
- St. Columba, Brooklyn, NY
- Holy Family, Staten Island, NY

==== Rectories ====
- Queen of Angels, Long Island City, NY
- St Raphael, Long Island City, NY
- St. Leo, Corona, NY
- St. Rose of Lima, Rockaway, NY
- St. Paul Apostle, Corona, NY
- St. Patrick, Huntington, NY
- Sts Simon and Jude, Brooklyn, NY
- St. Columba, Brooklyn, NY
- Our Lady of the Angelus, Rego Park, NY

==== Select other works ====
- US Post Office, Brooklyn, NY
- Classon Point Branch Library, Bronx, NY
- O'Malley residence, Plandome, NY
- O'Malley residence, Southampton, NY

== Awards ==
- Cathedral College, Architects' Jury, Queens Chamber of Commerce
- St. Elizabeth's School, Architects' Jury, Queens Chamber of Commerce
- St. Gertrude's Auditorium, Architects' Jury, Queens Chamber of Commerce
- St. Patrick's Church, Architects' Jury, Long Island Association
- St. Athanasius, Architects' Jury, Brooklyn Real Estate Board
- St. Finbar's Church, Architects' Jury, Brooklyn Real Estate Board
- American Martyrs Church, Architects' Jury, Queens Chamber of Commerce
- St. Robert Bellarmine Church, Architects' Jury, Queens Chamber of Commerce
- St. Margaret Community Center, Architects' Jury, Queens Chamber of Commerce
- St. Michael's Church, Architects' Jury, Queens Chamber of Commerce

=== Other ===
- Oil painting, National Arts Club, 1945

== Personal life ==
He married Eileen Moogan (1927-2006), an Irish immigrant from Westport, Ireland, on April 10, 1948. During his 22-year marriage, O'Malley was involved in raising his 14 children. In 1970, two months after moving from Brooklyn to a home he designed and constructed in Plandome, NY, O'Malley died from a heart attack at age 54. His youngest child was less than one year old. His children are John, Eileen, Patric, Clare, Therese, Joseph, Maura, Michael, Bryan, Brendan, James, Miriam, Neil, and Colm.
