= Peter O'Malley (footballer) =

New Zealand footballer

Personal information
- Full name: Peter W O'Malley
- Place of birth: New Zealand

Senior career*
Years	Team	Apps	(Gls)
- Technical Old Boys

International career
1947–1948	New Zealand	2	(0)
- * Club domestic league appearances and goals

Peter O'Malley is a former association football player who represented New Zealand at international level.

O'Malley made his full New Zealand debut in a 1–4 loss to South Africa on 19 July 1947 and played just one further official international, appearing in 0–7 loss to Australia on 28 August 1948.
