= Charles Conor O'Malley =

Irish surgeon, writer, and Chief of the Name

Charles Conor O'Malley, BSc, MB., DOMS, KM., was an Irish eye surgeon, writer, and Chief of the Name, 1889–1982.

O'Malley was born in Joyce County in Connemara, in County Galway, Ireland. He was a member of the Kilmilkin O'Malley family. He graduated in Medicine from University College Galway (UCG) in 1917. His first appointment was Surgeon Lt. on HMS Furious, and later with the Royal Air Force during World War I. He undertook postgraduate training in ophthalmology in Moorfields Hospital, London. In the 1920s he began his civilian medical practice in Gort, County Galway. In 1927 he visited to India where he studied the then novel method of intra-capsular cataract extraction cataracts under Dr Mathra Das Pawha at Moga Clinic in the Punjab. Dr O'Malley provided a report of 220 intra-capsular cataract operations he undertook when in Moga. This clinical audit was published in the British Journal of Ophthalmology in March 1931.

In 1931 he was appointed Professor of Ophthalmology and Otology in UCG in Galway. His elder brother Michael O'Malley was Professor of Surgery there from 1924 to 1956. His wife Sarah Joyce O'Malley was Consultant Anaesthetist in the hospital. He undertook clinical practice at the former Central Hospital, Galway (later termed the Regional Hospital Galway) and now known as University College Hospital Galway. The Sal and Conor O'Malley Prize is awarded annually to the undergraduate who attains the highest marks in ophthalmology at the summer MB Degree Examination at UCG.

O'Malley's professional publications in ophthalmology were written while he was at UCG. He undertook private practice from his consulting rooms at No 6, The Crescent, Galway and St Bride's Nursing, Sea Road, Galway.

O'Malley founded the first unit of the Order of Malta Ambulance Corps in Ireland in 1938 and later became a member of the Sovereign Military Order of Malta.

Conor and Sal O'Malley had three daughters (Grace O' Hara, Joan Ringrose and Ann Kelly). His two sons, Patrick O'Malley and Conor C. O'Malley (1930-2012), graduated in Medicine from UCG. Both became leading ophthalmologists in the USA and contributed technical developments in retinal surgery (O'Malley Xenon Photocoagulator) and vitreous surgery (Ocutome Vitrector). A grandson, Simon P Kelly (born 1956), also graduated in Medicine from UCG and is an Ophthalmic Surgeon and Retinal Specialist at the Royal Bolton Hospital, England. A nephew, Ronal E. O'Malley, also graduated in Medicine from UCG and is an Ophthalmic Surgeon and Retinal Specialist in Houston, Texas in the United States.

In his retirement, Conor O'Malley became absorbed in the history of the Ó Máille clan, and such of its figures as Grace O'Malley (c. 1530 – c. 1603). He was elected Chief of the O'Malley's, and became a Guardian Chief, a lifetime honour. His daughter Ann later served as Guardian Chief of the Clan.

O'Malley was a keen golfer and fresh water angler. In 1976 he published a book, With a Fishing Rod in Ireland.

== See also ==
- Sheila Mulloy

== Select bibliography ==
- With a Fishing Rod in Ireland, New York, 1975
