= Mary O'Malley (author) =

Mary L. O'Malley
- Occupations: Author, speaker, counselor
- Notable work: What's In the Way Is the Way: A Practical Guide for Waking Up to Life

Mary O’Malley is a speaker and the author of Belonging to Life: The Journey of Awakening, The Gift of Our Compulsions: a Revolutionary Approach to Self Acceptance and Healing, The Magical Forest of Awakening, and What's In the Way IS the Way. She is a certified counselor in the State of Washington in private practice in Kirkland, Washington. She leads groups, retreats, and classes throughout the United States and in Denmark.

== Biography ==
Mary O'Malley grew up in Washington State and attended Puget Sound University in Tacoma, Washington.

She was hospitalized in 1968 after a number of suicide attempts. She then spent a number of years studying with Patricia Sun, Stephen Levine, Jack Kornfield and Pema Chodron, Brian Swimme and Adyashanti. Since the early 1980s she has been writing books, speaking to groups, leading retreats and working with people individually.

Her philosophies bear some similarities to those of Stephen Levine, Eckhart Tolle and Byron Katie
