= Peter O'Malley (cricketer) =

New Zealand cricketer

Personal information
- Full name: Peter William O'Malley
- Born: 24 March 1927; Christchurch, New Zealand
- Died: 9 October 1997 (aged 70); Christchurch, New Zealand
- Batting: Right-handed
- Bowling: Slow left-arm orthodox
- Role: Batsman

Domestic team information
- Years: Team
- 1947/48–1954/55: Canterbury

Career statistics
Competition	First-class
Matches	17
Runs scored	945
Batting average	32.58
100s/50s	2/5
Top score	132*
Balls bowled	108
Wickets	1
Bowling average	71.00
5 wickets in innings	0
10 wickets in match	0
Best bowling	1/28
Catches/stumpings	9/–
- Source: Cricinfo, 28 December 2023

Peter William O'Malley (24 March 1927 – 9 October 1997) was a New Zealand cricketer. He played in 17 first-class matches for Canterbury from 1947 to 1955.

O'Malley had a successful first season in first-class cricket in 1947-48. In his first three innings, batting at number three, he scored 42, 91 and 67 for Canterbury in the Plunket Shield, on each occasion sharing a third-wicket century partnership with Brun Smith: 113, 129 and 159 respectively. He was chosen to represent the South Island against the North Island later in the season and scored 132 not out. The Cricket Almanack of New Zealand in 1948 described him as a "young batsman whose stroke execution is exceptionally good", and added that he was a brilliant fieldsman at cover point.

O'Malley was less successful in the next two seasons and returned to Christchurch club cricket until 1953-54 when he again played Plunket Shield cricket, scoring 102 as an opener against Auckland and putting on an opening partnership of 157 with Gordon Leggat.
