= William O'Malley (politician) =

Irish journalist and politician

Member of Parliament for Galway Connemara
- In office 1895–1918
- Preceded by: Patrick James Foley
- Succeeded by: Pádraic Ó Máille

Personal details
- Born: c. February 1853
- Died: 1939 (aged 85–86)

William O'Malley (circa February 1853 – September 1939) was an Irish journalist, sportsman, and politician. He was the Member of Parliament (MP) for Galway Connemara from 1895 to 1918.

== Life ==
O'Malley was born at Ballyconneely, near Clifden, Ireland. He was educated at the Model School, Galway and at St Mary's teacher training college, Hammersmith, London.

He was a journalist and business manager of newspapers. He married Mary O'Connor in 1886, becoming brother-in-law to T. P. O'Connor. She was a Nationalist activist, who spoke at Land League meetings in the 1880s and was imprisoned for six months. One of their sons was killed in action in the First World War.

At the 1895 general election, O'Malley stood for as an Anti-Parnellite Irish National Federation candidate to succeed Patrick James Foley the MP Galway Connemara in the House of Commons of the United Kingdom. He was elected unopposed, and was re-elected unopposed as a member of the Irish Parliamentary Party in 1900, 1906, and January and December 1910. He resided in England throughout his parliamentary career, returning to Ireland in 1921.

O'Malley criticised the ITGWU during the Dublin Lockout as engaging in "despotism", while describing Jim Larkin as a "wild egotistical fanatic". In 1918, standing again with the IPP, O'Malley lost to Pádraic Ó Máille of Sinn Féin, winning only 23% of the vote.

His involvement in dubious speculative business ventures was widely criticised.

He died in September 1939, aged 86.

== Publication ==
- William O'Malley, Glancing Back (memoirs), London, 1933

== Sources ==
- Patrick Maume, The Long Gestation: Irish Nationalist Life 1891-1918, Dublin, Gill & MacMillan, 1999

Parliament of the United Kingdom
Preceded by Patrick James Foley	Member of Parliament for Galway Connemara; 1895 – 1918	Succeeded by Pádraic Ó Máille
