= Charles O'Malley (Michigan) =

American politician

Charles O'Malley, Irish fur trader and urban founder, fl. 1834-43.

O'Malley was a native of County Mayo. He became a fur trader in Michigan, where he was "responsible for bringing a substancial number of Irish immigrants there in 1834." In 1843, O'Malley proposed Irish names for some Michigan counties, including Antrim, Clare, Emmet, Roscommon and Wexford counties.

O'Malley became a member of the Michigan state legislature in 1846, being re-elected in 1847 and 1849. In 1849 he was chosen Speaker pro tempore.
