= Pádraic Ó Máille =

Irish politician (1878–1946)

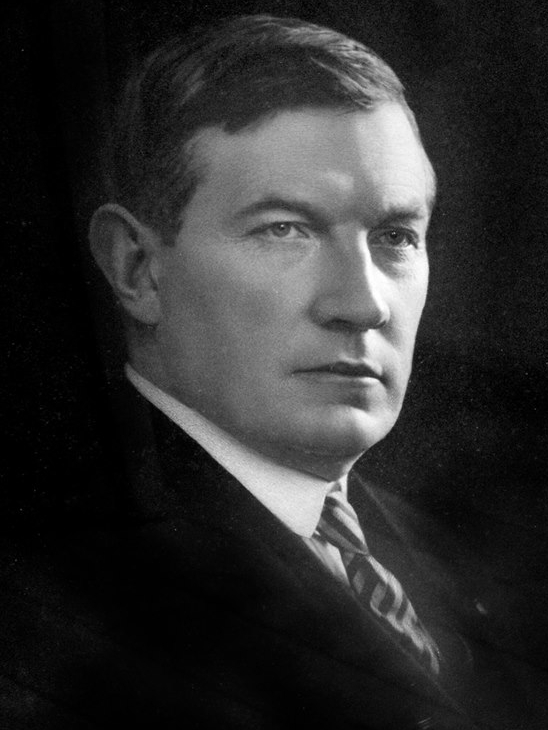
- Ó Máille, c. 1922

Leas-Cheann Comhairle of Dáil Éireann
- In office 6 December 1922 – 23 May 1927
- Ceann Comhairle: Michael Hayes
- Preceded by: Brian O'Higgins
- Succeeded by: James Dolan

Teachta Dála
- In office August 1923 – June 1927
- In office May 1921 – June 1922
- Constituency: Galway
- In office December 1918 – May 1921
- Constituency: Galway Connemara

Senator
- In office 7 September 1938 – 19 January 1946
- Constituency: Nominated by the Taoiseach
- In office 27 April 1938 – 7 September 1938
- Constituency: Agricultural Panel

Senator
- In office 12 December 1934 – 29 May 1936

Personal details
- Born: 23 February 1878 Kilmilkin, County Galway, Ireland
- Died: 19 January 1946 (aged 67)
- Party: Sinn Féin; Cumann na nGaedheal; Clann Éireann; Fianna Fáil

Military service
- Allegiance: Irish Republic
- Branch/service: Irish Volunteers; Irish National Army
- Battles/wars: Irish War of Independence; Irish Civil War

Pádraic Ó Máille (23 February 1878 – 19 January 1946) was an Irish politician. He was a founder member of Sinn Féin and of the Conradh na Gaeilge in Galway. He was a member of the Irish Volunteers from 1917 to 1921.

He was born in Kilmilkin, in Maam Valley in County Galway and was a farmer. He was elected as a Sinn Féin MP for Galway Connemara at the 1918 general election.

In January 1919, Sinn Féin MPs who had been elected in the Westminster elections of 1918 refused to recognise the Parliament of the United Kingdom and instead assembled at the Mansion House in Dublin as a revolutionary parliament called Dáil Éireann. He was re-elected as a Sinn Féin Teachta Dála (TD) for the Galway constituency at the 1921 elections.

He supported the Anglo-Irish Treaty and voted in favour of it. He was re-elected as a pro-Treaty Sinn Féin TD for Galway at the 1922 general election, and was elected as a Cumann na nGaedheal TD for Galway at the 1923 general election. In the subsequent Irish Civil War, he was targeted for assassination by anti-Treaty forces and was shot and badly wounded in Dublin in December 1922.

He was critical of the proposed Irish Boundary Commission and resigned from Cumann na nGaedheal and founded a new political party called Clann Éireann in 1926.

He lost his seat at the June 1927 general election and was unsuccessful at the September 1927 general election. He later joined Fianna Fáil (the party which had emerged from the anti-Treaty side in the civil war) and contested the 1932 general election for that party in the Dublin County constituency but was not elected.

On each of these occasions he was subjected to a smear campaign by his former party colleagues who used his pro-Treaty stance during the civil war against him. It was alleged that he had personally selected his fellow county man Liam Mellows for execution. These smears persisted despite denials from the Mellows family and from Ó Máille himself. In fact, Mellows was executed in reprisal for the attack on Ó Máille and Sean Hales in 1922. Mellows was shot the following day while Ó Máille himself was gravely wounded and in hospital.

He served as a Fianna Fáil Senator in Seanad Éireann from 1934 to 1936. He was re-elected to the new Seanad in 1938 on the Agricultural Panel. From 1939 until his death in 1946 he was re-appointed to the Seanad as a nominee of the Taoiseach Éamon de Valera. He was Leas-Chathaoirleach (deputy chairperson) of the Seanad from May to November 1938.

== Sources ==
- Richard Dunphy (1995), The Making of Fianna Fáil Power in Ireland: 1923–48
- Michael Ó Cuinneagáin (1996), On the Arm of Time

== Gallery ==
Prosecution of Patrick O'Malley MP; Firing Revolver At Police

British Army intelligence file for Patrick O'Malley

Parliament of the United Kingdom
Preceded by William O'Malley	Member of Parliament for Galway Connemara; 1918–1922	Constituency abolished
Oireachtas
New constituency	Teachta Dála for Galway Connemara; 1918–1921	Constituency abolished

Dáil	Election	Deputy (Party)	Deputy (Party)	Deputy (Party)	Deputy (Party)	Deputy (Party)	Deputy (Party)	Deputy (Party)	Deputy (Party)	Deputy (Party)
2nd	1921	Liam Mellows (SF)	Bryan Cusack (SF)	Frank Fahy (SF)	Joseph Whelehan (SF)	Pádraic Ó Máille (SF)	George Nicolls (SF)	Patrick Hogan (SF)	7 seats 1921–1923	
3rd	1922	Thomas O'Connell (Lab)	Bryan Cusack (AT-SF)	Frank Fahy (AT-SF)	Joseph Whelehan (PT-SF)	Pádraic Ó Máille (PT-SF)	George Nicolls (PT-SF)	Patrick Hogan (PT-SF)	7 seats 1921–1923	
4th	1923	Thomas O'Connell (Lab)	Barney Mellows (Rep)	Frank Fahy (Rep)	Louis O'Dea (Rep)	Pádraic Ó Máille (CnaG)	George Nicolls (CnaG)	Patrick Hogan (CnaG)	Seán Broderick (CnaG)	James Cosgrave (Ind.)
5th	1927 (Jun)	Gilbert Lynch (Lab)	Thomas Powell (FF)	Frank Fahy (Note: Frank Fahy served as Ceann Comhairle from 9 March 1932.) (FF)	Seán Tubridy (FF)	Mark Killilea Snr (FF)	Martin McDonogh (CnaG)	Patrick Hogan (CnaG)	Seán Broderick (CnaG)	William Duffy (NL)
6th	1927 (Sep)	Stephen Jordan (FF)	Thomas Powell (FF)	Frank Fahy (FF)	Seán Tubridy (FF)	Mark Killilea Snr (FF)	Martin McDonogh (CnaG)	Patrick Hogan (CnaG)	Seán Broderick (CnaG)	Joseph Mongan (CnaG)
7th	1932	Stephen Jordan (FF)	Thomas Powell (FF)	Frank Fahy (FF)	Patrick Beegan (FF)	Gerald Bartley (FF)	Fred McDonogh (CnaG)	Patrick Hogan (CnaG)	Seán Broderick (CnaG)	Joseph Mongan (CnaG)
8th	1933	Stephen Jordan (FF)	Mark Killilea Snr (FF)	Frank Fahy (FF)	Patrick Beegan (FF)	Gerald Bartley (FF)	Séamus Keely (FF)	Patrick Hogan (CnaG)	Seán Broderick (CnaG)	Martin McDonogh (CnaG)
8th	1935 by-election	Stephen Jordan (FF)	Mark Killilea Snr (FF)	Frank Fahy (FF)	Patrick Beegan (FF)	Gerald Bartley (FF)	Séamus Keely (FF)	Patrick Hogan (CnaG)	Seán Broderick (CnaG)	Eamon Corbett (FF)
8th	1936 by-election	Stephen Jordan (FF)	Mark Killilea Snr (FF)	Frank Fahy (FF)	Patrick Beegan (FF)	Gerald Bartley (FF)	Séamus Keely (FF)	Martin Neilan (FF)	Seán Broderick (CnaG)	Eamon Corbett (FF)
9th	1937	Constituency abolished. See Galway East and Galway West								
