= Thomas Francis O'Malley =

American politician (1889–1954)

Thomas Francis O'Malley (March 16, 1889 – October 5, 1954) was an American railroad conductor and politician.

O'Malley was born in Duluth, Minnesota. He lived in Duluth, Minnesota with his wife and family and was a railroad conductor. He served in the Minnesota House of Representatives from 1939 until his death in 1954.
