= Thomas O'Malley (writer) =

Thomas O'Malley is an Irish writer.

== Life ==
He emigrated to the U.S. from New Ross, Ireland, at the age of sixteen. He attended the University of Massachusetts Boston, and the Iowa Writers' Workshop. He has been a Returning Writing Fellow at the Fine Arts Work Center in Provincetown, Mass, and the recipient of the Grace Paley endowed Fellowship. He is on the creative writing faculty at Dartmouth College and lives in the Boston area.

== Works ==
- This Magnificent Desolation, (Bloomsbury, 2013)
- In the Province of Saints, (Little Brown, & Co., 2005)
- Serpents in the Cold, (Mulholland, 2015)
- "Resurrection Men" anthologized in A Fictional History of the United States With Huge Chunks Missing, (Akashic Books, 2006).
- “Night Slides Falling to Light,” anthologized in Where Love Is Found: 24 Tales of Connection, (Washington Square Press, 2006)
