= John O'Malley (politician) =

Irish-born American politician (1878–1940)

John O'Malley (May 13, 1878 – September 15, 1940) was an Irish-born American politician and businessman.

Born in County Mayo, Ireland, O'Malley emigrated to the United States and settled in St. Louis, Missouri. In 1902, he moved to Milwaukee, Wisconsin. He was a stone mason and owned saloons in St. Louis and Milwaukee. He also worked for the Milwaukee Street Department. O'Malley served in the Wisconsin State Assembly from 1933 to 1937 and was a Democrat, O'Malley died in a hospital in Milwaukee, Wisconsin after a short illness.
