= Casa dei Cavalieri di Rodi =

Historic building in Rome

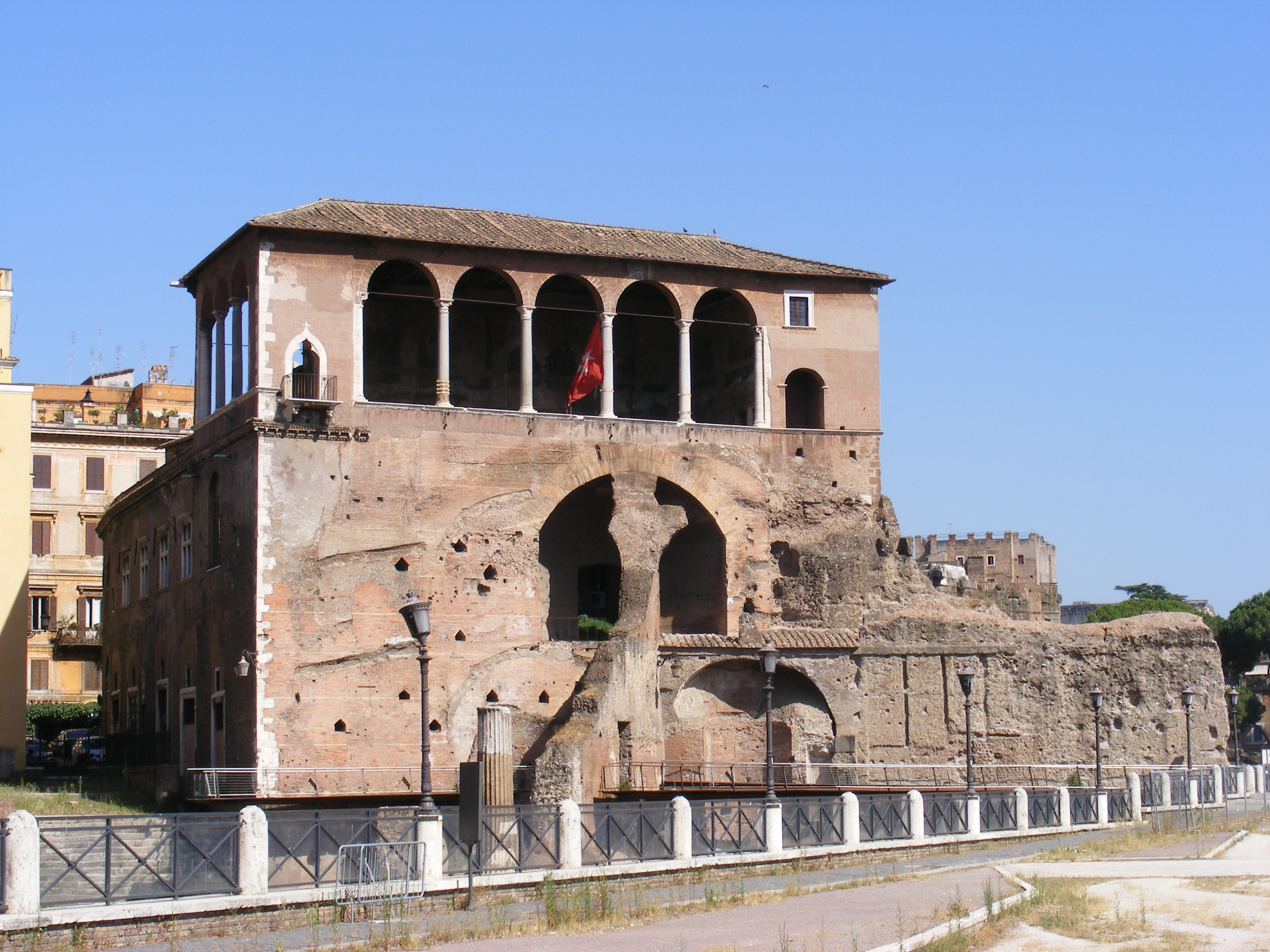
- La casa dei Cavalieri di Rodi da via dei Fori imperiali
- Click on the map for a fullscreen view
- 41°53′41″N 12°29′11″E
- Location: Rome

The Casa dei Cavalieri di Rodi (House of the Knights of Rhodes) is a building in Rome. Sited in the ruins of the Forum of Augustus, it was built by the Knights Hospitaller at the end of the 13th century and since 1946 has been used by their successors, the Sovereign Military Order of Malta.

== History ==
=== Basilian monastery ===
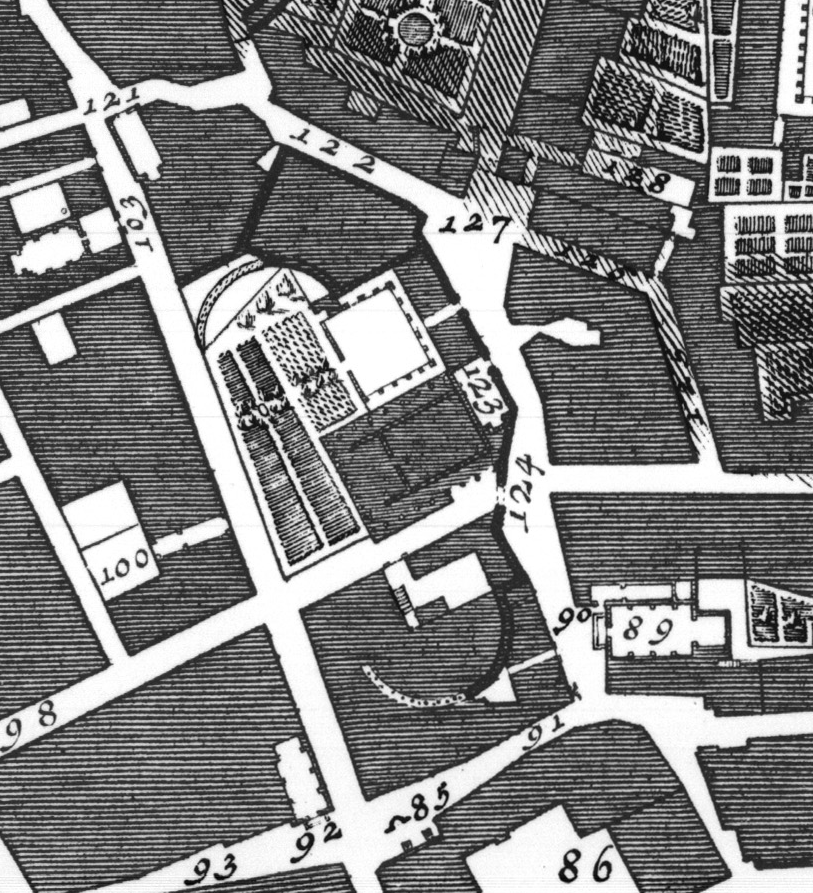
The Casa dei Cavalieri di Rodi and the Dominican convent on the site of the Forum of Augustus, by Augusto (Nolli, 1748)

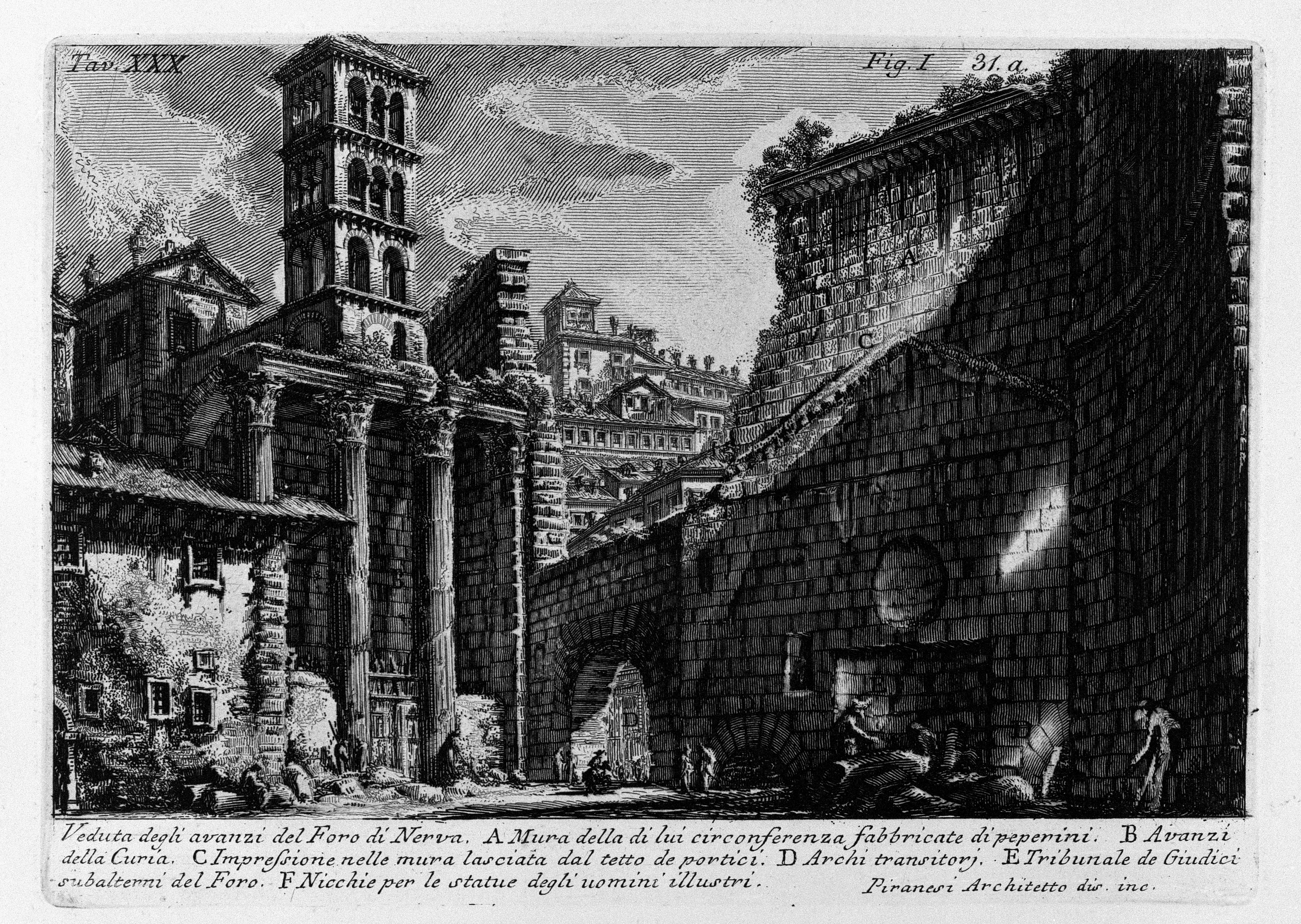
The Temple of Mars with the campanile of the Basilians and the Arco dei Pantani, by Piranesi, 1756 - note the name Foro di Nerva

The Forum of Augustus and Temple of Mars Ultor were probably destroyed by earthquakes in the 5th century. In the medieval era it was known by several names - the forum itself as Foro transitorio, Foro di Nerva and Foro di San Basilio, and the temple as Palatium Traiani Imperatoris (palace of emperor Trajan) or the temple of Nerva ('tempio di Nerva'). 'Foro di San Basilio' refers to the first medieval use of the Forum, the small 10th century church of San Basilio al Foro di Augusto and its adjoining Basilian monastery, built on the podium of the temple and its exedra. The walls of that complex were found during the 1930s demolition phase and dated to the 9th-10th centuries.

The Basilian church was a small oratory built into the temple's apse. It was originally intended to be used as a monastery.

=== Restoration ===
The convent was demolished in 1930 and the building was transferred to the Comune di Roma, which restored it between 1940 and 1950 before assigning it to the Order of Malta straight after World War Two.

== Bibliography ==
- Guido Fiorini, La casa dei Cavalieri di Rodi al Foro di Augusto, Libreria dello Stato, 1951

| Preceded by San Vitale, Rome | Landmarks of Rome; Casa dei Cavalieri di Rodi | Succeeded by Castel Sant'Angelo |
