= William O'Malley (Jesuit) =

American actor and priest (1931–2023)

William J. O'Malley
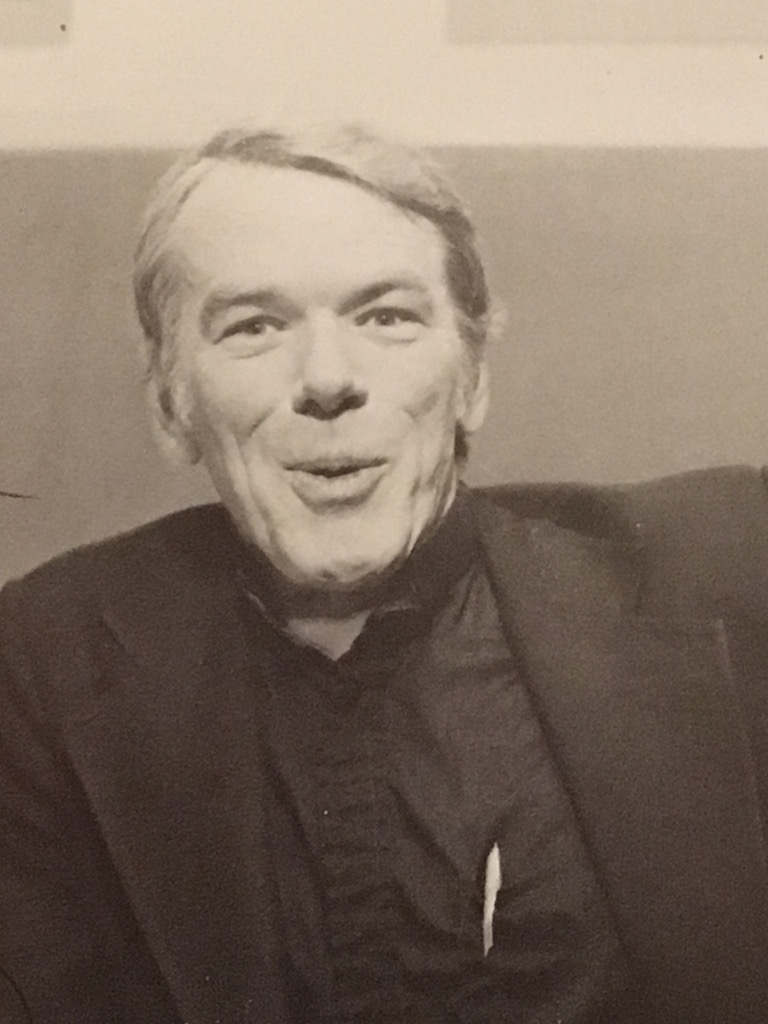
- O'Malley in 1979
- Born: William J. O'Malley; August 18, 1931; Buffalo, New York, U.S.
- Died: July 15, 2023 (aged 91); Newton, Massachusetts, U.S.
- Education: College of the Holy Cross (BA)
- Occupation(s): Priest, actor, teacher, author
- Known for: The Exorcist (film), The Fifth Week, Meeting the Living God, Help My Unbelief, You'll Never Be Younger and other books

William J. O'Malley (August 18, 1931 – July 15, 2023) was an American priest, teacher, author, and actor.

== Life ==
O'Malley was born in Buffalo, New York, and attended Canisius High School there. He graduated from the College of the Holy Cross in 1953.

He taught Advanced Placement (AP) English and theology for 22 years at McQuaid Jesuit High School in Rochester, New York. He also directed the school's musical and drama productions.

O'Malley taught theology, AP English and later an elective called The Problem of God/Morality/Marriage/Fatherhood at Fordham Preparatory School in the Bronx until June 2012, when he was let go from his teaching position. Rev. Kenneth Boller, the school president at the time, described his dismissal as due to his “confrontational style.”

He was an adjunct professor in the School of Professional and Continuing Studies at Fordham University until 2003, and later a professor of theology and the humanities at Seattle University.

O'Malley is best known for his portrayal of Father Dyer in The Exorcist, for which he was also a technical advisor. According to one source, he was the first Catholic priest to portray a priest in a commercial motion picture. He also appeared in the E! True Hollywood Story of the Curse of The Exorcist.

As an author, O'Malley wrote 37 published books, including Choosing to Be Catholic, Why Be Catholic?, God: The Oldest Question, Meeting the Living God, Building Your Own Conscience, and The Fifth Week. His book, Help My Unbelief, won a Catholic Book Award in 2009. His book, You'll Never Be Younger: A Good News Spirituality for Those Over 60 won a Catholic Press Association Book Award in 2016.

On stage in Rochester he appeared as Jim, the gentleman caller, in a production of The Glass Menagerie at the Theater at the Tracks and as the cleric in the Rochester Community Players production of The Power and the Glory, by Graham Greene.

In 2019, O'Malley was accused of sexually abusing a former student in the 1980s. The accusation was made as part of a mass complaint that allowed accusers to bring legal action in sexual abuse cases where the statute of limitations had expired. O'Malley was not charged with any offense in the matter.

O'Malley died on July 15, 2023, at the age of 91.

== Awards and honorary degrees ==
In 1990, O'Malley received an honorary doctorate in humane letters from Le Moyne College. In 2007, he received the F. Sadlier Dinger Award from educational publisher William H. Sadlier, Inc. in recognition of his outstanding contributions to the ministry of religious education in America, for which he received three Best Article Awards from the Catholic Press Association.
