= Charles J. O'Malley =

Irish financier and newspaper reporter

Charles Joseph O'Malley (1867–1955) was an Irish financier and newspaper reporter.

O'Malley was a native of Newport, County Mayo, who emigrated to the United States in 1883. He worked as a newspaper reporter in Michigan, Chicago and Denver. He later became the publisher of a trade journal in New York City. Moving to Boston in 1905 to work for Bennett publications, he set up an advertising agency, the O'Malley Advertising & Selling Company in 1912. As an industrialist, he became a life member of the National Association of Cotton Manufacturers and was treasurer of The O'Malley Associate Trust. In 1939, he published a memoir, It Was News To Me.
