= Kansas Health Foundation =

Nonprofit organization

The Kansas Health Foundation (KHF) is a nonprofit organization based in Wichita, Kansas, U.S., but is statewide in its focus and grantmaking abilities. Its mission is to improve public health and wellness throughout Kansas. Through grantmaking, the foundation works to "improve the health of all Kansans by promoting health and wellness in schools, neighborhoods and workplaces; to grow leaders in communities; inspire decision makers; and act as a voice for healthy public policy in Kansas for generations."

The KHF (originally the Wesley Medical Endowment Foundation) has shifted from its original focus on medical cures, instead switching predominantly towards preventive solutions for public health. It uses a wide range of approaches. For instance, it has funded warm clothing for schoolchildren, currently funds public health research and data, and attempts to develop future civic and healthcare leaders.

With over $500 million in net assets, the KHF is one of the nation's wealthiest such foundations.

== History ==
In 1985, the Wesley Medical Center, in Wichita, Kansas, one of Kansas' largest hospitals, was sold to the for-profit Hospital Corporation of America (HCA) by the hospital's founder/owner, the Kansas West Conference of the United Methodist Church. The sale’s profits ($265 million) were used to fund two organizations focused on improving health in Kansas:

- United Methodist Health Ministry Fund and
- Wesley Medical Endowment Foundation, which became the Kansas Health Foundation (KHF)

Over the years, the foundation has helped start the:

- Kansas Health Institute, in Topeka, Kansas, which provides health data to policymakers,
- Tobacco-Free Kansas Coalition, in Topeka, which campaigns against tobacco consumption in Kansas,
- Kansas Leadership Center, in Wichita, which provides leadership training for Kansas civic activists.

The KHF has partnered with over 40 other Kansas community foundations, organizations and programs, largely to help fund and promote health and wellness improvement efforts throughout the state.

In 1997, the KHF focused more specifically on children's health. Partnering with the state's largest advertising agency, Sullivan, Higdon, Sink, the KHF developed the "Take It Outside" campaign to urge adults to avoid smoking in homes and buildings where children are present.

The KHF later became heavily involved with Kansas state government, and universities, and local governments in Kansas—particularly through the joint Kansas Public Health Workforce Development Coordinating Council —to fund, develop and coordinate public health workforce training through various educational methodologies, delivery methods and opportunities. Examples have included:

- Kansas Public Health Grand Rounds (continuing education programs and webinars for Kansas physicians), operated with funding from the KHF
- The Masters in Public Health (M.P.H.) degree program at the University of Kansas and other Kansas universities, developed with the assistance of the KHF (including $1.8 million in 2008).
- The Nurse Practitioner degree and certification program at Kansas universities, developed with KHF assistance.
- The "One Health Kansas" program, to help manage the health risks and effects of the health interrelationships between people, animals and the environment (including diseases transmitted from plants and animals to people, emerging zoonotic diseases, effects of human migration and global trade)—developed in 2008 by Kansas State University with over $2 million in funding from the KHF.

In 2014, the KHF—operating through its KHF Fellows program—began looking into the links between mental illness and tobacco-related death, asserting that 26% of Kansas smokers suffered from some sort of mental illness.

== Financial portfolio and management ==
With an initial $200 million endowment to focus on improving the health of all Kansans, the KHF quickly became one of the 40 largest grantmaking foundations in the United States, and it ranked as one of the top 10 U.S. healthcare foundations.

Growing from the original $200 million endowment, the foundation reportedly had $440 million in assets in 2010, to $469 million in assets by the end of 2012. Assets topped $475 million, by May 2013, ultimately reaching $519 million in net assets in 2013, making the foundation the largest philanthropic entity in the state, according to KHI Pres. Steven Coen, and making it one of the nation's wealthiest such foundations, according to its official website.

The foundation funds programs with the interest earned from investments of the original endowment, preserving it as a perpetual funding source. In 2012, it issued over $22.9 million in grants, and by then it had issued over $500 million in grants since its origins in 1985.

== Key people ==
The foundation is led by President and CEO Steve Coen and Board of Director Chairwoman Commissioner Shelly Buhler.

== Facilities ==
KHF operates out of its custom-built $9-million downtown multi-story glass building at 309 E. Douglas, in Wichita, Kansas (zip 67202), since the building's completion in 2013. The facility is shared with some of the KHF's affiliate entities, including the Kansas Leadership Center.

== Outcomes ==
Little clear and detailed information is readily available online about the correlation between Kansas health changes and KHF-backed programs.

=== General health ===
Citing the website America’s Health Rankings (an annual report published by major philanthropic organizations and health groups), the KHF concedes that Kansas fell from the 8th to the 27th healthiest state in the country, during the years 1991 through 2014, when KHF programs were well underway.

=== Children ===
According to the 2014 KIDS COUNT Data Book, by the Annie E. Casey Foundation—the leading reference on child health and welfare in the U.S.—Kansas ranked 15th among the 50 states in overall child well-being. (NOTE: Earlier data was not readily available).

=== Smoking and tobacco use ===
Tobacco use (particularly cigarette smoking) is Kansas' top cause of preventable death and disease, with one of every five Kansas adults smoking cigarettes.

However, the KHF largely blames this on decisions by Kansas legislators and governors to underfund tobacco prevention, making Kansas (in 2013) 41st in the nation for per-capita spending on tobacco prevention. In 2013, the federal government's Centers for Disease Control and Prevention (CDC) recommended that states spend $32.1 million annually on tobacco prevention, but Kansas was only funding such programs at $946,671 per year, despite collecting a combined $154.3 million in 2013 from the settlement and tobacco taxes. Critics cite Kansas politicians' decisions to divert the state's share of the tobacco lawsuit settlement away from tobacco-use prevention and mitigation towards completely unrelated activity, particularly to plug shortfalls in the state budget and facilitate tax cuts.

Kansas Department of Health and Education former spokeswoman Miranda Steele has countered that the state's high-school smoking rate (at 14%, below the nationwide average of 18%) is below the smoking rates of neighboring states, including some which spend more, per person, on tobacco prevention.
