= Malteser International =

Aid agency of the Sovereign Military Order of Malta

- Abbreviation: MI
- Formation: January 2, 2005; 21 years ago
- Type: Aid agency
- Headquarters: Cologne, Germany; New York, US
- Region served: Worldwide (32 countries in 2019)
- Members: 27 Associations and Priories of the Sovereign Military Order of Malta
- Official language: English, French, German
- Secretary General: Clemens Graf von Mirbach-Harff
- President: Thierry de Beaumont-Beynac
- Affiliations: Sovereign Military Order of Malta
- Website: www.malteser-international.org www.orderofmaltarelief.org

Malteser International is an international non-governmental aid agency for humanitarian aid of the Sovereign Military Order of Malta. Developed in 2005 from the foreign aid service of Malteser Germany (founded 1953), and having the status of an independent eingetragener Verein since 2013, the agency has more than 50 years of experience in humanitarian relief. It currently implements around 100 projects in some 30 countries in Africa, Asia, Europe, Middle East and the Americas. The organization's General Secretariat is located in Cologne, Germany with regional headquarters for Europe and the Americas located in Cologne and New York City respectively. The membership of Malteser International consists of 27 national associations and priories of the Sovereign Military Order of Malta, who are responsible for supporting the organization within their jurisdictions.

== History ==
In 1992, the foreign aid department of Malteser Germany combined forces with other relief services of the Sovereign Military Order of Malta around the world to form the Emergency Corps of the Order of Malta (ECOM). ECOM provided relief after natural and man-made disasters, such as the Kosovo War (1998–1999) and the 2003 Bam earthquake in Iran. Malteser International was created to replace ECOM as the worldwide relief agency of the Order of Malta, in response to the 2004 Indian Ocean earthquake and tsunami in the Indian Ocean, broadening its mission to include long-term rehabilitation and development programmes.

Some of the organisation's most important deployments include:

- 1956: Refugee aid at the border of Austria and Hungary
- 1966–1975: Refugee aid in Vietnam
- Since 1979: Refugee aid in Thailand (for refugees coming from neighboring countries)
- Since 1980: transport of humanitarian aid to Central and Eastern Europe
- 1989: humanitarian aid for East German refugees in Budapest
- 1994–1996: Aid to Rwanda
- 1999: Kosovo War
- Since 2001: Emergency relief and reconstruction in Myanmar
- 2004: Refugee aid in Darfur, Sudan
- 2005: 2004 Indian Ocean earthquake and tsunami relief in South and Southeast Asia
- 2010: Relief after the 2010 Haiti earthquake and 2010 Chile earthquake, flood relief in Pakistan
- 2011: Earthquake relief in Japan, drought relief in northern Kenya
- Since 2012: Relief for people affected by conflict in Syria, and neighboring countries.
- Since 2014: Aid for refugees in South Sudan and displaced people in northern Iraq
- 2015: Relief following the 2015 Nepal earthquake
- 2016: Relief following Hurricane Matthew
- 2020: Emergency response after the 2020 Beirut explosion
- 2023: Emergency response after the 2023 Turkey–Syria earthquake
- 2025: Emergency response to the humanitarian situation as a result of the Sudanese civil war (2023-present)

== Organisation ==
27 national associations and priories of the Sovereign Military Order of Malta are currently members of Malteser International. Their representatives, together with the board of directors, the secretary-general, the vice secretary-general and the chaplain of Malteser International, form the General Assembly. The Board of Directors consists of the President and up to six Vice-Presidents. The Secretary General manages the operational activities in line with the adopted budget and the strategy of Malteser International.In October 2020, Malteser International's first Secretary General Ingo Radtke marked his retirement after 15 years in the role, handing over to Clemens Graf von Mirbach-Harff.

=== Policy ===
Malteser International is committed by its statutes to helping people in all parts of the world without distinction of religion, race or political persuasion. Christian values and the humanitarian principles of impartiality and independence are the foundation of its work. Despite being a Catholic organisation, Malteser International works also in non-Christian countries and therefore employs workers from various religious backgrounds in its projects. The overwhelming majority of Malteser International's more than 980 staff members are local people, while the organization works closely with local partner organisations, including other Order of Malta organizations, both religious and non-religious NGOs, and church structures in its project countries. Malteser International adheres to several internationally recognized codes and standards, such as the "Code of Conduct" (Principles of Conduct for the International Red Cross and Red Crescent Movement and NGOs in Disaster Response Programmes) and the "Sphere Project".

=== Project volume ===
2019: €80.3 million

- Africa: €19.2 million
- Asia: €31 million
- Americas: €3.6 million
- Middle East: €40.9 million
- Europe: €1 million
- Management and administration costs: €4 million

== International partnerships ==
Malteser International is a member of:

- Aktion Deutschland Hilft
- People In Aid
- VOICE
- VENRO
- German WASH-Netzwerk
