= Cosgrach mac Flannbhrath =

King of Umaill (died 812)

Cosgrach mac Flannbhrath, King of Umaill, died 812.

Flathghal's relationship to the kings Dunghal mac Flaithniadh (died 776) and Aedhghal (died 779) is uncertain, as they does not seem to appear in the extant genealogies.

However, he was a son of King Flannabhra (died 773) and succeeded his brother, Flathghal mac Flannbhrath, in 782. He reigned for fully thirty years, and it is from him that all subsequent kings of Umaill appear to descend. However, the exact succession is unclear for many generations after Cosgrach's death.

His grandson, Maille mac Conall, would give his name to the Ó Máille clan.

Preceded by Flathghal mac Flannbhrath	King of Umaill; 782–812	Succeeded by Cairbre mac Cinaedh
