= Flathghal mac Flannbhrath =

Flathghal mac Flannbhrath, King of Umaill, died 782.

Flathghal's relationship to the previous two kings is unknown, as they does not seem to appear in the extant genealogies.

However, he was a son of King Flannabhra (died 773) and was succeeded in 782 by his brother, Cosgrach mac Flannbhrath.

The succession in these years may have been disputed between two or more different segments of the ruling dynasty before settling upon the sons of Flannabhra.

== See also ==
- Grace O'Malley, c.1530-c.1603, "Pirate Queen of Connacht."
- Óró Sé do Bheatha 'Bhaile

Preceded by Aedhghal	King of Umaill; 779–782	Succeeded by Cosgrach mac Flannbhrath
