= List of shipwrecks in the 15th century =

The list of shipwrecks in the 15th century includes some ships sunk, wrecked or otherwise lost between (and including) the years 1401 to 1500.

== 1401–1410 ==
1405

- Unnamed ship: Wrecked on the Eddystone, her mast was found at Rame Head and sold by the Duchy of Cornwall in Plymouth.

1406

- Sancta Maria et Sanctus Nicholaus (Catalonia): A carrack was stranded near Portsmouth during a storm. She was broken up and her cargo of spices, alum, wine, fruit, grain and other goods stolen by local people.

1408

- Corentin (France): The carrack was stranded in the Bay of Biscay, near Fromentine, France, during a storm.

== 1411–1420 ==
1412

4 February (first report) — Unknown ( Kingdom of England): Henry V's carrack carrying wine from Aquitaine was wrecked on or near the Isle of Wight during a storm, which may be the same storm as the following vessel at Southampton.

12 February (first report) — Unknown (Genoa): Wrecked in a storm when departing Southampton. Sometimes recorded as Stephanus Columbilus which may be a version of the masters name.

1413

- around 9 June — Six unnamed ships (Umhaill): a fleet of the O'Malley clan led by Tuthal Ó Máille, sailing from Ulster to Clew Bay, were blown off course toward Scotland. Six of seven ships were lost, with about 244 deaths.

1416

- August or September — Unidentified: An Italian or French carrack foundered off Southampton with eight hundred troops on board.

1419

- Agase ( Kingdom of England): An Italian carrack was stranded in mudflats either shortly after being captured, or off Southampton quay in a storm.

== 1421–1430 ==
1425

- (first report) — Mochechawde (Spain): Enquiry held at Poole, Dorset after a ship registered in Gijón, and carrying a cargo of wine, was wrecked near Swanage.

1428

- 12 December (first report) — Seintmarie de Portaferro (Portugal): The Lisbon ship was captured by English pirates and wrecked near Southampton. Her goods owned by Afonso Rico and other merchants were plundered. Also recorded as Santa Maria de Portaferro.

1430

- 1 March (first report) — Unidentified (Genoa): Enquiry by Thomas Arundell and James Chiddelegh into the plunder of a carrack, owned by merchants of Genoa who lived in England, when it was lost near the sound (portus) of Plymouth.

Unknown date

- Holigost (Royal Navy): The carrack sank in the River Hamble after 1422.

== 1431–1440 ==
1435

- 6 February (first report) — an unknown number of hulks were lost near Southampton. All of the ships involved appear to have been Flemish from either Bruges or Amsterdam

1439

- Grace Dieu (Kingdom of England): Hit by a lightning strike and burnt to the waterline while laid up in the River Hamble, Hampshire.

== 1461–1470 ==
1468

- Raphael (or Raphaell) (Kingdom of England): Lost in Bude Bay, Cornwall while heading for her home port of Bristol from Danzig.
- Unnamed vessel: The ship sank at Newport, Monmouthshire, Wales. Remains discovered in 2002 and under reconstruction as a museum exhibit as of January 2020.
- 20 November — Hanneke Vrome ( Lübeck): Wrecked near the island of Jussarö in Raseborg, Finland on her way from Lübeck to Tallinn.

== 1471–1480 ==
1478

- 9 December — La Kateryne (probably County of Flanders): Wrecked near St Michael's Mount, Cornwall. She had left Spain with a cargo of textiles, iron, wax and other goods. Nine Spanish, late medieval gold coins found at Praa Sands by metal detector could be from this wreck.

1480

- December — Unnamed: Four ships carrying almost 1,000 tons of wine lost in Mount's Bay, Cornwall.

== 1481–1490 ==
1483

- Unknown date— A carrick (Spain) sank off Sandwich, Kent, England.

1484

- 15 October — many ships in Kingrode sank in a storm described as the "greatest wind that ever was heard of, which caused a great flood in most part of the land from Bristol to the Mownt and many other places".
- 15 October — Anthony (Kingdom of England): Wrecked (set alond) at Holow Backes (or bakkes), Bristol.
- 15 October — Unidentified (Bilbao): Wrecked (set alond) at Holow Backes (or bakkes), Bristol.

1488

- (first report) — Anthony or Anthony Margaret (Kingdom of England: A great ship lost in Hungrode, her home port of Bristol, by default of the master, or lost at Kingrode by default of the master. See 1484 above.

== 1491–1500 ==
1492

- 25 December — Santa Maria ( Spain): The largest of three ships use by Christopher Columbus on his first voyage across the Atlantic, Santa Maria ran aground off the present-day site of Cap-Haïtien, Haiti.

1495

- late October — Unnamed : Three ships sank and all the crews lost when a hurricane struck the harbour at La Isabela, Hispaniola.
- Summer — Gribshunden (Denmark): Caught fire and sank off Ronneby, Sweden.

1499

- January — São Rafael ( Portugal): Part of Vasco da Gama's expedition to India, São Rafael was burnt and scuttled in Malindi, Kenya due to the crew suffering from scurvy.

1500

- late July — Unnamed (Spain): Two caravels sank, along with their crews near Crooked Island, Bahamas during a hurricane. The caravels were part of an expedition led by Vicente Yáñez Pinzón.
- (first report) — Unidentified (English or Spanish): Wrecked near Handfast Point, Dorset with a cargo of pottery.
- (first report) — Unidentified: Sailing ship wrecked on Lundy, known as the Gull Rock wreck and protected under the Protection of Wrecks Act 1973. Evidence for the wreck include a wrought iron gun, stone shot and two wrought iron breechblock and may be a Genoese carrack wrecked in 1418.

== See also ==
- Protection of Wrecks Act 1973
- Archaeology of shipwrecks
- List of designations under the Protection of Wrecks Act
