= Cormac Cruinn Ó Máille =

Cormac Cruinn Ó Máille (died 1384) was an Irish noble.

Ó Máille was a grandson of Eoghan mac Diarmait Ó Máille, a brother of Domnall Ruadh O Maille (died 1337). Cormac was a son of Domnall mac Eoghan, and had brothers Eoghan, Brian, Cormac Buadhach, Ruaibh. Though not a chief himself, Cormac was of the line that provided all subsequent Ó Máille Chiefs of the Name.

The Annals of the Four Masters record that "A meeting took place between O'Flaherty and O'Malley, but a quarrel arose between them, in which Owen O'Malley, Cormac O'Malley (i.e., Cormac Cruinn) and many others besides these, were slain by the people of O'Flaherty."

== See also ==
- Maille mac Conall
- Domnall Ruadh O Maille
- Grace O'Malley
- Martin O'Malley
