= Gilla na nInghen Ua Cobhthaigh =

Gilla na nInghen Ua Cobthaigh, King of Umaill, died 1004.

Ua Cobthaigh is the only ruler of Umaill not to bear the surname Ó Máille

== See also ==
- Grace O'Malley, c.1530-c.1603, "Pirate Queen of Connacht."
- Óró Sé do Bheatha 'Bhaile

Preceded by Cairbre mac Cinaedh	King of Umaill ?–1004	Succeeded by Domhnall Ua Máille
