= Birlinn =

Middle ages Scottish ship

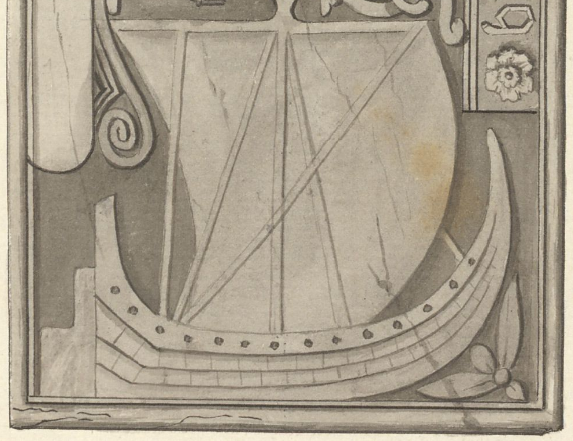
A carving of a birlinn from a sixteenth-century tombstone in MacDufie's Chapel, Oronsay, as engraved in 1772.

The birlinn (Scottish Gaelic: bìrlinn) or West Highland galley was a wooden vessel propelled by sail and oar, used extensively in the Hebrides and West Highlands of Scotland from the Middle Ages on. Variants of the name in English and Lowland Scots include "berlin" and "birling". The Gaelic term may derive from the Norse byrðingr (ship of boards), a type of cargo vessel. It has been suggested that a local design lineage might also be traceable to vessels similar to the Broighter-type boat (first century BC), equipped with oars and a square sail, without the need to assume a specific Viking design influence. It is uncertain, however, whether the Broighter model represents a wooden vessel or a skin-covered boat of the currach type. The majority of scholars emphasise the Viking influence on the birlinn.

The birlinn was clinker-built and could be sailed or rowed. It had a single mast with a square sail. Smaller vessels of this type might have had as few as twelve oars, with the larger West Highland galley having as many as forty. For over four hundred years, down to the seventeenth century, the birlinn was the dominant vessel in the Hebrides.

In 1310, King Robert the Bruce granted Thomas Randolph, 1st Earl of Moray a reddendo or charter making him Lord of the Isle of Man in exchange for six birlinns of 26 oars. A 1615 report to the Scottish Privy Council made a distinction between galleys, having between 18 and 20 oars, and birlinns, with between 12 and 18 oars. There was no suggestion of structural differences. The report stated that there were three men per oar.

The birlinn appears in Scottish heraldry as the "lymphad", from the Scottish Gaelic long fhada.

== Use ==
In terms of design and function, there was considerable similarity between the local birlinn and the ships used by Norse incomers to the Isles. In an island environment ships were essential for the warfare which was endemic in the area, and local lords used the birlinn extensively from at least the thirteenth century. The strongest of the regional naval powers were the MacDonalds of Islay.

The Lords of the Isles of the Late Middle Ages maintained the largest fleet in the Hebrides. It is likely that vessels of the birlinn type of galley were used in the 1156 sea battle in which Somerled, Lord of Argyll, the ancestor of the lords, firmly established himself in the Hebrides by confronting his brother-in-law, Godred Olafsson, King of the Isles.

In 1433, Alexander of Islay, Lord of the Isles brought his fleet of war galleys to Ulster to aid his cousin Donald Macdonald, Lord of Dunyvaig and the Glens, and the O'Neills of Tirowen (Tyrone) in defeating the O'Donnells, who were allied with King James of Scotland.

In 1608 Andrew Stewart, Lord Ochiltree was sent by James VI of Scotland to quell feuds in the Western Isles. His orders included the destruction of shipping, named in his commissions as lymphads, galleys, and birlinns belonging to rebellious subjects.

Though the surviving evidence has mostly to do with the birlinn in a naval context, there is independent evidence of mercantile activity for which such shipping would have been essential. There is some evidence for mercantile centres in Islay, Gigha, Kintyre and Knapdale, and in the fourteenth century there was constant trade between the Isles, Ireland and England under the patronage of local lords. It is possible that the resources of the Highlands and Islands were not sufficient to support both naval and trading types of ship, leaving the galley with both roles. The derivation of the word birlinn from the name of a Nordic cargo vessel is suggestive of that situation. Otherwise the chief uses of the birlinn would have been troop-carrying, fishing and cattle transport.

== Construction and maintenance ==
In some ways the birlinn paralleled the more robust ocean-going craft of Norse design. Viking ships were double-ended, with a keel scarfed to stems fore and aft. A shell of thin planking (strake) was constructed on the basis of the keel, the planks being edge-joined and clenched with iron nails. Symmetrical ribs or frames were then lashed to the strakes or secured with trenails. Over most of the ribs was laid a slender crossbeam and a thwart. The mast was stepped amidships or nearly so, and oars, including a steering oar, were also used. The stem and stern post sometimes had carefully carved notches for plank ends, with knees securing the thwarts to the strakes and beams joining the heads of the frames.

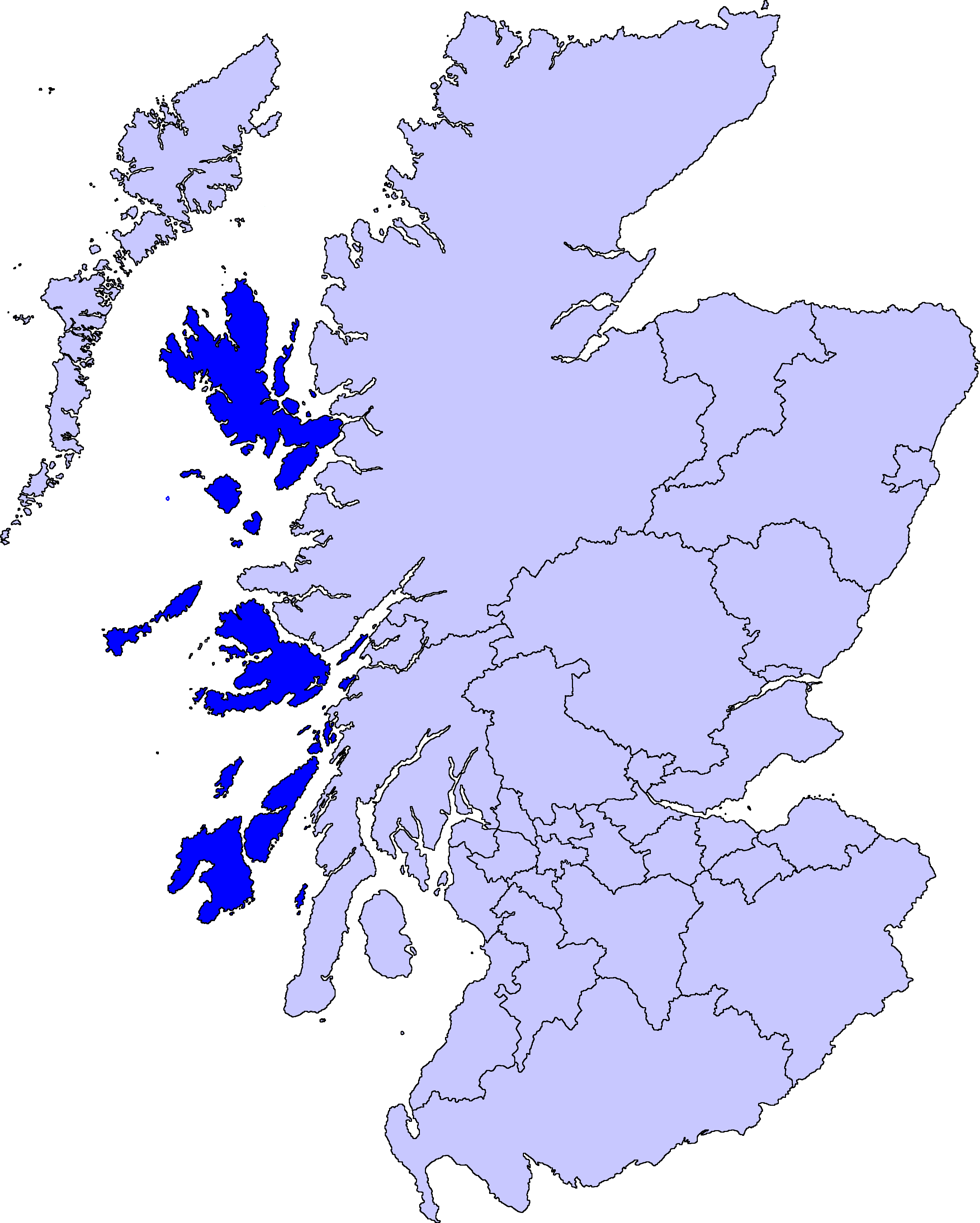
Western Scotland, with the Inner Hebrides shown in dark blue. It was there and on the mainland that timber was most readily obtainable.

The hull bore a general resemblance to the Norse pattern, but stem and stern may have been more steeply pitched (though allowance must be paid for distortion in representation). Surviving images show a rudder. Nineteenth-century boat-building practices in the Highlands are likely to have applied also to the birlinn: examples are the use of dried moss, steeped in tar, for caulking, and the use of stocks in construction.

Oak was the wood favoured both in Western Scotland and in Scandinavia, being tough and resistant to decay. Other types of timber were less often used. It is likely that the Outer Isles of Western Scotland had always been short of timber, but birch, oak and pine abounded in the Inner Isles and on the mainland. The abundance of timber at Lochaber was proverbial: "B'e sin fiodh a chur do Loch Abar" ("Bringing wood to Lochaber") was said of any superfluous undertaking.

The tools used are likely to have included adzes, axes, augers and spoon bits, awls, planes, draw knives and moulding irons, together with other tools typical of the Northern European carpenter's kit. As in traditional shipbuilding, generally, measurements were largely by eye.

The traditional practice of sheltering boats in bank-cuttings ("nausts") – small artificial harbours – was probably also employed with the birlinn. There is evidence in fortified sites of constructed harbours, boat-landings and sea-gates.

The influence of Norse shipbuilding techniques, though plausible, is conjectural, since to date no substantial remnants of a birlinn have been found. Traditional boat-building techniques and terms, however, may furnish a guide as to the vessel's construction.

== Rigging and sails ==
Carved images of the birlinn from the sixteenth century and earlier show the typical rigging: braces, forestay and backstay, shrouds (fore and aft), halyard and a parrel (a movable loop used to secure a yard or gaff to a mast). There is a rudder with pintles on the leading edge, inserted into gudgeons. It is possible that use was made of a wooden bowline or reaching spar (called a beitass by the Norse). This was used to push the luff of the sail out into the wind.

Traditional Highland practice was to make sails of tough, thick-threaded wool, with ropes being made of moss-fir or heather. Medieval sails, in the Highlands as elsewhere, are shown as being sewn out of many small squares, and there is possible evidence of reef points.

== Aileach: a reconstruction ==
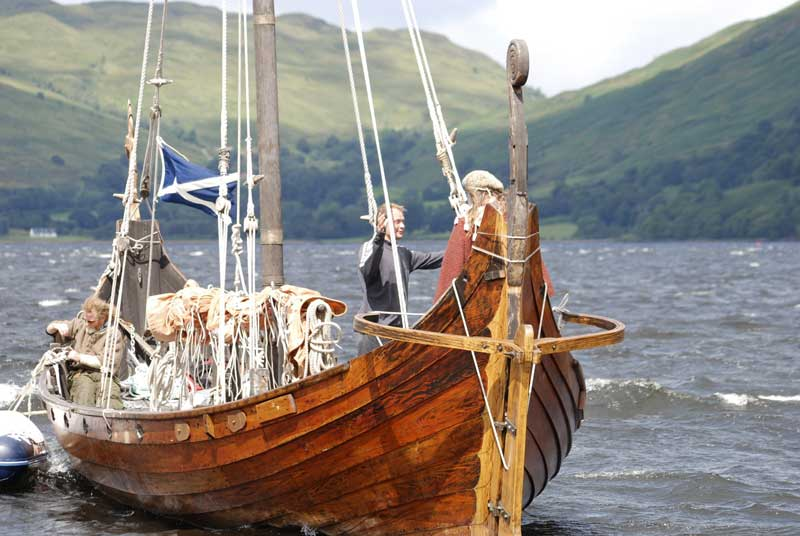
The Aileach, a reconstruction of a Highland galley, in Loch Etive

A reproduction of a 16-oar Highland galley, the Aileach, was built in 1991 at Moville in County Donegal. It was based on representations of such vessels in West Highland sculpture. Despite the good seagoing performance of the vessel, its design has been described as misleading because of an over-reliance in the plan on cramped sculptural images. The vessel was designed with a high, almost vertical, stern and stem. It proved difficult to fit in more than one rower per oar and the thwarts were too close together. Less constricted images from the fourteenth and fifteenth centuries show vessels which are longer and larger.

== Ireland ==
The Irish long fhada seems, from contemporary sources, to have resembled its West Highland equivalent, though there is as yet no archaeological confirmation.

The Annals of the Four Masters record the use of fleets in an Irish context, often with a Scottish connection. In 1413 Tuathal Ó Máille, returning from Ulster to Connacht with seven ships, encountered a severe storm (anfadh na mara) which drove them northwards to Scotland: only one of the ships survived. In 1433 Alexander Macdonald, Lord of the Isles, arrived in Ulster with a large fleet (co c-cobhlach mór) to assist the O'Neills and his cousin, Donald Macdonald, Lord of Dunyvaig and the Glens, in a war with the O'Donnells.

In Ireland oared vessels were employed extensively for warfare and piracy by the O'Malleys and the O'Flathertys, western lords whose base was in Connacht. English officials found it necessary to counter them with similar vessels. The most famous of these local rulers was Grace O'Malley, of whom Sir Richard Bingham reported in 1591 that she had twenty vessels at her command. She, like her father, was engaged in extensive seaborne trade.

There was constant maritime traffic between Ireland and Scotland, and Highland mercenaries were commonly transported by birlinn to Ireland.

== Naval technology ==
The birlinn, when rowed, was distinguished by its speed, and could often evade pursuers as a result. No cannon were mounted even in the later period: the birlinn was too lightly built and its freeboard was too low. It was highly suitable for raiding, however, and with experienced marksmen on board, could mount a formidable defence against small craft. Vessels of this type were at their most vulnerable when beached or when cornered by a heavier vessel carrying cannon.

== Possible changes in design ==
The seal of John Moidartach (from 1572). It shows a birlinn with raised decks.

There is some evidence that by the end of the sixteenth century new influences were affecting birlinn design. A carving made at Arasaig in 1641 shows a vessel with a lowered stem and stern. An English map of north-east Ireland made no later than 1603 shows "fleetes of the Redshanks [Highlanders] of Cantyre" with vessels one-masted as before but with a square sail mounted on a sloping yard arm and a small cabin at the stern projecting backwards. Two Clanranald seals attached to documents dated 1572 show a birlinn with raised decks at stem and stern, a motif repeated in later heraldic devices. If such changes occurred, they would reflect influences from the south-east and ultimately from the Mediterranean. The supporting evidence has been criticised for being slight and unconvincing, but there is pictorial evidence for similar developments in the Irish galley.

== See also ==
- Irish galley
