= Donell Ó Máille =

Donell Ó Máille (died 1401) was King of Umaill in Ireland, and Chief of the Name.

Ó Máille was the third chief of the name to bear the forename Domhnall or Donell, after Domhnall Ua Máille (died 1176) and Domnall Ruadh Ó Máille (died 11 November 1337). However his relationship to these men is unknown.

The length of his reign is uncertain. All that the annals say of him is that he died as Lord of Umaillia ... after having attained to a good old age.

Preceded by Domnall Ruadh Ó Máille	King of Umaill; 1337?–1401	Succeeded by Aodh Ó Máille
