= Domnall Ruadh Ó Máille =

14th-century King of Umaill

Domnall Ruadh Ó Máille, King of Umaill, died 11 November 1337.

Ó Máille was a descendant of Maille mac Conall, and was ruler of the territory of Umaill during the 1330s. He is given as a son of Brian mac Domnall Ó Máille and had a brother, Diarmait. Domnall Ruadh had at least three children: Cormac, Brian, Tadhg (Knox, 388).

The Burke Civil War of the 1330s led to unrest and outright warfare in Connacht (Knox, 134). Ó Máille and his son Cormac seem to have been casualties of the conflict. The Annals of the Four Masters state that "Donnell Roe O'Malley and Cormac, his son, were slain on St. Martin's Night by Clann-Merrick, and other Englishmen who were along with them."

Cormac Ó Máille had issue Mael Secachlainn, Maghnus, Eoghan and Muiredhach, but their descendants do not seem to be recorded in any extant Irish genealogy. Domnall Ruadh's descendants seemed to have lost power and faded from history, to be replaced by the descendants of Eoghan mac Diarmait Ó Máille, nephew to Domnall Ruadh. Eoghan had twelve recorded sons, and it seems that all subsequent chiefs of Umaill descended from him.

== See also ==
- Cormac Cruinn Ó Máille
- Grace O'Malley
- Martin O'Malley

Preceded by Domhnall Ua Máille	King of Umaill ?–1337	Succeeded by Donell Ó Máille
