= Aedhghal =

- King of Umaill
- Died: 779

Aedhghal, King of Umaill, died 779.

Aedhghal's relationship to the previous kings is unknown, as he does not seem to appear in the extant genealogies.

== See also ==
- Grace O'Malley, c.1530-c.1603, "Pirate Queen of Connacht."
- Óró Sé do Bheatha 'Bhaile

Preceded by Dunghal mac Flaithniadh	King of Umaill; 776–779	Succeeded by Flathghal mac Flannbhrath
