= Tuthal Ó Máille =

Tuthal Ó Máille was a Gaelic-Irish Lord who flourished around 1413.

Ó Máille was a member of the O'Malley family of Clew Bay in what is now County Mayo. One of his exploits was recorded in the Annals of the Four Masters under the year 1413:

Tuathal O'Malley went, to be employed on military service, to the province of Ulster, where he remained one year; on his return home with seven ships and their crews, about the festival of St. Columbkille, a storm arose on the western sea, which drove them northwards to the right towards Scotland, where six of the ships, with all their crews, were sunk, among whom were the two sons of Tuathal O'Malley, Donough, son of Owen Connaughtagh Mac Sweeny, Donnell Ballagh, the son of Mac Sweeny Gearr, and two hundred and forty others. Tuathal himself, with much difficulty, effected a landing in Scotland.

Ó Máille was not however Chief of the Name; this was Aodh Ó Máille, who was killed by his kinsman, Diarmaid Ó Máille, in 1415.
