= Domhnall Ua Máille =

Domhnall Ua Máille, Lord of Ui Mail and Chief of the Name, died 1176.

Ua Máille was lord of the area around Clew Bay in what is now County Mayo. According to Knox, his pedigree is as follows:

Domnall mac Muiredhach mac Domnall Finn mac Muiredhach mac Dubhdara mac Muiredhach mac Dubhdara mac Dubhdara mac Flannabhra mac Seachnusach mac Maille mac Conall.

Domhnall himself is given a son, Brian, who had sons Domnall Ruadh Ó Máille (died 1337) and Diarmait.

== See also ==
- Grace O'Malley, c.1530-c.1603, "Pirate Queen of Connacht."
- Óró Sé do Bheatha 'Bhaile

== Family tree ==
   Domhnall Ua Máille, died 1176.
   |
   |
   Brian
   |
   |
   Diarmait
   |
   |
  Eoghan mac Diarmait Ó Máille
    |
    |_____________________________________________________________________________________________________________________________
    |         |       |      |      |       |           |            |        |       |      |         |
    |         |       |      |      |       |           |            |        |       |      |         |
 Diarmait  Domnall  Conor  Maine  Brian  Ruaidhri  Maelsechlainn  Donchadh  Tomas  Maghnus  Aedh  Tadhg Ballach
    |         |       |
    |         |       |__________________________________________
    |         |       |             |           |             |
    |         |       |             |           |             |
    |         |      Dubhgall   Muiredhach   Tuathal   Maelsechlainn (died 1396)
    |         |
    |         |______________________________________________________________
    |         |                           |       |          |             |
    |         |                           |       |          |             |
    |       Cormac Cruinn Ó Máille  Eoghan  Brian  Cormac Buadhach   Ruaibh
    |             died 1384.
    |
    |___________________________________________
    |           |          |         |        |
    |           |          |         |        |
    Cormac   Diarmait    Eoghan   Dubhdara   Tadhg

Preceded by Gilla na nInghen Ua Cobhthaigh	King of Umaill ?–1176	Succeeded by Domnall Ruadh Ó Máille
