= Tadhg mac Diarmaid Ó Máille =

Tadhg mac Diarmaid Ó Máille (IPA: ˈt̪ˠəiˈmˠakˈdʲiəɾˠmˠədʲˈoːˈmˠaːlʲə), King of Umaill, died 1467.

| Preceded by Diarmaid Ó Máille | King of Umaill ?–1467 | Succeeded by Eoghan Dubhdara Ó Máille |
