= Irish galley =

Single-masted ship with oars

The Irish galley was a vessel in use in the West of Ireland down to the seventeenth century, and was propelled both by oars and sail. In fundamental respects it resembled the Scottish galley or bìrlinn, their mutual ancestor being the Viking longship. Both the Irish and Scottish versions were colloquially known as longa fada (longships). The Irish galley was commonly an eight or twelve-oared vessel and was used for both warfare and trade. It was notable for its speed when rowed.

Conventional galleys were being built in a number of Irish ports in the fourteenth century, and were even commissioned by the English Crown. The use of such oared vessels in Northern Europe, in contrast to the Mediterranean, had greatly declined by the sixteenth century; their survival in the west of Ireland, as in the Scottish Isles, was facilitated by local conditions, among them the abundance of bays and islands.

== Characteristics ==
No archeological remains have been found which would enable a detailed reconstruction of the Irish galley. There are, however, illustrations on Irish maps of the Elizabethan period, and these are supplemented by written accounts. There is also a carving in the old Cistercian monastery on Clare Island (Oileán Chliara), home of the seafaring O'Malleys. The carving, though very simple, shows a vessel remarkably similar to images of its Scottish equivalent, being an oared, single-masted ship with a yard for a single square sail.

Maps from the later sixteenth century, however, show differences from the vessel shown in the carving. This may reflect foreign influences, since Irish galleys traded to Spain and Portugal.

Some of the most detailed images of Irish galleys are on a map of east Ulster made around 1602. It is a map by Richard Bartlett or a copy thereof. The ships depicted have long hulls, high transoms, and rudders. They have long projecting prows, with fairly sizable cabins on the poop deck. Each ship has one mast, each with a crow's nest, and a triangular sail resembling a lugsail. The rigging, with its stays, shrouds, sheets and tacks, braces, lifts and blocks, is unremarkable. The oars are prominent, with roughly ten per side, forming a single bank along a great part of the hull. The vessels resemble those described by English mariners of the time, and are crowded with men.

Two maps of Ulster made by the Elizabethan cartographer Francis Jobson around 1590 show vessels similar to that described above, together with conventional English sailing ships. On one of these maps ("ploated for her Ma[jesty] in anno 1590") two galleys are shown, one in the northwest, the other in the northeast. Each has eight oars, and both resemble Bartlett's images (though in a somewhat simplified form) with regard to the hull and the rigging. The first galley has two masts, one a main-mast with a vertically striped square sail and crow's-nest, the other a foremast with a triangular sail. The second galley has a single mast with what appears to be a lugsail. The second map shows three more very similar oared and sail-carrying vessels.

A third map of Ulster by Jobson, dated 1598, shows three galleys, each with eight oars and two with a foremast carrying a sloping spar. A third carries a topsail on the main-mast. As with the vessels described above, the forestay descends to a beak, with a cabin aft.

The detail of the galleys matches the other sailing vessels shown. Galleys were hardly used in the Elizabethan navy, and thus is unlikely that the galleys are English.

It has been argued that for trading voyages, including those to the Iberian Peninsula, the Irish would have used sturdy vessels of the caravel type, a view supported by the galleys depicted.

The seal of John Moidartach (from Scotland, 1572)

There is pictorial evidence that by the end of the sixteenth century similar influences may have affected the design of the Scottish galley. A carving made at Arisaig in 1641 shows a vessel with a lowered stem and stern. Bartlett's map (referred to above) shows "fleetes of the Redshanks [Highlanders] of Cantyre" carrying what resembles a lugsail on a sloping yard, with a small cabin at the stern projecting backwards. Two Clanranald seals attached to documents dated 1572 show a birlinn with raised decks at stem and stern, a motif repeated in later heraldic devices. If such changes occurred, it is possible that they reflect (as in Ireland) influences from the south-east and ultimately from the Mediterranean.

== Construction ==
It is reasonable to assume that galleys in both western Scotland and the West of Ireland were built in accordance with well-established shipwrights' techniques of north-west Europe, of which the Norse were major exponents. There was extensive Norse settlement both on the west coast of Scotland and around the coasts of Ireland. Norse shipwrights attached both the stem and stern to the keel with scarf joints, the hull itself being clinker-built with iron nails. Ribs were attached to the strakes with cords or trenails, and thwarts installed. The mast was then inserted in the mast step. The stem and stern posts would have notches to receive the ends of planks, and knees secured the thwarts.

Certain images of Scottish ships appear to show vessels built in accordance with these techniques. They were clinker-built, open-decked amidships, single-masted and oared. The major difference is that, unlike Norse ships of the classical period, they had a rudder attached to a steep transom. From the evidence available, it is likely that Irish galleys resembled their Scottish equivalents in their basic construction, rigging, steering and means of propulsion, though in both cases allowance must be made for advances in design (see previous section).

== Use ==
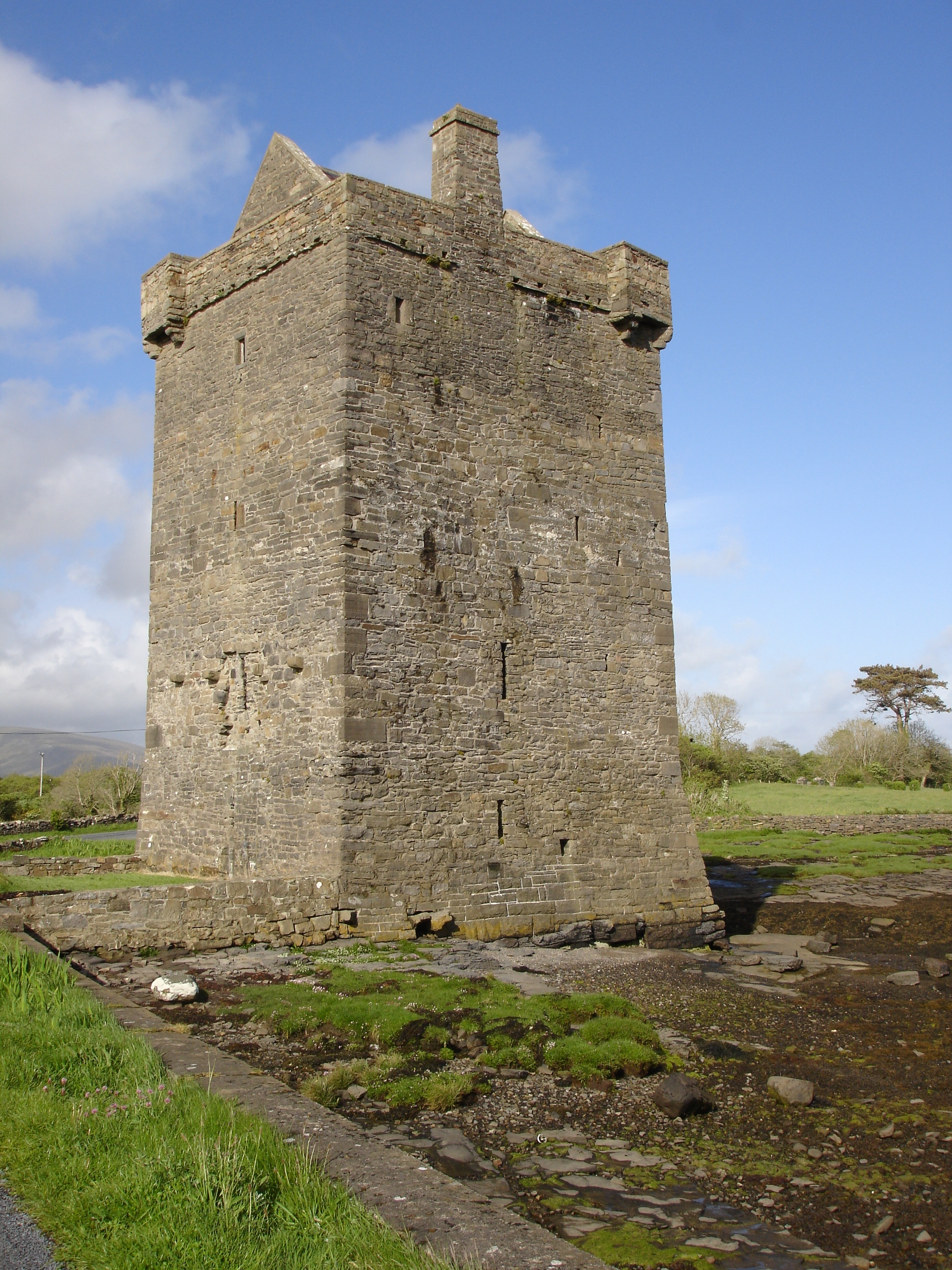
Rockfleet Castle (Caisleán Charraig an Chabhlaigh – "castle of the rock of the fleet"), an O'Malley stronghold

References are found in the Annals of the Four Masters to Irish fleets of the period in which the galley was dominant. In 1413, for example, Tuathal Ó Máille, a member of the O'Malley family, was returning to Mayo from Ulster when his fleet of seven ships was overtaken by anfadh na mara (a sea tempest) and driven northwards to Scotland. Only Tuathal survived.

The O'Malleys and the O'Flahertys, lords of west Connacht, were the main users of galleys, which they used for plundering or for transporting the troops of other chieftains. In the sixteenth century the Crown made a determined attempt to suppress the Irish fleets with its own ships. In December 1559 the following was recorded in the English State Papers:

"There are three very good galleys with Tibbot ne Longe [Irish: Tiobóid na Long, lit. 'Theobald of the Ships'], sone to Grany O'Malley, his brother and O'Malley that will carry 300 men apiece. These, if employed by Her Majesty, would do much good in the north, and the O'Malleys are much feared everywhere by sea. There are no galleys in Ireland but these [i.e. there are no galleys to compare with these]."

Grany O'Malley or Grace O'Malley (Irish: Gráinne Ní Mháille) was the most famous of the seafaring chieftains. The Governor of Connacht, Sir Richard Bingham, wrote of her in 1591 that she had twenty ships, though it is uncertain whether this was her usual complement. She, like her father before her, was a notable merchant by sea.

These ships were used for the export of salted and pickled fish, linen, wool, hides and tallow. From Spain and Portugal they would import copper, silk, wine, figs, pomegranates, cumin, cinnamon and saffron.

It is likely that such ships were not as large as the English galleon. They were certainly vulnerable to cannon fire (their light construction meant they could carry no great guns themselves), though they could easily hold their own with English craft of a similar size.
