= Cairbre mac Cinaedh =

Cairbre mac Cinaedh, King of Umaill, died 847.

Almost nothing appears to be known of Cairbre. The Annals of the Four Masters record his death in 847.

Preceded by Cosgrach mac Flannbhrath	King of Umaill ?–847	Succeeded by Gilla na nInghen Ua Cobhthaigh
