= William Ó Máille =

Liam O Mallie, inspiration for the character of Christy Mahon in The Playboy of the Western World, fl. 1873.

O Maille lived two miles west of the townland of Callow in Murvey, Connemara. In January 1873 he accidentally killed his father during a fight. He fled the scene, eventually making his way to Inishmore, staying with relatives in Cill Ronan. He was eventually able to escape to the United States, where he was later joined by his wife.

John Millington Synge used O Maille as the basis for this character, Christy Mahon.

== See also ==
- Kings of Umaill
