= Dunghal mac Flaithniadh =

Dunghal mac Flaithniadh, King of Umaill, died 776.

Dunghal's relationship to the previous king, Flannabhra, is unknown, as he does not seem to appear in the extant genealogies.

== See also ==
- Óró Sé do Bheatha 'Bhaile

Preceded by Flannabhra	King of Umaill; 773–776	Succeeded by Aedhghal
