= Anne Chambers (author) =

Irish writer

Anne Chambers is an Irish biographer, novelist, and screenplay writer who lives and works in Dublin, and is best known for her biography of the 16th-century Irish Pirate Queen, Grace O'Malley.

== Early life and education ==
Chambers grew up in Castlebar, Ireland. She has a master's degree in history from University College Cork.

Chambers initially worked as an executive at Central Bank, but left the job to pursue writing.

== Writing career ==
Chambers published a biography of Grace O'Malley (Gráinne Ní Mháille) in 1979. She has subsequently written several adaptations of this biography, including a play, a biopic, and a screenplay for a six part mini-series, which as of November 2022 was in development with Kristen Sheridan.

Chambers received the Wild Atlantic Words Hall of Fame Award in 2018.

== Books ==
- Grace O'Malley : The Biography of Ireland's Pirate Queen 1530-1603 (1979); Gill.
- Shadow Lord (2007); biography of Tibbot ne Long Bourke, 1st Viscount Mayo, Gráinne Ní Mháille's youngest son.
- Finding Tom Cruise (2007)
- Eleanor Countess of Desmond (2011)
- T.K. Whitaker: Portrait of a Patriot (2014)
- The Great Leviathan: the life of Howe Peter Browne, 2nd Marquess of Sligo (1788-1845)
