= Seven: The Days Long Gone =

2017 video game

- Developers: IMGN.PRO; Fool's Theory
- Publisher: IMGN.PRO
- Engine: Unreal Engine 4
- Platforms: Microsoft Windows, PlayStation 4
- Release: Windows; WW: 1 December 2017; Enhanced Edition (PlayStation 4, Windows); WW: 26 March 2019
- Genre: Role-playing
- Mode: Single-player

Seven: The Days Long Gone is an open world science-fantasy-themed role-playing video game developed by IMGN.PRO and Fool's Theory. It was released on 1 December 2017, and has been released on Steam, GOG.com and Humble.

The game does not have one clear genre, with Brendon Calswell from Rock Paper Shotgun calling it a mix of "cyberpunk or technofantasy". It is played from an isometric perspective. The player character is a thief, and gameplay elements are reminiscent of Thief and Assassin's Creed, with stealth, assassination and rooftop parkour. The game contains music by Miracle of Sound and Marcin Przybyłowicz, who also collaborated to provide music for the game's trailer.

It was nominated for "Best Original Soundtrack Album" at the 16th Annual Game Audio Network Guild Awards. On 26 March 2019, the game was released as Seven: Enhanced Edition on the PlayStation 4 and as a free update to the Windows version. The Enhanced Edition includes the game along with its expansion pack, Drowned Past, and fixes for the original game's bugs.

== Reception ==
Seven: The Days Long Gone received mixed reviews on release. On Metacritic, the game holds a score of 68/100 based on 35 reviews. IGN gave the game a 4/10, criticizing the game's combat and stealth mechanics while also declaring it as "remarkably buggy." PC Gamer was more positive on the game, giving it a score of 81% and praising the variety of choices afforded to the player in its gameplay.
