= Flannabhra =

Flannabhra, King of Umaill, died 773.

Flannabhra was lord of Umaill, the area around Clew Bay in what is now County Mayo. He is the first historically accepted king.

His pedigree is Flannbhra mac Cumusgrach mac Aongus mac Seachnusach mac Eochaidh Sine mac Tuathal mac Airmedach mac Conall Oirisen mac Brian Orbsen, connecting them to the Ui Briuin of Connacht. Both Knox and subsequent historians regard the relationship to the Ui Briuin to be a fiction, designed to give them an acceptable alliance with the Ui Briuin, who were Kings of Connacht

His great-grandson, Maille mac Conall, would become the ancestor and eponym of the Ó Máille clan.

== See also ==
- Grace O'Malley, c.1530-c.1603, "Pirate Queen of Connacht."
- Óró Sé do Bheatha 'Bhaile

Regnal titles
Unknown	King of Umaill ?–773	Succeeded by Dunghal mac Flaithniadh
