= Castlekirk =

- Caisleán na Circe (Irish)
- Hen's Castle
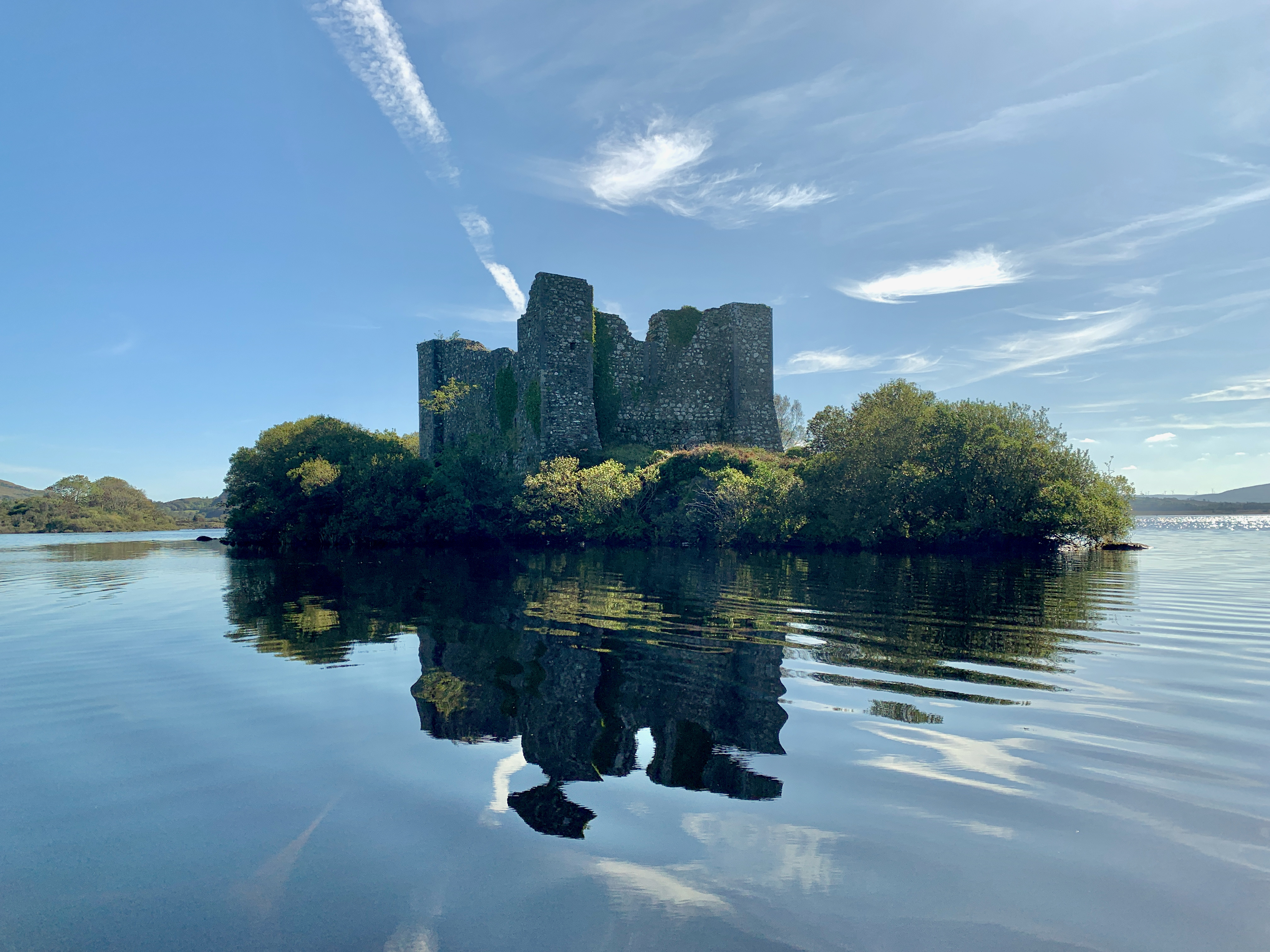

- Location within Ireland
- 53.492530°N 9.513332°W
- Type: tower house
- Location: Castlekirk Island Lough Corrib, County Galway, Ireland

History
- Built: before 1118

Site notes
- Owner: State

National monument of Ireland
- Official name: Castlekirk Castle
- Reference no.: 245

Castlekirk, also called Hen's Castle, is a tower house and National Monument located in Lough Corrib, Ireland.

== Location ==
Castlekirk is located on a tiny island (0.18 ha or ½ acre) in the northwest corner of Lough Corrib, on the approach to Maum.

== History ==
The castle was built early in the 12th century by the sons of Ruaidrí na Saide Buide (d. 1118) aided by William FitzAldelm and is one of the oldest mortared castles in Ireland.

The Lord Justice Sir Edmond Butler, in 1225, caused Odo O'Flatherty to give up Castlekirk to Aedh Ua Conchobair, King of Connaught; for assurance of his fidelity. The castle was knocked down by Fedlimid, son of Cathal Crobhdearg Ua Conchobair in 1233.

Gráinne Ní Mháille in 1546, at the age of sixteen, married Dónal an-Chogaidh O'Flaherty who, because of his aggressive behaviour, got the nickname ‘the Cock’ and she was in turn was called ‘the Hen’. When Donal was murdered she fought back with fury and with such determination the castle became known as ‘Hen’s Castle’, the name it still bears.

It continued to be occupied as a castle until it finally succumbed to Cromwellian soldiers in 1654.

In the 19th century this ruin was vandalised and its stones were removed to build houses in the area.

== Legends ==
According to legend, the castle was built in a night by a cock and a hen. The Chief of the Name of Clan Ó Flaithbheartaigh and Lord of Iar Connaught, hired a witch to build it using magic. In a day and a night of casting spells she succeeded in creating the castle. She left a magic hen to look after it, warning that as long as the hen was looked after, the castle would remain secure. Everything went well until severe weather made life difficult and the inhabitants were forced to eat the hen.

Lady Jane Wilde tells of the folklore associated with Hen's Castle. In her work published in 1888, "Speranza" wrote the following:

Strange lights are sometimes seen flitting through it, and on some particular midnight a crowd of boats gather round it, filled with men dressed in green with red sashes. And they row about till the cock crows, when they suddenly vanish and the cries of children are heard in the air. Then the people know that there has been a death somewhere in the region, and that the Sidhe have been stealing the young mortal children, and leaving some ill-favoured brat in the cradle in place of the true child.

== Description ==
The rocks slope abruptly into the water on all sides.
