= Miracle of Sound =

Irish Musician (born 1980)

Gavin Dunne
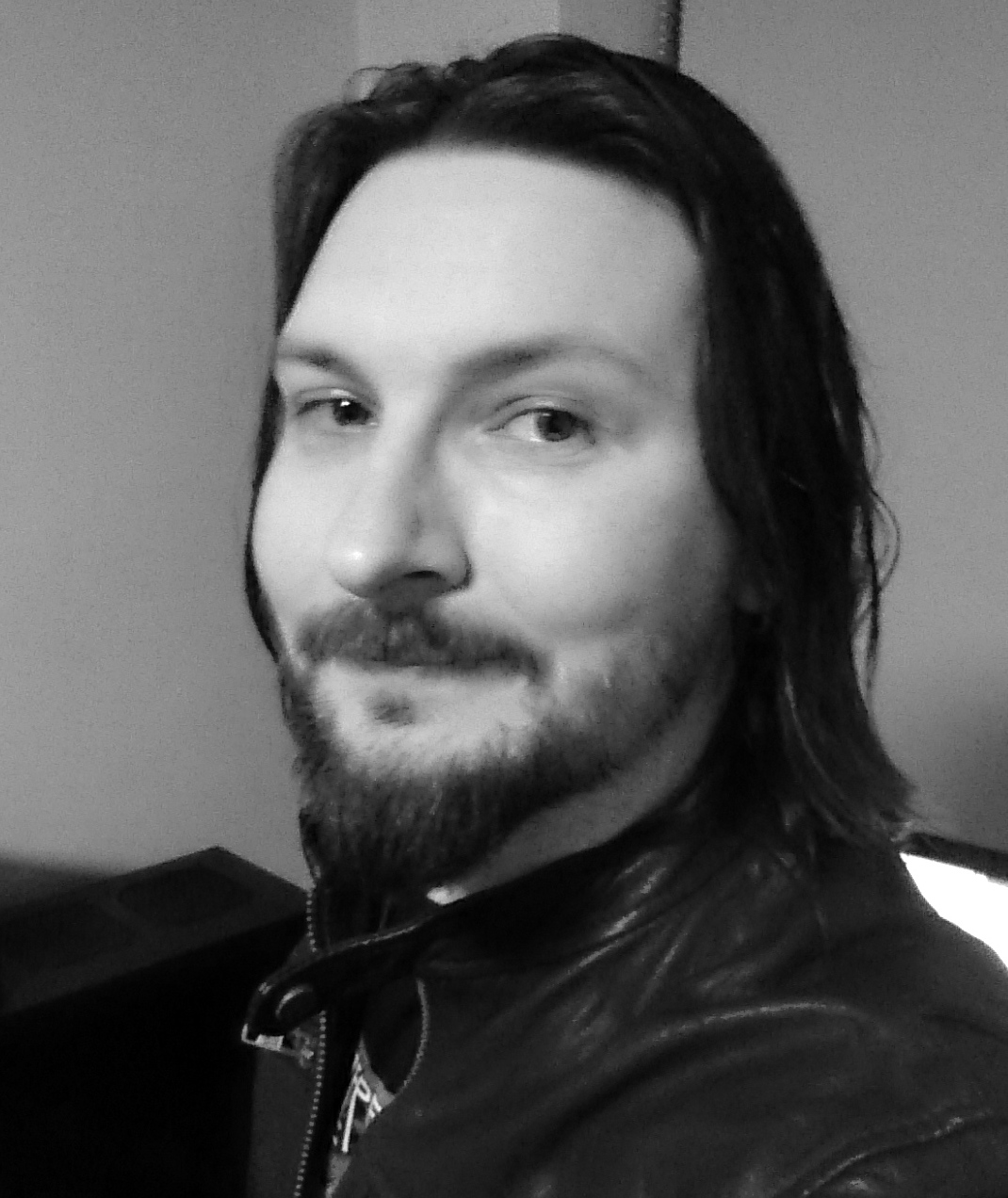
- Dunne in 2015

Background information
- Born: Gavin Dunne; 6 May 1980 (age 46); Cork, Ireland
- Origin: Ireland
- Genres: Video game music; rock; pop; electronic rock; hard rock; heavy metal; Alternative rock; dubstep; jazz; doo-wop
- Years active: 2010–present
- Website: www.miracleofsound.rocks

YouTube information
- Channel: miracleofsound
- Years active: 2007–present
- Genre: Music
- Subscribers: 1.2 million
- Views: 1.03 billion
- Last updated: 3 September 2026

Gavin Dunne (born 6 May 1980), better known by the name of his music project "Miracle of Sound", is an Irish indie musician known for his music inspired by video games, films, and TV shows. While not widely known in his home country of Ireland, his music is very popular with the online gaming community, and he has been described as one of Ireland's most successful indie musicians. Miracle of Sound is generally a one-man-band, though Dunne occasionally collaborates with other musicians and singers. His songs vary widely in genre, typically using a genre that best fits the song's subject; these have included rock, pop, electronic rock, hard rock, heavy metal, alternative rock, tribal music, nordic neofolk, dubstep, jazz, and doo-wop.

== History ==
=== Early life and origins of Miracle of Sound ===
Dunne is the son of late Irish poet Seán Dunne and is from Cork, Ireland. Before starting Miracle of Sound, Dunne spent 15 years playing in various groups.

As part of his previous band, Lotus Lullaby, he and his bandmates competed in and won the Bank of Ireland National Student Music Awards in 2006, as well as the Murphy's Battle of the Bands earlier the same year.

After the break-up of Lotus Lullaby, Dunne became inspired by the video games he was playing and wrote several songs based on his favourite games, intended on conveying the atmosphere of the game or the mood of the characters. He began with the song "Gordon Freeman Saved My Life", based on the character from the Half-Life franchise. The song amassed 15,000 views in one night on YouTube, something Dunne had struggled to do for years. He continued with "The Ballad of Clay Carmine", which had another positive reception, and Dunne realised that he had found a significant niche audience and he continued to write songs based on video games.

One of these early songs, "Commander Shepard", based on the character from the Mass Effect series of the same name, went viral and eventually amassed millions of views, leading to a rapid rise in popularity for the musician.

=== Coordination with game developers ===
Following his success with "Commander Shepard", Dunne eventually met with the marketing team from BioWare, the creative team behind the Mass Effect series, while he was at Gamescom in Germany in August 2011. There he released another Mass Effect song, "Normandy", based on the ending of Mass Effect 2. Coordinating with BioWare, Dunne became involved in the marketing campaign for the next game in the series, Mass Effect 3. Both voice actors for the male and the female Commander Shepard in the Mass Effect series (Mark Meer and Jennifer Hale, respectively) performed dramatic readings of parts of the song "Commander Shepard" before the release of the Mass Effect 3, to raise publicity. BioWare subsequently sent Dunne advance footage for use in making a song and accompanying music video based on Mass Effect 3, so that his release of "Take it Back" could coincide with the game's launch. A line from his song "Commander Shepard" was also referenced in Mass Effect 3, with a character telling the player to "fight like a Krogan." Dunne later made two additional songs based on the game; "Crucible" and "Kalros".

Some of his songs have also been used within videogames. His song based on the indie role-playing video game Wasteland 2, titled "Cries of a Dead World" was included in the game itself, being used for the end credits. One of Miracle of Sound's earliest songs, "Gordon Freeman Saved My Life", was later included as a playable song in the game Rock Band. His song "Keepers", in collaboration with Marcin Przybyłowicz, was written for the game Seven: The Days Long Gone and is the official theme song of the isometric RPG, and was used in the game's trailer.

=== Music and reception by critics ===
In traditional video game style, his albums are named in increasing levels – Level 1, Level 2 and so on. However, he has also released two other non-gaming-related albums. His seventh album, Metal Up, a heavy metal compilation with some songs based on Irish folklore, topped the iTunes Metal chart for 2 days following its release in early 2015. Metal Up was described as mix of classic rock, hard rock, and metal, and was praised by Firstherd for its Celtic influences in some songs which were "very original when placed in a metal framework". The album was also given a 5 out of 5 score by Rock Review.

Shortly before the Wasteland 2 Director's Cut re-release in 2015, Dunne released a parody of the Dire Straits song "Money for Nothing", titled "I want my RPG". The lyrics of the song criticise modern free-to-play games, microtransactions and downloadable content and express the desire for more games of the old CRPG style. He did not include the song on any album, saying on Twitter that "It's a parody of someone else's song. Wouldn't feel right to monetise it." Dunne has also used his music to criticise quick time events in his Resident Evil 6 song "Wigglesticks". It has been suggested that other indie games on limited budgets could improve the quality of their music by employing indie musicians such as Miracle of Sound.

Many of his songs have received very positive reviews, such as his doo-wop song "Going Nuclear", based on the then-upcoming game Fallout 4, which drew praise from video game journalists for matching the tone and style of the game's aesthetic very well. His song "The Lucky Ones" was considered unique by being written from the point of view of the background characters, rather than the player characters of Tom Clancy's The Division. He has written two songs about the Uncharted franchise "Keep Drifting" and "Here we go Again", inspired by the main character's sense of adventure and being a drifter at heart. Nerdist reviewed his song "Get the Gang Back", based on the popular Blizzard game Overwatch, and called it "an incredibly catchy tune" with the lyrics "mirroring the game's relentlessly positive outlook".

In late 2016, he released "Pawns of War", a Battlefield 1 inspired song where Dunne's goal was to fuse the feel of the game's soundtrack with old military marching tunes, creating a composition that focuses on soldiers doomed to be forgotten after being thrown into the "meat grinder" of WWI.

=== Collaborative works ===
Dunne generally works alone, performing or electronically creating all of the instrument tracks for his music and layering the result to create a single track. He provides most of the vocals for his songs himself, plays guitar, bass and keyboard, and can use electronic programs for drums and many other instruments, including orchestral pieces. However, he has collaborated with other artists at times for vocals or other instruments that he cannot play or create electronically.

He has worked with several guest vocalists; with Malukah on the song "Legends of the Frost", with Irish singer Ailín Kennedy on "Lady of Worlds", with YouTuber Sharm on "Fires Fade", "Mother of Flame", and "Machine Hearts", with Lorna Dollery on "Dream of the Sky", "Dream of Goodbye", and "Evacuate", and with singer Karliene on songs such as "Ascension", "Lilac & Violet", and "My Odyssey". He has also worked with Elizabeth Zharoff on "Purest gold".

He has been featured in the songs of several other artists, including Dan Bull's "Metro: Last Light Rap", "Overwatch Rap", and "Last Guardian Rap", TryHardNinjas' "Calling All Ghosts", 331Erock's "Deadpool Meets Metal", as well as JT Machinimas' "Let Your Soul Walk Free" and "Shepherd of this Flock".

He also had guest musicians Jack O'Rourke (piano) and Gary Baus (saxophone) perform for his jazz song "Sweet L.A.", and guest musician Gwen Boyle (violin) on "Dream of the Sky". For his album Metal Up he had two guest musicians, 331Erock and Dave Divilly, who provided guitar solos for "I am Alive" and "Get Your Metal On", respectively.

From November 2014 to September 2019, Dunne joined video game critic James Stephanie Sterling and gaming journalist Laura Kate Dale (Laura K Buzz on social media) on a weekly podcast, the Podquisition, which primarily discussed video game and pop culture related news. He left the show after episode 250, citing being blocked on Twitter by unnamed figures in the videogame industry who had been criticized by Sterling and/or Dale on the podcast.

In late May 2018, Gavin was featured as a guest artist on the Dark Souls-inspired titular track "Let There Be Fire" from the album of the same name by Florida-based musician Aviators. In late June 2019, Aviators featured as a guest artists on the Bloodborne-inspired track "A Thousand Eyes".

He and other musicians were invited by CD Projekt musical director Marcin Przybyłowicz to participate in a music video that recreates The Witcher 3: Wild Hunt main theme to celebrate the game's 5th anniversary in 2020.

=== Sale and distribution of music ===
From 2011 until February 2015, Dunne released new music videos on The Escapist (an online video gaming website) every two to four weeks, in addition to releasing them on his YouTube channel.

Views on YouTube for Dunne have continued to grow, with around 4 million YouTube views per month, and with total views of over 254 million as of July 2019. He makes the majority of his income with sales of his songs and albums on Bandcamp and iTunes, as well as monetisation of his YouTube videos. He has taken an unusual approach to piracy, and has said that he is fine with people pirating his music if they are poor or broke, and encourages them to tell their friends about him, credit him if they use his music, and buy it when they can.

In late 2013, multiple copyright strikes were issued by YouTube against Dunne's videos for use of his own music, as well as against other users who had used his music in their videos with permission. All of the strikes were initiated by INDMUSIC, on behalf of TuneCore, the company that distributed Miracle of Sound's songs at the time. Though the incident was resolved successfully, Dunne commented that although TuneCore was trying to help artists, their efforts did more damage than good and that he depends on let's plays and gaming videos to spread and popularise his music by word of mouth.

== Personal life ==
In November 2019, Dunne announced that in August he had married his partner after 11 years.

== Discography ==
=== Albums and songs ===
- 2011 — Level 1

No.	Title	Length
1.	"The New Black Gold"	4:51
2.	"Sovngarde Song"	5:34
3.	"Commander Shepard"	3:28
4.	"Big Ten"	2:46
5.	"Sweet L.A."	4:04
6.	"Wheatley's Song"	3:35
7.	"Redemption Blues"	4:06
8.	"Age of the Dragon"	3:57
9.	"Little Sister"	4:43
10.	"Mining All Day Long"	3:09
11.	"The Mind of the Bat"	3:48
12.	"Normandy"	5:00
13.	"The Dead Don't Shuffle (They Run)"	3:58
14.	"Wasteland Soul"	4:30
15.	"Brothers of the Creed"	4:11
16.	"Beauty Bleak"	4:00
17.	"I Suck at Call of Duty"	3:34
18.	"Necromorph Soup"	2:40
19.	"Gordon Freeman Saved My Life"	3:39
20.	"She Gonna Teach Ya (How to Rock N Roll)"	3:19
21.	"Santiago's Lament"	3:49
22.	"Zombie Holiday"	3:10
23.	"Goodbye Black Ops"	3:18
24.	"Duke, You Used to Be Cool"	4:37
25.	"Fire in Your Hole"	3:31
26.	"Comin' For Your Tank"	3:31
27.	"Thunder's Theme – Full Version"	2:13
28.	"The Grind"	3:23
29.	"Mortal Kombat Party"	3:23
30.	"Second Chance Song"	3:41
31.	"Trip to Vegas"	2:36
32.	"The Ballad of Clay Carmine"	4:29
33.	"Thunder Mountain"	1:47
Total length:		122:20

- 2012 — Level 2

No.	Title	Length
1.	"Take It Back – Extended Cut"	4:28
2.	"Nord Mead"	3:10
3.	"Joker's Song"	3:34
4.	"Shadows in the Moonlight"	4:00
5.	"Shooter Guy"	4:27
6.	"Legends of the Frost ft. Malukah"	2:45
7.	"Life in Bullet Time"	4:40
8.	"Crucible"	3:33
9.	"Silver and Steel"	3:05
10.	"DNA"	3:38
11.	"Keep Drifting"	4:11
12.	"Give Them Hell"	2:21
13.	"You Died"	3:03
14.	"Kalros"	3:32
15.	"Khajiit Like to Sneak"	3:16
16.	"Binary Divide"	4:20
17.	"Survivorcraft Theme"	1:06
18.	"Back in Time"	3:07
Total length:		62:16

- 2013 — Level 3

No.	Title	Length
1.	"City of Night"	4:01
2.	"Breaking Down the Borders"	2:47
3.	"Rise"	3:48
4.	"Dream of the Sky"	6:25
5.	"Reclaimer"	3:43
6.	"Halfman's Song"	3:16
7.	"Calamity"	4:01
8.	"The Savage Side of Me"	3:52
9.	"The Best I Can"	4:08
10.	"Distant Honor"	3:54
11.	"Motor Girl"	2:36
12.	"His Father's Son"	3:27
13.	"Wigglesticks"	0:44
14.	"The Call of Duty Circus"	3:07
15.	"Blood of the Creed"	2:01
16.	"The Spy Who Survived"	3:36
17.	"Doorfighter"	1:03
18.	"Hell in the Headspace"	3:33
19.	"Roll Out"	3:58
20.	"Hengsha"	2:43
Total length:		66:43

- 2013 — Level 4

No.	Title	Length
1.	"The Crush"	3:46
2.	"Beneath the Black Flag"	2:40
3.	"The Call"	4:17
4.	"Forever Blue"	4:13
5.	"Higher Tonight"	3:23
6.	"Kickback"	3:53
7.	"Digital Shadow"	3:49
8.	"The Day the World Died"	3:51
9.	"Drive"	3:23
10.	"Rampage"	2:47
11.	"Hard Cash"	4:11
12.	"Cries of a Dead World"	2:39
13.	"My Iron Skin"	3:21
14.	"The Best of Us"	6:09
15.	"Hammers in My Head"	3:16
16.	"Nameless"	3:00
17.	"Niko It's Your Cousin"	3:19
18.	"Co-Optional"	1:34
19.	"The New Black Gold 2013"	4:39
Total length:		68:10

- 2014 — Level 5

No.	Title	Length
1.	"Welcome Home"	3:57
2.	"Wake the White Wolf"	3:46
3.	"Amnesia"	5:11
4.	"My Revolution"	4:15
5.	"All as One"	5:18
6.	"A Dog's Life"	3:58
7.	"Cataclysm"	4:57
8.	"Messing with the Best"	3:28
9.	"Perseverance"	2:58
10.	"Uncivil War"	1:40
11.	"Dream of Goodbye"	5:21
12.	"Every Time You Look Around"	4:08
13.	"Shadow of the Ash (Hard Vox)"	4:08
14.	"Fires Far"	5:03
15.	"Jet Black Dress"	3:41
16.	"Breathe"	3:01
17.	"Into the Mind"	4:31
18.	"Fistful of Concrete"	4:01
19.	"Call of Home"	5:32
20.	"Resistance"	4:53
21.	"When Winter Comes"	4:12
22.	"Machine"	2:22
23.	"Man and Machine"	4:01
24.	"The Strut"	2:55
25.	"Ploughing a Troll"	2:10
26.	"Voice of a New Age"	2:44
27.	"Cries of a Dead World (Wasteland 2 Credits version)"	2:51
28.	"Digital Shadow"	3:49
29.	"Shadow of the Ash (Soft Vox)"	4:06
30.	"Wake the White Wolf (Metal Version)"	3:46
Total length:		116:13

- 2014 — Vistas

No.	Title	Length
1.	"38th Street"	2:48
2.	"4am"	2:40
3.	"Hitoshio"	2:16
4.	"Electric Sky"	1:54
5.	"Manhattan Midnight"	2:29
6.	"Cosmic Slum"	2:48
7.	"Gougane Barra"	2:07
8.	"Downtime"	2:34
9.	"Kakolukia"	2:59
10.	"Lover Stone"	2:33
11.	"Sunny Day Part 1"	1:58
12.	"Sunny Day Part 2"	1:57
13.	"Nimbus"	1:55
14.	"Ocean Hotel"	3:26
15.	"The Call (Instrumental Version)"	4:17
Total length:		38:41

- 2015 — Metal Up

No.	Title	Length
1.	"Sirona"	5:39
2.	"I Am Alive ft. 331Erock"	4:18
3.	"Next Empty Page"	3.41
4.	"Convalescence"	5:25
5.	"Celebrate and Rejoice"	4:18
6.	"Compulsion"	4:53
7.	"Gráinne Mhaol, Queen of Pirates"	3:05
8.	"Get Your Metal On"	2:37
9.	"Spin the Venn Wheels"	5:54
10.	"Into the Nothing"	3:48
11.	"Mother Earth"	11:44
Total length:		55:17

- 2015 — Level 6

No.	Title	Length
1.	"Don't Say a Word"	3:38
2.	"London Town"	3:58
3.	"Lady of Worlds"	4:52
4.	"Road Rage"	3:49
5.	"Stay by My Side"	3:55
6.	"Going Nuclear"	1:59
7.	"Friends"	3:48
8.	"I Am the Night"	3:38
9.	"Evacuate"	3:49
10.	"My Shooting Star"	4:16
11.	"Paleblood Moon"	4:30
12.	"Friends to Foes"	4:54
13.	"Metasonic"	4:31
14.	"I Am Pudge"	2:54
15.	"Hard Cash 2015"	4:11
Total length:		58:42

- 2016 — Level 7

No.	Title	Length
1.	"The Natural Heart"	3:56
2.	"The Path"	4:01
3.	"Get The Gang Back"	3:15
4.	"The Man Who Rocked the World"	4:27
5.	"Skellige Winds"	2:29
6.	"Hell to Pay"	3:17
7.	"Pawns of War"	2:36
8.	"Fires Fade"	5:58
9.	"Clockworks"	4:22
10.	"Some Things Never Change"	5:10
11.	"Edge of the World"	4:21
12.	"The Lucky Ones"	3:59
13.	"Mother of Flame"	3:59
14.	"Jet Fuel Heart"	3:01
15.	"Forever Flame"	4:11
16.	"Kana"	3:01
17.	"Numbers"	2:55
18.	"Ditto"	4:48
19.	"Here We Go Again"	3:34
20.	"Sovngarde Song 2016"	5:58
21.	"Fires Fade (Male Version)"	5:54
Total length:		85:12

- 2017 — Level 8

No.	Title	Length
1.	"The Great Unknown"	5:09
2.	"Keepers (feat. Marcin Przybyłowicz)"	3:20
3.	"The Moment (feat. Karliene)"	3:53
4.	"Upside Down"	4:10
5.	"When The Wolves Cry Out"	4:17
6.	"Into The Wild"	3:55
7.	"Force of Nature (feat. Sarah Murray)"	4:05
8.	"Replica"	4:19
9.	"Hallowed Land"	3:29
10.	"No One (feat. Karliene)"	3:27
11.	"Welcome to the Family"	2:54
12.	"Break of Dawn"	3:53
13.	"We Are War"	3:39
14.	"Revolution Spark"	3:52
15.	"Another Round of Gwent"	1:19
16.	"Mother Earth 2017"	11:43
Total length:		67:24

- 2018 — Level 9

No.	Title	Length
1.	"My Odyssey"	4:11
2.	"When I Swing By"	3:12
3.	"Ode to Fury"	3:37
4.	"Ascension"	7:02
5.	"Setting Sun"	4:34
6.	"Deep Blue"	4:00
7.	"The Death of Rock 'N' Roll"	4:53
8.	"Starting Over"	2:41
9.	"Savior's Seed"	2:59
10.	"Machine Hearts"	5:41
11.	"A Father's Arms"	5:25
12.	"Embers Rise"	5:09
13.	"Dream Again"	4:44
14.	"Giants Fall"	3:24
15.	"Place in Nature"	3:03
16.	"London's Bloody Cry"	2:32
17.	"Redemption Blues 2018"	4:25
Total length:		71:32

- 2019 — Level 10

No.	Title	Length
1.	"City of Dreams"	4:15
2.	"Neon Red"	4:02
3.	"Rebirth"	5:09
4.	"Only Us (ft. Karliene)"	4:23
5.	"Show Your Style"	4:10
6.	"A Thousand Eyes (ft. Aviators)"	5:04
7.	"Payday"	4:26
8.	"Never Alone"	4:17
9.	"Back to the Start"	3:29
10.	"Open Air"	5:59
11.	"Mojave Song"	8:18
12.	"Neon Red (Instrumental Remix)"	3:39
Total length:		57:11

- 2020 — Level 11

No.	Title	Length
1.	"Beyond These Walls"	4:13
2.	"Valhalla Calling"	3:42
3.	"When Honor Dies"	5:57
4.	"City of Night 2020"	4:00
5.	"Lilac and Violet (ft. Karliene)"	4:35
6.	"Big Guts and Bigger Guns"	3:53
7.	"Liquid Nights and Disco Lights"	4:31
8.	"Through Life and Loss (ft. Sharm)"	5:41
9.	"When Forever Comes (ft. Sharm)"	4:35
10.	"Rest Your Head"	3:12
11.	"The Tale of Cú Chulainn"	8:44
12.	"A Long Year"	2:59
Total length:		56:02

- 2023 — Level 12

No.	Title	Length
1.	"To Be Better"	3:29
2.	"Superhuman"	3:10
3.	"Skal"	2:48
4.	"Perfect"	4:10
5.	"Onwards We Row"	2:32
6.	"Take It Back"	4:30
7.	"Soul Of Sand"	6:23
8.	"Fallen Leaves"	6:08
9.	"Scarlet Sky"	5:32
10.	"Moonlight Blue"	4:25
11.	"Another Day In Paradise"	3:52
12.	"New Frontier"	4:46
13.	"Valhalla Calling (Viking Metal Version)"	4:05
14.	"Another Day In Paradise (Latin Pop Version)"	3:53
15.	"Skal (Metal Version)"	3:00
Total length:		62:43

- 2024 — Remasters, Vol. 1
