= Metal Up =

Studio album by Miracle of Sound
- Released: March 31, 2015
- Recorded: 2015
- Genre: Heavy metal Rock
- Length: 55:17
- Producer: Gavin Dunne

Miracle of Sound chronology
Vistas (2014)	Metal Up (2015)	Level 6 (2015)

Metal Up is a heavy metal album by Miracle of Sound. Some of its songs are based on Irish folklore, and the album stayed at the top of the iTunes Metal charts for 2 days following its release in March 2015. Metal Up was described as mix of classic rock, hard rock, and metal, and was praised for its Celtic influences in several songs. The album was given a 5 out of 5 score in Rock Review.

In addition to Gavin Dunne, who usually works as a one-man-band, he had two guest musicians, Eric "331Erock" Calderone and Dave Divilly, who provided guitar solos for "I am Alive" and “Get Your Metal On”, respectively.

== Track listing ==
No.	Title	Length
1.	"Sirona"	05:39
2.	"I Am Alive ft. 331Erock"	04:18
3.	"Next Empty Page"	03.41
4.	"Convalescence"	05:25
5.	"Celebrate and Rejoice"	04:18
6.	"Compulsion"	04:53
7.	"Gráinne Mhaol, Queen of Pirates"	03:05
8.	"Get Your Metal On"	02:37
9.	"Spin the Venn Wheels"	05:54
10.	"Into the Nothing"	03:48
11.	"Mother Earth"	11:44
Total length:		55:17
