= Diarmaid Ó Máille =

Diarmaid Ó Máille (Dermot O'Malley), Gaelic-Irish Lord and Chief of the Name, died 1415.

Ó Máille was a member of the O'Malley family of Clew Bay in what is now County Mayo, Ireland. The Annals of the Four Masters, sub anno 1415, records how he gained the chieftainship:

A great prey was taken by O'Malley, i.e. Hugh, from Dermot O'Malley. Dermot in retaliation took O'Malley's Island, upon which Hugh went in pursuit of Dermot; and a battle was fought between them, in which Hugh O'Malley, Lord of Umallia, was slain by Dermot and his son Conor, and also the son of Thomas O'Malley, and Donnell, the son of Dermot O'Malley. The chieftainship of Umallia was thenceforth wrested from the descendants of Hugh; and Dermot assumed the lordship.

Preceded by Aodh Ó Máille	King of Umaill; 1415–14??	Succeeded by Tadhg mac Diarmaid Ó Máille
