= Beitass =

Viking ship part

A beitass, or a stretching pole, is a wooden spar used on Viking ships that was fitted into a pocket at the lower corner of the sail. This innovation was used to stiffen and hold the edge of the sail when sailing close to the wind.
