= Maille mac Conall =

9th century Irish person

Maille mac Conall, member of the Umhaill, ancestor and eponym of the O'Malley family of County Mayo.

Maille was a grandson of Cosgrach mac Flannbhrath, king of Ui Maill (died 812). He had an unnamed brother, from whom the O'Gormghaile family descend. His father's brother, Colman, is given as ancestor of an O'Colman family, while Fergus, a son of Flannabhra mac Cumusgrach (died 773), is given as an ancestor of the family of Fergus and the Muinter Rooney.

Maille himself does not appear in the Irish annals. He appears in a number of genealogical collections, such as Dubhaltach MacFhirbhisigh's Leabhar na nGenealach. Hubert T. Knox made use of this source when drawing up family trees of the Ui Mail, and gives the O'Malley genealogy in his book, The History of Mayo.

== Pedigree ==
Maille's floruit is uncertain. His descendants began using his name as a surname in the late 11th/early 12th century. The earliest members of the family to use O'Maille/O'Malley as a surname would have been his great-grandson, Dubhdara.

Knox gives a pedigree of Domnall Ruadh O Maille, king of Ui Maill, who was killed in 1337. It traces his descent from Maile thus:

Domnall Ruadh mac Brian m. Domnall m. Muiredhach m. Domnall Finn m. Muiredhach m. Dubhdara m. Muiredhach m. Dubhdara m. Flannabhra m. Seachnusach m. Maille.

The surname O Maille/O'Malley/Malley is one of the most common surnames in County Mayo, and features strongly in the area's history.
