= Kings of Umhaill =

Rulers in western Ireland

The Kings of Umaill were rulers of Umaill, a kingdom or territory located in the west of what is now County Mayo, Ireland.

Its earliest rulers were the semi-historical Tuath mhac nUmhoir. The Umaill, its early historical rulers, were renamed the Uí Briúin Umaill to claim a fictitious relationship with the Uí Briúin. By the 12th century the ruling family adopted the surname Ó Máille, and were reckoned with the Ó Dubhda, Ó Flaithbheartaigh and Mac Conraoi as supreme seafaring clans of Connacht.

== Kings of Umaill ==
- Flannabhra, died 773
- Dunghal mac Flaithniadh, died 776
- Aedhghal, died 779
- Flathghal mac Flannbhrath, died 782
- Cosgrach mac Flannbhrath, died 812
- Cairbre mac Cinaedh, died 847
- Gilla na nInghen Ua Cobhthaigh, died 1004
- Domhnall Ua Máille, died 1176
- Domnall Ruadh Ó Máille, died 11 November 1337
- Owen Ó Máille, died 1362
- Diarmuid mac Owen Ó Máille, died 1362
- Donell Ó Máille, 1401 (Donnell O'Malley, Lord of Umallia, died, after having attained to a good old age.)
- Aodh Ó Máille, died 1415
- Diarmaid Ó Máille, fl. 1415
- Tadhg mac Diarmaid Ó Máille, died 1467
- Eoghan, d. 1513
- Cormac mac Eoghan Ó Máille, died 1523 (1523. O'Maille, i.e. Cormac, son of Eoghan O'Maille, general supporter of the hospitality and nobility of the west of Connacht, mortuus est. Domhnall, son of Thomas O'Maille, assumed his place.)
- Domhnall mac Tomás Ó Máille, fl. 1523
- Eoghan Dubhdara Ó Máille, fl. 1530
- Grace O'Malley (female), c.1530–c.1603

== See also ==
- O'Malley baronets
