= Grace O'Malley =

Irish pirate and chieftain (c. 1530–1603)

- Gráinne Ní Mháille
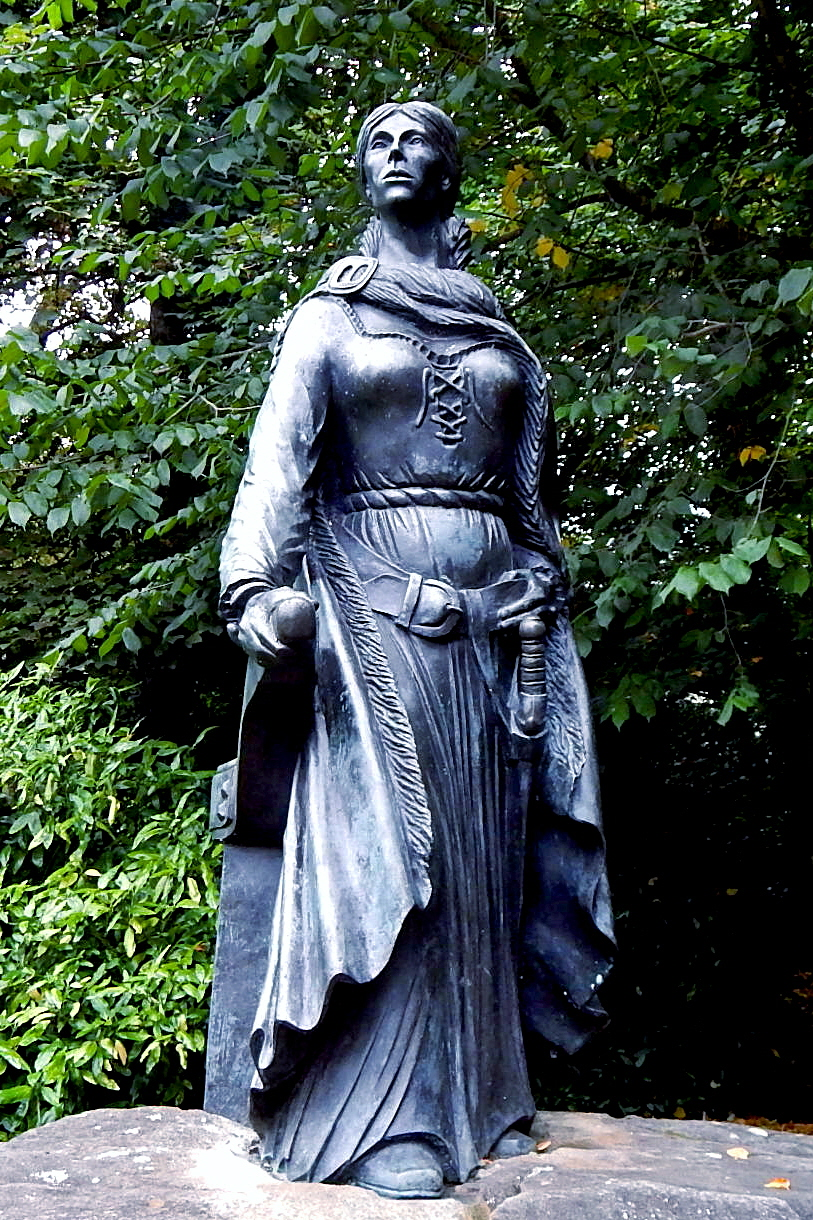
- Gráinne Mhaol Ní Mháille statue, Westport House, in Westport, County Mayo
- Born: c. 1530; Umhaill, Connacht, Ireland
- Died: c. 1603 (aged 72–73) most likely Rockfleet Castle, Ireland
- Occupations: Land-owner, sea-captain, political activist
- Spouses: Dónal an Chogaidh Ó Flaithbheartaigh; Richard "the Iron" Bourke
- Children: Eóghain Ó Flaithbertaigh, Murchad Ó Flaithbertaigh, Meaḋḃ Ní Fhlaithbertaigh, Tibbott Bourke
- Parents: Eóghan Dubhdara Ó Mháille (father); Me Ní Mháille (mother)
- Piratical career
- Nickname: Granny or Grainey O'Malley, Gráinne Mhaol, Granuaile
- Allegiance: Ó Máille
- Commands: White Seahorse
- Battles: Nine Years War (Ireland)

Gráinne O'Malley (Irish: Gráinne Ní Mháille, pronounced [ˈgˠɾˠaːn̠ʲə n̠ʲiː ˈwaːl̠ʲə]; c. 1530 – c. 1603) was the head of the Ó Máille dynasty in the west of Ireland, and the daughter of Eóghan Dubhdara Ó Máille.

Upon her father's death, she took over active leadership of the lordship by land and sea, despite having a brother, Dónal an Phíopa Ó Máille. Marriage to Dónal an Chogaidh (Donal "of the war") Ó Flaithbheartaigh brought her greater wealth and influence, reportedly owning as much as 1,000 head of cattle and horses. In 1593, when her sons Tibbot Bourke and Murchadh Ó Flaithbheartaigh (Murrough O'Flaherty) and her half-brother Dónal an Phíopa ("Donal of the Pipes") were taken captive by the English governor of Connacht, Sir Richard Bingham, O'Malley sailed to England to petition for their release. She formally presented her request to Queen Elizabeth I at her court in Greenwich Palace.

O'Malley is not mentioned in the Irish annals, so documentary evidence for her life comes mostly from English sources, especially the eighteen "Articles of Interrogatory", questions put to her in writing on behalf of Elizabeth I. She is mentioned in the English State Papers and in other documents of the kind.

In Irish folklore she is commonly known as Gráinne Mhaol (anglicised as Granuaile) and is a well-known historical figure in sixteenth-century Irish history. Her name was also rendered in contemporaneous English documents in various ways, including Gráinne O'Maly, Graney O'Mally, Granny ni Maille, Grany O'Mally, Grayn Ny Mayle, Grane ne Male, Grainy O'Maly, and Granee O'Maillie, never known as Grace O'Malley. In popular culture, she is often referred to as "The Pirate Queen".

== Early life ==
O'Malley was born in Ireland around 1530, when Henry VIII was King of England and held the title Lord of Ireland. Under the policies of the English government at the time, the semi-autonomous Irish clans were left mostly to their own devices. However, this changed over the course of O'Malley's life as the Tudor conquest of Ireland gathered pace.

Eoghan Dubhdara Ó Máille, her father, and his family were based in Clew Bay, County Mayo. He was Chief of the Name of Clan Ó Máille and Lord of Umhaill, and claimed descent from Maille mac Conall. The Uí Mháille were one of the seafaring clans of Connacht, and they had built a row of castles facing the sea to protect their territory. They controlled most of what is now the barony of Murrisk in south-west County Mayo and recognised as their nominal overlords the Mac William Íochtar branch of the Bourkes, who controlled much of what is now County Mayo. The Bourke family (Irish: de Búrca) were originally Anglo-Norman (de Burgh) but by O'Malley's lifetime had become completely Gaelicised. Her mother, Margaret or Maeve, was also an O'Malley. Although she was the only child of Dubhdara and his wife, O'Malley had a paternal half-brother called Dónal na Píopa. Although under Brehon Law only male members of the derbhfine could inherit the mantle of Chief of the Name through tanistry, O'Malley "was considered to be the legal retainer of the family land and seafaring activities".

With shore castles like Carrickkildavnet, the Clan Uí Mháille demanded and received black rent from those who fished off their coasts, which included fishermen from as far away as England. The head of the family was known simply by his surname as Ó Máille (anglicised as The O'Malley). The local oral tradition has it that O'Malley, as a young girl, wished to go on a trading expedition to Spain with her father. Upon being told she could not because her long hair would catch in the ship's ropes, she cut off most of her hair to shame her father into taking her. This earned her the nickname "Gráinne Mhaol" (Irish pronunciation: [ˈɡɾˠaːn̠ʲə ˈwiːlˠ]; from maol, meaning 'bald' or 'having cropped hair'), usually anglicised as Granuaile (/ˌɡrɔːnjuˈeɪl/ GRAWN-yoo-AYL). The nickname may also come from Gráinne Umhaill ("Gráinne of Umhall", Umhall being a historical district of west Connacht dominated by the Uí Mháille).

As a child she most likely lived at her family's residence of Belclare and Clare Island, but she may have been fostered by another family, as fosterage was traditional among the Gaelic nobility of Ireland.

== Marriage to Ó Flaithbheartaigh ==
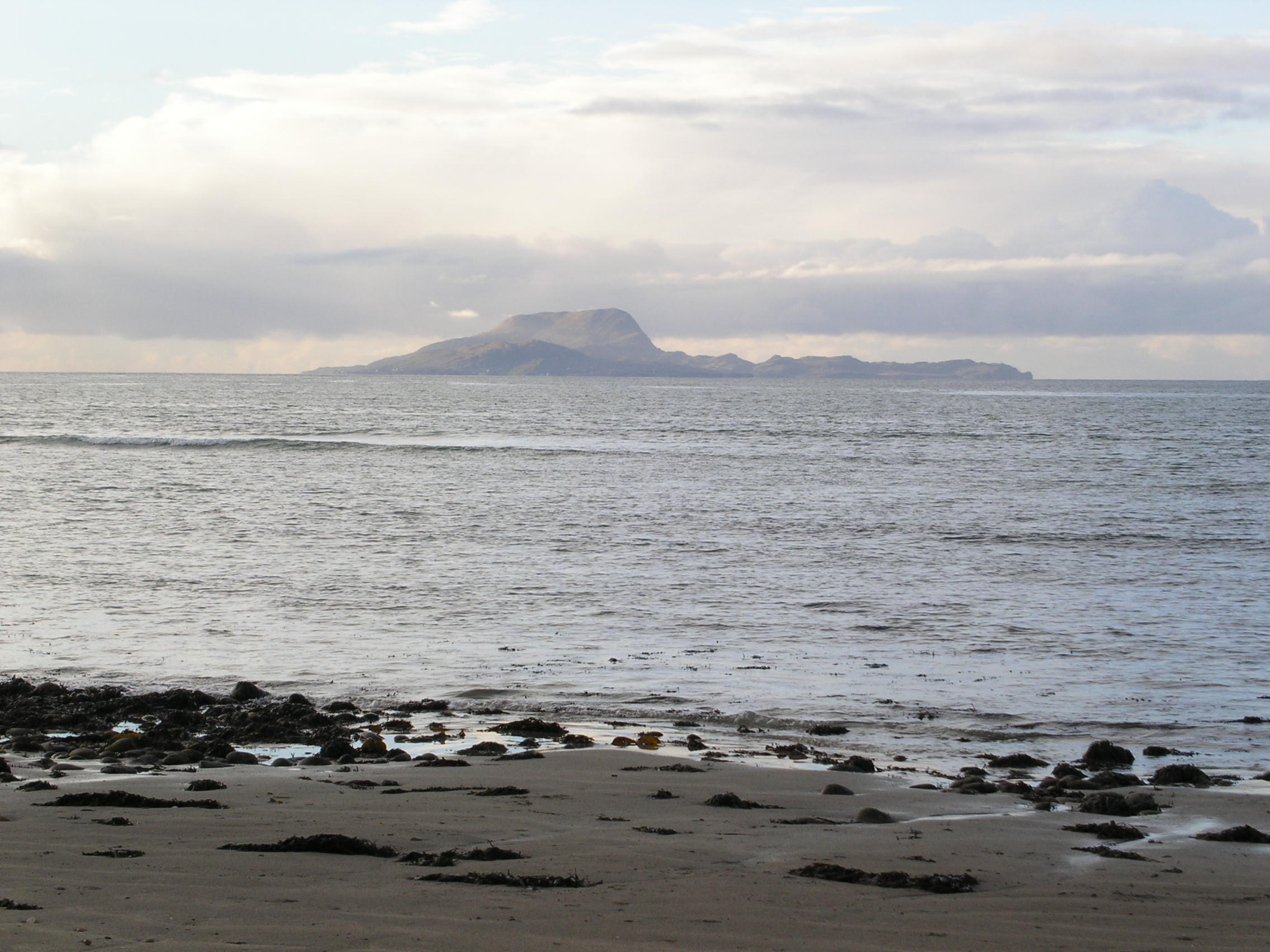
Clare Island, associated with Grace O'Malley

O'Malley was married in 1546 to Dónal an Chogaidh Ó Flaithbheartaigh, tánaiste or heir to the Chief of the Name of Clan Ó Flaithbheartaigh, which would have been a good political match for the daughter of the Chief of Clan Ó Máille. As Ó Flaithbheartaigh tánaiste, Dónal an Chogaidh had expectations of one day ruling as Lord of Iar Connacht, which was roughly equivalent to modern Connemara.

She bore three children during her marriage to Dónal an Chogaidh:

- Eóghan (Owen): The eldest child, known to be kind and forgiving. Sir Richard Bingham tricked him; Owen was murdered as a result, and Bingham and his troops took over his castle.
- Méadhbh (Maeve): Said to be much like her mother, she married Richard "the Devils Hook" Bourke, 22nd Mac William Íochtar (d.1601) with whom she had several children. O'Malley and Bourke were supposedly very close, more than once he saved her from death.
- Murchadh (Murrough): Murrough was said to take after his father, for he enjoyed warfare. He often beat his sister Maeve, and refused to listen to his mother because of her sex. Many sources report that he betrayed his family and joined forces with Sir Richard Bingham after the murder of Owen. When O'Malley heard of this she swore she would never speak to Murrough again for the rest of her life, though she would often insult him. After Dónal an Chogaidh's death, O'Malley left Iar Connacht and returned to Umhaill, taking with her many Clan Ó Flaithbheartaigh warriors.

In 1564, Dónal's ambitions were dashed when his kinsman Murrough na dTuadh Ó Flaithbheartaigh was appointed by Queen Elizabeth as Chief of the Name instead of him. In 1565, Dónal was killed in an ambush while hunting in the hills surrounding Lough Corrib. His assassination was, undoubtedly, part of Dónal's wider struggle against Clan Joyce for control of Hen's Castle upon the lough. When the Joyces moved to take the Castle, thinking that Gráinne would not resist, she fought back successfully and forced Clan Joyce to retreat. O'Malley then returned to her own lands and established her principal residence upon Clare Island (now called Granuaile's Castle). She allegedly took a shipwrecked sailor as her lover. The affair lasted only briefly as he was killed by Clan MacMahon of Ballyvoy. Seeking vengeance, O'Malley attacked Clan MacMahon's stronghold of Doona Castle in Blacksod Bay and slew her lover's murderers upon Caher Island. Her veangence against Clan MacMahon earned Gráinne the nickname the 'Dark Lady of Doona'.

== Marriage to Bourke ==
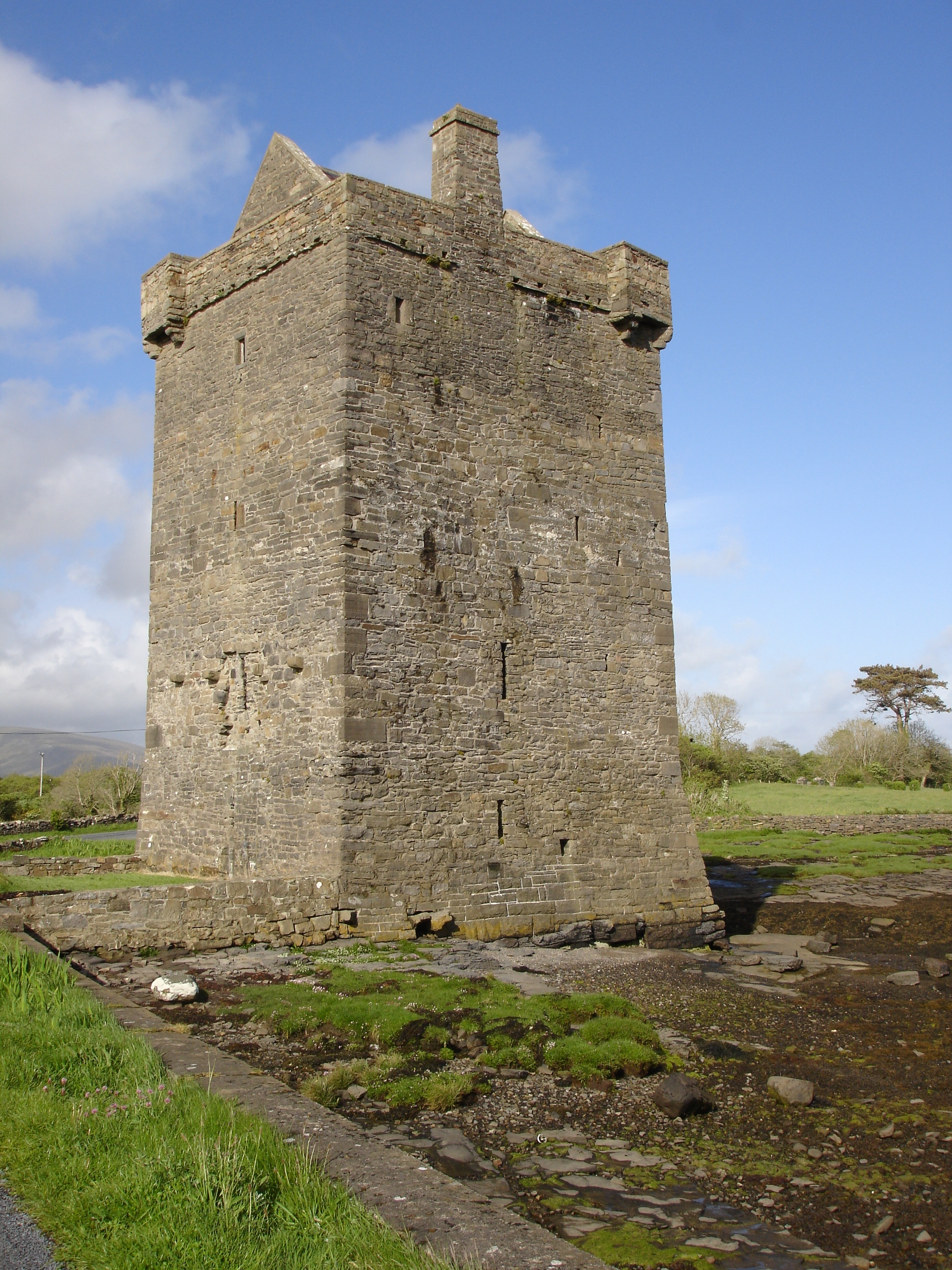
Rockfleet Castle

By 1566, O'Malley had married a second time, this time to Risdeárd an Iarainn ("Iron Richard") Bourke, 18th Mac William Íochtar (d.1583), his nickname deriving from his ironworks at Burrishoole, the place of his principal castle and residence. Tibbot, 1st Viscount Mayo, was a child of this marriage.

Still not satisfied with her revenge, O'Malley then sailed for Ballycroy and attacked the garrison at Doona Castle, overpowering the defenders and taking the castle for herself. Her attack against the MacMahons was not the first time she interrupted someone at their prayers. Legend tells of another lord who stole property from her and fled to a church for sanctuary. She was determined to wait out the thief, maintaining that he could starve or surrender. The thief dug a tunnel and escaped, however, and the hermit who took care of the church broke his vow of silence to scold her for attempting to harm someone who had sought sanctuary. Her reply is not recorded.

More than twenty years after her death, an English Lord Deputy of Ireland recalled her ability as a leader of fighting men, noting the fame she still had among the Irish people.

== Autonomous status ==
In 1576, O'Malley engaged in the surrender and regrant process with the Lord Deputy Sir Henry Sidney in respect of her lands. Because Rockfleet was over a week's march from Dublin, and as she was so often at sea, control by the Crown was very weak.

In 1593, in his letter to protest O'Malley's claims against him, Sir Richard Bingham claimed that she was "nurse to all rebellions in the province for this forty years". Bingham was Lord President of Connacht, tasked with controlling local lords who had, until then, been mostly autonomous.

O'Malley had every reason, and used every opportunity, to limit the power of the Kingdom of Ireland over her part of the country. An expedition from Galway led by Sheriff William Óge Martyn attacked her castle at Clare Island in March 1579. However, they were put to flight and barely escaped.

== Meeting with Elizabeth ==
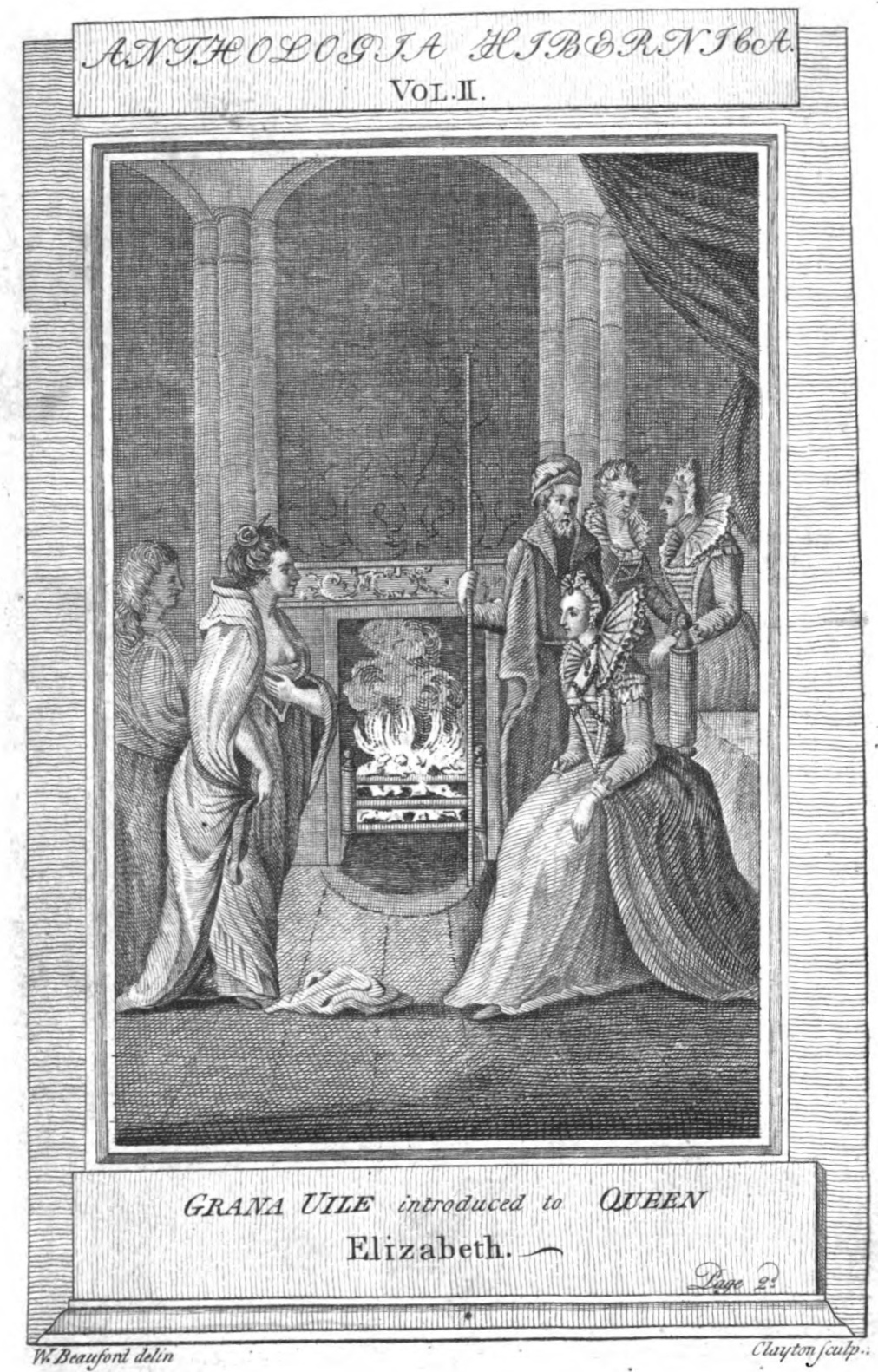
1793 illustration of O'Malley meeting Elizabeth I

In the late 16th century, English power steadily grew in Ireland and O'Malley's power was steadily encroached upon. In June 1593, O'Malley sent a petition to the Queen. She asked her "to grant her some reasonable maintenance for the little tyme she hath to live". In return she offered "a surrender at her hands" of the lands of her two sons and those of her two surviving Bourke nephews. She asked for "free libertye during her lyve to envade with sword and fire all your highness enemyes wheresoever they are or shall be ... without any interruption of any person or persons whatsoever". In May 1593, Hugh Maguire (Lord of Fermanagh) rebelled and burned Ballymote, then under the control of Sir George Bingham. One of Maguire's men was captured and implicated Grace's son Tibbott-ne-Long in a wider Tyrone- inspired conspiracy against the English. Tibbott was promptly captured by Sir Richard Bingham, sent to Athlone prison and charged with treason. Grace's half-brother Dónal na Píopa was also arrested by Sir Richard Bingham and charged with the murder of some English soldiers. Grace sailed to England to petition Queen Elizabeth I for their release. She was accompanied by Sir-Murrough-ne-Doe O'Flaherty. Sir Richard Bingham implied that Grace sailed her own ship to England as he stated she brought over the son of Ulick Bourke of Erris and her grandnephew, the son of Tibbott Reagh Bourke who "attended uppon Grany O'Maille in her late beyinge at court". The Earl of Ormond, cousin and favourite of the Queen, gave Grace an introduction to Lord Burghley, chief advisor to the Queen. Burghley sent O'Malley a list of questions, "eighteen articles of interrogatory" which were answered and returned.

At around the same time, Sir Richard Bingham wrote to Burghley: "There be 2 notable traitors gon over Sir Morrow ne doe and Grainy O’Maly both rebelle from their childhoode and continually in accion ... for notwithstanding that they have many pardons there ys matter ynough of late found out against them to hang them by justice".

Tradition but not the written sources states that O'Malley met with the Queen at Greenwich Palace, wearing a fine gown; the two of them were surrounded by guards and the members of Elizabeth's royal court.

Many of what Anne Chambers refers to as "fanciful tales" have embellished the story of the meeting in Irish story-telling tradition. For example, O'Malley is said to have refused to bow before Elizabeth because she did not recognise her as the "Queen of Ireland". It was said that she had a dagger concealed about her person, which guards found upon searching her. Elizabeth's courtiers were said to be very upset and worried, but O'Malley informed the Queen that she carried it for her own safety. Elizabeth accepted this and seemed untroubled. It was said that O'Malley had sneezed and was given a lace-edged handkerchief from a noblewoman. She apparently blew her nose into it and then threw the cloth into a nearby fireplace, much to the shock of the court. O'Malley informed everyone that in Ireland, a used handkerchief was considered dirty and was properly destroyed.

The Queen ordered her Privy Council to seek an explanation from Sir Richard Bingham regarding his treatment of O'Malley and her family and to investigate how her situation could best be relieved. Bingham defended himself replying "in defence of my own innocency ... to shew me instance of any one that ever I used violence against, havinge always (I thancke the Lord) had that consideracion of christian duty as I never sought any man's bloode otherwise then by course of her Maties. comon lawes to take away." He made his thoughts clear that "how great soevr any may make her wch knoweth her not I will nevr aske but a boat of xxx tonnes to beate her ... and wth gods assistance dryve her and all her fleet into the sea."

Towards the end of September 1593 the Queen wrote to Bingham ordering the release of Tibbott-ne-Long and Dónal-ne-Píopa from prison. She also ordered for provision to be made for Grace out of her sons' estates, the amount to be deducted from their crown taxes. She requested Bingham to allow them ownership of their lands and property and "protect them to live in peace to enjoy their livelihoods". The Queen stated that O'Malley had "departeth with great thankfulness and with many more earnest promises that she will, as long as she lives, continue a dutiful subject, yea and will employ all her power to offend and prosecute any offender against Us".

The leading authority on the life of Grace O'Malley, Anne Chambers, states that the conversation between the two women would have been in English as all the indications are that O'Malley could speak it, and not in Latin as often said.

== Last years ==
Sir Richard Bingham disagreed with the decision of the Queen and initially did not obey her instructions, which O'Malley had personally delivered to him on her return to Ireland.

O'Malley had to threaten him "that she would else repaire againe into England" if he did not comply. Therefore, he reluctantly agreed, "to enlarge Grany O'Mally, her son Tibbott and her brother Donal na Pippe, ... upon such slender surytes."

Grace O'Malley rebuilt her fleet with three large galleys and began to return to her former life. Bingham struck, quartering a troop of his soldiers on her ships to accompany her in her voyages and later forcing her into service against some of her own kinsmen who he claimed were in rebellion. Bingham quartered another detachment of his soldiers on Grace O'Malley's property in Burishoole, leading to her impoverishment. Unable to bear the strain, she, her sons cousins and followers "were forced to withdrawe themselves into the Province of Mounster, where they do remaine in great distresse". In April 1595 O'Malley sought the aid of the Earl of Ormond at his Elizabethan manor at Carrick-on-Suir. Ormond wrote to Burghley on her behalf. At some time between 17 April and 5 May she returned to England to plead her case with Burghley. O'Malley was rewarded when in August 1595, a commission was granted by the queen and the Privy Council to investigate the lands in Mayo claimed by her two sons, her grandson Dónal O'Flaherty, son of Owen, Dermot and Dónal O'Malley of "Owel O'Maillie", and Miles MacEvilly, Tibbott-ne-Long's foster-father, "with the intention of the Queen accepting their surrenders of the premises and re-granting them by letters patent."

As the Nine Years' War escalated, O'Malley sought to retrench her position with the crown. On 18 April 1595 she petitioned Lord Burghley, complaining of the activities of troops and asking to hold her estate for Elizabeth I. She added that "her sons, cousins, and followers will serve with a hundred men at their own charges at sea upon the coast of Ireland in Her Majesty's wars upon all occasions ... to continue dutiful unto Her Majesty, as true and faithful subjects". Throughout the war she encouraged and supported her son Tibbot Bourke to fight for the Crown against Tyrone's confederation of Irish lords.

In September 1595, there was a conspiracy against Sir Richard Bingham; he fled to England and was imprisoned. Sir Conyers Clifford was appointed Governor of Connaught.

She most likely died at Rockfleet Castle around 1603, the same year as Elizabeth's death, though the year and place of O'Malley's death are disputed. Her family's usual burial place was in Clare Island Abbey.

== Biographical sources ==
In her 2006 biography of O'Malley, Irish historian and novelist Anne Chambers described her as:

a fearless leader, by land and by sea, a political pragmatist and politician, a ruthless plunderer, a mercenary, a rebel, a shrewd and able negotiator, the protective matriarch of her family and tribe, a genuine inheritor of the Mother Goddess and Warrior Queen attributes of her remote ancestors. Above all else, she emerges as a woman who broke the mould and thereby played a unique role in history.

Documentary evidence for O'Malley's life comes mostly from English sources, as she is not mentioned in the Irish annals. The Ó Máille family "book", a collection of eulogistic bardic poetry and other material of the sort kept by aristocratic Gaelic households of the period, has not survived. There are no contemporary images of her. An important source of information is the eighteen "Articles of Interrogatory", questions put to her in writing on behalf of Elizabeth I. She is also mentioned in the English State Papers and in other documents of the kind, an example being a letter sent by the Lord Deputy, Sir Henry Sidney, to his son Philip in 1577: "There came to mee a most famous femynyne sea captain called Grace Imallye, and offred her service unto me, wheresoever I woulde command her, with three gallyes and two hundred fightinge men ..."

Local traditions concerning her were collected by Irish scholar John O'Donovan in the 1830s and 1840s on behalf of the Ordnance Survey of Ireland. In a letter of 1838, he describes her as being "most vividly remembered by tradition and people were living in the last generation who conversed with people who knew her personally".

Charles Cormick of Erris, now 74 years and six weeks old, saw and conversed with Elizabeth O'Donnell of Newtown within the Mullet, who died about 65 years ago who had seen and intimately known a Mr Walsh who remembered O'Malley. Walsh died at the age of 107 and his father was the same age as O'Malley.

A story is recorded of O'Malley chiding her son Tíoboíd in the course of an attack on Kanturk Castle, when she thought he was shirking the battle: "An ag iarraidh dul i bhfolach ar mo thóin atá tú, an áit a dtáinig tú as?" ("Are you trying to hide in my arse, the place that you came out of?"). She is also recorded as saying, with regard to her followers, "go mb'fhearr léi lán loinge de chlann Chonraoi agus de chlann Mhic an Fhailí ná lán loinge d'ór" (that she would rather have a shipload of Conroys and MacAnallys than a shipload of gold).

== Westport House ==
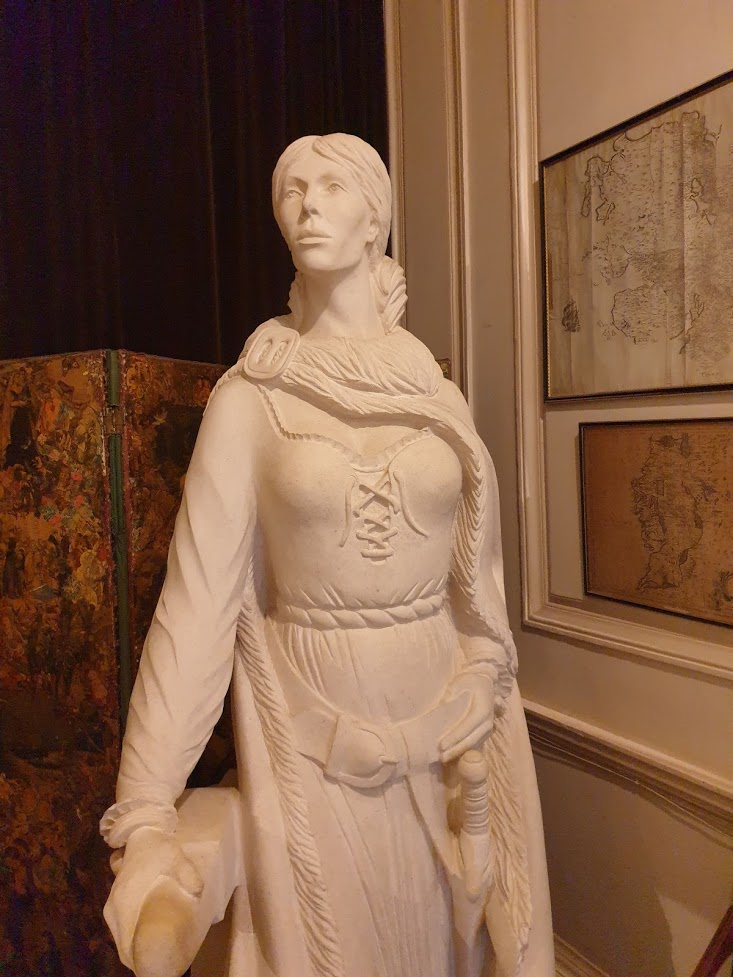
Statue of Gráinne Mhaol in Westport House

Westport House in County Mayo, Ireland, was the seat of the Browne dynasty, Marquesses of Sligo, direct descendants of Grace O'Malley. The current house was built close to the site of Cahernamart (Cathair na Mart – "fort of the beef market"), an Ó Máille fort. The original house was built by Colonel John Browne, a Jacobite, who was at the Siege of Limerick (1691), and his wife Maude Bourke. Maude Bourke was O'Malley's great-great-granddaughter.

A statue of Grace O'Malley by the artist Michael Cooper – the brother-in-law of the 11th Marquess of Sligo – is on display in Westport House, and a bronze casting of the statue is situated on the grounds near the house. Westport House also contains an exhibition on the life of O'Malley compiled by the author Anne Chambers, who wrote a biography of Granuaile.

== Cultural impact ==
O'Malley's life has inspired many musicians, novelists, and playwrights to create works based on her life and adventures and she has been used as a personification of Ireland:

=== Music ===
- The Irish language poet and Easter Rising leader Patrick Pearse used Gráinne O'Malley as a symbol of Irish republicanism in his lyrics to Óró sé do bheatha abhaile.
- In 1985, the Irish composer and singer Shaun Davey composed a suite of music based on the life and times of O'Malley, Granuaile, published in 1986.
- The Indulgers' 2000 album In Like Flynn includes a song entitled "Granuaile", which is centred on the legend of O'Malley.
- Dead Can Dance's 2012 album Anastasis features a song titled "Return of the She-King", which was inspired by O'Malley.
- The Irish musician Gavin Dunne (Miracle of Sound) released a song entitled "Gráinne Mhaol, Queen of Pirates" on his 2015 album Metal Up.
- The Canadian folk punk band The Dreadnoughts released a song entitled "Grace O'Malley" on their 2009 Victory Square album.
- The Swedish melodic death metal band Frantic Amber released a song entitled "Graínne Mhaol" on their 2017 digital re-release of the originally 2015 released album "Burning Insight".
- The 2019 album Talk Like a Pirate by Rockin' Ron the Friendly Pirate "Ron Carter" features the song "Pirate Grace O'Malley", based on the life of Grace O'Malley
- The 2022 song "Rule 23 – Birds of a Feather" by Fish in a Birdcage was inspired by Grace O'Malley
- The celtic metal band Cruachan wrote a song about her, titled "The Queen", which is featured in their 2023 album, "The Living and the Dead".

=== Theatre ===
- The play Short-Haired Grace by Bill Breuhl depicting the meeting between O'Malley and Queen Elizabeth debuted at the Merrimack Repertory Theatre Lowell, Massachusetts, 2002
- The play Bald Grace by Marki Shalloe debuted at Chicago's Stockyards Theatre in 2005, and was featured at Atlanta's Theatre Gael (America's oldest Irish-American theatre) in 2006.
- The Broadway musical The Pirate Queen depicting O'Malley's life debuted at the Hilton Theater in 2007, with Stephanie J. Block portraying O'Malley.
- American actress Molly Lyons wrote and starred in a one-woman show titled A Most Notorious Woman, detailing the life of O'Malley. It has been produced internationally at theatres and festivals.
- The 2015 play Gráinne, by J. Costello, K. Doyle, L. Errity, and A. L. Mentxaka, tells the story of Grace O'Malley in six snapshots. It was premiered by Born to Burn productions in Dublin in November 2015, with an all-woman cast playing three female roles and six male roles. The text of the play was published in a limited edition by artisan publishers Gur Cake Editions.
- Irish actress, writer and director Maggie Cronin's first play, a solo show called A Most Notorious Woman: Tales of Grace O'Malley – premiered in 1989.

=== Literature ===
- James Joyce used the legend of Grace O'Malley ("her grace o'malice") and the Earl of Howth in chapter 1 of his 1939 novel Finnegans Wake.
- Morgan Llywelyn wrote a 1986 historical fiction titled Grania: She-King of the Irish Seas.
- Neal Stephenson and Nicole Galland make extensive reference to her via written correspondence from one of the prominent characters throughout their 2017 novel The Rise and Fall of D.O.D.O.
- Siobhán Parkinson wrote a historical fiction book in 2019 in Irish titled Gráinne – Gaiscíoch Gael (Gráinne – Hero of the Irish). Cois Life. ISBN 978-1-907494-97-0.
- John Crowley's 2022 novel Flint and Mirror includes the character Gráinne O’Malley. ISBN 9781250817525.
- Little Irish History Heroes (Gill Books, 2026) by Niamh Donnellan includes the story of Grace O'Malley suitable for young children.
- The Pirate Queen (Doubleday, 2026) by Ariel Lawhon, a historical novel inspired by Grace O'Malley.

=== Statues ===
- At Westport House – see above.
- Outside "Old St Pat's" Church, Chicago
- Medlicott Street, Newport, Mayo

=== Other ===
- Grace O'Malley Park in Howth, Co Dublin commemorates her supposed attempt in 1576 to visit the nearby Howth Castle. According to legend, Granuaile temporarily abducted a family member after being denied entry.
- Since 1948, the Commissioners of Irish Lights have sailed three vessels named Granuaile. Their current sole light tender, commissioned in 2005, is the most modern serving the coast of the island of Ireland.
- In Tampa, Florida, Grace O'Malley is the inspiration for Ye Loyal Krewe of Grace O'Malley, one of many crews that participate in the Gasparilla Pirate Festival.
- RTÉ KIDSjr produced a three season podcast titled The Adventures of a Young Pirate Queen about O'Malley in her youth.
- The TV series Archer references O'Malley in the episode Space Race: Part I when Cheryl Tunt is criticised for not understanding the term "boarding party"; Cheryl retorts "Who am I, 16th century female Irish pirate Gráinne O'Malley?"

== See also ==
- Gráinne (given name)
- Irish galley
- Castlekirk
- Inishbofin, County Galway
- Jeanne de Clisson, a Breton-French pirate and land owner died ca. 1359
