= Umhaill =

Gaelic territory

- 8th century–1576
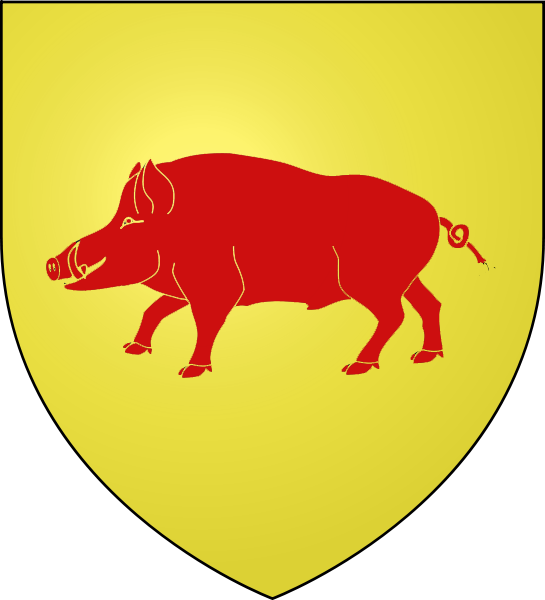
- Coat of arms

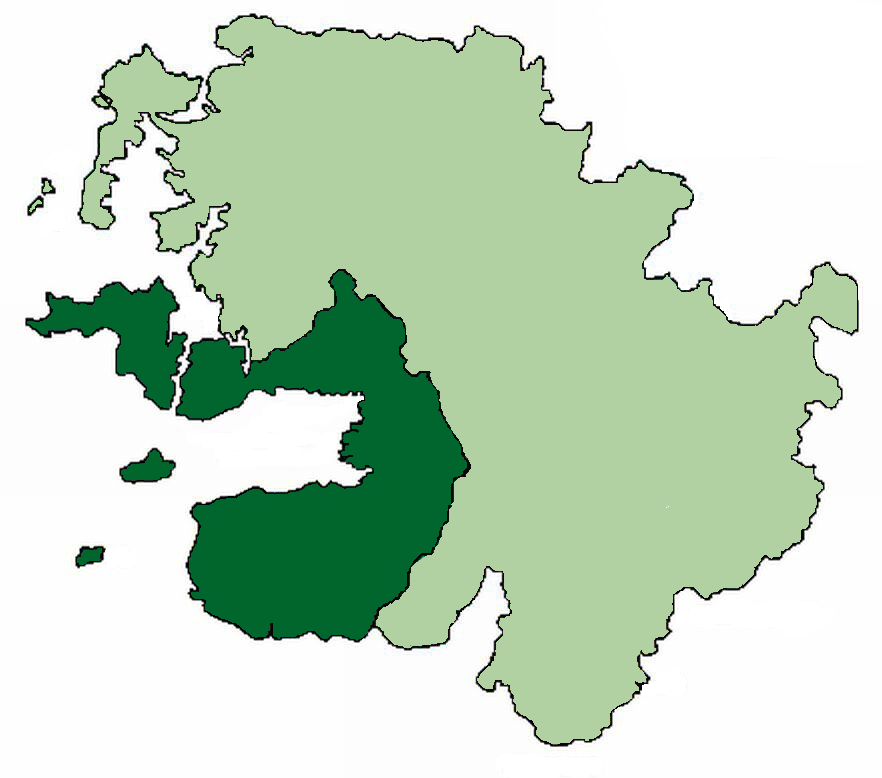
- Map of Umaill (dark green) within County Mayo.
- Status: Túatha of Connacht (until 1235)
- Common languages: Middle Irish, Early Modern Irish, Latin
- Religion: Catholic Christianity; Gaelic tradition
- Government: Tanistry
- Rí
  - -773: Flannabhra
  - 1580–1603: Grace O'Malley
- History
  - Established: 8th century
  - Disestablished: 1576
- ISO 3166 code: IE
Preceded by	Succeeded by
Partraige	Mac William Íochtar; Kingdom of Ireland
- Today part of: Ireland

Umhaill or Umhall (anglicized as Owill or Owel) was a Gaelic territory around Clew Bay in the west of what is now County Mayo, Ireland, comprising the baronies of Burrishoole (Lower Owel) and Murrisk (Upper Owel). By the 12th century, its ruling dynasty were known as the Uí Máille (O'Malleys). Originally an autonomous part of the kingdom of Connacht, it later became one of the vassal territories of the Mac William Íochtar. Umhaill's last and most famous ruler was Grace O'Malley (Gráinne Ní Mháille), nicknamed "the pirate queen". In 1576, during the Tudor conquest of Ireland, she agreed to the surrender and regrant policy, accepting English inheritance law in return for official title deeds to her lands. On her death the lands were inherited by her son Tibbot "na Long". Umhaill had a strong seafaring culture. Important sites associated with it include Carrickkildavnet Castle, Carrickahowley Castle, Granuaile's Castle and Clare Island Abbey.

== Description ==
Knox says of Murrisk "With Burrishoole it forms the kingdom of Aicill and Umall, which comes into history at the battle of Moy Lena. Aicill seems to be a descriptive term applied to mountainous country. Umall means low, and applies in this sense to the country lying east of Clew Bay, as Aicill applies to the parts lying north and south of the bay. The title may be translated as King of Highland and Lowland. Aicill survives in Achill Island and Curraun peninsula. The term was applied to the country between Clew Bay and the Killeries in the thirteenth century. Though at all times an independent kingdom acknowledging supremacy of only the King of Connacht, it was too small to play an independent part, and therefore is rarely mentioned in the annals." (p. 303).

== Legacy ==
The Gaelic culture and Irish language continued on in the area longer than most other parts of Ireland. Today, Acaill and An Corrán are part of the Mayo Gaeltacht.

== Kings of Umaill ==
Its earliest rulers were the semi-historical Tuath mhac nUmhoir. The Umaill, its early historical rulers, were renamed the Uí Briúin Umaill to claim a fictitious relationship with the Uí Briúin. By the 12th century the ruling family adopted the surname Ó Máille, and were reckoned with the Ó Dubhda, Ó Flaithbheartaigh and Mac Conraoi as supreme seafaring clans of Connacht.

== Annalistic references ==
- 812.A slaughter was made of the foreigners [i.e. Vikings] by the men of Umhall.
- 813.A battle between the men of Umhall and the foreigners, in which the men of Umhall were slaughtered, and Cosgrach, son of Flannabhrat, and Dunadhach, lord of Umhall, were slain.
- 848. Loch Laeigh, in the territory of Umhall, in Connaught, migrated.
- U913.6. Niall son of Aed led an expedition to Connacht and inflicted a battle-rout on the warriors of the north of Connacht, i.e. on the Uí Amalgada and the men of Umall, and they left behind a very large number either dead or captured, including Mael Cluiche son of Conchobor.
- M1002.10 - Conchobhar, son of Maelseachlainn, lord of Corca-Modhruadh; and Aicher Ua Traighthech, with many others, were slain by the men of Umhall.
- M1219.6. Duvdara, the son of Murray O'Malley, was put to death for his crimes by Cathal Crovderg O'Conor, while in fetters in O'Conor's fortress.
- 1415. A great prey was taken by O'Malley, i.e. Hugh, from Dermot O'Malley. Dermot in retaliation took O'Malley's Island, upon which Hugh went in pursuit of Dermot; and a battle was fought between them, in which Hugh O'Malley, Lord of Umallia, was slain by Dermot and his son Conor, and also the son of Thomas O'Malley, and Donnell, the son of Dermot O'Malley. The chieftainship of Umallia was thenceforth wrested from the descendants of Hugh; and Dermot assumed the lordship.
- 1417. Rory, the son of Murrough O'Flaherty; Rory, the son of Dermot Duv O'Flaherty, and sixteen others of the O'Flahertys, were drowned in the bay of Umallia.

== See also ==
- Iar Connacht
