= Rich Bradley =

American politician

Richard T. Bradley

Member of the Illinois House of Representatives from the 40th district 20th District (1997-2003)
- In office April 1997 – January 2009
- Preceded by: Joseph Kotlarz
- Succeeded by: Deb Mell

Personal details
- Born: May 18, 1955 (age 71) Chicago, Illinois
- Party: Democratic
- Spouse: Cynthia Santos
- Children: Three
- Education: Concordia University
- Profession: Municipal Employee

Richard T. Bradley is an American politician and a former Democratic member of the Illinois House of Representatives from 1997 to 2009.

== Political career ==
Bradley was appointed to the Illinois House of Representatives in April 1997 to represent the 20th district after the resignation of Joseph Kotlarz. He was re-elected in 1998, 2000, 2002, 2004 and 2006.

In 2008, Deb Mell, daughter of Ald. Richard Mell and sister-in-law of Illinois Governor Rod Blagojevich, announced that she was running for the 40th District seat. Bradley subsequently decided to run for the Illinois Senate against state Sen. Iris Martinez rather than face Mell. Martinez was re-elected in February 2008, defeating Bradley and another candidate.

In August 2008, Blagojevich claimed that House Democrats who held city of Chicago jobs were fearful of voting in favor of his 2008 capital bill because they thought House Speaker Michael Madigan might be able to get them fired. Blagojevich told reporters: "They fear their leader, Mr. Madigan, and if Mike Madigan tells them to vote a certain way, they will tell you privately, and I've had these discussions with a couple of state reps, one of whom said, 'I'm afraid if I vote for the jobs bill I'll be fired from my job at Streets and Sanitations [sic]. I'm afraid I'll lose my job.'" The one state legislator who worked at the Streets and Sanitation Department in Chicago was Bradley, who told the Chicago Sun-Times that he hadn't talked to Blagojevich in about two years.

== Political positions ==
Bradley said that he opposed Blagojevich's 2008 capital bill because the House Latino Caucus disagreed with its provisions as written.
