= Harold Washington =

Illinois politician and 51st mayor of Chicago

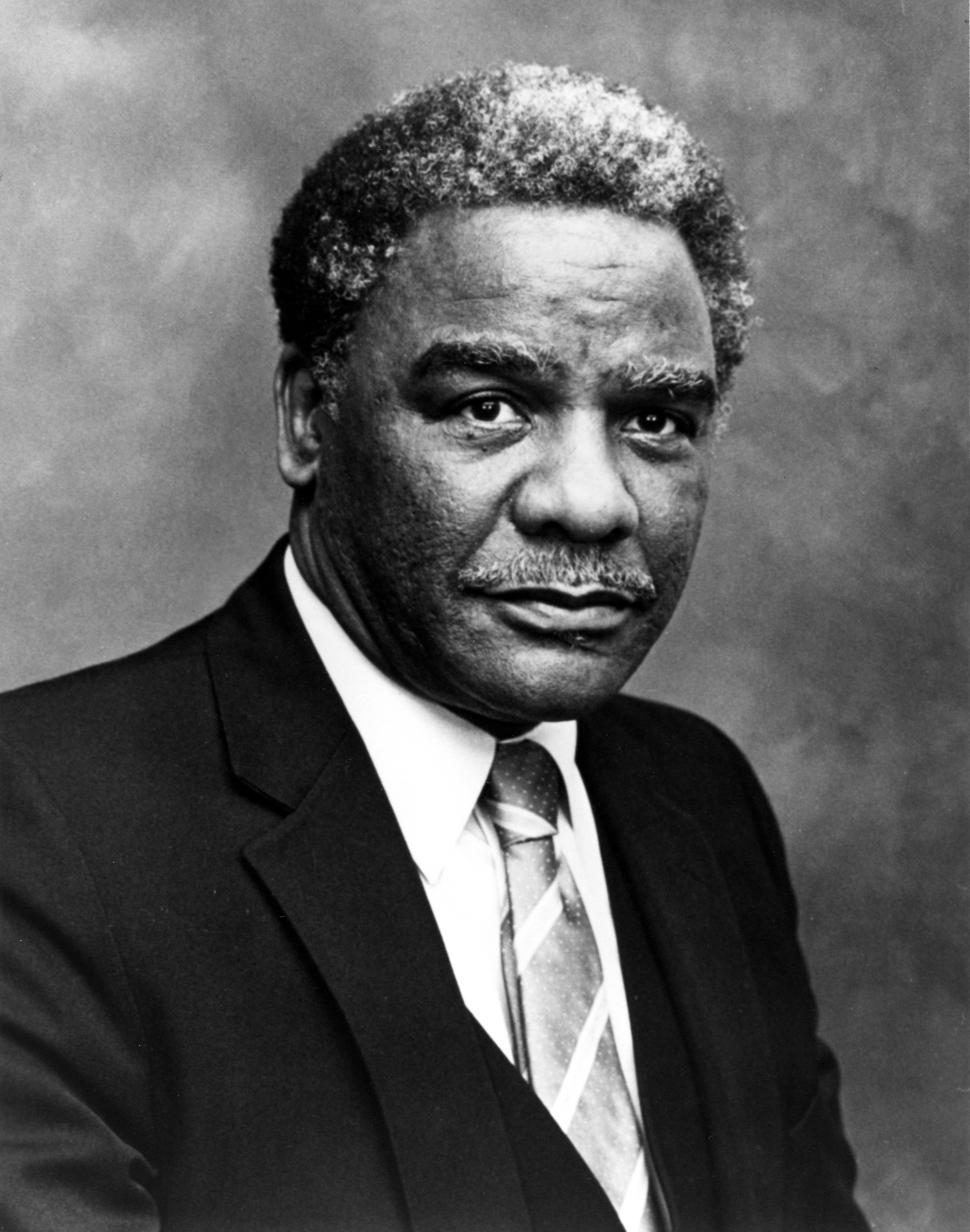
- Washington, circa 1982

51st Mayor of Chicago
- In office April 29, 1983 – November 25, 1987
- Deputy: Richard Mell; David Orr
- Preceded by: Jane Byrne
- Succeeded by: Eugene Sawyer; David Orr (acting)

Member of the U.S. House of Representatives from Illinois's 1st district
- In office January 3, 1981 – April 30, 1983
- Preceded by: Bennett Stewart
- Succeeded by: Charles Hayes

Member of the Illinois Senate from the 26th district
- In office January 12, 1977 – January 3, 1981
- Preceded by: Cecil A. Partee
- Succeeded by: James C. Taylor

Member of the Illinois House of Representatives
- In office January 13, 1965 – January 12, 1977
- Preceded by: redistricting
- Succeeded by: Peggy Smith Martin
- Constituency: At-large (1965-67); 26th district (1967-77)

Personal details
- Born: Harold Lee Washington; April 15, 1922 Chicago, Illinois, U.S.
- Died: November 25, 1987 (aged 65) Chicago, Illinois, U.S.
- Party: Democratic
- Spouse: Dorothy Finch (m. 1942; div. 1950)
- Domestic partner: Mary Ella Smith (1967–1987)
- Education: Roosevelt University (BA); Northwestern University (JD)

Military service
- Allegiance: United States
- Branch/service: United States Army
- Years of service: 1942–1945
- Rank: First Sergeant
- Unit: United States Army Air Corps; United States Army Air Forces
- Battles/wars: World War II; South Pacific; Central Pacific

Harold Lee Washington (April 15, 1922 – November 25, 1987) was an American politician and lawyer who was the 51st mayor of Chicago from 1983 until his death in 1987. A member of the Democratic Party, he was the first Black person to hold the office.

Entering politics as a critic of Chicago mayor Richard J. Daley, Washington served in both houses of the Illinois General Assembly. He was subsequently elected to the United States House of Representatives in 1980 and was reelected in 1982. He ran for Mayor of Chicago in the 1983 election. During the Democratic primary, he defeated incumbent mayor Jane Byrne and State's Attorney Richard M. Daley, son of the late mayor. Many members of the city's ethnic white Democratic political machine backed his Republican opponent, Bernard Epton, in the general election. However, Washington prevailed, winning the close race.

Washington's first term as mayor was dominated by a racially polarized political conflict dubbed the Council Wars. A 29-alderman majority on the Chicago City Council, led by Edward Vrdolyak and Edward Burke, battled Washington and effectively blocked his agenda. Running for reelection in 1987, he won the Democratic primary against former mayor Jane Byrne. He went on to defeat Vrdolyak in the general election, expanding upon his 1983 margins. Starting his second term with a supportive majority on the city council, the Council Wars largely subsided. However, Washington died in office a few months later.

Considered one of the most prominent Black elected officials of the 1980s, Washington's progressive agenda and multi-racial political coalition inspired many, including future President Barack Obama. Multiple Chicago landmarks are named in honor of Washington, including the Chicago Public Library's main branch and one of the city's community colleges.

== Biography ==
=== Ancestry ===
The earliest known ancestor of Harold Lee Washington, Isam/Isham Washington, was born a slave in 1832 in North Carolina. In 1864, he enlisted in the 8th United States Colored Heavy Artillery, Company L, in Paducah, Kentucky. Following his discharge in 1866, he began farming with his wife, Rebecca Neal, in Ballard County, Kentucky. Among their six children was Isam/Isom McDaniel (Mack) Washington, who was born in 1875. In 1896, Mack Washington married Arbella Weeks of Massac County, who had been born in Mississippi in 1878. In 1897, their first son, Roy L. Washington, father of Harold Washington, was born in Ballard County, Kentucky. In 1903, shortly after both families moved to Massac County, Illinois, the elder Washington died. After farming for a time, Mack Washington became a minister in the African Methodist Episcopal (A.M.E.) Church, serving numerous churches in Illinois until the death of his wife in 1952. Reverend I.M.D. Washington died in 1953.

=== Early life and education ===
Harold Lee Washington was born on April 15, 1922, at Cook County Hospital in Chicago, to Roy and Bertha Washington. While still in high school in Lawrenceville, Illinois, Roy met Bertha from nearby Carrier Mills and the two married in 1916 in Harrisburg, Illinois. At a time when most African Americans and Chicago residents supported the Republican Party, Roy Washington was one of the first black precinct captains for the Chicago Democratic Party; he also worked as a lawyer and Methodist minister.

Bertha left the family, possibly to seek her fortune as a singer, when Harold was four. Harold Washington grew up in Douglas, Chicago a neighborhood on the city's South Side that was the center of black culture for the entire Midwest in the early and middle 20th century. Edward and Harold stayed with their father, while Roy Jr. and Geneva were cared for by their grandparents. After attending St. Benedict the Moor Boarding School in Milwaukee from 1928 to 1932, Washington attended DuSable High School, a new racially segregated public school, from 1936 to 1939. In a citywide track meet in 1939, Washington claimed first place in the 110-meter high hurdles and second place in the 220-meter low hurdles, playing a key role in the school's victory in the Chicago Public League Championship that year.

Washington left high school during his senior year and joined the Civilian Conservation Corps in 1939. He later worked at a meatpacking plant before his father helped him get a job at the U.S. Treasury branch in the city. There he met Nancy Dorothy Finch, whom he married soon after; Washington was 19 and Dorothy was 17.

=== Military service ===
In 1942, Washington was drafted into the United States Army for the war effort and, after basic training, sent overseas as part of the 1887th Engineer Aviation Battalion, a racially segregated unit of the Air Force Engineers. Washington was part of a unit that built a bomber landing strip on Angaur island in Palau in just 29 days, an action that earned the unit a Meritorious Service Unit Award. Eventually, Washington rose to the rank of First Sergeant in the Army Air Forces; he was honorably discharged in 1946 and was awarded his high school diploma from DuSable.

=== Roosevelt College ===
In the summer of 1946, Washington, aged 24 and a war veteran, enrolled at Roosevelt College (now Roosevelt University). Washington joined other groups of students not permitted to enroll in other local colleges. Local estimates place the student population of Roosevelt College at about 1/8 black and 1/2 Jewish. A full 75% of the students had enrolled because of the "nondiscriminatory progressive principles". Washington chaired a student fundraising drive, and then was named to a committee that supported citywide efforts to outlaw "restrictive covenants" in housing, the legal means by which members of ethnic minority groups (especially blacks and, to a lesser extent, Jews) were prohibited from purchasing real estate in predominantly white neighborhoods of the city.

In 1946, Washington was elected the third president of Roosevelt's student council; he was also the first black student to win that office. Washington saw Henry A. Wallace as an influence. Under his leadership, the student council successfully petitioned the college to have student representation on Roosevelt's faculty committees. At the first regional meeting of the newly founded National Student Association in the spring of 1948, Washington and nine other delegates proposed student representation on college faculties, and a "Bill of Rights" for students; both measures were roundly defeated. The next year, Washington went to the state capital at Springfield to protest Illinois legislators' coming probe of "subversives". The probe would outlaw the Communist Party and require "loyalty oaths" for teachers. Washington led students' opposition to the bills, which would pass later in 1949.

During his college years, Washington came to be known for his stability. His friends said that he had a "remarkable ability to keep cool", reason carefully and walk a middle line. Washington intentionally avoided activities considered extremist, including street actions and sit-ins against racially segregated restaurants and businesses. Overall, Washington and other radical activists ended up sharing a mutual respect for each other, acknowledging both Washington's pragmatism and the activists' idealism. With the opportunities found only at Roosevelt College in the late 1940s, Washington's time at the Roosevelt College proved to be pivotal. Washington graduated in August 1949, with a Bachelor of Arts degree. In addition to his activities at Roosevelt, he was a member of Phi Beta Sigma fraternity.

=== Northwestern University School of Law ===
In 1949, Washington began studies at the Northwestern University School of Law. where he was the only black student in his class (there were six women in the class, one of them being Dawn Clark Netsch). In 1951, his last year, he was elected treasurer of the Junior Bar Association (JBA). The election was largely symbolic, however, and Washington's attempts to give the JBA more authority at Northwestern were largely unsuccessful. On campus, Washington joined the Nu Beta Epsilon fraternity, largely because he and the other people who were members of ethnic minority groups which constituted the fraternity were blatantly excluded from the other fraternities on campus. Overall, Washington stayed away from the activism that defined his years at Roosevelt. During the evenings and weekends, he worked to supplement his GI Bill income. He received his JD in 1952.

While attending law school, Washington divorced from his wife Dorothy in 1950; they had no children and had often lived separately during their marriage.

== Early political career ==
After completing law school, Washington went into private practice with his father in 1952. His law office was near those of Ralph Metcalfe, former Olympic track athlete turned Chicago city alderman for the Third Ward. Following his father's death in 1953, Washington succeeded his father as Third Ward precinct captain in 1954 and became an assistant prosecutor with the Chicago corporation counsel office. Richard J. Daley was elected party chairman in 1952. Daley replaced C.C. Wimbush, an ally of William Dawson, on the party committee with Metcalfe. Under Metcalfe, the 3rd Ward was a critical factor in Daley's 1955 mayoral election victory and ranked first in the city in the size of its Democratic plurality in 1961. While working under Metcalfe, Washington began to organize the 3rd Ward's Young Democrats (YD) organization. At YD conventions, the 3rd Ward would push for numerous resolutions in the interest of blacks. Eventually, other black YD organizations would come to the 3rd Ward headquarters for advice on how to run their own organizations. Like he had at Roosevelt College, Washington avoided radicalism and preferred to work through the party to engender change. While working with the Young Democrats, Washington met Mary Ella Smith. They dated for the next 20 years, and in 1983 Washington proposed to Smith. In an interview with the Chicago Sun-Times, Smith said that she never pressed Washington for marriage because she knew Washington's first love was politics, saying, "He was a political animal. He thrived on it, and I knew any thoughts of marriage would have to wait. I wasn't concerned about that. I just knew the day would come."

In 1959 Al Janney, Gus Savage, Lemuel Bentley, Bennett Johnson, Luster Jackson and others founded the Chicago League of Negro Voters, one of the first African-American political organizations in the city. In its first election, Bentley drew 60,000 votes for city clerk. The endorsement of the League was the deciding factor in the re-election of Leon Despres, who was an independent voice on the City Council. Washington was a close friend of the founders of the League and worked with them from time to time. In 1963 the group re-organized as Protest at the Polls. In 1967, Protest at the Polls played a key role in electing Anna Langford, William Cousins and A. A. "Sammy" Rayner, who were not part of the Daley machine, to seats on the City Council. In 1983, Protest at the Polls was instrumental in Washington's run for mayor. By then, the YDs were losing to independent candidates.

== Legislative career ==
=== Illinois House (1965–1976) ===
After the state legislature failed to reapportion districts every ten years as required by the census, the 1964 election was held at-large to elect all 177 members of the Illinois House of Representatives. With the Republicans and Democrats each only running 118 candidates, independent voting groups attempted to slate candidates. The League of Negro Voters created a "Third Slate" of 59 candidates, announcing the creation of the slate on June 27, 1964. Shortly afterwards, Daley created a slate which included Adlai Stevenson III and Washington. The Third Slate was then thrown out by the Illinois Election Board because of "insufficient signatures" on the nominating petitions. In the election, Washington was elected as part of the winning Democratic slate of candidates. Washington's years in the Illinois House were marked by tension with Democratic Party leadership. In 1967, he was ranked by the Independent Voters of Illinois (IVI) as the fourth-most independent legislator in the Illinois House and named Best Legislator of the Year. His defiance of the "idiot card", a sheet of paper that directed legislators' votes on every issue, attracted the attention of party leaders, who moved to remove Washington from his legislative position. Daley often told Metcalfe to dump Washington as a candidate, but Metcalfe did not want to risk losing the 3rd Ward's Young Democrats, who were mostly aligned with Washington.

Washington backed Renault Robinson, a black police officer and one of the founders of the Afro-American Patrolmen's League (AAPL). The aim of the AAPL was to fight against the racism which was directed against minority officers by the rest of the predominantly white department. Soon after the creation of the group, Robinson was written up for minor infractions, suspended, reinstated, and then placed on the graveyard shift on a single block behind central police headquarters. Robinson approached Washington and asked him to fashion a bill which would authorize the creation of a civilian review board, consisting of both patrolmen and officers, to monitor police brutality. Both black independent and white liberal legislators refused to back the bill, afraid to challenge Daley's grip on the police force.

After Washington announced that he would support the AAPL, Metcalfe refused to protect him from Daley. Washington believed that he had the support of Ralph Tyler Smith, Speaker of the House. Instead, Smith criticized Washington and then allayed Daley's anger. In exchange for the party's backing, Washington would serve on the Chicago Crime Commission, the group Daley tasked with investigating the AAPL's charges. The commission promptly found the AAPL's charges "unwarranted". An angry and humiliated Washington admitted that on the commission, he felt like Daley's "showcase ni***r". In 1969, Daley removed Washington's name from the slate; only by the intervention of Cecil Partee, a party loyalist, was Washington reinstated. The Democratic Party supported Jim Taylor, a former professional boxer, Streets and Sanitation worker, over Washington. With Partee and his own ward's support, Washington defeated Taylor. His years in the House of Representatives were focused on becoming an advocate for black rights. He continued work on the Fair Housing Act, and worked to strengthen the state's Fair Employment Practices Commission (FEPC). In addition, he worked on a state Civil Rights Act, which would strengthen employment and housing provisions in the federal Civil Rights Act of 1964. In his first session, all of his bills were sent to committee or tabled. Like his time in Roosevelt College, Washington relied on parliamentary tactics (e.g., writing amendments guaranteed to fail in a vote) to enable him to bargain for more concessions.

Washington was accused of failing to file a tax return, even though the tax was paid. He was found guilty and sentenced to 36 days in jail. (1971)

Washington also passed bills in honor of civil rights figures. He passed a resolution in honor of Metcalfe, his mentor. He also passed a resolution in honor of James J. Reeb, a Unitarian minister who was beaten to death by a segregationist mob in Selma, Alabama. After the 1968 assassination of Martin Luther King Jr., he introduced a series of bills which were aimed at making King's birthday a state holiday. The first was tabled and later vetoed. The third bill he introduced, which was passed and signed by Gov. Richard Ogilvie, made Dr. King's birthday a commemorative day observed by Illinois public schools. It was not until 1973 that Washington was able, with Partee's help in the Senate, to have the bill enacted and signed by the governor.

==== 1975 speakership campaign ====
Washington ran a largely symbolic campaign for Speaker. He only received votes from himself and from Lewis A. H. Caldwell. However, with a divided Democratic caucus, this was enough to help deny Daley-backed Clyde Choate the nomination, helping to throw it to William A. Redmond after 92 rounds of voting.

Redmond had Washington appointed as chairman of the Judiciary Committee.

==== Legal issues ====
In addition to Daley's strong-arm tactics, Washington's time in the Illinois House was also marred by problems with tax returns and allegations of not performing services owed to his clients. In her biography, Levinsohn questions whether the timing of Washington's legal troubles was politically motivated. In November 1966, Washington was re-elected to the House over Daley's strong objections; the first complaint was filed in 1964; the second was filed by January 1967. A letter asking Washington to explain the matter was sent on January 5, 1967. After failing to respond to numerous summons and subpoenas, the commission recommend a five-year suspension on March 18, 1968. A formal response to the charges did not occur until July 10, 1969. In his reply, Washington said that "sometimes personal problems are enlarged out of proportion to the entire life picture at the time and the more important things are abandoned." In 1970, the Board of Managers of the Chicago Bar Association ruled that Washington's license be suspended for only one year, not the five recommended; the total amount in question between all six clients was $205.

In 1971, Washington was charged with failure to file tax returns for four years, although the Internal Revenue Service (IRS) claimed to have evidence for nineteen years. Judge Sam Perry noted that he was "disturbed that this case ever made it to my courtroom"—while Washington had paid his taxes, he ended up owing the government a total of $508 as a result of not filing his returns. Typically, the IRS handled such cases in civil court, or within its bureaucracy. Washington pleaded "no contest" and was sentenced to forty days in Cook County Jail, a $1,000 fine, and three years of probation.

=== Illinois Senate (1976–1980) ===
==== Campaign for a seat on the Illinois Senate ====
In 1975, Partee, now President of the Senate and eligible for his pension, decided to retire from the Senate. Although Daley and Taylor declined at first, at Partee's insistence, Washington was ultimately slated for the seat and he received the party's support. Daley had been displeased with Washington for having run a symbolic challenge in 1975 to Daley-backed Clyde Choate for Speaker of the Illinois House (Washington had only received two votes). Additionally, he had ultimately helped push the vote towards Redmond as a compromise candidate. The United Automobile Workers union, whose backing Washington obtained, were critical in persuading Daley to relent to back his candidacy.

Washington defeated Anna Langford by nearly 2,000 votes in the Democratic primary. He went on to win the general election.

==== Human Rights Act of 1980 ====
In the Illinois Senate, Washington's main focus was to pass 1980's Illinois Human Rights Act. Legislators rewrote all of the human rights laws in the state, restricting discrimination based on "race, color, religion, sex, national origin, ancestry, age, marital status, physical or mental disability, military status, sexual orientation, or unfavorable discharge from military service in connection with employment, real estate transactions, access to financial credit, and the availability of public accommodations." The bill's origins began in 1970 with the rewriting of the Illinois Constitution. The new constitution required all governmental agencies and departments to be reorganized for efficiency. Republican governor James R. Thompson reorganized low-profile departments before his re-election in 1978. In 1979, during the early stages of his second term and immediately in the aftermath of the largest vote for a gubernatorial candidate in the state's history, Thompson called for human rights reorganization. The bill would consolidate and remove some agencies, eliminating a number of political jobs. Some Democratic legislators would oppose any measure backed by Washington, Thompson and Republican legislators.

For many years, human rights had been a campaign issue brought up and backed by Democrats. Thompson's staffers brought the bill to Washington and other black legislators before it was presented to the legislature. Washington made adjustments in anticipation of some legislators' concerns regarding the bill, before speaking for it in April 1979. On May 24, 1979, the bill passed the Senate by a vote of 59 to 1, with two voting present and six absent. The victory in the Senate was attributed by a Thompson staffer to Washington's "calm noncombative presentation". However, the bill stalled in the House. State Representative Susan Catania insisted on attaching an amendment to allow women guarantees in the use of credit cards. This effort was assisted by Carol Moseley Braun, a representative from Hyde Park who would later go on to serve as a U.S. Senator. State Representatives Jim Taylor and Larry Bullock introduced over one hundred amendments, including the text of the first ten amendments to the U.S. Constitution, to try to stall the bill. With Catania's amendment, the bill passed the House, but the Senate refused to accept the amendment. On June 30, 1979, the legislature adjourned.

=== United States Representative (1981–1983) ===
In 1980, Washington was elected to the U.S. House of Representatives in Illinois's 1st congressional district. He defeated incumbent Representative Bennett Stewart in the Democratic primary. Anticipating that the Democratic Party would challenge him in his bid for re-nomination in 1982, Washington spent much of his first term campaigning for re-election, often travelling back to Chicago to campaign. Washington missed many House votes, an issue that would come up in his campaign for mayor in 1983. Washington's major congressional accomplishment involved legislation to extend the Voting Rights Act, legislation that opponents had argued was only necessary in an emergency. Others, including Congressman Henry Hyde, had submitted amendments designed to seriously weaken the power of the Voting Rights Act.

Although he had been called "crazy" for railing in the House of Representatives against deep cuts to social programs, Associated Press political reporter Mike Robinson noted that Washington worked "quietly and thoughtfully" as the time came to pass the act. During hearings in the South regarding the Voting Rights Act, Washington asked questions that shed light on tactics used to prevent African Americans from voting (among them, closing registration early, literacy tests, and gerrymandering). After the amendments were submitted on the floor, Washington spoke from prepared speeches that avoided rhetoric and addressed the issues. As a result, the amendments were defeated, and Congress passed the Voting Rights Act Extension. By the time Washington faced re-election in 1982, he had cemented his popularity in the 1st Congressional District. Jane Byrne could not find one serious candidate to run against Washington for his re-election campaign. He had collected 250,000 signatures to get on the ballot, although only 610 signatures (0.5% of the voters in the previous election) were required. With his re-election to Congress locked up, Washington turned his attention to the next Chicago mayoral election.

== Mayoralty (1983–1987) ==
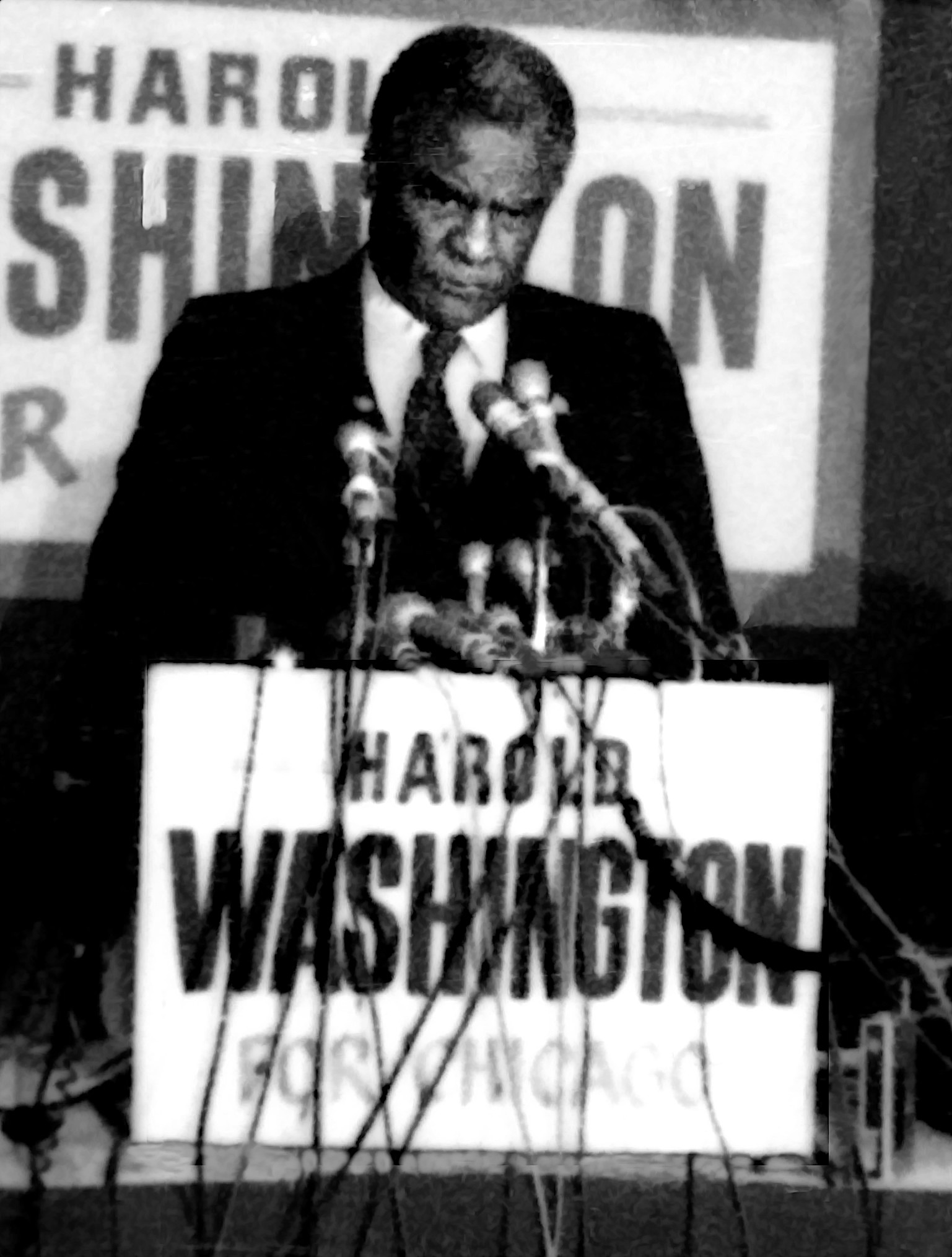
Washington holds a press conference for his 1983 campaign at the Hyatt Regency Chicago on December 13, 1982.

=== 1983 Chicago mayoral election ===
In the February 22, 1983, Democratic mayoral primary, more than 100,000 new voters registered to vote led by a coalition that included the Latino reformed gang Young Lords led by Jose Cha Cha Jimenez. On the North and Northwest Sides, the incumbent mayor Jane Byrne led and future mayor Richard M. Daley, son of the late Mayor Richard J. Daley, finished a close second. Harold Washington had massive majorities on the South and West Sides. Southwest Side voters overwhelmingly supported Daley. Washington won with 37% of the vote, versus 33% for Byrne and 30% for Daley. Although winning the Democratic primary was normally considered tantamount to election in heavily Democratic Chicago, after his primary victory Washington found that his Republican opponent, former state legislator Bernard Epton (earlier considered a nominal stand-in), was supported by many high-ranking Democrats and their ward organizations, including the chairman of the Cook County Democratic Party, Alderman Edward Vrdolyak.

Epton's campaign referred to, among other things, Washington's conviction for failure to file income tax returns (he had paid the taxes, but had not filed a return). Washington, on the other hand, stressed reforming the Chicago patronage system and the need for a jobs program in a tight economy. In the April 12, 1983, mayoral general election, Washington defeated Epton by 48,250 votes, 52% to 48%, to become mayor of Chicago. Washington was sworn in as mayor on April 29, 1983, and resigned his Congressional seat the following day.

=== First term and Council Wars ===
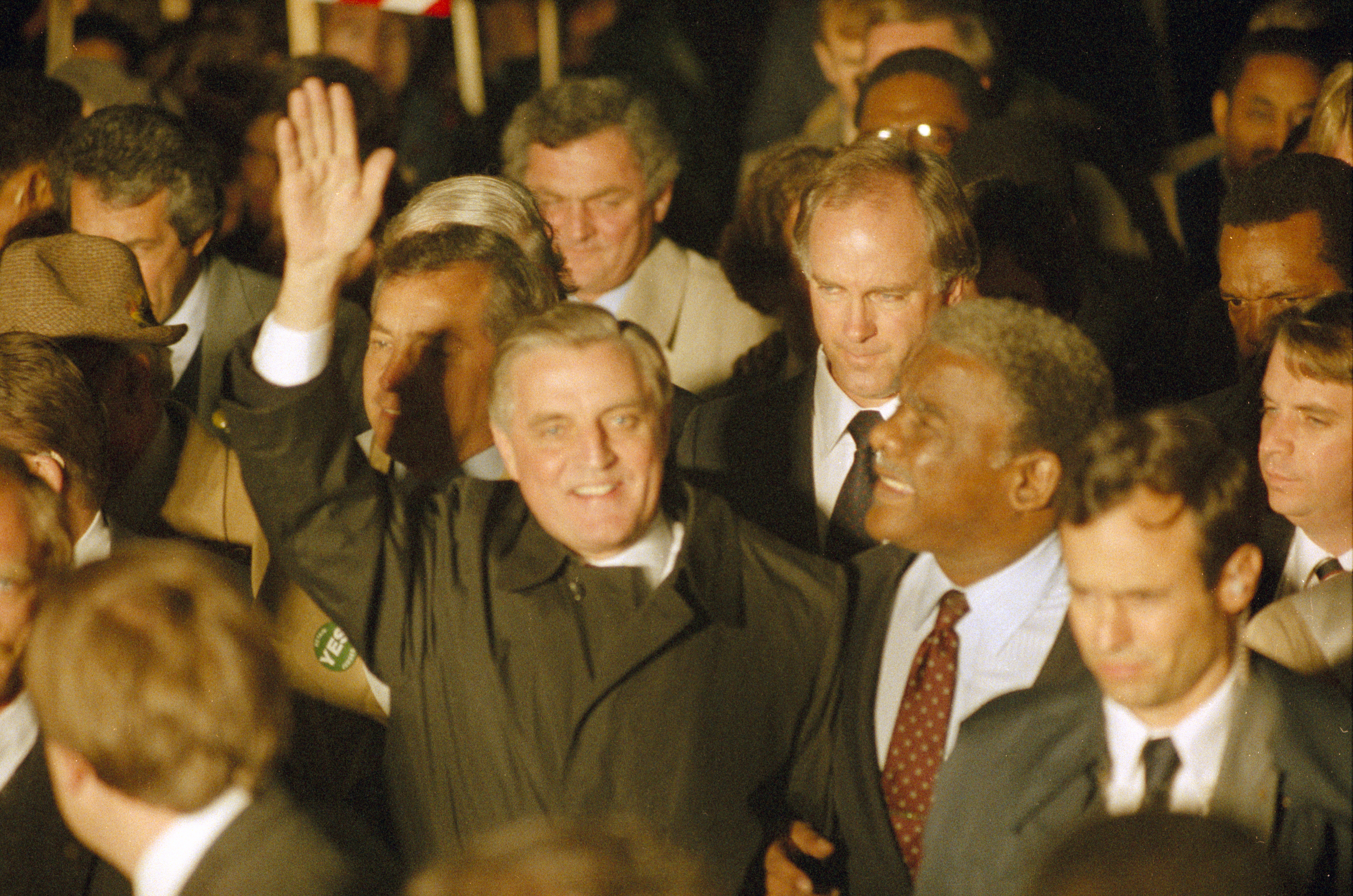
Washington marching through Chicago with Walter Mondale during Mondale's 1984 presidential campaign

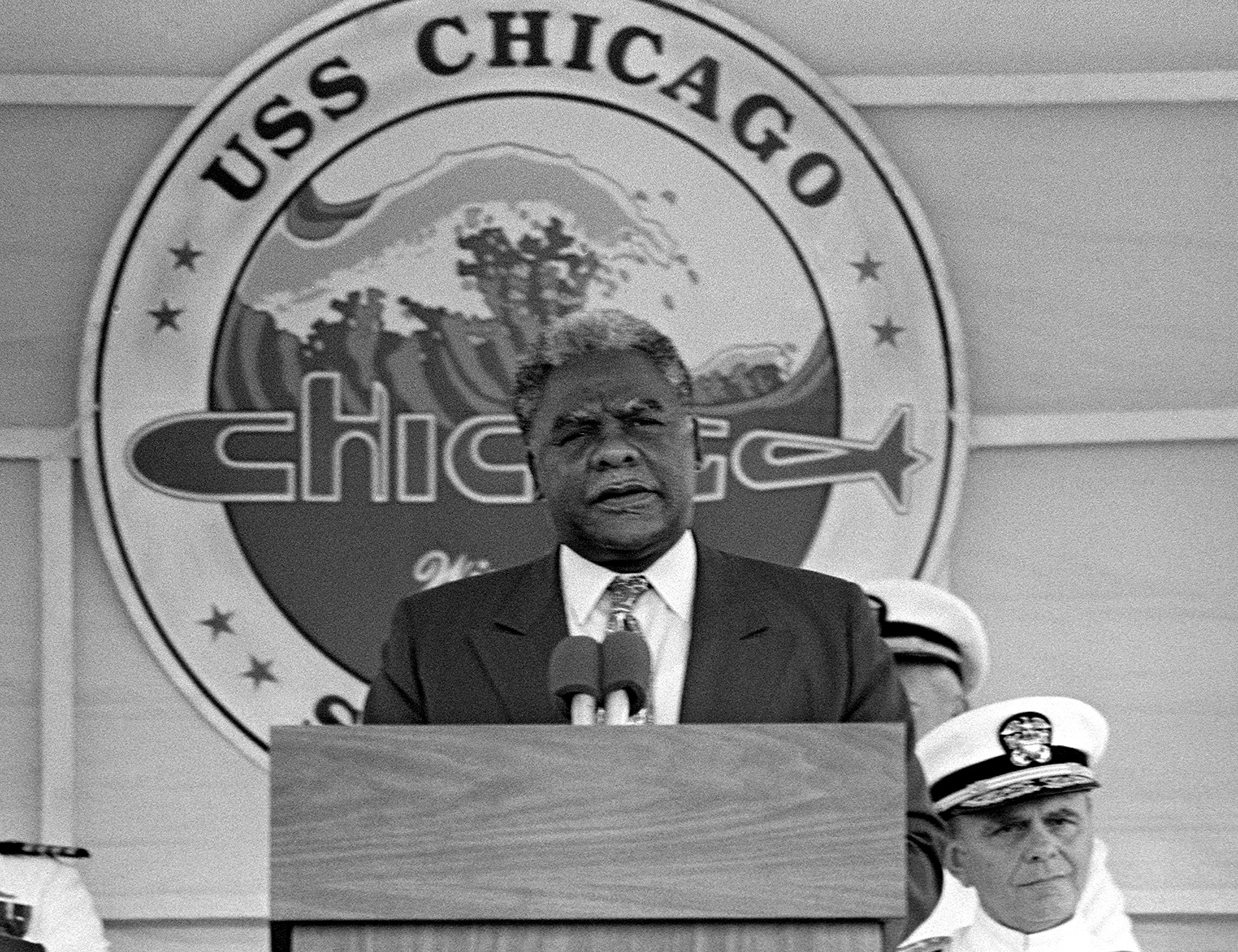
Harold Washington speaking at the commissioning of USS Chicago, September 1986.

During his tenure as mayor, Washington lived at the Hampton House apartments in the Hyde Park neighborhood of Chicago. He created the city's first environmental-affairs department under the management of longtime Great Lakes environmentalist Lee Botts. Washington's first term in office was characterized by conflict with the city council dubbed "Council Wars", referring to the then-recent Star Wars films and caused Chicago to be nicknamed "Beirut on the Lake". A 29-alderman City Council majority refused to enact Washington's legislation and prevented him from appointing nominees to boards and commissions. First-term challenges included city population loss and a massive decrease in ridership on the Chicago Transit Authority (CTA). Assertions that the overall crime rate increased were incorrect.

The 29, also known as the "Vrdolyak 29", were led by Vrdolyak (who was an Alderman in addition to Cook County Democratic Party chairman) and Finance Chair, Alderman Edward Burke. Parks superintendent Edmund Kelly also opposed the mayor. The three were known as "the Eddies" and were supported by the younger Daley (now State's Attorney), U.S. Congressmen Dan Rostenkowski and Bill Lipinski, and much of the Democratic Party. During his first city council meeting, Washington and the 21 supportive aldermen walked out of the meeting after a quorum had been established. Vrdolyak and the other 28 then chose committee chairmen and assigned aldermen to the various committees. Later lawsuits submitted by Washington and others were dismissed by Supreme Court Justice James C. Murray because it was determined that the appointments were legally made. Washington ruled by veto. The 29 lacked the 30th vote they needed to override Washington's veto; female and African American aldermen supported Washington despite pressure from the Eddies. Meanwhile, in the courts, Washington kept the pressure on to reverse the redistricting of city council wards that the city council had created during the Byrne years. During special elections in 1986, victorious Washington-backed candidates in the first round ensured at least 24 supporters in the city council. Six weeks later, when Marlene Carter and Luís Gutiérrez won run-off elections, Washington had the 25 aldermen he needed. His vote as president of the City Council enabled him to break 25–25 tie-votes and enact his programs.

=== 1987 Re-election ===
Washington defeated former mayor Jane Byrne in the February 24, 1987, Democratic mayoral primary by 79,238 votes, 54% to 46%, and in the April 7, 1987, mayoral general election defeated Vrdolyak (Illinois Solidarity Party) by 131,797 votes, 54% to 42%, with Northwestern University business professor Donald Haider (Republican) getting 4%, to win reelection to a second term as mayor. Cook County Assessor Thomas Hynes (Chicago First Party), a Daley ally, dropped out of the race 36 hours before the mayoral general election. During Washington's short second term, the Eddies lost much of their power: Vrdolyak became a Republican, Kelly was removed from his powerful parks post, and Burke lost his Finance Committee chairmanship.

=== Political Education Project (PEP) ===
From March 1984 to 1987, the Political Education Project (PEP) served as Washington's political arm, organizing both Washington's campaigns and the campaigns of his political allies. Harold Washington established the Political Education Project in 1984. This organization supported Washington's interests in electoral politics beyond the Office of the Mayor. PEP helped organize political candidates for statewide elections in 1984 and managed Washington's participation in the 1984 Democratic National Convention as a "favorite son" presidential candidate. PEP used its political connections to support candidates such as Luis Gutiérrez and Jesús "Chuy" García through field operations, voter registration and Election Day poll monitoring. Once elected, these aldermen helped break the stalemate between Washington and his opponents in the city council. Due to PEP's efforts, Washington's City Council legislation gained ground and his popularity grew as the 1987 mayoral election approached. In preparation for the 1987 mayoral election, PEP formed the Committee to Re-Elect Mayor Washington. This organization carried out fundraising for the campaign, conducted campaign events, and coordinated volunteers. PEP staff members, such as Joseph Gardner and Helen Shiller, went on to play leading roles in Chicago politics.

The organization disbanded upon Harold Washington's death. Harold Washington's Political Education Project Records is an archival collection detailing the organization's work. It is located in the Chicago Public Library Special Collections, Harold Washington Library Center, Chicago, Illinois.

=== DuSable Park ===
Washington, during his mayorship, announced a plan to redevelop a commercial site into a DuSable Park, named in honor of Jean Baptiste Point du Sable, the honorary founder of the city. The project has yet to be completed, has experienced a number of bureaucratic reconceptions and roadblocks, and is currently spearheaded by the DuSable Heritage Association.

=== Approval ratings ===
Despite tumult between Washington and the City Council, Washington enjoyed positive approval among the city's residents.

An April 1987 Chicago Tribune poll of voters indicated that there was a significant age and gender gap in Washington's approval, with Washington being more popularly approved of by voters under the age of 55 and by male voters.

View source data.

Segment polled	Polling source	Date	Approve	Disapprove	Sample size	Margin-of-error	Polling method	Citation
Registered voters	Market Shares Corp. and Chicago Tribune	March 12–15, 1987	67%		1,145	±3	Telephone	
Registered voters	Penn Schoen	October 1986	54%	39%	1,200			
Residents	Chicago Tribune	October 29–November 3, 1985	60%	30%	515			
Residents	Chicago Tribune	March 1985	35%	21%				
	Chicago Tribune	1985	54%	36%				

=== Academic assessments ===
A 1993 survey of historians, political scientists and urban experts conducted by Melvin G. Holli of the University of Illinois at Chicago ranked Washington as the nineteenth-best American big-city mayor to have served between the years 1820 and 1993. A separate 1985 survey of experts on Chicago politics by Holli saw the then-incumbent Washington ranked eleventh-best among all Chicago mayors (up to that time). A 1994 iteration of the same survey of Chicago political experts saw Washington ranked third-best among all Chicago mayors.

== Death and funeral ==
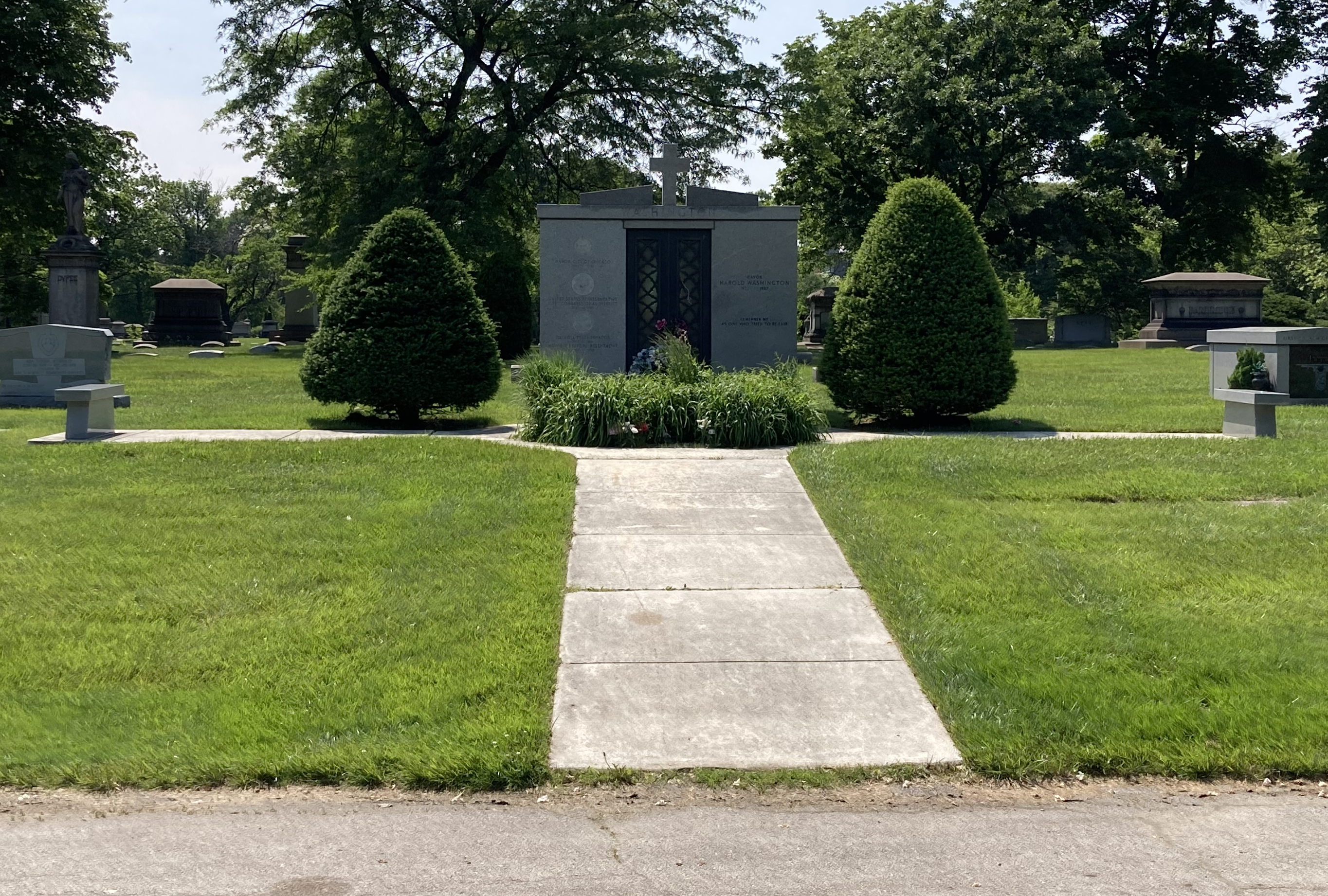
Washington mausoleum at Oak Woods Cemetery

On November 25, 1987, at 11:00 am, Chicago Fire Department paramedics were called to City Hall. Washington's press secretary, Alton Miller, had been discussing school board issues with the mayor when Washington suddenly slumped over on his desk, falling unconscious. After failing to revive Washington in his office, paramedics rushed him to Northwestern Memorial Hospital. Further attempts to revive him failed, and Washington was pronounced dead at 1:36 p.m.

At Daley Plaza, Patrick Keen, project director for the Westside Habitat for Humanity, announced Washington's official time of death to a separate gathering of Chicagoans. Initial reactions to the pronouncement of his death were of shock and sadness, as many black people believed that Washington was the only top Chicago official who would address their concerns. Following his death, President Ronald Reagan issued a statement calling Washington a "dedicated and outspoken leader who guided one of our nation's largest cities through the 1980's".

Thousands of Chicagoans attended his wake in the lobby of City Hall between November 27 and 29, 1987. On November 30, 1987, Reverend B. Herbert Martin officiated Washington's funeral service in Christ Universal Temple at 119th Street and Ashland Avenue in Chicago. After the service, Washington was buried in Oak Woods Cemetery on the South Side of Chicago.

=== Rumors ===
Immediately after Washington's death, rumors about how Washington died began to surface. On January 6, 1988, Dr. Antonio Senat, Washington's personal physician, denied "unfounded speculations" that Washington had cocaine in his system at the time of his death, or that foul play was involved. Cook County Medical Examiner Robert J. Stein performed an autopsy on Washington and concluded that Washington had died of a heart attack. Washington had weighed 284 pounds (129 kg), and suffered from hypertension, high cholesterol levels, and an enlarged heart. His diet was "heavy in fat and sodium", wrote Gary Rivlin. On June 20, 1988, Alton Miller again indicated that drug reports on Washington had come back negative, and that Washington had not been poisoned prior to his death. Dr. Stein stated that the only drug in Washington's system had been lidocaine, which is used to stabilize the heart after a heart attack takes place. The drug was given to Washington either by paramedics or by doctors at Northwestern Memorial Hospital.

== Legacy ==
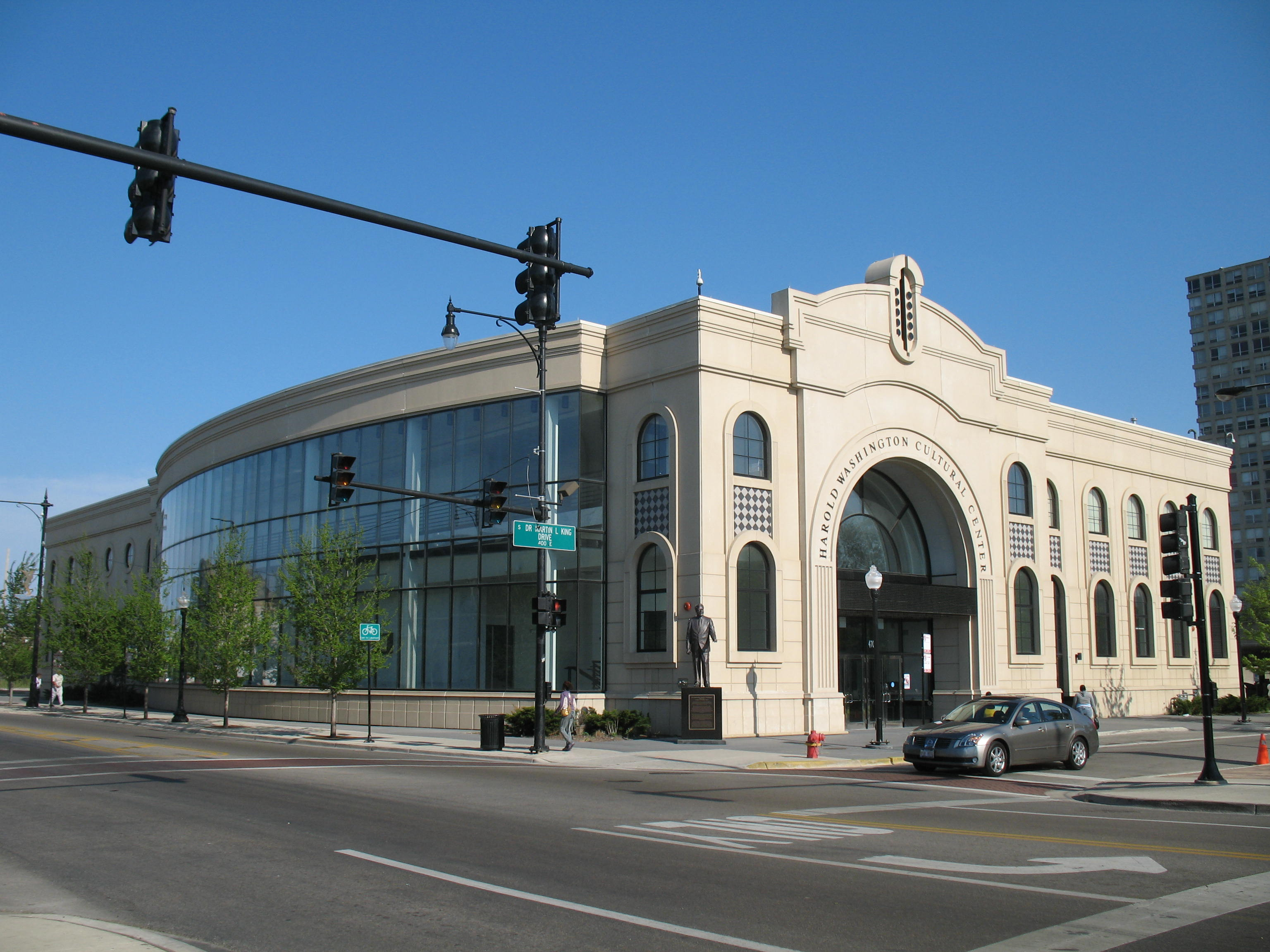
Harold Washington Cultural Center

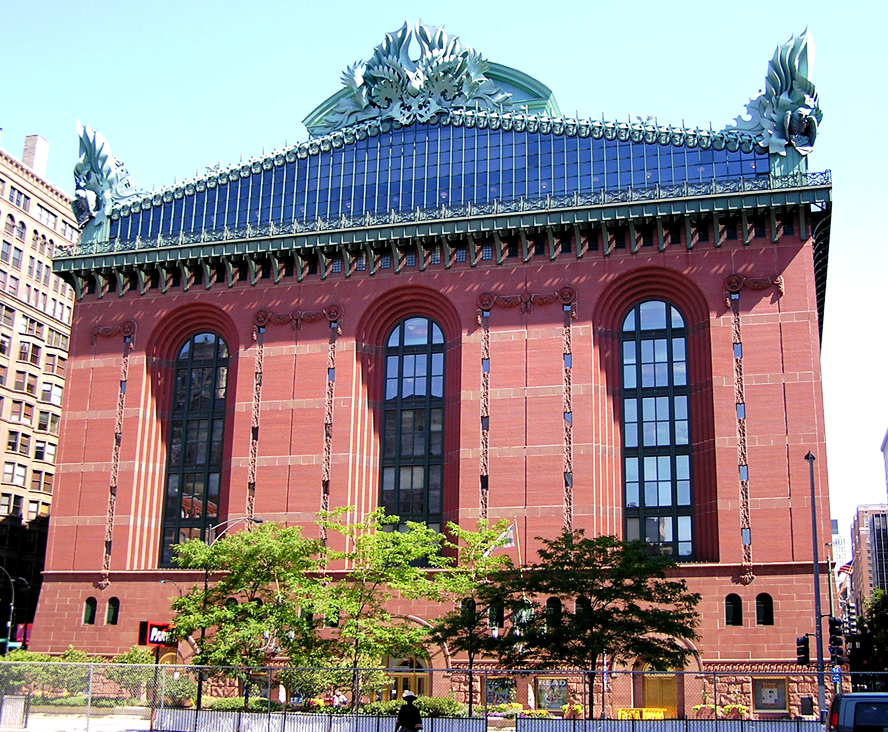
Harold Washington Library

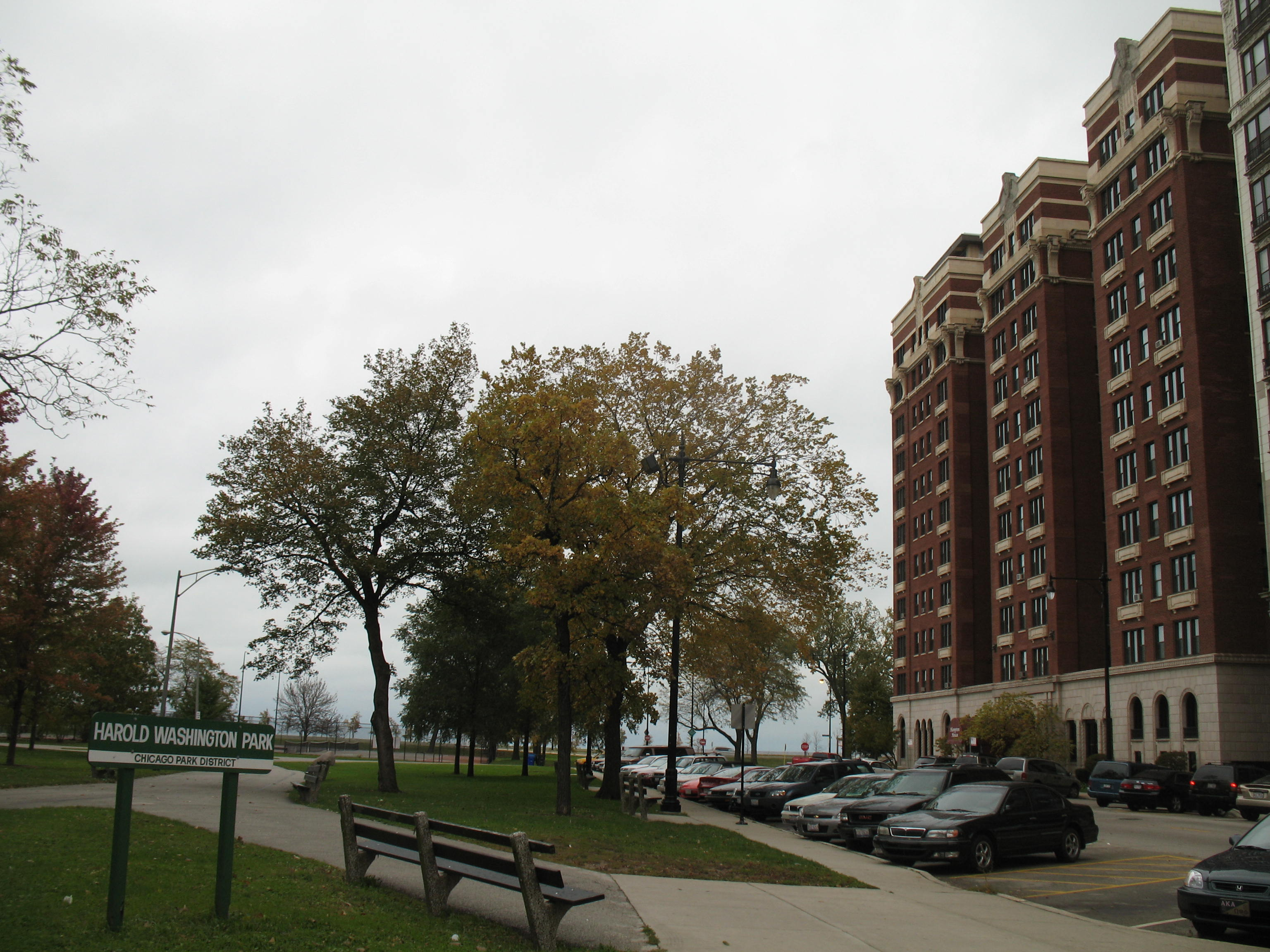
Harold Washington Park

At a party held shortly after his re-election on April 7, 1987, Washington said to a group of supporters, "In the old days, when you told people in other countries that you were from Chicago, they would say, 'Boom-boom! Rat-a-tat-tat!' Nowadays, they say [crowd joins with him], 'How's Harold?'!"

In later years, various city facilities and institutions were named or renamed after the late mayor to commemorate his legacy. The new building housing the main branch of the Chicago Public Library, located at 400 South State Street, was named the Harold Washington Library Center. The Chicago Public Library Special Collections, located on the building's 9th floor, house the Harold Washington Archives and Collections. These archives hold numerous collections related to Washington's life and political career. The building also contains Jacob Lawrence's mural Events in the Life of Harold Washington.

Five months after Washington's sudden death in office, a ceremony was held on April 19, 1988, changing the name of Loop College, one of the City Colleges of Chicago, to Harold Washington College. Harold Washington Elementary School in Chicago's Chatham neighborhood is also named after the former mayor. In August 2004, the 40,000-square-foot (3,700 m^{2}) Harold Washington Cultural Center opened to the public in the Bronzeville neighborhood. Across from the Hampton House apartments where Washington lived, a city park was renamed Harold Washington Park, which was known for "Harold's Parakeets", a colony of feral monk parakeets that inhabited ash trees in the park. A building on the campus of Chicago State University is named Harold Washington Hall.

Six months after Washington's death, School of the Art Institute of Chicago student David Nelson painted Mirth & Girth, a full-length portrait depicting Washington wearing women's lingerie. The work was unveiled on May 11, 1988, opening day of SAIC's annual student exhibition. Within hours, City aldermen and members of the Chicago Police Department seized the painting. It was later returned, but with a five-inch (13 cm) gash in the canvas. Nelson, assisted by the ACLU, filed a federal lawsuit against the city, claiming that the painting's confiscation and subsequent damaging violated his First Amendment rights. The complainants eventually split a US$95,000 (1994, US$138,000 in 2008) settlement from the city.

In 1989, the Near South Planning Board established the Harold Washington Literary Award, given annually, which "recognizes diverse and stimulating authors who address issues of contemporary life and whose literary achievements include a significant body of work that has touched the public mind and imagination."

== Electoral history ==
=== Illinois State Representative ===
1964 Illinois House of Representatives general election (Note: This is a pulled list of ten candidates with similar vote totals to Harold Washington as the original ballot had 236 candidates.)
Party	Candidate	Votes	%
. . .	. . .	. . .	. . .
Democratic	Leland J. Kennedy (incumbent)		
Democratic	Paul E. Rink (incumbent)		
Democratic	James D. Carrigan (incumbent)		
Democratic	Joe W. Russell (incumbent)		
Democratic	Melvin McNairy		
Democratic	Harold Washington		
Democratic	John Jerome (Jack) Hill (incumbent)		
Democratic	Clyde Lee (incumbent)		
Democratic	Clyde L. Choate (incumbent)		
Democratic	Charles Ed Schaefer (incumbent)		
. . .	. . .	. . .	. . .
Total votes			

Illinois's 26th Representative District Democratic primary, 1966
Party	Candidate	Votes	%
Democratic	Harold Washington (incumbent)	28,426.5	57.9
Democratic	Owen D. Pelt	17,035.5	34.6
Democratic	Peggy Smith Martin	3,818	7.8
Total votes		49,280	100

Illinois's 26th Representative District general election, 1966
Party	Candidate	Votes	%
Democratic	Harold Washington (incumbent)	55,513	44.2
Democratic	Owen D. Pelt	53,783.5	42.8
Republican	J. Horace Gardner	16,294.5	100
Total votes		125,591	100

Illinois's 26th Representative District Democratic primary, 1968
Party	Candidate	Votes	%
Democratic	Harold Washington (incumbent)	17,670.5	51.6
Democratic	Owen D. Pelt (incumbent)	12,153	35.5
Democratic	Peggy Smith Martin	2,367	6.9
Democratic	Ulmer D. Lynch Jr.	2,067	6.0
Total votes		34,257.5	100

Illinois's 26th Representative District general election, 1968
Party	Candidate	Votes	%
Democratic	Harold Washington (incumbent)	70,203.5	48.3
Democratic	James C. Taylor	65,616	45.1
Republican	J. Horace Gardner (incumbent)	9,571.5	6.6
Total votes		145,391	100

Illinois's 26th Representative District Democratic primary, 1970
Party	Candidate	Votes	%
Democratic	James C. Taylor (incumbent)	21,072.5	53.4
Democratic	Harold Washington (incumbent)	14,828.5	37.6
Democratic	Peggy Smith Martin	1,916.5	4.9
Democratic	Clyde Exson	1,654.5	4.2
Total votes		39,472	100

Illinois's 26th Representative District general election, 1970
Party	Candidate	Votes	%
Democratic	James C. Taylor (incumbent)	45,686	48.0
Democratic	Harold Washington (incumbent)	42,996	45.2
Republican	J. Horace Gardner (incumbent)	6,461.5	6.7
Total votes		95,143.5	100

Illinois's 26th Legislative District Representative Democratic primary, 1972
Party	Candidate	Votes	%
Democratic	Harold Washington (incumbent)	26,123	40.1
Democratic	Peggy Smith Martin	21,199	32.5
Democratic	James C. Taylor (incumbent)	17,876.5	27.4
Total votes		65,198.5	100

Illinois's 26th Legislative District Representative general election, 1972
Party	Candidate	Votes	%
Democratic	Harold Washington (incumbent)	49,706.5	37.2
Democratic	Peggy Smith Martin	47,527.5	35.6
Independent	James C. Taylor (incumbent)	25,240	18.9
Republican	Maurice Beacham	11,042	8.3
Total votes		133,516	100

Illinois's 26th Legislative District Representative Democratic primary, 1974
Party	Candidate	Votes	%
Democratic	James C. Taylor (incumbent)	27,999	54.0
Democratic	Harold Washington (incumbent)	12,854.5	24.8
Democratic	Peggy Smith Martin (incumbent)	10,960	21.2
Total votes		51,813.5	100

Illinois's 26th Legislative District Representative general election, 1974
Party	Candidate	Votes	%
Democratic	Harold Washington (incumbent)	30,556.5	41.4
Democratic	James C. Taylor (incumbent)	29,764.5	40.3
Independent	Taylor Pouncey	8,685.5	11.8
Republican	Jerry Washington Jr.	2,990.5	4.1
Republican	Magnolia Prowell	1,817	2.5
Total votes		73,814	100

=== Illinois State Senator ===
Illinois's 26th Legislative District Senator Democratic primary, 1976
Party	Candidate	Votes	%
Democratic	Harold Washington (incumbent)	9,030	56.7
Democratic	Anna R. Langford	6,897	43.3
Total votes		15,927	100

Illinois's 26th Legislative District Senator general election, 1976
Party	Candidate	Votes	%
Democratic	Harold Washington (incumbent)	42,365	95.2
Republican	Edward F. Brown	2,147	4.8
Total votes		44,512	100

Illinois's 26th Legislative District Senator Democratic primary, 1978
Party	Candidate	Votes	%
Democratic	Harold Washington (incumbent)	8,953	49.3
Democratic	Clarence C. Barry	8,734	48.1
Democratic	Sabrina A. Washington	459	2.5
Total votes		18,146	100

Illinois's 26th Legislative District Senator general election, 1978
Party	Candidate	Votes	%
Democratic	Harold Washington (incumbent)	21,291	81.4
Citizens For Taylor Pouncey	Clarence C. Barry	4,854	18.6
Total votes		26,145	100

=== U.S. Congressman ===
Illinois's 1st congressional district Democratic primary, 1980
Party	Candidate	Votes	%
Democratic	Harold Washington	30,522	47.7
Democratic	Ralph H. Metcalfe Jr.	12,356	19.3
Democratic	Bennett M. Stewart (incumbent)	10,810	16.9
Democratic	John H. Stroger Jr.	10,284	16.1
Write-in		11	nil
Total votes		63,983	100

Illinois's 1st congressional district general election, 1980
Party	Candidate	Votes	%
Democratic	Harold Washington	119,562	95.5
Republican	George Williams	5,660	4.5
Write-in		1	nil
Total votes		125,223	100

Illinois's 1st congressional district Democratic primary, 1982
Party	Candidate	Votes	%
Democratic	Harold Washington (incumbent)	69,799	100
Write-in		8	nil
Total votes		69,807	100

Illinois's 1st congressional district general election, 1982
Party	Candidate	Votes	%
Democratic	Harold Washington (incumbent)	172,641	97.3
Republican	Charles Allen Taliaferro	4,820	2.7
Write-in		1	nil
Total votes		177,462	100

=== Chicago Mayor ===
Chicago mayoral special Democratic primary, 1977
Party	Candidate	Votes	%
Democratic	Michael A. Bilandic (incumbent)	368,404	51.1
Democratic	Roman Pucinski	235,795	32.7
Democratic	Harold Washington	77,322	10.7
Democratic	Edward Hanrahan	28,643	4.0
Democratic	Anthony Robert Martin-Trignona	6,674	0.9
Democratic	Ellis Reid	4,022	0.6
Total votes		720,860	100

Chicago mayoral Democratic primary, 1983
Party	Candidate	Votes	%
Democratic	Harold Washington	424,324	36.3
Democratic	Jane Byrne (incumbent)	393,500	33.6
Democratic	Richard M. Daley	346,835	29.7
Democratic	Frank R. Ranallo	2,367	0.2
Democratic	William Markowski	1,412	0.1
Democratic	Sheila Jones	1,285	0.1
Total votes		1,169,723	100

Chicago mayoral election, 1983
Party	Candidate	Votes	%
Democratic	Harold Washington	668,176	51.7
Republican	Bernard Epton	619,926	48.0
Socialist Workers	Eddie L. Warren	3,756	0.3
Total votes		1,291,858	100

Chicago mayoral Democratic primary, 1987
Party	Candidate	Votes	%
Democratic	Harold Washington (incumbent)	586,841	53.5
Democratic	Jane Byrne	507,603	46.3
Democratic	Sheila Jones	2,549	0.2
Total votes		1,096,993	100

Chicago mayoral election, 1987
Party	Candidate	Votes	%
Democratic	Harold Washington (incumbent)	600,290	53.8
Illinois Solidarity Party	Edward Vrdolyak	468,493	42.0
Republican	Donald Haider	47,652	4.3
Total votes		1,116,435	100

== See also ==
- List of African-American United States representatives
- Ed Lee, the first Asian American Mayor of San Francisco, who also died in office of a heart attack at the same age as Washington
- Events in the Life of Harold Washington (mural)

== Notes ==
U.S. House of Representatives
Preceded by Bennett Stewart	Member of the U.S. House of Representatives from Illinois's 1st congressional district January 3, 1981 – April 30, 1983	Succeeded by Charles A. Hayes
Political offices
Preceded by Jane Byrne	Mayor of Chicago; April 29, 1983 – November 25, 1987	Succeeded by David Orr
