= Jaime Andrade Jr. =

American politician

Jaime Andrade
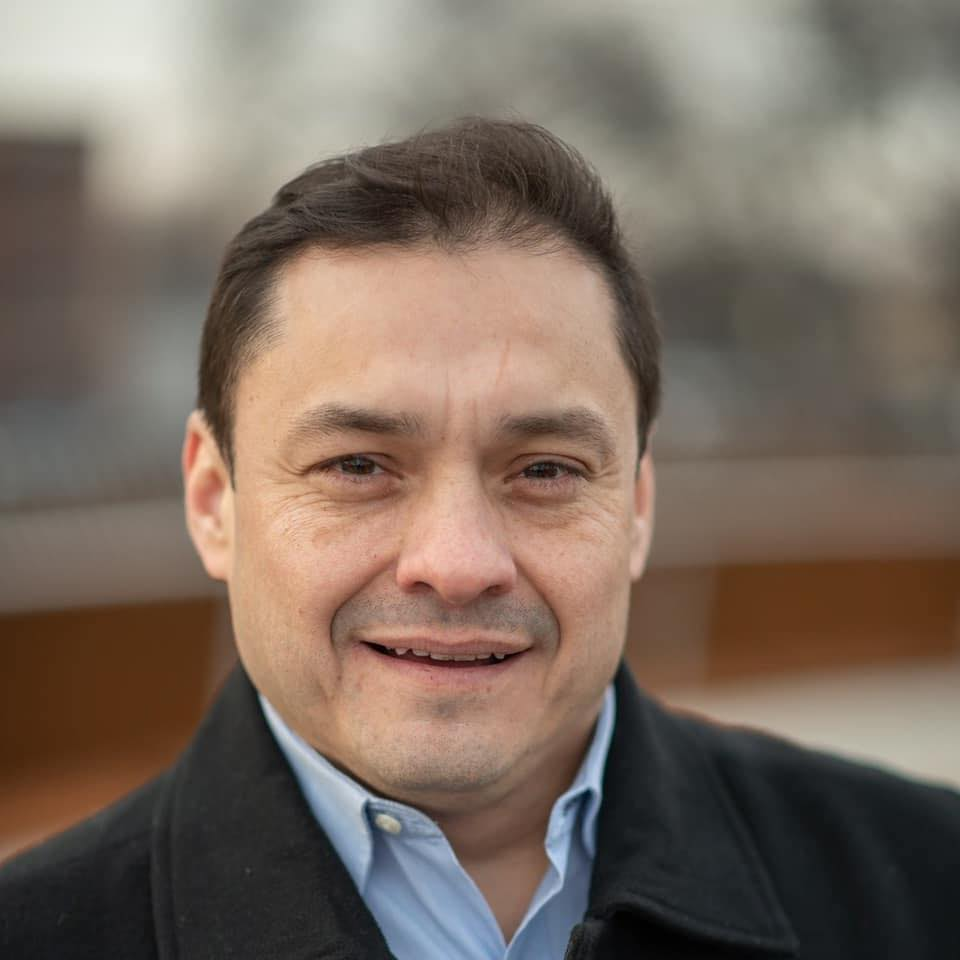

Member of the Illinois House of Representatives from the 40th district
- Incumbent
- Assumed office August 12, 2013
- Preceded by: Deb Mell
- Succeeded by: Miguel Alvelo-Rivera (elect)

Personal details
- Born: October 7, 1972 (age 54) Chicago, Illinois, U.S.
- Party: Democratic
- Spouse: Karen
- Education: DePaul University (BS, MS)

Jaime M. Andrade Jr. is the State Representative for Illinois' 40th District. He has served as a member of the Illinois House of Representatives since 2013. During his tenure, he has prioritized legislation that keeps pace with technology, protects the environment, and improves community safety. He won his first election in 2014, and was re-elected as a Democrat in 2016, 2018, and 2020. He acts in leadership as Assistant House Majority Leader.

== District ==
Andrade's current district is located on the northwest side of Chicago and includes Avondale, Irving Park, and Albany Park. The legislative remap following the 2020 Census will incorporate parts of North Center, Roscoe Village, and West Lakeview into Andrade's district.

== Biography ==
A long-time community leader and resident of the Irving Park neighborhood, Andrade has been praised for his community clean up efforts, making headlines when local pigeons took issue with his push for funds to clean up the local Blue Line (CTA) station. From 1998 until his appointment to the General Assembly he was an assistant to former Chicago alderman Richard Mell; he was also a Legislative Assistant and Assistant Sergeant-At-Arms for the Chicago City Council. As creator and former chair of the Cybersecurity, Data Analytics & IT Committee, Andrade wrote the first-of-its-kind legislation regulating the use of Artificial Intelligence (AI) in Illinois. The Artificial Intelligence Video Interview Act regulates Illinois employers’ use of AI in the interview and hiring process.

== Tenure ==
=== Committee assignments ===
Andrade is the founder and former Chairperson of the Cybersecurity, Data Analytics & IT Committee for the IL House of Representatives and is presently a member of the following committees and subcommittees:

- Appropriations-General Services
- Cybersecurity, Data Analytics & IT Committee
- Executive
- Financial Institutions
- Human Services
- Labor & Commerce
- Public Benefits Subcommittee
- Small Business, Technology, and Innovation
- Wage Policy & Study Subcommittee

=== Legislation ===
Andrade has focused on crafting pro-active legislation that keeps Illinois up-to-date with the latest technological advances, protects the environment, and bolsters Illinois' fiscal health. He passed the first of its kind law banning the manufacture and sale of personal care products containing harmful plastic microbeads, a version of which was later signed into federal law by President Barack Obama. In 2021, he carried the Automatic Renewal Contract Act to make cancelling subscriptions easier for online consumers, which later became law. That same year, he also carried the Illinois Sick Leave Act for Aviation Workers in the House. Taking effect in 2022, this allows more than 30,000 aviation workers in Illinois to use employer-provided sick leave to care for ill or injured loved ones.

=== Political positions ===
Andrade supports affordable child care, community safety initiatives, elected school boards, environmental protections, immigrant reform, a socially and fiscally responsible state budget, small business relief, and a $15 minimum wage. He has a 100% voting record with the Illinois Environmental Council .

== Electoral history ==
For the 2020 primary election, Andrade has been endorsed by:

- US Congressman Jesús "Chuy" García
- US Congressman Mike Quigley
- Planned Parenthood
- The Chicago Teachers Union
- Illinois Federation of Teachers
- Personal PAC
- Illinois AFL-CIO
- The Sierra Club
- Chicago Sun-Times
- Illinois Nurses Association
- International Union of Operating Engineers Local 150
- Equality Illinois
- Citizen Action Illinois
- Stand for Children PAC
- IL National Organization for Women
- Gun Violence Prevention PAC Illinois
- SEIU State Council
- Northside Democracy for America
- Alderman Carlos Ramirez Rosa
- Alderman Scott Waguespack
- State Senator Ram Villivalam
- State Representative Will Guzzardi

Illinois 40th State House District Democratic Primary, 2014
Party	Candidate	Votes	%
Democratic	Jaime M. Andrade, Jr. (incumbent)	2,917	50.20
Democratic	Nancy Schiavone	1,585	27.28
Democratic	Aaron Goldstein	617	10.62
Democratic	Wendy Jo Harmston	376	6.47
Democratic	Mark Pasieka	303	5.21
Democratic	Melanie "Mel" Ferrand	13	0.22
Total votes		5,811	100.0

Illinois 40th State House District General Election, 2014
Party	Candidate	Votes	%
Democratic	Jaime M. Andrade, Jr. (incumbent)	14,861	100.0
Total votes		14,861	100.0

For the 2016 primary election, Andrade was endorsed by:

- The Chicago Teachers' Union
- Illinois Federation of Teachers
- Equality Illinois
- Planned Parenthood Illinois Action Committee
- Citizen Action Illinois
- SEIU State Council
- Associated Firefighters of Illinois
- Alderman Carlos Ramirez Rosa
- Alderman Nicholas Sposato
- 45th Ward Independent Democrats and 45th Ward Democratic Committeeman and Alderman John Arena

Illinois 40th State House District Democratic Primary, 2016
Party	Candidate	Votes	%
Democratic	Jaime M. Andrade, Jr. (incumbent)	12,886	59.39
Democratic	Harish I. Patel	8,812	40.61
Total votes		21,698	100.0

Illinois 40th State House District General Election, 2016
Party	Candidate	Votes	%
Democratic	Jaime M. Andrade, Jr. (incumbent)	29,845	100.0
Total votes		29,845	100.0

Illinois 40th State House District General Election, 2018
Party	Candidate	Votes	%
Democratic	Jaime M. Andrade, Jr. (incumbent)	27,755	99.98
Write-in votes	William Cade	6	0.02
Total votes		27,761	100.0

Illinois 40th State House District Democratic Primary, 2020
Party	Candidate	Votes	%
Democratic	Jaime M. Andrade, Jr. (incumbent)	11,687	65.02
Democratic	Syamala Krishnamsetty	6,287	34.98
Total votes		17,974	100.0
