= Lura Lynn Ryan =

First Lady of the U.S. state of Illinois (1934–2011)

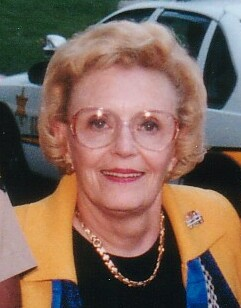
- Ryan in 2007

First Lady of Illinois
- In role January 11, 1999 – January 13, 2003
- Governor: George Ryan
- Preceded by: Brenda Edgar
- Succeeded by: Patricia Blagojevich

Second Lady of Illinois
- In role January 10, 1983 – January 14, 1991
- Governor: James R. Thompson
- Preceded by: Sandra O'Neal
- Succeeded by: Kathy Kustra

Personal details
- Born: Lura Lynn Lowe; July 5, 1934 Aroma Park, Illinois, US
- Died: June 27, 2011 (aged 76) Kankakee, Illinois, US
- Resting place: Kankakee Memorial Gardens and Chapel Mausoleum; Kankakee, Illinois
- Party: Republican
- Spouse: George Ryan (m. 1956)
- Children: 6
- Education: Moser Business College; Kankakee High School

Lura Lynn Ryan (July 5, 1934 – June 27, 2011) was the First Lady of the U.S. state of Illinois from 1999 to 2003. She was the wife of Illinois Governor George Ryan.

== Early life ==
Lura Lynn Lowe was born in Aroma Park, Illinois to Lawrence and Dorothea Lowe. Her family (originally from Germany) had lived there since 1834. Lawrence owned a hybrid seed company, and Dorothea was a Kankakee County school trustee. Lowe was raised on a family farm near Aroma Park.

== Political spouse ==
Her husband, George, entered politics when he was elected to the Illinois House of Representatives in 1972, with Ryan becoming a political spouse while simultaneously raising six small children.

=== First Lady of Illinois ===
Ryan became the First Lady of Illinois on January 11, 1999. She sought to become an active Illinois First Lady similar to her predecessors, Jayne Thompson and Brenda Edgar. Ryan was considered particularly devoted the arts and to issues involving drug and alcohol abuse, organ donation, historic preservation. Ryan's efforts also focused on US president from the mid-19th century, Abraham Lincoln. She became a major fundraiser and first chairwoman of the Abraham Lincoln Presidential Library and Museum, which opened in 2005 in Springfield, Illinois. She launched the fundraising for the library by raising $250,000. Ryan also organized a program in which Illinois schoolchildren collected pennies for the construction of the presidential library, which raised $47,000. Ryan was appointed to the 14-member Abraham Lincoln Bicentennial Commission by the Speaker of the United States House of Representatives to commemorate the 200th birthday of former Abraham Lincoln in 2009. She served on the commission from 2001 to 2010.

She supported efforts to restore funding to the Illinois Department of Alcohol and Substance Abuse and drug prevention programs. Ryan supported after school programs and literacy campaigns aimed at discouraging drug use among young people in Illinois. The anti-drug nonprofit, Prevention First, honored Lura Lynn Ryan's work by naming two research libraries in Springfield and Chicago for her. Together, the two libraries hold one of the United States' largest collections on substance abuse.

Ryan collaborated with former Illinois Governor James Thompson to raise $250,000 to acquire 19th Century Amish quilts then housed by the Illinois State Museum. Ryan traveled with her husband on official international trips to promote Illinois products, including to Cuba, where they met with then President Fidel Castro, and South Africa, where she met Nelson Mandela.

She co-authored a book, At Home with Illinois Governors: A Social History of the Illinois Executive Mansion, 1855-2003, with historian Dan Monroe in 2002 on the history of Illinois Governors and their families. She further promoted and spearheaded the success of Made in Illinois, a catalog which had been first launched in 1988 to promote crafts and other products produced in Illinois.

Ryan launched several renovations Illinois Executive Mansion. She refurbished much of the furniture in the mansion using private donations through the Executive Mansion Association. In particular, Ryan fixed items in the mansion's Kankakee Room, which honors former Illinois governors from Kankakee County — Lennington Small, Samuel H. Shapiro and her husband, George Ryan.

Ryan left her position as First Lady in 2003 at the end of her husband's term in office.

== Personal life and death ==
Lowe met her future husband, George Ryan, while both were students in a freshman English class at Kankakee High School. Lowe mulled becoming a nurse following high school, but decided against that career path. She received a degree from the former Moser Business College.

She married Ryan at the Asbury United Methodist Church in Kankakee, Illinois, on June 10, 1956, after dating for eight years. The couple had six children, including one group of triplets. Their first child, Nancy, was born in 1957; daughter, Lynda, was born in 1961; triplets, Jeanette, Joanne and Julie were born in 1962; and her youngest, George Jr., was born in 1964. None of her children entered politics.

Former Governor George Ryan was convicted of corruption in 2006 after a long trial. George Ryan was found guilty of using his office to for political benefits while serving as Governor and Secretary of State, as well as provided favorable state contracts to friends He was sent to prison in Indiana. Lura Lynn Ryan remained personally supportive of her husband. She wrote a letter in 2008 to former U.S. First Lady Barbara Bush appealing for clemency from President George W. Bush.

Lura Lynn Ryan was diagnosed with cancer during her later years. Her husband, George Ryan, was temporarily released from prison in Terre Haute, Indiana, on four occasions between January and June 2011 as his wife's health declined in 2011. According to doctors, she had begun smoking at a very young age and consumed a pack-a-day until her early 60s. Ryan quit smoking after realizing the toll it took on her health. She died from complications of cancer and chemotherapy at a hospital in Kankakee, Illinois, on June 27, 2011, with her husband at her side.

Honorary titles
Preceded by Brenda Edgar	First Lady of Illinois; January 11, 1999 – January 13, 2003	Succeeded by Patricia Blagojevich
