= Rossana Rodriguez-Sanchez =

American politician (born 1978)

Rossana Rodríguez-Sánchez
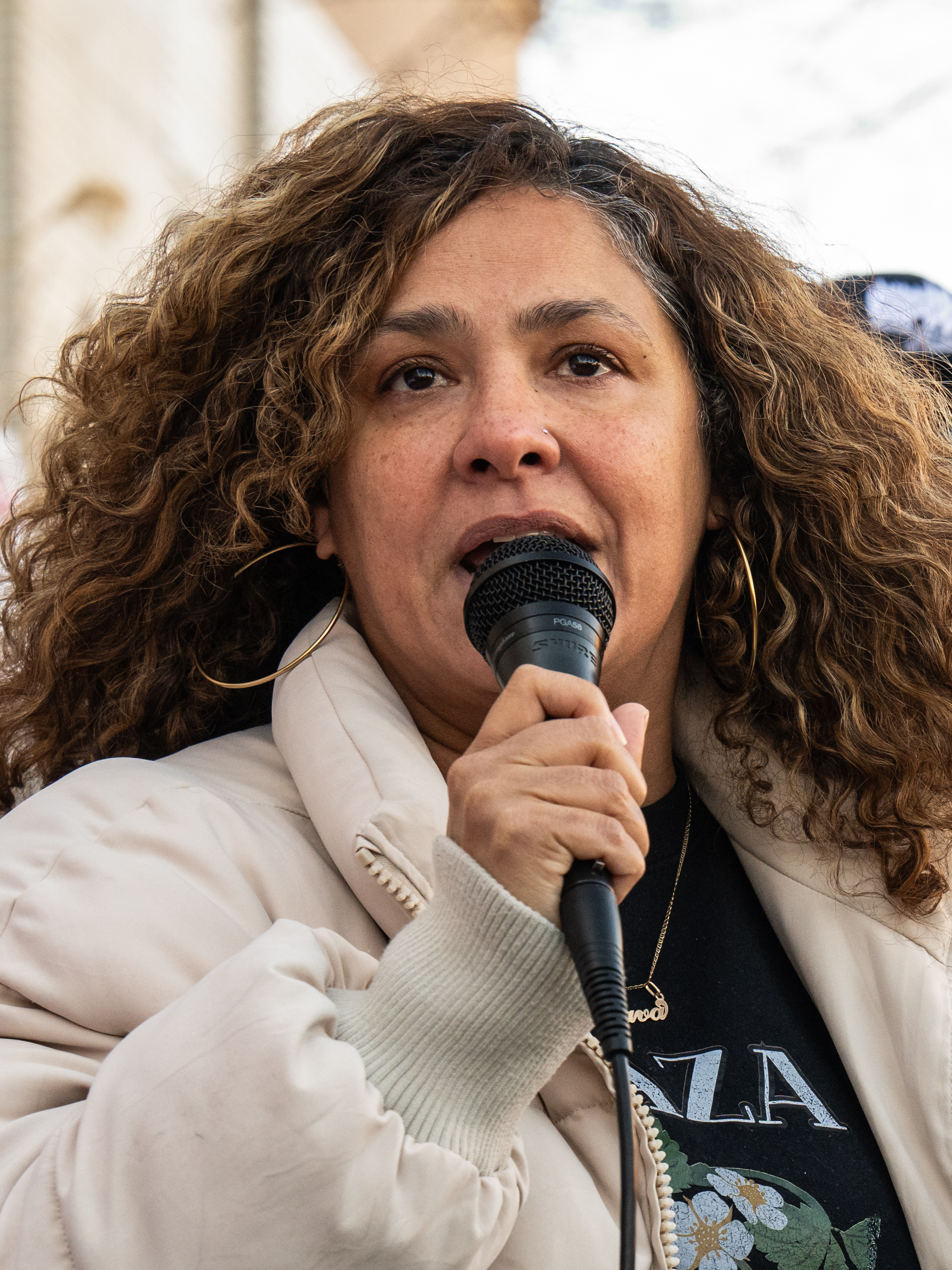
- Rodríguez-Sánchez in 2025

Member of the Chicago City Council from the 33rd ward
- Incumbent
- Assumed office May 20, 2019
- Preceded by: Deb Mell

Personal details
- Born: November 13, 1978 (age 48) Humacao, Puerto Rico, U.S.
- Party: Democratic
- Education: University of Puerto Rico, Río Piedras (BA); University of Manchester (MA)
- Website: Campaign website

Rossana Rodríguez-Sánchez (born November 13, 1978) is a Chicago politician and community organizer. She is the alderwoman of Chicago's 33rd ward, having taken office as a member of the Chicago City Council in May 2019. She won election to that office after defeating incumbent Deb Mell in the 2019 Chicago aldermanic elections. She is a member of the Democratic Socialists of America. She also serves as the Democratic committeeperson for the 33rd ward.

== Early life, education, and career ==
Rodriguez-Sanchez was born in Humacao, Puerto Rico. Her father was a community organizer, and Rodriguez-Sanchez cites attending a protest against the Roosevelt Roads Naval Station's practice of diverting water from her community as one of her earliest moments of political consciousness. She received a Bachelor’s in Theater Education from the University of Puerto Rico at Río Piedras in 2003, and a Master’s in Applied Theater from the University of Manchester in 2007.

Rodriguez-Sanchez worked as a drama teacher in Puerto Rico before austerity cuts to public education on the island led her to move to Albany Park, Chicago where she worked as Resident Director of the Albany Park Theater Project. While working with APTP to create community theater that reflected the daily struggles of people in working-class, largely immigrant community, Rodriguez-Sanchez became involved with the Immigrant Youth Justice League, an organization led by undocumented youth to combat deportations.

== Chicago City Council ==
=== 2019 campaign ===
After announcing her intention to run for 33rd Ward Alderman in May 2018, Rodriguez-Sanchez drew a comparison by —Chicago Reader to Alexandria Ocasio-Cortez, a fellow Democratic Socialists of America member of Puerto Rican heritage who won a U.S. House Democratic primary election in June 2018 as a heavy underdog. Rodriguez-Sanchez placed first in the February 26, 2019 general election with 42.1% of the vote, advancing to a head-to-head runoff with the incumbent Deb Mell. She won the April 2, 2019 runoff election by 13 votes, ending nearly 44 years of Mell family control of the 33rd Ward seat.

=== Aldermanic career ===
Rodriguez Sanchez assumed office as a member of Chicago City Council on May 20, 2019, and is chair of the Chicago City Council Latino Caucus and a member of the Socialist and Progressive Reform Caucuses.

In July 2019, in response to President Donald Trump's threats of U.S. Immigration and Customs Enforcement raids against undocumented immigrants in major U.S. cites, the offices of Rodriguez Sanchez and her colleague Carlos Ramirez-Rosa organized neighborhood defense brigades to patrol Albany Park in order to monitor ICE activity and disseminate know-your-rights information. Rodriguez Sanchez would later sponsor legislation to close loopholes in Chicago's sanctuary city ordinance, and the strengthened protections were signed into law in February 2021.

In November 2019, Rodriguez Sanchez was one of eleven aldermen to vote against Mayor Lori Lightfoot's first budget. She joined all five other members of the Socialist Caucus in signing a letter to Lightfoot which criticized her budget for "an over-reliance on property taxes" and "regressive funding models" that are "burdensome to our working-class citizens, while giving the wealthy and large corporations a pass." In November 2020, Rodriguez Sanchez again voted against Mayor Lightfoot's budget proposal which included a $94 million property tax hike and a provision instituting future property tax increases tied to the rate of inflation.

After the Supreme Court of the United States ruled in Dobbs v. Jackson Women's Health Organization to overrule Roe v. Wade and Planned Parenthood v. Casey, Rodriguez Sanchez introduced the Bodily Autonomy Sanctuary City Ordinance. The ordinance, which was passed into law in September 2022, prohibits the Chicago Police Department and all other city agencies from cooperating with criminal investigations launched by state or federal authorities targeting women who travel to Chicago seeking abortions and other reproductive healthcare. The law also protects "those seeking gender-affirming care in Chicago, medical providers who treat those patients and others who help those patients, such as by providing information, transportation and housing."

=== Israel-Palestine conflict ===
Rodriguez-Sanchez is a critic of Israel, which has itself elicited controversy and criticism. In the context of the Gaza war, she was criticized for endorsing the slogan "From the river, to the sea" in November 2023 and for tweeting "Free Palestine" during Iran's April 2024 missile attack on Israel. In May 2024, Debra Silverstein, the City Council's sole Jewish member at the time, accused Rodriguez-Sanchez of using an anti-semitic dog whistle in soliciting recommendations for an "anti-Zionist pediatrician" in a Facebook post.

== Electoral history ==
Chicago 33rd Ward Aldermanic election, 2019: General
Party	Candidate	Votes	%
Nonpartisan	Rossana Rodriguez-Sanchez	4,567	42.0
Nonpartisan	Deborah L. Mell (incumbent)	4,497	41.4
Nonpartisan	Katie Sieracki	1,812	16.7
Total votes		10,876	100

Chicago 33rd Ward Aldermanic election, 2019: Runoff
Party	Candidate	Votes	%
Nonpartisan	Rossana Rodriguez-Sanchez	5,754	50.06
Nonpartisan	Deborah L. Mell	5,741	49.94
Total votes		11,495	100.00

Chicago 33rd Ward Aldermanic election, 2023: General
Party	Candidate	Votes	%
Nonpartisan	Rossana Rodriguez-Sanchez (incumbent)	5,814	54.7
Nonpartisan	Samie Martinez	3,604	33.9
Nonpartisan	Laith Shaaban	1,212	11.4
Total votes		10,630	100

== See also ==
- List of Chicago alderpersons since 1923
- List of Democratic Socialists of America who have held office in the United States
