= Patricia Blagojevich =

First Lady of Illinois from 2003 to 2009

Patti Blagojevich
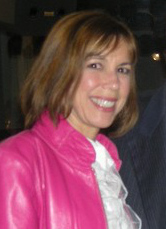
- Blagojevich in 2009

First Lady of Illinois
- In role January 13, 2003 – January 29, 2009
- Governor: Rod Blagojevich
- Preceded by: Lura Lynn Ryan
- Succeeded by: Diana Rauner (2015)

Personal details
- Born: Patricia Mell; April 9, 1965 (age 61) Chicago, Illinois, U.S.
- Party: Democratic
- Spouse: Rod Blagojevich (m. 1990)
- Children: 2
- Parent: Richard Mell (father)
- Relatives: Deb Mell (sister)

Patricia Mell "Patti" Blagojevich (born April 9, 1965), née Mell, is the former First Lady of Illinois and wife of Rod Blagojevich, the former Governor of Illinois, who was impeached and removed from office. She served as First Lady of Illinois from January 2003 to January 2009. She is the daughter of former Chicago City Council Alderman Richard Mell and the sister of former Alderman Deb Mell.

== Personal life ==
Blagojevich was born Patricia Mell, the daughter of former Chicago alderman Richard Mell. She earned her bachelor's degree in economics from the University of Illinois at Urbana–Champaign. Her sister Deb Mell served in the Illinois State House of Representatives from 2009 to 2013, and on the Chicago City Council from 2013 to 2019. She is friends with ex-professional basketball player John Salley.

== First Lady ==
As First Lady of Illinois, Blagojevich supported the illiteracy eradication initiatives and the Illinois Pediatric Vision Initiative.

In 2009 she was fired from a $100,000-a-year fundraising job after controversy regarding alleged taped statements. Blagojevich was also subpoenaed in February 2009 for documents related to her husband's political campaign and her work as a real estate agent.

== I'm a Celebrity...Get Me out of Here! ==
In 2009, after her husband was removed as Governor of Illinois, Blagojevich appeared as a contestant on NBC reality show, I'm a Celebrity…Get Me out of Here. She placed fourth on the show.

Honorary titles
Preceded by Lura Lynn Ryan	First Lady of Illinois; 2003–2009	Succeeded by Diana Rauner
