= Miguel Alvelo-Rivera =

Puerto Rican-born American politician

Member-elect of the Illinois House of Representatives from the 40th district
- Assuming office January 2027
- Succeeding: Jaime Andrade Jr.

Personal details
- Born: San Juan, Puerto Rico
- Party: Democratic

Miguel Alvelo-Rivera is a Puerto Rican-born American politician. A member of the Democratic Party, he is the member-elect for the 40th district of the Illinois House of Representatives.
