= Deb Mell =

American politician

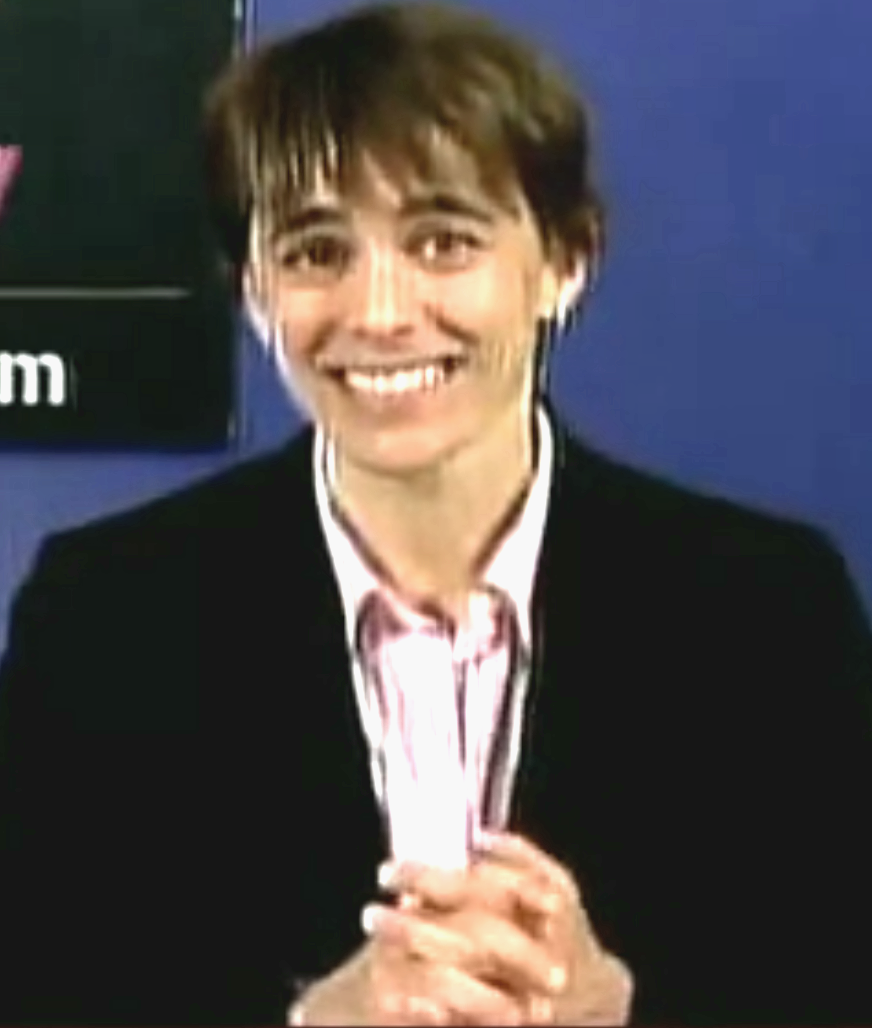
- Mell in 2014

Member of the Chicago City Council from the 33rd ward
- In office July 24, 2013 – May 20, 2019
- Preceded by: Richard Mell
- Succeeded by: Rossana Rodriguez-Sanchez

Member of the Illinois House of Representatives from the 40th district
- In office January 14, 2009 – July 24, 2013
- Preceded by: Rich Bradley
- Succeeded by: Jaime Andrade Jr.

Personal details
- Born: July 30, 1968 (age 58) Chicago, Illinois, U.S.
- Party: Democratic
- Spouse: Christin Baker (m. 2011; div. 2014)
- Parent(s): Richard Mell; Marge Mell
- Relatives: Patricia (sister); Rod Blagojevich (brother-in-law)
- Education: Cornell College
- Website: debmell.org

Deborah L. Mell (born July 30, 1968) is an American politician from Chicago. She is a Democrat and was formerly a member of the Chicago City Council, representing the 33rd ward from 2013 to 2019. She previously served in the Illinois House of Representatives from 2009 to 2013.

== Early life, education and career ==
Mell is the daughter of long-time Alderman Richard Mell. Her sister, former Illinois First Lady Patti, is married to former Governor Rod Blagojevich.

Mell was educated in Chicago, at St John Berchman's Elementary School and St Scholastica High School. She then attended Cornell College with a dual major in political science and history, before earning a culinary arts degree from California Culinary Academy.

Mell returned to Chicago in 2000 and began working at Christy Webber Landscape, Chicago's largest landscaping company owned by prominent lesbian Christy Webber.

Mell was arrested in 2004 while protesting her inability to get a same-sex marriage license from the Cook County clerk's office.

== In politics ==
=== State legislature ===
The 40th district, located on Chicago's northwest side, was represented by Rep. Rich Bradley prior to 2008. Bradley was pressured to not seek re-election in 2008 by Ald. Richard Mell after Deb Mell announced her intention to run for the seat, choosing instead to challenge Sen. Iris Martinez for a seat in the Illinois Senate. With the help of her father and of Chairman of the Cook County Democratic Party Joseph Berrios, Mell ran unopposed in the Democratic primary for the seat in the overwhelming Democratic 40th district. Mell's campaign had the support of the Gay & Lesbian Victory Fund. She won 75% of the vote in the general election of November 4, 2008; her opponents, Republican Christine Nere-Foss and Green Party candidate Heather Benno, garnered 15% and 10% respectively.

On January 14, 2009, in one of her first votes in the Illinois House of Representatives, Mell cast the lone vote opposed to impeaching her brother-in-law, then-Governor Rod Blagojevich. This was the second time the House had voted to impeach Blagojevich, and the tally was 117–1.

In November 2008, Mell expressed interest in running in the special election to replace Rahm Emanuel, who would be resigning from the U.S. House of Representatives to serve as President Obama's White House Chief of Staff. Several weeks later, she withdrew from the race.

=== City council ===
In July 2013, Alderman Richard Mell, Deb Mell's father, retired from the city council after nearly 40 years. Mayor Rahm Emanuel was charged with appointing his successor and settled on Deb Mell. The appointment was announced on July 24 and confirmed by the city council later that day.

A member of the city council's Committee on Housing and Real Estate, Mell has been criticized by local activists for her financial ties to real estate developers and her involvement in allowing a developer to evict residents of her ward from their homes.

Mell's tenure in office ended after losing her 2019 reelection bid. After placing second in the general election round of the 2019 Chicago municipal election, Mell was narrowly defeated in a runoff by Rossana Rodriguez-Sanchez.

In the runoff of the 2019 Chicago mayoral election, which coincided with her aldermanic runoff, Mell endorsed Lori Lightfoot. This came despite Lightfoot having, in the first round of Mell's aldermanic reelection campaign, endorsed one of her opponents (Katie Sieracki).

== Personal life ==
Mell is openly lesbian. She was married to Christin Baker from 2011 to 2014. She was one of four openly LGBT members of the Illinois General Assembly, along with Reps. Greg Harris and Kelly Cassidy, both Democrats from Chicago, and Sam Yingling a Democrat from Round Lake Beach, Illinois, in suburban Chicago.

Mell served on former Mayor Richard M. Daley's Advisory Council for Human Relations and is active in numerous LGBT activist groups. She has received a National Organization for Women award for her activism, as well as the Howard Brown Cornerstone Award for community excellence.
