= Harold Washington Library =

Central library of the Chicago Public Library system

Harold Washington Library Center
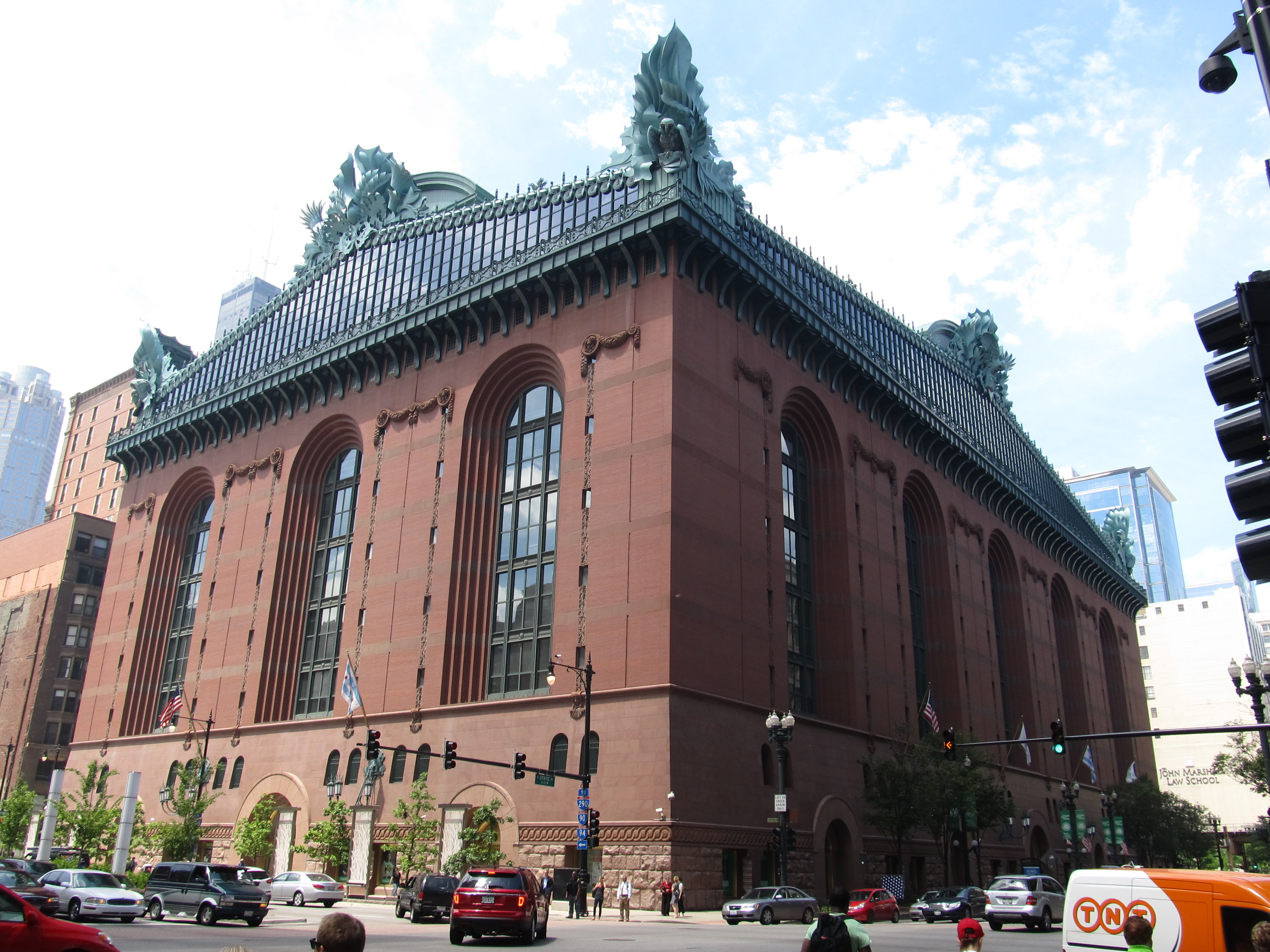

General information
- Architectural style: New Classical Postmodernism
- Location: 400 S. State Street, Chicago, Illinois, United States
- Coordinates: 41°52′35″N 87°37′41″W
- Completed: October 7, 1991
- Client: Chicago Public Library

Technical details
- Material: Red brick and granite exterior
- Floor count: 10
- Floor area: 972,000 square feet

Design and construction
- Architect: Hammond, Beeby and Babka

Other information
- Public transit: State/Van Buren

The Harold Washington Library Center is the central library for the Chicago Public Library System. It is located just south of the Loop 'L', at 400 South State Street in Chicago, in the U.S. state of Illinois. It is a full-service library and is ADA compliant. Opened in 1991, it functionally replaced (after more than a decade) the city's 19th-century central library. The postmodernist building contains approximately 756,000 sq ft (70,200 m^{2}) of work space. The total square footage is approximately 972,000 sq ft (90,300 m^{2}) including the rooftop winter-garden event space. It is named in honor of former Mayor Harold Washington.

== History ==
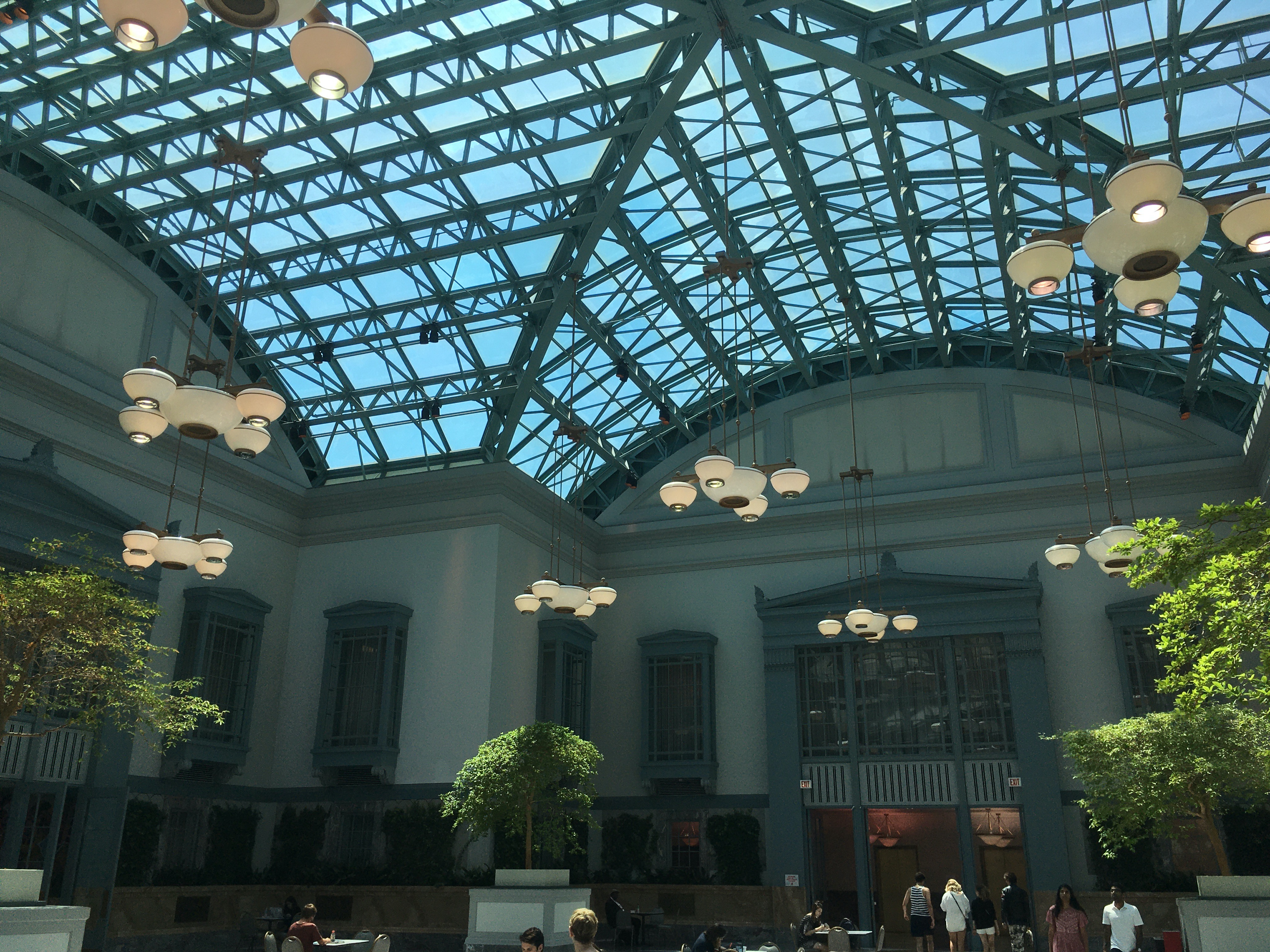
The Library's Winter Garden on the 9th floor

With the conversion of Chicago's former central library into the Chicago Cultural Center in 1977, a long-term temporary central library was opened in the Mandel Building at 425 North Michigan Avenue and much of the library's collection was put into storage. A debate on a new central library ensued and continued throughout most of the 1980s, frustrated by a lack of funding. Upon his election in 1983, Mayor Harold Washington supported the construction of a new central library. After the turmoil of four mayoral administrations in a seven-year period, finally, in 1986 during Washington's tenure, the city and the Library Board picked a location and floated a $175 million bond issue to provide funds for the new building, as well as the entire citywide library branch system. In 1987, a design competition was held by the city to decide on the architecture of the library. Five prominent entries were chosen from design-build coalitions of architects and contractors, representing designs by VOA Associates in collaboration with Arthur Erickson; Hammond, Beeby & Babka; Murphy/Jahn, Lohan Associates, and SOM. The entries were narrowed down to two finalists: The Chicago Library Team with Helmut Jahn's glassy, modern design, and the SEBUS coalition, whose postmodern design by Hammond, Beeby and Babka took elements from nearby historic buildings. Notably, Jahn's design was to have arched over Van Buren Street onto the area that is now occupied by Pritzker Park, incorporating a new elevated station on Chicago's Loop. These elements were deemed too expensive, along with the rest of Jahn's design, so the Hammond, Beeby and Babka design won the competition. The architectural models that the entrant teams created are located on the eighth floor of the Harold Washington Library Center, except the SEBUS entry, which is located in the ninth floor Special Collections.

With the support of Harold Washington and Chicago's wealthy Pritzker family, ground was broken at the chosen site at Congress Parkway and State Street, covering an entire block. Upon the building's completion in 1991, the new mayor, Richard M. Daley, named the building in honor of the now-deceased former mayor Harold Washington, an advocate of reading and education among Chicagoans as well as an advocate of the library's construction. Before 1872, Chicago had mainly private libraries. England responded to the Great Chicago Fire of 1871 by donating over 8,000 books to the city, which became the foundation of the first public library. This collection was housed in a variety of locations, until the Central Library was built in 1891. The Harold Washington Library opened on October 7, 1991. Since completion, the library has appeared in the Guinness Book of Records as the largest public library building in the world. In 2013 the architect and chairman of Hammond, Beeby and Babka, Thomas H. Beeby, won the prestigious Driehaus Architecture Prize for this and other projects.

== Architecture ==
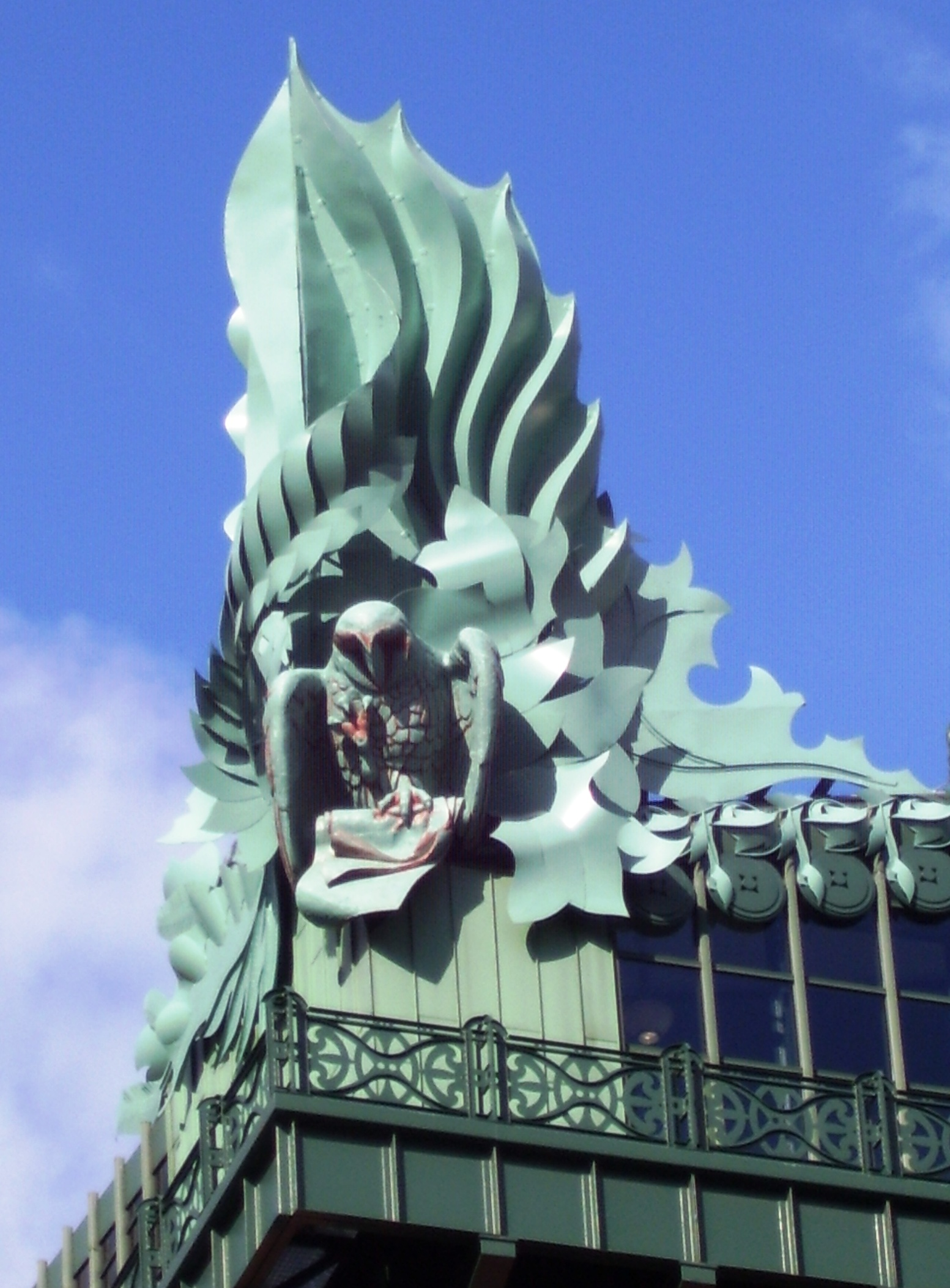
Owl on the southwest corner of the building

=== Exterior ===
The exterior evokes the design of the Rookery, Auditorium and the Monadnock buildings. The bottom portion is made of large granite blocks. Red brick makes up the majority of the exterior. These two portions draw on the Beaux-Art style.

The pediments and most of the west side facing Plymouth Court are glass, steel and aluminum with ornamentation hearkening to the Mannerist style.

In 1993, the roof was ornamented with seven large, painted aluminum acroteria designed by Kent Bloomer with owl figures by Raymond Kaskey. The acroterium on the State Street side depicts an owl, a symbol of knowledge due to its association with the Greek goddess Athena. The acroteria on the Congress Parkway (now Ida. B. Wells Drive) and on the Van Buren sides contain seed pods, which represent the natural bounty of the Midwest. The acroteria angularia each contain an owl perched in foliage.

On the divide between the granite blocks and the brick portions are wall medallions that have the face of Ceres and ears of corn.

On the north, east and south sides of the build are five story tall arched windows. Between the windows are rope friezes.

=== Interior ===
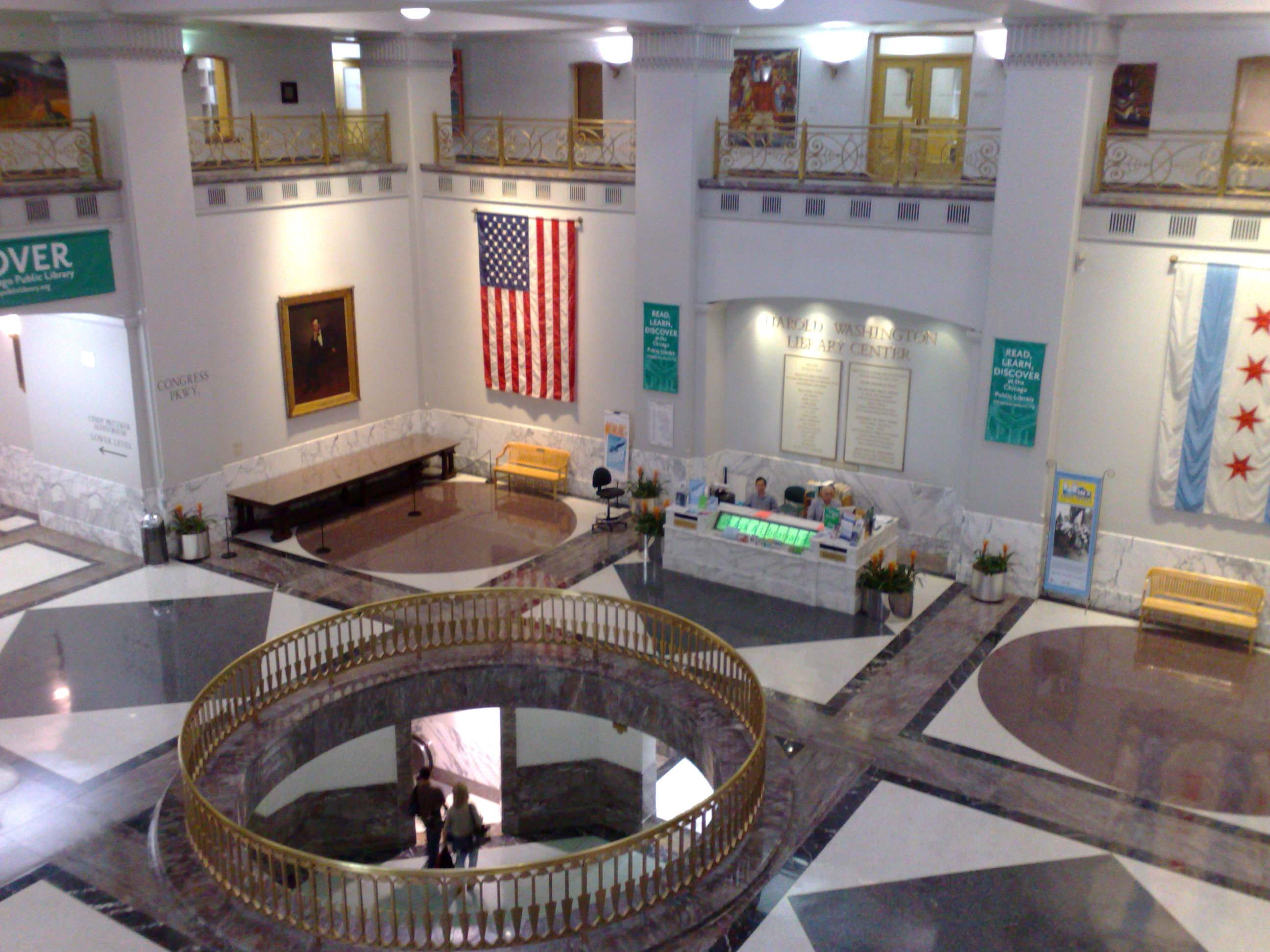
Lobby

All public doors lead to the lobby. The north public entrance on Van Buren is just east of the CTA's Harold Washington Library–State/Van Buren station, served by the Brown, Orange, Pink and Purple Lines. The corridor goes east, then south, then west, and opens south to the lobby.

The east and south public entrances open directly to the lobby. The west public entrance opens to the offices. The west corridor goes east then south to open at the lobby.

- The lower level houses the Cindy Pritzker Auditorium, Multi-Purpose Room and Exhibit Hall.
- The central lobby is two stories tall and includes both the circulation and information desks. On the east side, the Popular Library is housed and on the West side there is a YouMedia space for teens.
- The second floor houses the Thomas Hughes Children’s library.
- The third floor includes computers for public use, periodicals, and interlibrary loan and general information services departments along with a library makerspace. The Maker Lab includes multiple 3D printers, CNC machines and Laser Cutters. Use of these machines is available for a nominal fee.
- The fourth floor holds the business, general sciences, and technology items.
- The fifth floor holds government publications, Chicago municipal references, maps, and an assistive resources and talking book center for the blind, visually impaired and physically disabled.
- The sixth floor holds social sciences and history resources.
- The seventh floor holds literature and language resources as well as a work by acclaimed Polish sculptor Jerzy Kenar.
- The eighth floor holds visual and performing arts resources, music practice rooms, and audio/visual rooms.
- The ninth floor holds the Winter Garden, which may serve as a reading room or be rented for social functions. Also on this floor are exhibit halls, Special Collections, and the Harold Washington Archives and Collections.
- The tenth floor is not open to the public. It houses library offices and technical services.

== See also ==
- Chicago architecture
- Events in the Life of Harold Washington (mural)
- List of museums and cultural institutions in Chicago
- Harold Washington Library–State/Van Buren station
