= Bennett Stewart =

American politician (1912–1988)

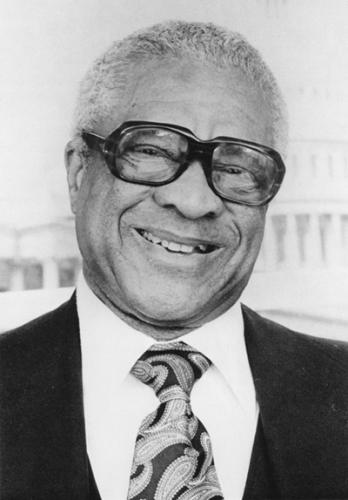
- congressional portrait, circa 1979

Member of the U.S. House of Representatives from Illinois's 1st district
- In office January 3, 1979 – January 3, 1981
- Preceded by: Ralph Metcalfe
- Succeeded by: Harold Washington

Chicago Alderman from the 21st Ward
- In office 1971–1979
- Preceded by: Wilson Frost
- Succeeded by: Niles Sherman

Personal details
- Born: August 6, 1912 Huntsville, Alabama, U.S.
- Died: April 26, 1988 (aged 75) Chicago, Illinois, U.S.
- Party: Democratic
- Spouse: Pattye Crittenden (m. 1938)
- Children: 2
- Education: Miles College

Bennett McVey Stewart (August 6, 1912 – April 26, 1988) was an American politician who as a part of the Democratic party served as a U.S. representative from Illinois (1979–1981) and as a member of the Chicago City Council (1971–1979).

== Early life and education ==
Stewart was born in Huntsville, Alabama, to Bennett Stewart Sr. and Cathleen Jones. Stewart was baptized at Meridianville P.B. Church. Stewart attended the public schools in Huntsville and Birmingham. Stewart received a B.A. from Miles College in Birmingham in 1936. Stewart was a member of Alpha Phi Alpha fraternity.

== Professional career ==
After graduating college, Stewart worked as the assistant principal of Irondale High School in 1936. Two years after becoming assistant principal of Irondale, Stewart became an associate professor of sociology at Miles College in 1938. Stewart worked as an insurance executive in 1940, and as the Illinois director for Atlanta Life Insurance Co. in 1950. Stewart and his family relocated to Chicago, Illinois in 1951 due to the insurance company Chicago branch opening. After seventeen years with Atlanta Life Insurance Co., Stewart began work as an inspector of the Chicago Building Department in 1968. Stewart was a rehabilitation specialist for the Chicago Department of Urban Renewal in 1968.

== Chicago City Council (1971–1979) ==
In 1971, Stewart was elected to the Chicago City Council, unseating Wilson Frost in the 21st ward. The following year, Stewart was elected to also serve as the ward's Democratic committeeman. He was re-elected as alderman in 1975 and as the ward's committeeman in 1976.

Stewart was a delegate to the several Illinois State Democratic conventions held between 1971 and 1978. He was also delegate to the Democratic National Conventions in 1972 and 1976.

== U.S. Congress (1979–1981) ==
Stewart was elected as a Democrat to the 96th Congress. He failed in his bid for renomination in 1980, losing the Democratic primary to Harold Washington, who went on to win the general election.

== Later career, and death ==
Stewart then served as administrative assistant to Mayor Jane Byrne in Chicago from 1981 to 1983.

Stewart died on April 26, 1988, aged 75 at University of Chicago Hospital. Stewart funeral services was held at St. Paul Christian Methodist Episcopal Church in Chicago on April 30, 1988. At the time of his death, Stewart was survived by his wife since 1938, Pattye Crittenden. Together Stewart and Crittenden had two sons, Bennett Jr., and Ronald, a daughter, Miriam Stewart Early.

== Electoral history ==
Illinois's 1st congressional district general election, 1978
Party	Candidate	Votes	%
Democratic	Bennett M. Stewart	47,581	58.54
Republican	A. A. Rayner Jr.	33,540	41.27
Write-in		158	0.19
Total votes		81,279	100.0

Illinois's 1st congressional district Democratic primary, 1980
Party	Candidate	Votes	%
Democratic	Harold Washington	30,522	47.70
Democratic	Ralph H. Metcalfe, Jr.	12,356	19.31
Democratic	Bennett M. Stewart (incumbent)	10,810	16.90
Democratic	John H. Stroger, Jr.	10,284	16.07
Write-in		11	0.02
Total votes		63,983	100.0

== See also ==
- List of African-American United States representatives

U.S. House of Representatives
Preceded by Ralph Metcalfe	Member of the U.S. House of Representatives from Illinois's 1st congressional district 1979–1981	Succeeded by Harold Washington
