= Nu Beta Epsilon =

Defunct American legal fraternity

- ΝΒΕ
- Founded: 1919; 107 years ago Northwestern University Law School
- Type: Professional
- Affiliation: Independent
- Status: Defunct
- Defunct date: After 1969
- Emphasis: Law, Jewish
- Scope: National
- Motto: Nomus Carcilia Esta "Law is king"
- Publication: The Nu Bate
- Chapters: 23
- Members: 1,750 (as of 1963) lifetime
- Headquarters: United States

Nu Beta Epsilon (ΝΒΕ) was an American professional Jewish law fraternity.

== History ==
Nu Beta Epsilon was formed in 1919 at Northwestern University School of Law by Barnet Hodes, with the assistance of Louis Brandeis and Dean Wigmore, as a Greek letter fraternity for Jewish students at accredited law schools. It expanded to other law schools across the United States. It also established an alumni association.

Alpha Kappa Sigma (ΑΚΣ) was a Jewish law fraternity founded by H. Edwin Siff at University of Maryland Law School in 1918. Representatives of the two fraternities met at a convention in Columbus, Ohio in 1939 with Hodes as the keynote speaker. The merger of the two fraternities went into effect in 1940 under the name of the Nu Beta Epsilon group. A. D. G. Cohn of Atlanta was elected as its vice grand chancellor.

Nu Beta Epsilon's quarterly newsletter was The Nu Bete. The fraternity presented three awards each year:

- Barnet Hodes Awards to an alumnus performing outstanding service to the fraternity on a national level
- Ben Rubin Endowment to an undergraduate for scholarship, with the trophy going to his chapter
- National Pledge Essay Award for the best legal essay written by a pledge

== Symbols ==
Nu Beta Epsilon adopted the seal and motto of the former Nu Beta Epsilon fraternity. Its motto was Nomus Carcilia Esta, meaning "Law is king". Its seal or crest included symbols associated with the legal professional.

== Governance ==
The Ground Council of the fraternity's annual national convention governed Nu Beta Epsilon.

== Membership ==
Nu Beta Epsilon was founded as non-sectarian, with no racial membership limitations. Originally male only, its membership became open to women c. 1960. In 1945, it had 850 members. Its membership had grown to 1,750 in 1968.

== Chapter List ==
The chapters of Nu Beta Epsilon were as follows. Active chapters are indicated in bold. Inactive chapters and institutions are in italics.

Chapter	Charter date and range	Institution	Location	Status	Ref.
Alpha	1918	University of Maryland Law School	Baltimore City, Maryland	Inactive	
Brandeis	1919–c. 1935	Northwestern University Law School	Chicago, Illinois	Inactive	(Note: Chapter named for Louis Brandeis.)
Delta	1919–c. 1965	Temple University Law School	Philadelphia, Pennsylvania	Inactive	
Epsilon	1919–c. 1963	Newark Law School	Newark, New Jersey	Inactive	
Cardozo	1923	DePaul University College of Law	Chicago, Illinois	Inactive	
Benjamin	1924	Chicago-Kent College of Law	Chicago, Illinois	Inactive	(Note: Chapter named for Judah P. Benjamin.)
Marshall	1926	Washington University School of Law	St. Louis, Missouri	Inactive	
Chicago	1929–c. 1963	University of Chicago Law School	Chicago, Illinois	Inactive	
Horner	1921	University of Illinois Law School	Champaign, Illinois.	Inactive	
Beta Gamma	1931	George Washington University Law School and Georgetown University Law School	Washington, D.C.	Inactive	
Loyola	1932–c. 1963	Loyola University Chicago School of Law	Chicago, Illinois	Inactive	
Zeta	1933	Atlanta Law School, Emory University Law School, Atlanta's John Marshall Law School	Atlanta, Georgia	Inactive	
Coleman	1941	University of Southern California Law School	Los Angeles, California	Inactive	
Theta	1946	University of Miami School of Law	Coral Gables, Florida	Inactive	
Currie	1950	UCLA School of Law	Los Angeles, California	Inactive	
Warren	September 1966	University of San Fernando College of Law	San Fernando, California	Inactive	(Note: Chapter named for Earl Warren.) (Note: The San Fernando Valley College of Law merged into the University of West Los Angeles in 2002.)
Gamma Gamma Lambda	September 1967	California College of Law	Hollywood, California	Inactive	
Traynor		Western State University College of Law	Orange County, California	Inactive	(Note: Chapter named for Roger J. Traynor.)
Holmes	February 1, 1969	University of West Los Angeles School of Law	Los Angeles, California	Inactive	(Note: Chapter named for Oliver Wendell Holmes Jr.)
	September 1969	John F. Kennedy University	Pleasant Hill, California	Inactive	
Baker		Humphrey College	Stockton, California	Inactive	(Note: Chapter is named for Joseph H. Baker, district attorney.)
Dooley		Glendale University College of Law	Glendale, California	Inactive	(Note: In 1927, the chapter was renamed in honor of Raymond G. Dooley, a former faculty member.)
Sebring		Stetson University College of Law	Gulfport, Florida	Inactive	(Note: Chapter named for Harold Sebring.)

== Notable members ==
Name	Chapter and year	Notability	Ref.
Ellis Arnall	Honorary, 1946	Governor of Georgia	
Bernard Baruch	Honorary, 1946	Financier and statesman	
Louis Brandeis	Brandeis, 1919	Associate Justice of the Supreme Court of the United States	
Raymond Burr		actor	
Benjamin N. Cardozo		Associate Justice of the Supreme Court of the United States	
Joseph E. Davies		United States Ambassador to the Soviet Union	
Paul A. Dorf		State senator and judge	
Phillip C. Goldstick		Member of Illinois General Assembly	
Barnet Hodes	Brandeis, 1919	Counsel of the City of Chicago	
Sam Massell	Alpha, 1936	Mayor of Atlanta	
Eurith D. Rivers	Zeta Honorary 1941	Governor of Georgia	
John M. Slaton	Zeta Honorary 1941	Governor of Georgia	
Harold Washington		Mayor of Chicago and U.S. House of Representatives	
Wendel Wilkie		lawyer, corporate executive, and nominee for President of the United States.	
Bernard B. Wolfe		Member of Illinois General Assembly	
