= Joe Kotlarz =

American lawyer and politician

Joseph S. Kotlarz, Jr. (born October 29, 1956) was an American lawyer and politician.

Born in Chicago, Illinois, Kotlarz received his bachelor's degree from DePaul University and his J.D. degree from John Marshall Law School. He practiced law. In 1983, Kotlarz was elected to the Chicago City Council and was involved with the Democratic Party. From 1993 to 1997, Kotlarz served in the Illinois House of Representatives.

In 1997, Kotlarz resigned from the Illinois General Assembly after being convicted for theft and conspiracy in a real estate scam involving the Illinois Toll Highway Authority.
