= Prevention First =

U.S. non-profit organization

Prevention First is a nonprofit resource center based in Springfield, Illinois, committed to building and supporting healthy, drug-free communities through public education, professional training and effective tools for those working to prevent drug use and related issues such as violence, teen pregnancy and academic failure.

As the Illinois alliance partner for the Partnership for a Drug-Free America, Prevention First has won several national awards for its efforts to educate and inform parents, teens and others about how to prevent youth drug use.

Prevention First is the only resource center of its kind in Illinois. Its services include a Student Assistance Center that provides training and support services to schools, particularly in relation to Student Assistance Programs designed to identify those at risk of school failure and intervene to help them succeed. Its Chicago branch office houses an extensive prevention-focused specialized library, while a free Clearinghouse in Springfield distributes nearly 1 million brochures, posters and other materials to schools, youth groups, community organizations, law enforcement agencies and others each year.
