= Peggy Smith Martin =

American politician

Peggy Smith Martin (May 22, 1931 – August 24, 2012) was an American politician in Illinois.

Peggy Annette Morris was born in Corinth, Mississippi. She moved with her family to Paducah, Kentucky, Detroit, Michigan, and finally to Chicago, Illinois. Martin went to Chicago Commercial College, University of Chicago, and to Kennedy–King College. She received her bachelor's degree in correctional and criminal justice from Governors State University. Martin was involved with the Democratic Party, She served in the Illinois House of Representatives from 1973 to 1975 and from 1977 to 1979.
