= James C. Taylor =

American politician

James C. Taylor (February 8, 1930 – March 18, 1999) was an American politician. He served in the Illinois House of representatives and then the Illinois Senate.

Taylor was born in Crawfordsville, Arkansas, and grew up in Chicago, Illinois. Taylor was African-American. He went to University of Illinois and Monticello College. He served in the United States Army during the Korean War. Taylor worked in the Chicago Department of Sanitation and was a supervisor for the Stevenson Expressway.

Taylor served in the Illinois Senate from 1981 to 1983. He also served in the Illinois House of Representatives from 1969 to 1981 and from 1983 to 1985 and was a Democrat. Taylor died from a heart attack at the Ingalls Hospital in Harvey, Illinois.
