= Richard Mell =

American politician

2nd Vice Mayor of Chicago
- In office April 16, 1979 – April 24, 1987
- Mayor: Jane Byrne; Harold Washington
- Preceded by: Casey Laskowski
- Succeeded by: David Orr

Member of the Chicago City Council from the 33rd ward
- In office 1975 – July 24, 2013
- Preceded by: John Brandt
- Succeeded by: Deb Mell

Personal details
- Born: May 5, 1938 (age 87) Muskegon, Michigan, U.S.
- Party: Democratic
- Spouse: Marge Mell
- Children: 3, including Deb and Patricia
- Relatives: Rod Blagojevich (son-in-law)

Richard F. "Dick" Mell (born May 5, 1938) is an American politician. A Democrat, he served on the Chicago City Council from 1975 to 2013. He retired in 2013 and was succeeded by Deb Mell, his daughter.

== Early life ==
Mell was born and raised in Muskegon, Michigan, where he attended high school and college.

== Career ==
After college, he settled in Chicago with his wife Marge and opened a spring manufacturing business. He also became active in local politics. In 1972, Mell was an unsuccessful candidate for 33rd Ward Democratic Committeeman, losing by about 500 votes. In 1975, he was elected Alderman of the 33rd Ward of the City of Chicago. In 1976, he was also elected ward committeeman. His ward comprised part of Chicago's Northwest Side.

In 1979, Mell was elected by the City Council to serve as the city's vice mayor. He held this position until April 1987.

During the Council Wars of the mid-1980s, Mell was allied with the Vrdolyak 29 who opposed then-Mayor Harold Washington. After the Vrdolyak 29 lost their majority in the city council in the 1986 court-ordered aldermanic elections, Mell offered to cooperate with Washington. Upon Washington's death in 1987, Mell famously stood on his desk in the City Council chambers, demanding to be recognized as the divided council wrestled with the question of who would succeed Washington.

In a 1982 handgun ban ordinance that Mell had himself authored, new pistol registrations had been prohibited with existing handgun registrations prior to 1982 allowed to renew. All new registration attempts since 1982 were disallowed. However, in 2007, Mell failed to re-register his extensive firearms collection (which included handguns) as then required by city ordinance. As a result, Mell, along with Chicago Mayor Richard M. Daley, proposed a one-month amnesty, where the gun registry would be re-opened. Mell claimed that thousands of Chicagoans were in his situation and would benefit, but just 25 people (including Mell) successfully registered guns during the "amnesty." Chicago's handgun ban was struck down in 2011 by the United States Supreme Court in McDonald v. City of Chicago.

In December 2008, Mayor Richard M. Daley gave the city council three days to consider the complicated and lengthy contract to privatize the city's parking meters for 75 years. The city council ultimately approved the deal by a vote of 40 to 5.

On July 3, 2013, Mell submitted his letter of resignation, effective July 24, 2013. Mayor Rahm Emanuel appointed Mell's daughter Deb as Mell's successor as alderman from the 33rd ward.

== Personal life ==
Dick and Marge Mell have three children: Patricia, Deborah, and Richard. His daughter Patricia is married to former Illinois Governor Rod Blagojevich. His daughter Deb was elected to the state house of representatives in 2008 and appointed to the Chicago City Council in 2013. Marge Mell died December 3, 2006, of progressive supranuclear palsy, a rare and fatal disease.
