= Susan Catania =

American politician (1941–2023)

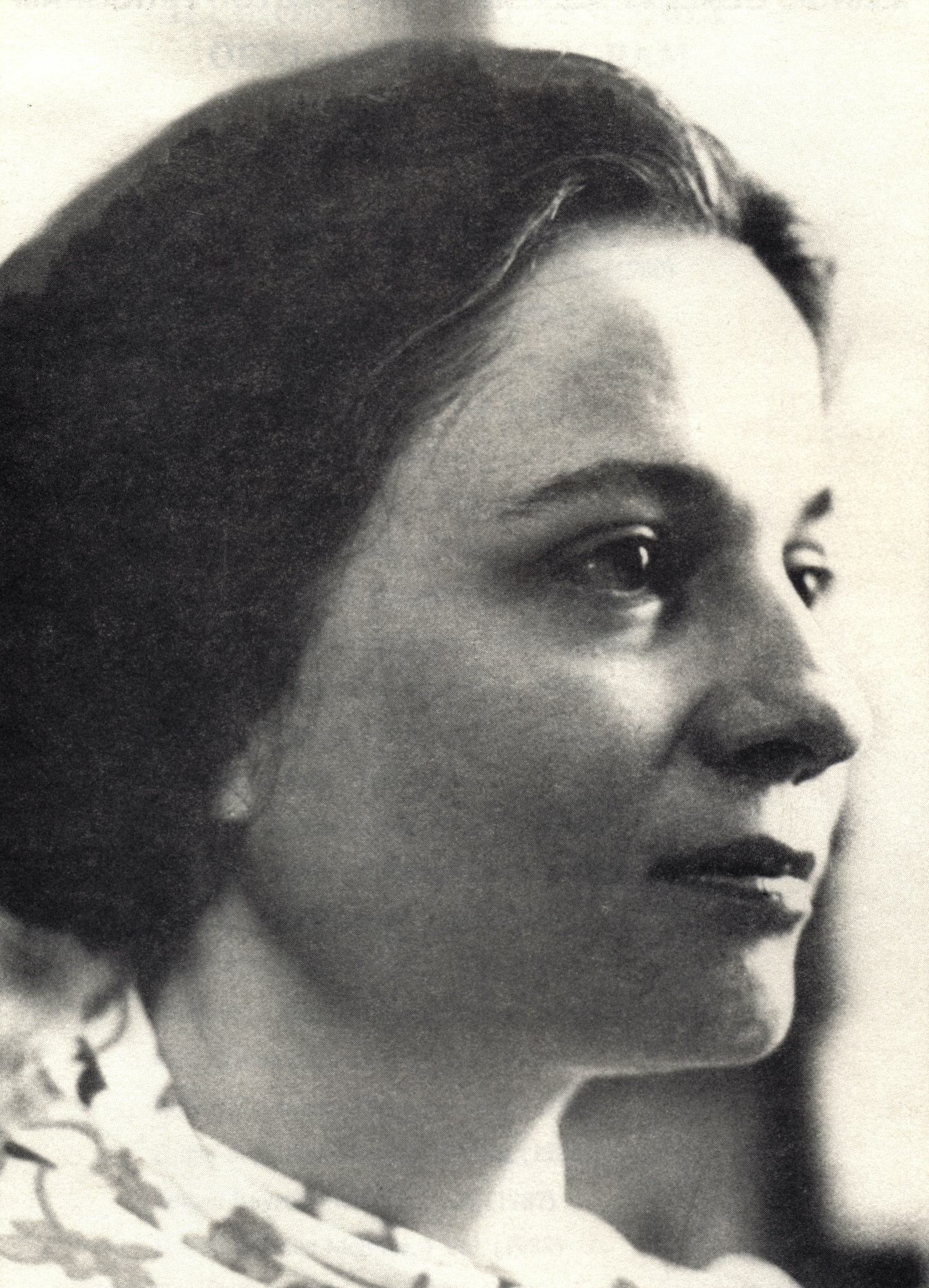
- Catania in 1976

Member of the Illinois House of Representatives from the 22nd district
- In office 1973–1983
- Preceded by: Genoa Washington (Republican representative of multi-member district)
- Succeeded by: Redistricted

Personal details
- Born: Susan Kmetty; December 10, 1941 Chicago, Illinois, U.S.
- Died: November 27, 2023 (aged 81) Eagle River, Wisconsin, U.S.
- Party: Republican
- Spouse: Anthony E. Catania (m. 1963; died 2022)
- Children: 7
- Education: Saint Xavier University (BA); Northwestern University; University of Chicago (MSW)

Susan Catania (née Kmetty; December 10, 1941 – November 27, 2023) was an American politician who served as a Republican member of the Illinois House of Representatives from 1973 to 1983. She was involved in women's rights issues, and she led the unsuccessful effort to get the federal Equal Rights Amendment (ERA) ratified by the Illinois General Assembly. Catania also served as chairperson of the Illinois Commission on the Status of Women. A representative from Chicago, she was described as a liberal, feminist, and maverick member of the Republican legislative caucus.

Catania represented a heavily African American and Democratic district, but a Republican could still represent the district under the state's cumulative voting system. In the House, Catania introduced gay rights bills and the Freedom of Information Act, but both efforts were unsuccessful. During her tenure, she sponsored over 50 bills that became law, including the Crime Victim Compensation Act and a bill that designated Martin Luther King Jr. Day as a state holiday, both of which were enacted in 1973. Cumulative voting was abolished by the Cutback Amendment in 1981, and Catania lost any chance to retain her seat in the House going forward. During the 1982 elections, she ran for lieutenant governor, but lost the Republican primary, which was seen as a referendum on ratification of the ERA.

== Early years and personal life ==
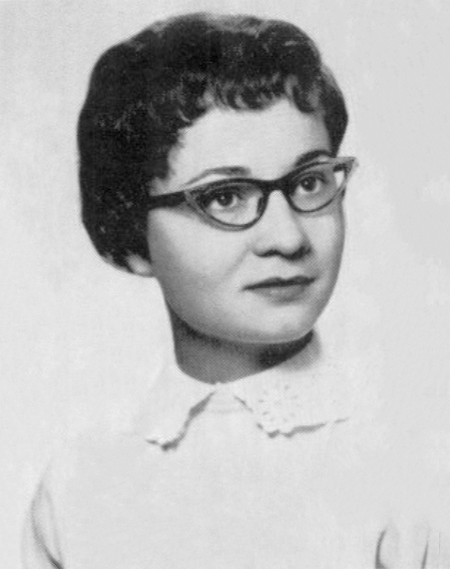
Susan Kmetty (later Catania) in 1958

Born in Chicago on December 10, 1941, Susan Kmetty grew up in the Beverly neighborhood in the city's South Side. She was an only child. Her father, John Kmetty, made supplies for heavy industrial equipment, and her mother, Helen Giffrow Kmetty, taught home economics at Chicago Public Schools. Susan attended Catholic schools, including Mother McAuley High School. In 1962, she received a Bachelor of Arts degree in chemistry from Saint Xavier University. She later did one year of graduate studies in chemistry, including work as a teaching assistant, at Northwestern University.

In 1963 Kmetty married Anthony E. Catania, whom she had met during an intercollegiate glee club event. They had seven daughters, three of whom were born during Susan's tenure as a state representative. They were married for 58 years before Anthony died in 2022.

Catania's education, and the fact that both of her parents worked, motivated her to work full-time in an era when many men assumed women were to stay at home. In 1963, she joined Walter C. McCrone Associates, a microscopy consulting firm in the South Side, as information director, technical writer, and publicist. She hired a babysitter and lived near her workplace, allowing her to nurse her baby during her break. By the end of 1970, Catania quit that job after she did not receive a promotion she had expected. The following year, she filed a sex discrimination lawsuit after her employer allegedly hired a man with less experience but offered him twice the pay. Her claim to the US Equal Employment Opportunity Commission was the first by an Illinois woman for unemployment benefits based on sex discrimination, and included a claim for being denied dependent benefits for her children. Catania connected with the National Organization for Women, which was recruiting women to testify at the General Assembly for a bill expanding access to unemployment benefits for pregnant women. Catania would become one of the women to testify with the organization. By 1972, she worked freelance as a technical publications consultant.

== Campaign for the House ==
Amid her advocacy for legislation protecting pregnant women, in 1972 Catania decided to campaign for a seat in the Illinois House of Representatives, representing the 22nd district. She was vying for the Republican seat in her district that was available under the state's cumulative voting system, in which each district elected three members. Her district was predominantly African American and Democratic.

Three other candidates ran for the Republican nomination, including incumbent Genoa Washington. The Chicago Tribune reported that Catania was running "one of the most vigorous campaigns of the year", in contrast to the other candidates. Washington was confident of his reelection and led a relatively quiet campaign. Catania ran on a platform to mitigate pollution, promote consumer protection, improve public education, promote small business, regulate insurance practices in the inner city, and combat racial and sex discrimination. Washington battled cancer and died a few weeks before the election, leaving his seat vacant. Catania won the election, having secured endorsements from Independent Voters of Illinois and Gloria Steinem, an activist and journalist.

== Tenure ==
Catania has been described as a liberal, feminist, and maverick. She often defied her party's leadership, supporting gun control and abortion, but faced few repercussions as there is no Republican organization in the South Side of Chicago. Throughout her tenure, she sponsored over 50 bills that became law, addressing topics that included domestic violence, child support, joint custody, school bus safety, grandparents' visitation rights, state income tax reform, a rape shield law, and public aid.

=== Women's rights ===
Catania joined a small group of women legislators who focused on women's rights issues in the 1970s. Judy Koehler, a colleague in the House, regarded Catania as "very much a leader on women’s issues, on such things as domestic violence, sexual abuse and employment discrimination". In 1974, she shocked male legislators by bringing her infant daughter to the House floor and nursing her baby in the women's restroom. The infant remained in a car bed under an empty desk near Catania's, and recent renovations had added a new women's lounge by the entrance into the House chamber, the lounge equipped with a loudspeaker to keep its occupants informed of House proceedings. In 1975, Catania was appointed chairperson of the Illinois Commission on the Status of Women, a 16-member panel including both Democratic and Republican appointees.

Catania credited disposable diapers with helping her care for her babies while traveling for legislative business. Catania supported the federal Displaced Homemakers Act, which addressed women seeking to enter or re-enter the workforce. She testified at hearings of a US House subcommittee in 1976, and a US Senate subcommittee in 1977. Catania was chief sponsor of the unsuccessful effort to get the federal Equal Rights Amendment (ERA) ratified by the General Assembly, (Note: The General Assembly eventually ratified the ERA in 2018, more than three decades after the federal deadline.) breaking with Speaker George Ryan, who opposed the ERA. Ryan later declined to reappoint her to the Commission on the Status of Women. Her term as the commission's chairperson had lasted for eight years.

In 1979, Catania proposed an amendment to the Illinois Human Rights Act, which had passed the Senate with the sponsorship of Harold Washington. Catania's amendment, which would have allowed women guarantees in the use of credit cards, passed the House but was not accepted by the Senate. As Catania refused to back down, the bill deadlocked, and the General Assembly adjourned at the end of June. After additional negotiations, the act was re-introduced in November without Catania's amendment, and the bill became law in December. That same year, she won an award named after Susan B. Anthony for her legislative leadership on women's issues.

=== Other issues ===
In January 1973, Catania introduced a bill that designated Martin Luther King Jr. Day as a state holiday. She was joined as sponsors by Harold Washington (a state representative at the time) and Peggy Smith Martin, and the bill was signed in September of the same year by Governor Dan Walker. Catania introduced gay rights bills as early as 1976, partnering with legislators Robert E. Mann and Leland H. Rayson. Activist Rick Garcia credited her for "open[ing] the door for other moderate Republicans to start to begin supporting basic civil rights for LGBTQ+ people". Catania and Elroy Sundquist, a fellow Republican in the House, also sponsored bills to prohibit discrimination based on sexual orientation. However, in 1977 the legislation was overwhelmingly defeated, with a vote of 38–114. In 1974, Catania was the first to sponsor the Freedom of Information Act. Chicago-based Democrats in the General Assembly often opposed freedom of information initiatives in the mid-1970s, referring the matters back to legislative committees to avoid consideration. She also sponsored the Crime Victim Compensation Act, which passed in 1973. Catania secured emergency state funding for Cook County Hospital and Provident Hospital, the latter effort which was co-sponsored with Harold Washington. She also sponsored gun control legislation, but those efforts failed.

Catania encouraged voters to support Republican Charles H. Percy for election as U.S. Senator from Illinois. She also encouraged constituents to protest against Edward Hanrahan, the Democratic state's attorney for Cook County, for his controversial role in the killing of Black Panthers Fred Hampton and Mark Clark. In 1980, Catania supported John B. Anderson during the Republican Party presidential primaries. Shortly after the 1980 presidential election, she criticized Ronald Reagan's military defense policies in an interview published by the Catholic progressive organization Call to Action.

== Post-House political career ==
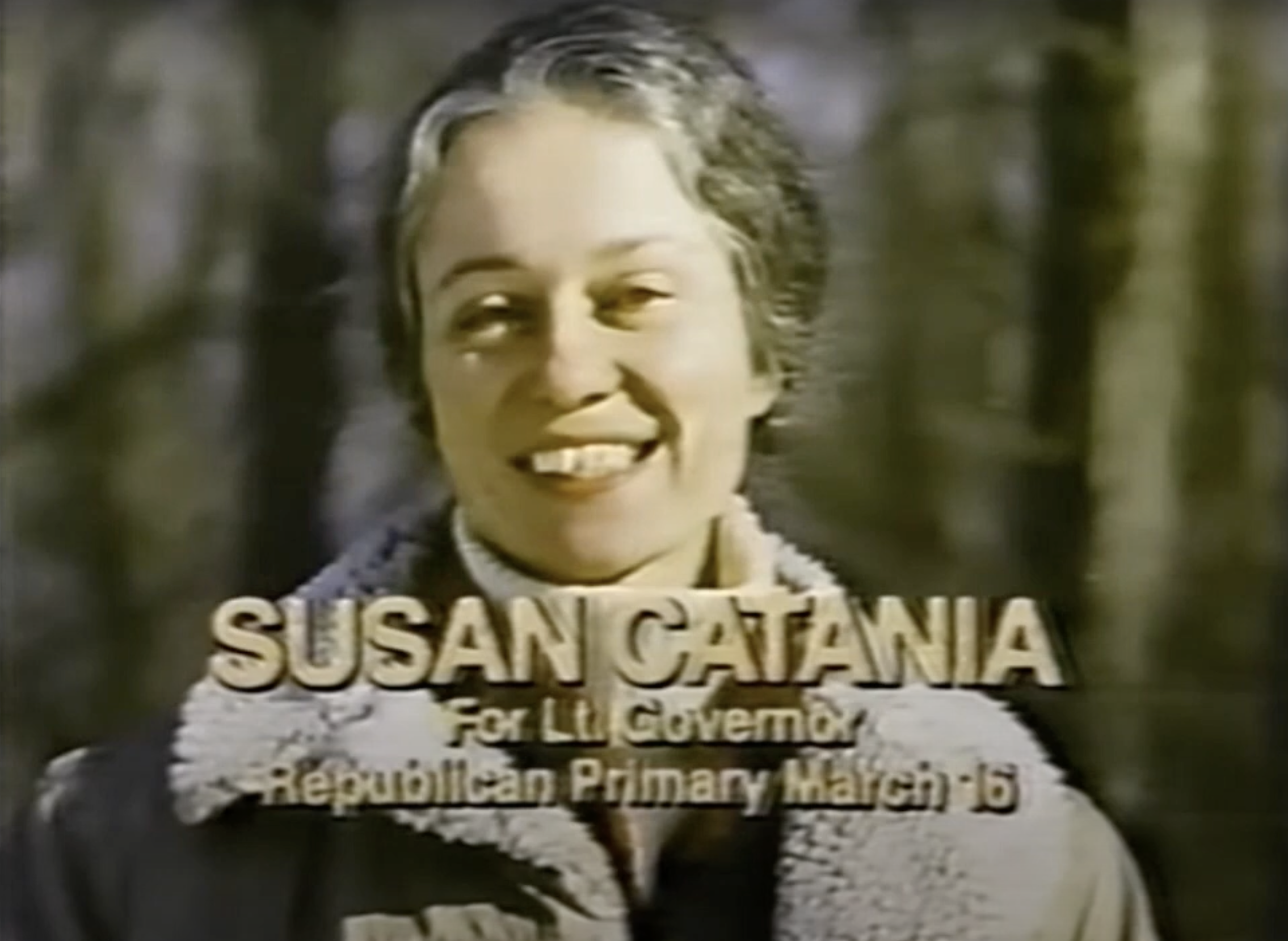
Advertisement for Catania's lieutenant governor campaign in 1982

Cumulative voting was abolished by the Cutback Amendment in 1981, and Catania lost any chance to retain her seat in the House going forward. She ran for the Republican nomination for lieutenant governor in 1982. It was also a form of retaliation against George Ryan, who had opposed her reappointment to the Commission on the Status of Women and was also running for lieutenant governor. As the only candidate to openly support the ERA, Catania collected donations from feminists nationwide who were hoping to get Illinois to ratify the amendment. At the time, Illinois was the only northern industrial state that had not ratified, and national ERA leaders viewed the election as a potential referendum on the amendment. The National Organization for Women supported Catania, while Phyllis Schlafly, an ERA opponent, recognized the importance of the race and opposed her. Governor James R. Thompson backed Ryan in the race, and mainstream Republicans in Illinois regarded Catania "as radical as Leon Trotsky". Catania lost the primary, coming in second place to Ryan. Afterwards, she continued lobbying on women's rights issues.

Starting in December 1982, Catania was a member of the women's committee of the Chicago 1992 World's Fair. She also served on the advisory committee, formed in July 1983, of Harold Washington, who by then had been elected mayor of Chicago. In spring 1983, Catania was a fellow at the Harvard Institute of Politics for six months, studying women in politics. Her activities included giving lectures, leading seminars, and rowing along the Charles River as part of a rowing crew team. On June 7, 1984, she testified before the US Senate Committee on Foreign Relations during a hearing regarding the role of women in the economic development of the Third World. During the 1984 Republican National Convention, Catania gained national attention as the only delegate who refused to support the Reagan–Bush slate. In 1986, she ran in the at-large election to be a member of the Cook County Board of Commissioners representing Chicago, succeeding in the primary to be one of ten Republican nominees, but losing the general election. During Chicago's mayoral election in 1987, she was mentioned as a potential candidate for the Republican primary, though she ultimately opted not to run.

By 1992, Catania ran her consulting firm. She helped open a daycare center for state employees in Chicago. During the 1992 elections in Cook County, she was the Republican nominee for recorder of deeds, losing the election to Democratic nominee Jesse White.

== Later life ==
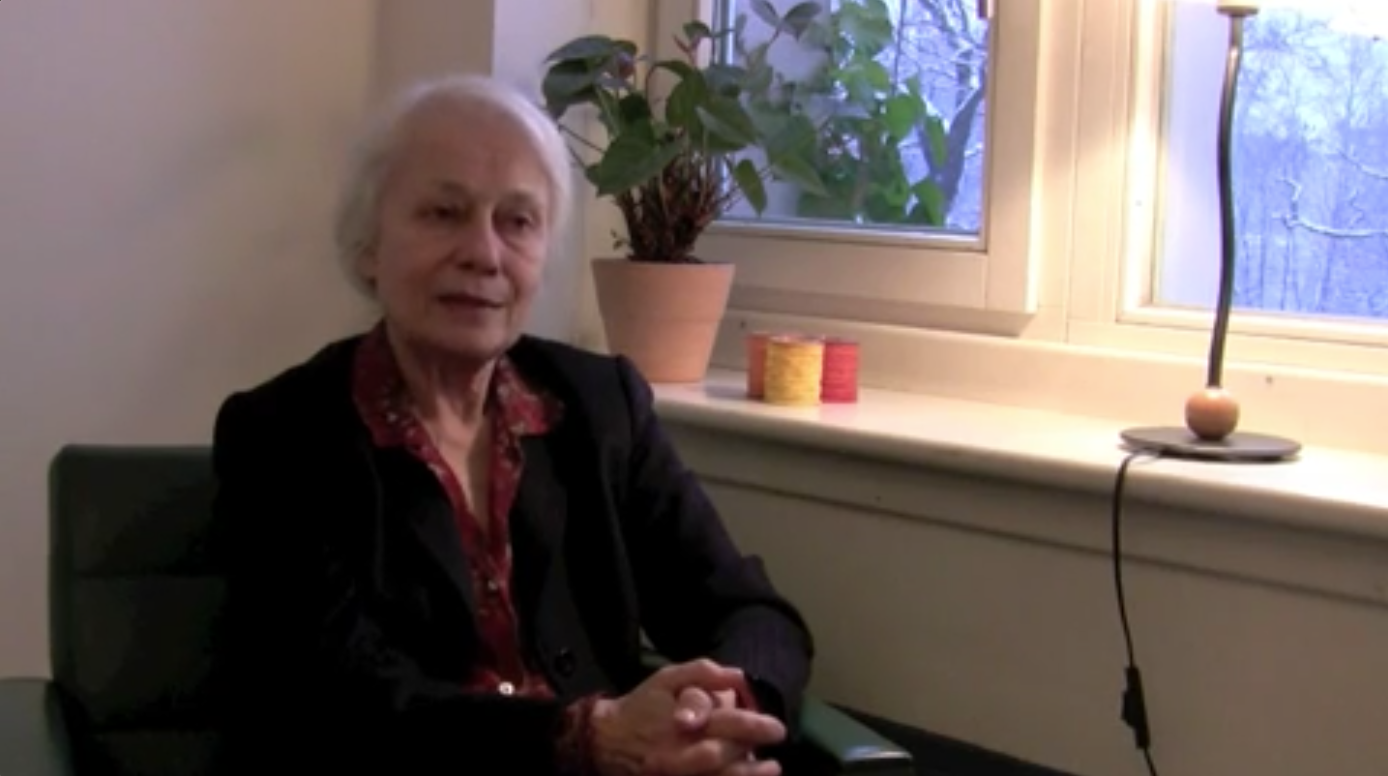
Catania in 2010

In 1993, Governor Jim Edgar assigned Catania to the Department of Children and Family Services, where she was responsible for establishing and licensing foster-care homes in Cook County. In 1997, Catania earned a Master of Social Work degree at the University of Chicago. By 1998, she worked for the Department of Human Services, overseeing the state's program for preventing and responding to sexual assault. She worked for that department until her retirement.

Catania survived bouts of breast cancer and bone cancer. In 2016, she supported Democratic nominee Tammy Duckworth for the United States Senate election in Illinois, and also Democratic nominee Hillary Clinton for the presidential election. She eventually moved to Buffalo Grove, Illinois, then to Eagle River, Wisconsin, for permanent retirement. (Note: One source suggests that Catania was living in Buffalo Grove as late as 2018, but another source indicates that she moved into Eagle River as early as 2016.) In Eagle River, Catania lived in a family cabin at Cranberry Lake that had been purchased by her parents when she was young, and where her children would spend their summers. Catania died from injuries during a fire at the cabin on November 27, 2023, at age 81.

== Electoral history ==
=== Illinois House of Representatives elections ===
1972 primary election—Illinois House of Representatives, 22nd District
Party	Candidate	Votes	%
Republican	Genoa S. Washington	1,632	49.64
Republican	Susan Catania	1,275	38.78
Republican	George Williams	266 1/2	8.11
Republican	M. Earle Sardon	114 1/2	3.48
Total votes		3,288	100

1972 general election—Illinois House of Representatives, 22nd District
Party	Candidate	Votes	%
Democratic	Corneal A. Davis	55,911 1/2	42.18
Democratic	James A. McLendon	47,021	35.48
Republican	Susan Catania	20,260 1/2	15.29
Republican	William O. Stewart	9,347	7.05
Total votes		619,133	100

1974 primary election—Illinois House of Representatives, 22nd District
Party	Candidate	Votes	%
Republican	Susan Catania	1,748 1/2	64.68
Republican	Brenda E. Perry	955	35.32
Total votes		2,703 1/2	100

1974 general election—Illinois House of Representatives, 22nd District
Party	Candidate	Votes	%
Democratic	Corneal A. Davis	32,396	39.73
Democratic	James A. McLendon	31,874	39.09
Republican	Susan Catania	13,377	16.41
Republican	Brenda E. Perry	3,893 1/2	4.77
Total votes		81,540 1/2	100

1976 primary election—Illinois House of Representatives, 22nd District
Party	Candidate	Votes	%
Republican	Susan Catania	1,484	73.00
Republican	Willie Reed	549	27.00
Total votes		2,033	100

1976 general election—Illinois House of Representatives, 22nd District
Party	Candidate	Votes	%
Democratic	Corneal A. Davis	51,456	43.25
Democratic	James A. McLendon	44,197 1/2	37.15
Republican	Susan Catania	18,368 1/2	15.44
Republican	Willie Reed	4,951	4.16
Total votes		118,973	100

1978 primary election—Illinois House of Representatives, 22nd District
Party	Candidate	Votes	%
Republican	Susan Catania	1,314 1/2	70.54
Republican	Willie Reed	331 1/2	17.79
Republican	Alma King	217 1/2	11.67
Total votes		1,863 1/2	100

1978 general election—Illinois House of Representatives, 22nd District
Party	Candidate	Votes	%
Democratic	Larry S. Bullock	30,623 1/2	40.10
Democratic	Quentin J. Goodwin	26,277 1/2	34.41
Republican	Susan Catania	15,388 1/2	20.15
Republican	Willie Reed	4,086 1/2	5.35
Total votes		76,376	100

1980 primary election—Illinois House of Representatives, 22nd District
Party	Candidate	Votes	%
Republican	Susan Catania	2,325	98.48
Republican	W. Frazier (Write-in)	27	1.14
Republican	Write-ins	9	0.38
Total votes		2,361	100

1980 general election—Illinois House of Representatives, 22nd District
Party	Candidate	Votes	%
Democratic	Larry S. Bullock	43,939	36.19
Democratic	Margaret Smith	41,347 1/2	34.06
Republican	Susan Catania	17,460 1/2	14.38
Good-Win	Quentin J. Goodwin	11,611	9.56
Republican	Wynetta A. Frazier	4,322	3.56
Independent	"Big James" Phipps	2,090	1.72
Independent	James "Skip" Burrell	627 1/2	0.52
Total votes		121,397 1/2	100

=== Later elections ===
1982 Republican primary—Illinois Lieutenant Governor
Party	Candidate	Votes	%
Republican	George Ryan	278,544	44.99
Republican	Susan Catania	188,220	30.40
Republican	Donald L. Totten	152,356	24.61
Write-in	Others	13	0.00
Total votes		619,133	100

1986 Republican primary—Cook County Board of Commissioners, Chicago seats
Party	Candidate	Votes	%
Republican	Susan Catania	13,501	9.85
Republican	Richard D. Murphy	13,417	9.79
Republican	Brenda A. Sheriff	12,994	9.48
Republican	Julia Fairfax	12,923	9.43
Republican	Brian G. Doherty	12,839	9.36
Republican	William Allen E. Boyd	12,684	9.25
Republican	Stephan J. Evans	12,669	9.24
Republican	Charles J. Fogel	12,517	9.13
Republican	LaFaye L. Casey	12,133	8.85
Republican	Paul J. Taxey	10,967	8.00
Republican	William M. Cronin	10,464	7.63

1986 general election—Cook County Board of Commissioners, Chicago seats
Party	Candidate	Votes	%
Democratic	George W. Dunne (incumbent)	569,517	8.60
Democratic	Charles R. Bernardini	528,928	7.99
Democratic	Jerry "Iceman" Butler (incumbent)	527,951	7.58
Democratic	John H. Stroger, Jr. (incumbent)	520,930	7.87
Democratic	Irene C. Hernandez (incumbent)	506,389	7.65
Democratic	Bobbie L. Steele	503,110	7.60
Democratic	Frank A. Damato	499,689	7.55
Democratic	Samuel G. Vaughan (incumbent)	596,454	7.50
Democratic	Marco Domico	485,772	7.34
Democratic	Rose-Marie Love	482,230	7.29
Republican	Susan Catania	205,219	3.10
Republican	Richard D. Murphy	158,041	2.39
Republican	Brian G. Doherty	156,207	2.36
Republican	Brenda A. Sheriff	146,631	2.22
Republican	Julia Fairfax	142,990	2.16
Republican	William Allen E. Boyd	141,712	2.14
Republican	LaFaye L. Casey	140,180	2.12
Republican	Charles J. Fogel	138,667	2.09
Republican	Stephan J. Evans	137,356	2.07
Republican	Paul J. Taxey	131,957	1.99

1992 Republican primary—Cook County Recorder of Deeds
Party	Candidate	Votes	%
Republican	Susan Catania	152,939	100
Total votes		152,939	100

1992 general election—Cook County Recorder of Deeds
Party	Candidate	Votes	%
Democratic	Jesse White (incumbent)	1,121,885	58.07
Republican	Susan Catania	809,963	41.93
Total votes		1,931,848	100
