= 1982 Illinois gubernatorial election =

- November 2, 1982
- Turnout: 61.58% ▲7.35 pp
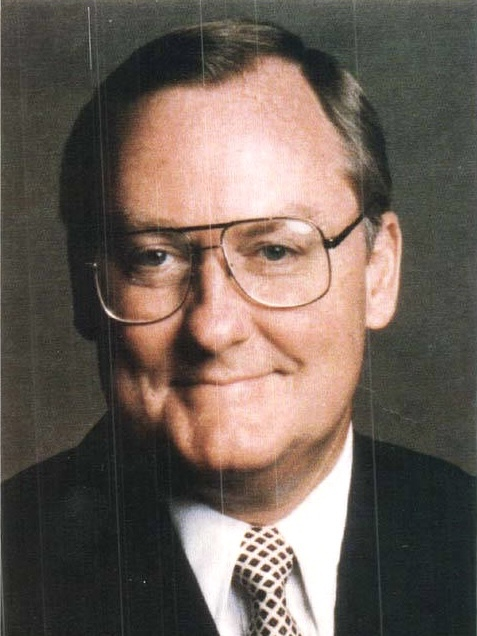

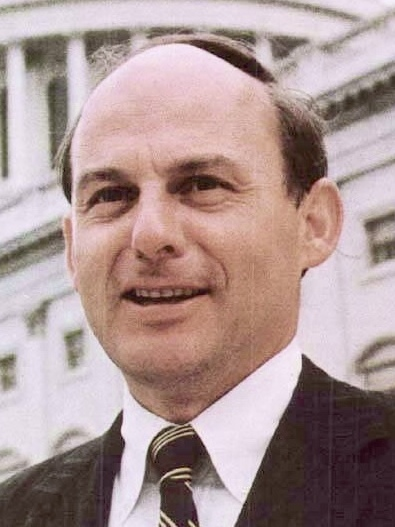
Nominee	Jim Thompson	Adlai Stevenson III
Party	Republican	Democratic
Running mate	George Ryan	Grace Mary Stern
Popular vote	1,816,101	1,811,027
Percentage	49.44%	49.30%
- County results Thompson: 40–50% 50–60% 60–70% 70–80% Stevenson: 40–50% 50–60% 60–70%
Governor before election
James R. Thompson
Republican
Elected Governor
James R. Thompson
Republican

The 1982 Illinois gubernatorial election was held in Illinois on November 2, 1982. Incumbent Republican governor James R. Thompson won a third term in office, defeating the Democratic nominee, former United States Senator Adlai Stevenson III, by a slim margin of 5,074 votes.

== Background ==
The election coincided with those for Congress and those for other state offices. The election was part of the 1982 Illinois elections.

Turnout in the primaries saw 22.42% in the gubernatorial primaries, with a total of 1,337,581 votes cast, and 20.25% in the lieutenant gubernatorial primary, with 1,208,178 votes cast.

Turnout during the general election was 61.58%, with 3,673,707 votes cast.

== Democratic primary ==
=== Governor ===
Adlai Stevenson III, former United States Senator as well as the son of former Governor and 1952 and 1956 Democratic presidential nominee Adlai Stevenson II and great-grandson of former Vice President Adlai Stevenson I, won the primary for the gubernatorial nomination unopposed.

Democratic gubernatorial primary
Party	Candidate	Votes	%
Democratic	Adlai E. Stevenson	731,041	99.99
Write-in		94	0.01
Total votes		731,135	100

=== Lieutenant governor ===
Grace Mary Stern won the Democratic primary for lieutenant governor unopposed.

Democratic lieutenant gubernatorial primary
Party	Candidate	Votes	%
Democratic	Grace Mary Stern	588,942	99.98
Write-in		103	0.02
Total votes		589,045	100

== Republican primary ==
=== Governor ===
Incumbent James R. Thompson defeated challengers John E. Roche and V. A. Kelley.

Republican gubernatorial primary
Party	Candidate	Votes	%
Republican	James R. Thompson (incumbent)	507,893	83.75
Republican	John E. Roche	54,858	9.05
Republican	V. A. Kelley	43,627	7.19
Write-in		68	0.01
Total votes		606,446	100

=== Lieutenant governor ===
George Ryan defeated Susan Catania and Donald L. Totten in the lieutenant gubernatorial primary.

Republican lieutenant gubernatorial primary
Party	Candidate	Votes	%
Republican	George Ryan	278,544	44.99
Republican	Susan Catania	188,220	30.40
Republican	Donald L. Totten	152,356	24.61
Write-in		13	0.00
Total votes		619,133	100

== General election results ==
Stevenson complained that Thompson was trying to portray him as an ineffectual elitist by famously stating, "He is saying 'Me tough guy,' as if to imply that I'm some kind of wimp." Before the election, Thompson had been favored by polls and predictions to win by roughly twenty percentage points.

The nominees of the third-party Libertarian and Taxpayers tickets were both right-of-center, and were therefore regarded as more likely to siphon off more potential supporters from Thompson than from Stevenson.

=== Statewide result ===
Thompson won by a narrow 5,074 vote margin. Thompson carried 83 of Illinois' 102 counties, while Stevenson carried on 19. However, Stevenson won Cook County, home of Chicago. Cook County accounted for a substantial share of the state's population. Thompson had actually carried the vote of suburban Cook County. However, Stevenson had managed to win the city of Chicago by a margin of nearly 4 to 1. Thompson's narrow victory was likely attributable, in part, to his strong performance in the collar counties (the five counties that border Cook County; DuPage, Kane, Lake, McHenry, and Will).

The 1982 Democratic ticket performed better than the Democratic ticket had in the previous 1978 gubernatorial election. In the cumulative vote of Cook County and the five collar counties (DuPage, Kane, Lake, McHenry, and Will), the 1982 Democratic Ticket performed 10% better than the 1978 ticket had. At the time, the downstate Illinois vote was seen as very important to determining victory in Illinois statewide elections. The 1982 Democratic ticket performed better than the 1978 had in downstate Illinois. However, despite the Republican ticket performing weaker in downstate Illinois than it had in the 1978 election, the Republican ticket still managed to win downstate Illinois by a 136,917 vote margin, which was a key factor in securing their victory.

1982 gubernatorial election, Illinois
Party	Candidate	Votes	%
Republican	James R. Thompson (incumbent)/ George H. Ryan	1,816,101	49.44
Democratic	Adlai Stevenson III/ Grace Mary Stern	1,811,027	49.30
Libertarian	Bea Armstrong/ David L. Kelley	24,417	0.66
Taxpayers	John E. Roche/ Melvin "Mel" Jones	22,001	0.60
Write-in		161	0.00
Majority		5,074	0.14
Turnout		3,673,707	61.58
Republican hold			

=== Rate of voter participation ===
3,673,707 (61.58%) of the state's 5,965,514 registered voters voted in the gubernatorial election. This percentage of registered voters participating in the 1982 gubernatorial election marked a 7.35% increase from that of the preceding 1978 gubernatorial election.

183,311 of the 3,856,875 individuals that cast ballots in the state's 1982 general election did not vote in the gubernatorial race. This number of "blank votes" in the gubernatorial election was equal to 4.75% of the voters who participated in the state general election, and 3.07% of the state's registered voters. 2,108,639 (35.35%) of the state's registered voters did not cast valid ballots in the state's general election. The combined total of the registered voters who cast no valid ballot and the registered voters who cast ballots with "blank votes" in the gubernatorial election meant that 2,291,950 (38.42%) of the registered voters did not vote in the gubernatorial election.

=== Geographic breakdowns of the results ===
==== Chicago vs. suburban Cook County vs. collar counties vs. downstate Illinois ====
The following table breaks down the results into three categories, providing a comparative breakdown between the results in Chicago, the results in suburban Cook County, the results in the five collar counties (DuPage, Kane, Lake, McHenry, and Will), and the results of the remainder of Illinois ("downstate Illinois").

Chicago vs. suburban Cook County vs. collar counties vs. downstate Illinois
Region	Thompson vote	Stevenson vote	Margin	Notes
Chicago	259,963 (26%)	728,580 (74%)	446,617 Stevenson	Thompson carried 2 wards while Stevenson carried 48
Suburban Cook County	436,095 (61%)	279,000 (39%)	157,095 Thompson	Thompson carried 28 townships while Stevenson carried 2
Collar counties	341,971 (68%)	162,292 (32%)	179,679 (34.97%) Thompson	Thompson carried 5 counties, while Sevenson carried 0
Downstate Illinois (96 counties)	778,072 (54.15%)	641,115 (44.62%)	136,917 (9.53%) Thompson	Thompson carried 78 counties while Stevenson carried 18

==== Cook County and collar counties vs. downstate Illinois ====
The following table breaks down the results into two categories, providing a comparative breakdown between the cumulative results of Cook County and the five collar counties (DuPage, Kane, Lake, McHenry, and Will) with the results of the remainder of Illinois ("downstate Illinois"). Thompson performed stronger in downstate Illinois than he did in the cumaltive vote of Cook County and the collar counties, while Stevenson inversely performed stronger in the cumulative vote of Cook County and the collar counties than he did in downstate Illinois.

As this table indicates, Cook County and the collar counties cumulatively were the location of 60.91% of the statewide vote, with downstate Illinois being the location of only 39.09% of the statewide vote.

Cook County and collar counties vs. downstate Illinois
Region	Thompson vote	Stevenson vote	Armstrong vote	Roche vote	Write-in vote	Total vote	% of overall state vote	Margin	Counties carried by candidate
Cook County and collar counties	1,038,029 (46.39%)	1,169,872 (52.28%)	15,758 (0.70%)	14,036 (0.63%)	128 (0.00%)	2,237,823	60.91%	109,843 (4.91%) Stevenson	Thompson: 5 Stevenson: 1
Downstate Illinois (96 counties)	778,072 (54.19%)	641,115 (44.65%)	8,659 (0.60%)	7,965 (0.55%)	33 (0.00%)	1,435,884	39.09%	136,917 (9.54%) Thompson	Thompson: 78; Stevenson: 18

==== General geographic breakdown of Cook County and collar counties ====
The following table gives a comparative breakdown of the results in the Chicago metropolitan area counties, breaking these results into three categories: the result within the municipal limits of Chicago, the results in the remainder of Cook County ("suburban Cook County"), and the cumulative results of the five collar counties of DuPage, Kane, Lake, McHenry, and Will.

Geographic breakdown of results in Cook County and collar counties
Region	Thompson vote	Stevenson vote	Margin	Notes
Chicago	259,963 (26%)	728,580 (74%)	446,617 Stevenson	Thompson carried 2 wards while Stevenson carried 48
Suburban Cook County	436,095 (61%)	279,000 (39%)	157,095 Thompson	Thompson carried 28 townships while Stevenson carried 2
Collar counties	341,971 (68%)	162,292 (32%)	179,679 (34.97%) Thompson	Thompson carried 5 counties, while Sevenson carried 0
Total	1,038,029 (46.41%)	1,169,872 (52.30%)	109,843 (4.91%) Stevenson	

==== Chicago vs. suburban Cook County and the collar counties ====
The following table gives a comparative breakdown of the results Chicago metropolitan area counties, contrasting the result within the municipal limits of Chicago with the outlying vote in the outlying area of its metropolitan area counties (Cook County and the five collar counties of DuPage, Kane, Lake, McHenry, and Will).

Cook County and the five collar counties saw a cumulative total of 2,237,823 votes cast between them, equivalent to 60.89% of the statewide total.

This table demonstrates that, while Stevenson had carried the cumulative vote of Cook County and the collar counties, he had only done so due to his landslide performance (74%) in Chicago. The table demonstrates that Thompson won a landslide in cumulative vote of suburban Cook County and the collar counties (64%), performing even stronger there than his 55% performance in downstate Illinois.

Chicago vs. suburban Cook County and the collar counties
Region	Thompson vote	Stevenson vote	Margin
Chicago	259,963 (26%)	728,580 (74%)	446,617 (45.18%) Stevenson
Suburban Cook County and collar counties	778,066 (64%)	441,292 (36%)	336,774 (27.62%) Thompson
Total	1,038,029 (46.41%)	1,169,872 (52.30%)	109,843 (4.91%) Stevenson

==== Geographic breakdown of collar counties ====
The following table gives a comparative breakdown of the results in each of the five collar counties. The cumulative vote of the collar counties (513,825 votes) was equivalent to 13.99% of the statewide vote.

County breakdown of Collar County results
County	Thompson vote	Stevenson vote	Armstrong vote	Roche vote	Write-in vote	Total vote	% of overall state vote	Thompson's margin over Stevenson
DuPage	138,502 (71.44%)	51,543 (25.59%)	1,974 (1.02%)	1,824 (0.94%)	20 (0.01%)	193,863	5.28%	86,959 (44.86%)
Kane	48,513 (67.36%)	22,132 (30.73%)	744 (1.03%)	612 (0.85%)	17 (0.02%)	72,018	1.96%	26,381 (36.63%)
Lake	72,420 (62.93%)	40,757 (35.42%)	1,090 (0.95%)	803 (0.70%)	4 (0.00%)	115,074	3.13%	31,663 (27.52%)
McHenry	29,343 (72.74%)	10,181 (25.24%)	442 (1.10%)	374 (0.93%)	2 (0.00%)	40,342	1.10%	19,162 (47.50%)
Will	53,193 (57.49%)	37,679 (40.72%)	668 (0.72%)	983 (1.06%)	5 (0.00%)	92,528	2.52%	15,514 (15.77%)
Total	341,971 (66.55%)	162,292 (31.59%)	4,918 (0.96%)	4,596 (0.89%)	48 (0.00%)	513,825	13.99%	179,679 (34.97%)

==== Geographic breakdown of Cook County ====
The following table gives a comparative breakdown of the results in Cook County, contrasting the votes cast in the municipal limits of Chicago with the votes cast in the remainder of Cook County ("suburban Cook County").

Cook County saw a total of 1,723,998 votes cast, equivalent to 46.93% of all votes cast in the election.

This table demonstrates that, while Stevenson won a 58.48% of the vote in Cook County, with a margin of 18.07% over Thompson, this was solely attributable to Stevenson's 44.75% margin over Thompson in Chicago, as Thompson actually carried the remainder of Cook County by a 21.97% margin over Stevenson.

Breakdown of Cook County results
Region	Thompson vote	Stevenson vote	Margin
Chicago	259,963 (26%)	728,580 (74%)	446,617 (44.75%) Stevenson
Suburban Cook County	436,095 (61%)	279,000 (39%)	157,095 (21.97%) Thompson
Total	696,058 (40.37%))	1,007,580 (58.44%)	311,522 (18.07%) Stevenson

==== Geographic breakdown of Stevenson's vote ====
40.23% of Stevenson's votes came from Chicago. 15.41% of Stevenson's votes came from suburban Cook County. 8.96% of Stevenson's votes came from the collar counties. 35.40% of Stevenson's votes came from downstate Illinois.

==== Geographic breakdown of Thompson's vote ====
14.31% of Thompson's votes came from Chicago. 24.01% of Thompson's votes came from suburban Cook County. 18.83% of Thompson's votes came from the collar counties. 42.84% of Thompson's votes came from downstate Illinois.

== Post-election day developments ==
=== Certification of results ===
The final canvass conducted by election officials was conducted on November 22, 1982. The Illinois State Board of Elections certified the result on January 23, 1982.

=== Partial recounts ===
For the first time since its passage in 1977, Illinois' law outlining election recounts was invoked. The law enabled candidates to request partial recounts of the votes in up to 25% of the state's more than 7,000 election precincts, with candidates being able to hand-pick the precincts to be recounted. Stevenson opted for a recount of precincts in 70 of the state's 102 counties. The counties chosen where ones where Thompson had received a strong share of the vote. Thompson also opted to invoke his right to a partial recount, and chose to have a recount of precincts in 32 of Chicago's 50 wards. The wards in question were ones where Stevenson had received a strong share of the vote.

=== Unsuccessful petition by Stevenson for a full state recount ===
On December 7, 1982, Stevenson and Stern filed a petition with the Illinois Supreme Court requesting a recount. Stevenson and Stern's petition argued that the election had been impacted by "widespread irregularities and error". Thompson and Ryan filed their objections to this on December 10, 1982. Under the state's 1977 election recount law, if a complete statewide recount had been ordered, the recount would have been supervised by a three-member panel of Illinois Circuit Court judges. Under the law, the Illinois Supreme Court would have selected the three judges to serve on the panel.

At the time of the case, four of the Illinois Supreme Court's seven justices were Democrats. Oral arguments were heard by the court on December 21, 1982. Stevenson put forth an argument that, based on the evidence gathered in the partial recount of 500,000 votes in 70 of the state's 102 counties, that he believed a full statewide recount would find him to have won the election by an approximately 11,000-vote margin. Stevenson claimed that the partial recount in the precincts he had selected had found enough invalid ballots to decrease Thompson's margin-of-victory from 5,074 to merely 325 votes. However, Thompson's legal counsel characterized a recount as unwarranted, and also challenged the figures Stevenson alleged that the recount of his selected counties had indicated. Thompson argued that many of the ballots which Stevenson had characterized as illegitimate had been so-characterized due to "defacing" that was actually the result of markings from electronic tabulating machines. Thompson's legal counsel argued that Stevenson did not provide the level of evidence required by the state's 1977 election recount law (a law which had, up until then, never been tested).

On January 7, 1983, the court issued a 4–3 decision, with a majority opinion authored by Chief Justice Howard C. Ryan, rejecting Stevenson's petition for a recount. The majority opinion of the court found insufficient evidence of either mistakes, fraud, or irregularities to warrant a recount. Furthermore, in their decision, the court found the state's 1977 law outlining rules for statewide election recounts to be unconstitutional, finding that, in passing the law, the Illinois Legislature unconstitutionally established what was effectively a new court due to the provision having a three-member panel of Illinois Circuit Court judges oversee statewide recounts. The opinion cited the 1975 state decision Rice v. Cunningham in finding that, "the General Assembly did not have the authority to provide that a case be heard by a three judge panel," and that, "the 1970 Constitution confers no authority in the legislature to create new courts". The court's axing of the 1977 election law had been unprompted by either party in the case. The majority opinion was supported by Republican justices Howard C. Ryan, Thomas Moran, Robert C. Underwood, and Democratic justice Seymour Simon. Dissenting were Democratic justices William G. Clark, Joseph Goldenhersh, and Daniel P. Ward.

The court's opinion was issued merely three days before the scheduled inauguration of the gubernatorial and lieutenant gubernatorial terms. Hours after the court's decision, Stevenson conceded defeat, and declared that he would not challenge the court's decision.

=== Fraud convictions ===
In January 1983, when the Illinois Supreme Court rejected the petition by Stevenson for a full statewide recount, the majority decision had opined that there was insufficient evidence of either mistakes, fraud, or irregularities that to justify a recount. However, in December 1984, a special grand jury issued 62 indictments (ultimately result in 58 convictions), many involving precinct captains and election officials, for election fraud related to the 1982 Illinois elections. The grand jury had judged that, in their opinion, 100,000 fraudulent votes had been cast in Chicago. In its 26-page report, the grand jury alleged that, in one Chicago ward, votes were bought for $2 a vote, and in one precinct captain incentivized voters by distributing drinks. It was alleged that 10% of the votes that had been examined were fraudulently cast. Authorities alleged that they had discovered large fraud involving vote buying and voter impersonation. Authorities alleged that in one instance, they discovered that a ballot which had been cast for the Democratic Party slate was tabulated 198 times. The case was prosecuted by US Attorney Dan K. Webb.

The gubernatorial election result has been questioned. Some Democrats have alleged that fraud might have committed by Republicans in areas outside Chicago to secure Thompson his victory. In 2016, Rudy Giuliani suggested that the gubernatorial results had been fraudulent on the part of Chicago Democrats.
