= 1992 Cook County, Illinois, elections =

- November 3, 1992
- Turnout: 75.21%

The Cook County, Illinois, general election was held on November 3, 1992.

Primaries were held March 17, 1992.

Elections were held for Clerk of the Circuit Court, Recorder of Deeds, State's Attorney, three seats on the Water Reclamation District Board, and judgeships on the Circuit Court of Cook County.

== Election information ==
1992 was a presidential election year in the United States. The primaries and general elections for Cook County races coincided with those for federal races (President, House, and Senate) and those for state elections.

=== Voter turnout ===
==== Primary election ====
Turnout in the primaries was 30.39%, with 1,174,298 ballots cast. Chicago saw 697,781 ballots cast, and suburban Cook County saw 40.20% turnout (with 476,517 ballots cast).

Vote totals of primaries
Primary	Chicago vote totals	Suburban Cook County vote totals	Total Cook County vote totals
Democratic	653,539	299,194	952,733
Republican	41,631	168,488	210,119
Harold Washington Party	296	0	296
Nonpartisan	2,315	8,835	11,150
Total	697,781	476,517	1,174,298

==== General election ====
The general election saw turnout of 75.21%, with 2,199,608 ballots cast. Chicago saw 1,137,379 ballots cast, and suburban Cook County saw 75.88% turnout (with 1,062,229 ballots cast).

=== Straight-ticket voting ===
Ballots had a straight-ticket voting option in 1992.

Party	Number of straight-ticket votes
Democratic	407,625
Republican	208,155
Conservative	4,118
Economic Recovery	5,219
Harold Washington	32,956
Independent Congressional	5,862
Independent Progressive	6
Louanner Peters	5,949
Natural Law	285
New Alliance Party	52
Populist	199
Socialist Workers Party	101

== Clerk of the Circuit Court ==
1992 Clerk of the Circuit Court of Cook County election
- November 3, 1992
- Turnout: 67.49%
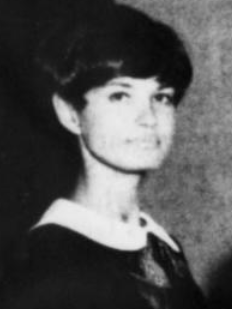

Candidate	Aurelia Pucinski	Herb Schumann	Dee Jones
Party	Democratic	Republican	Harold Washington
Popular vote	1,349,837	486,185	137,642
Percentage	68.39%	24.63%	6.97%
Clerk before election
Aurelia Pucinski
Democratic
Elected Clerk
Aurelia Pucinski
Democratic

In the 1992 Clerk of the Circuit Court of Cook County election, incumbent first-term clerk Aurelia Pucinski, a Democrat, was reelected.

=== Primaries ===
==== Democratic ====
Clerk of the Circuit Court of Cook County Democratic primary
Party	Candidate	Votes	%
Democratic	Aurelia Marie Pucinski (incumbent)	543,705	100
Total votes		543,705	100

==== Republican ====
Clerk of the Circuit Court of Cook County Republican primary
Party	Candidate	Votes	%
Republican	Herbert T. Schumann, Jr.	146,046	100
Total votes		146,046	100

=== General election ===
Pucinski defeated Cook County commissioner and Palos Township Republican Organization chairman Herbert T. Schumann, Jr. and Harold Washington Party nominee Dee Jones.

Clerk of the Circuit Court of Cook County election
Party	Candidate	Votes	%
Democratic	Aurelia Marie Pucinski	1,349,837	68.39
Republican	Herbert T. Schumann, Jr.	486,185	24.63
Harold Washington	Deloris "Dee" Jones	137,642	6.97
Total votes		1,973,664	100

== Recorder of Deeds ==
1992 Cook County Recorder of Deeds election
- November 3, 1992
- Turnout: 55.55%
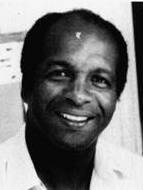

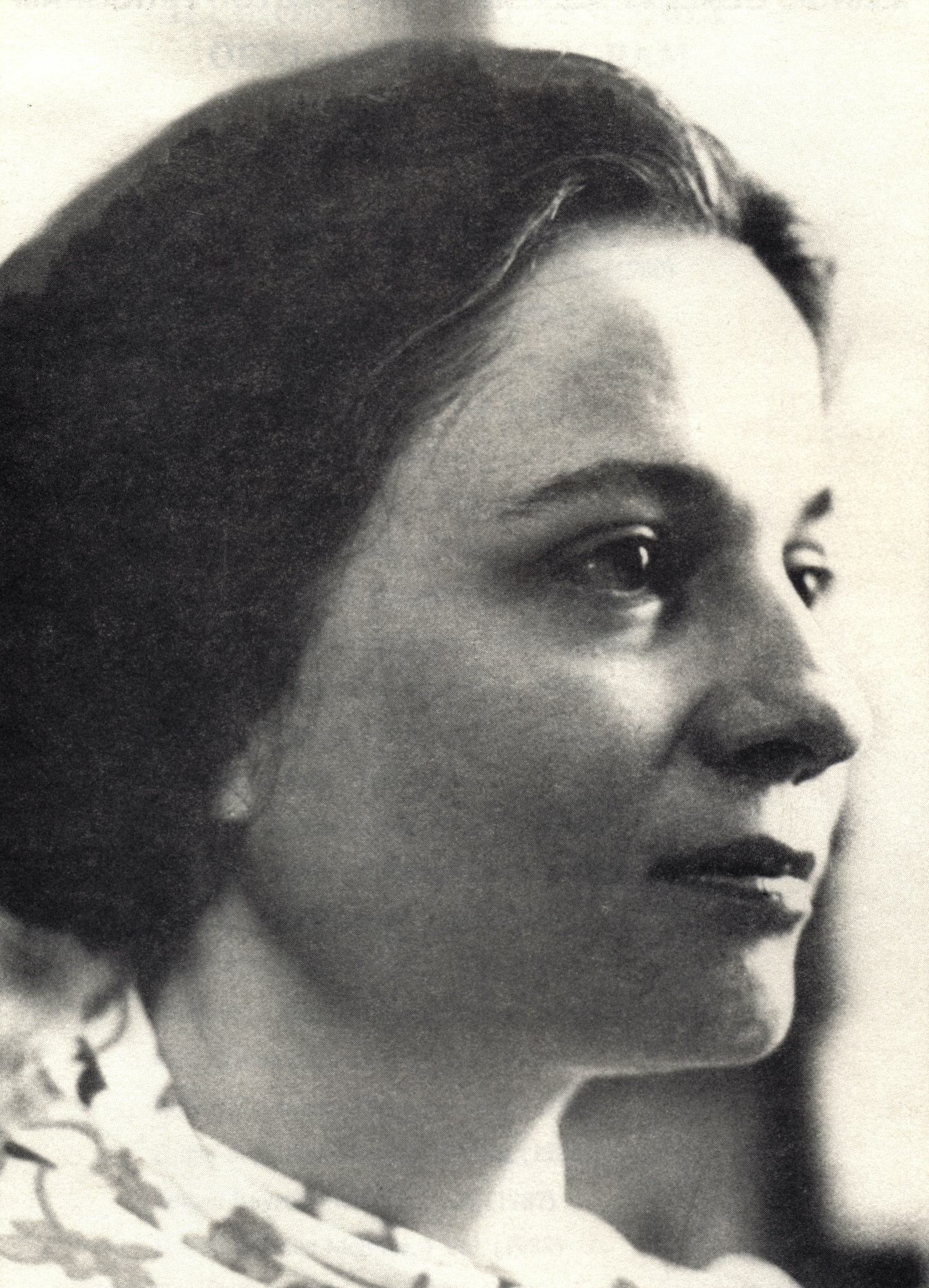
Candidate	Jesse White	Susan Catania
Party	Democratic	Republican
Popular vote	1,121,865	809,963
Percentage	58.07%	41.93%
Recorder of Deeds before election
Carol Moseley Braun
Democratic
Elected Recorder of Deeds
Jesse White
Democratic

In the 1992 Cook County Recorder of Deeds election, incumbent first-term recorder of deeds Carol Mosely Braun, a Democrat, did not seek reelection, instead running for United States Senate. Democrat Jesse White was elected to succeed her.

White's election made him the second African-American, after Moseley Braun herself, and first African-American man to hold the office of Cook County recorder of deeds.

=== Primaries ===
==== Democratic ====
Cook County Recorder of Deeds Democratic primary
Party	Candidate	Votes	%
Democratic	Jesse C. White, Jr.	286,882	41.18
Democratic	Mary "O'Hara" Considine	253,554	36.40
Democratic	Bobbie L. Steele	156,156	22.42
Total votes		696,592	100

==== Republican ====
Cook County Recorder of Deeds Republican primary
Party	Candidate	Votes	%
Republican	Susan Catania	152,939	100
Total votes		152,939	100

=== General election ===
Cook County Recorder of Deeds election
Party	Candidate	Votes	%
Democratic	Jesse White (incumbent)	1,121,865	58.07
Republican	Susan Catania	809,963	41.93
Total votes		1,931,828	100

== State's Attorney ==
1992 Cook County State's Attorney election
- November 3, 1992
- Turnout: 71.04%

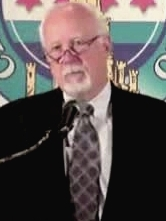
Candidate	Jack O'Malley	Patrick J. O'Connor
Party	Republican	Democratic
Popular vote	1,272,939	804,528
Percentage	61.27%	38.73%
State's Attorney before election
Jack O'Malley
Republican
Elected State's Attorney
Jack O'Malley
Republican

In the 1992 Cook County State's Attorney election, incumbent state's attorney Jack O'Malley, a Republican first elected in a special election in 1990, won reelection to a full term.

This is the last time that a Republican has won election to a Cook County executive office.

=== Primaries ===
==== Democratic ====
Chicago alderman Patrick J. O'Connor defeated former assistant state's attorney Jim Gierach, Kenneth A. Malatesta, and public guardian Patrick T. Murphy.

Cook County State’s Attorney Democratic primary
Party	Candidate	Votes	%
Democratic	Patrick J. O'Connor	390,449	52.51
Democratic	Patrick T. Murphy	152,976	20.57
Democratic	Jim Gierach	103,581	13.93
Democratic	Kenneth A. Malatesta	96,593	12.99
Total votes		743,599	100

==== Republican ====
Cook County State’s Attorney Republican primary
Party	Candidate	Votes	%
Republican	John M. "Jack" O'Malley (incumbent)	172,604	100
Total votes		172,604	100

=== General election ===
Cook County State’s Attorney election
Party	Candidate	Votes	%
Republican	John M. "Jack" O'Malley (incumbent)	1,272,939	61.27
Democratic	Patrick J. O'Connor	804,528	38.73
Total votes		2,077,467	100

== Water Reclamation District Board ==
1992 Metropolitan Water Reclamation District of Greater Chicago election
- November 3, 1992

3 of 9 seats on the Metropolitan Water Reclamation District of Greater Chicago

In the 1992 Metropolitan Water Reclamation District of Greater Chicago election, three of the nine seats on the Metropolitan Water Reclamation District of Greater Chicago board were up for election in an at-large election. All three Democratic nominees won.

== Judicial elections ==
Pasrtisan elections were held for judgeships on the Circuit Court of Cook County due to vacancies. Retention elections were also held for the Circuit Court.

Partisan elections were also held for subcircuit courts judgeships due to vacancies. Retention elections were held for other judgeships.

== Ballot questions ==
One ballot question was included on ballots county-wide during the November general election, and another was included in the entirety of suburban Cook County (but not in the city of Chicago).

=== National Health Insurance (advisory referendum) ===
An advisory referendum on national health insurance was included on ballots county-wide.

National Health Insurance advisory referendum
Candidate	Votes	%
Yes	1,089,002	76.62
No	332,245	23.38
Total votes	1,421,247	100
Turnout	{{{votes}}}	48.60%

=== 911 (suburban advisory referendum) ===
An advisory referendum on 9-1-1 was included on ballots in suburban Cook County (the entire county excluding the city of Chicago.

911 suburban advisory referendum
Candidate	Votes	%
Yes	50,246	47.45
No	55,646	52.55
Total votes	105,892	100

== Other elections ==
Coinciding with the primaries, elections were held to elect both the Democratic, Republican, and Harold Washington Party committeemen for the wards of Chicago.

== See also ==
- 1992 Illinois elections
