= Goldenhersh =

Goldenhersh is a surname. Notable people with the surname include:

- Heather Goldenhersh (born 1973), American actress
- Joseph H. Goldenhersh (1914–1992), American jurist
- Josh Goldenhersh, American musician
