= Corneal A. Davis =

American politician (1900–1995)

Member of the Illinois House of Representatives from Illinois
- In office 1943–1979

Personal details
- Born: August 28, 1900 Warren County, Mississippi, U.S.
- Died: April 17, 1995 (aged 94)
- Education: Tougaloo College

Military service
- Allegiance: United States
- Branch/service: United States Army
- Unit: Illinois National Guard
- Battles/wars: First World War

Corneal A. Davis (August 28, 1900 – April 17, 1995) was an American politician from Illinois who served in the Illinois House of Representatives from 1943 until 1979 making him the longest serving African American member in the body's history.

== Early life ==
Davis was born on August 28, 1900, in Warren County, Mississippi on a farm near Vicksburg, Mississippi. His family relocated to the Vicksburg city proper for access to educational opportunities. He attended Tougaloo College and graduated with the Class of 1917. He enlisted in the United States Army during World War I and fought during the Meuse-Argonne Offensive. He served in the 92nd Division with the 318th Medical Detachment. He returned to Vicksburg, but left after watching the lynching of a childhood friend. In August 1919, he joined his family, who moved to Chicago to escape violence in Mississippi. He joined Quinn Chapel African Methodist Episcopal Church and eventually rose to become an assistant pastor. He continued his military service as a member of the Illinois National Guard until an honorable discharge in 1931. After working as a shipping clerk he joined William L. Dawson's political organization. Initially a Republican like Dawson, both he and Dawson played a prominent role in persuading Chicago's African Americans to join the Democratic Party during the realignment of African American voting behavior from the Republican to Democratic parties.

In 1939, Davis ran for the Chicago City Council in Chicago's 2nd ward. Earl B. Dickerson defeated Davis in the Democratic primary. Dickerson defeated William E. King in the general election to become the first African American Democrat to serve on the Chicago City Council.

== Illinois House of Representatives ==
Davis was elected to the Illinois House of Representatives in 1942. When he first arrived in Springfield, Illinois he was turned away from the hotel and resorted to staying at the train station. In protest, Abraham Lincoln Marovitz, Illinois's first Jewish State Senator, joined him at the train station.

During his tenure, he backed cost of living increases for welfare recipients and many civil rights measures with a focus on fair employment practices.

When former Speaker of the Illinois House of Representatives and Democratic Minority Leader John Touhy took a seat on the Cook County Board, Davis became the subject of a draft effort by fellow African American House members including Harold Washington, Raymond W. Ewell, and Lewis A. H. Caldwell. Around this time, there was a similar push to elevate Cecil A. Partee to the position of President of the Illinois Senate. Partee was elevated to the Senate presidency while Davis was appointed to the leadership team of Democratic House Minority Leader Clyde L. Choate. In 1975, just months after Democrats regained the majority in the House, Davis resigned his position in leadership after he was ignored during a debate on the Equal Rights Amendment by Speaker William A. Redmond.

In 1977, he announced he would not seek reelection to the Illinois House of Representatives. The Democratic slate for the 22nd that year consisted of Quentin Goodwin, an attorney, and Larry Bullock, a former independent Democrat. At the time of his retirement from the Illinois House of Representatives, he was its most senior member.

=== Civil Rights ===
In 1946, Davis assisted the National Association for the Advancement of Colored People and a group of African American teachers in Cairo, Illinois sue the district over a two to one pay disparity with the district's white teachers. Observers cite his speech against a bill which would have required clinical treatment for fathers accepting welfare benefits who had a "more than an adequate" number of children as one of his most memorable.

Davis was chair in 1963 of the Illinois Emancipation Proclamation Commission and a delegate to the National Black Convention in 1972.

== Post legislative life ==
In 1979, Davis was appointed to the Chicago Board of Elections to replace Howard Medley after the latter's appointment to the Chicago Transit Authority Board. Two years later, he was one of two individuals appointed by Michael Madigan to serve on the 1981 deccenial district reapportionment committee.

In 1986, he and the board's Republican member, voted against a resolution to switch to nonpartisan mayoral elections. Mayor Harold Washington opposed the resolution, believing it was designed to hurt his chances at reelection in the 1987 mayoral election. Chicago switched to nonpartisan municipal elections in 1999. Davis died on April 17, 1995, at age 94. In 1989, his grandson, Albert C. Maule, was appointed President of the Chicago Police Review Board. Maule would serve in this position until his October 1995 death and is survived by his wife Adela Cepeda, a finance executive, and three daughters (Davis' great grandchildren).
