= 1992 United States presidential election in Illinois =

- November 3, 1992
- Turnout: 78.24 ▲4.35 pp

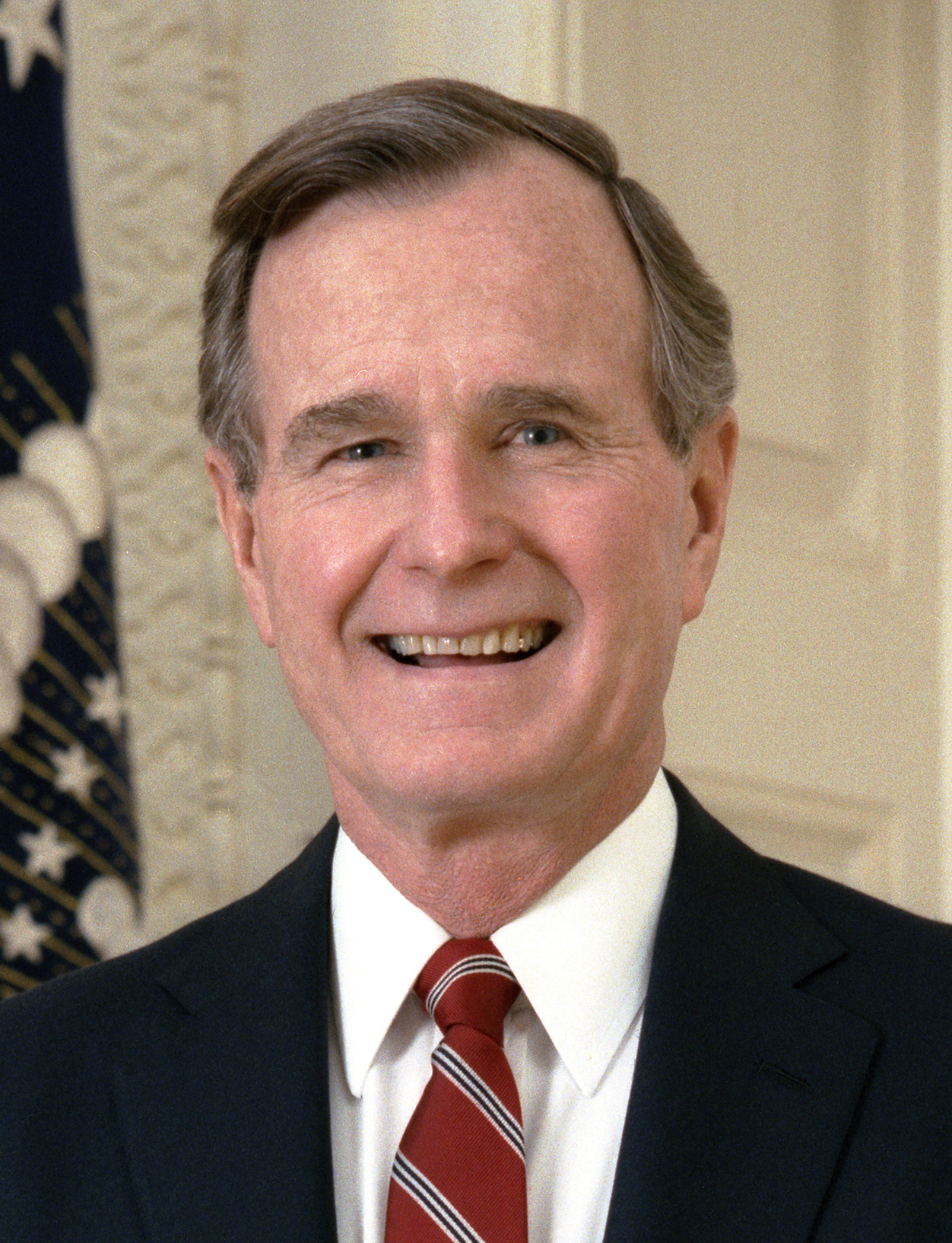

Nominee	Bill Clinton	George H. W. Bush	Ross Perot
Party	Democratic	Republican	Independent
Home state	Arkansas	Texas	Texas
Running mate	Al Gore	Dan Quayle	James Stockdale
Electoral vote	22	0	0
Popular vote	2,453,350	1,734,096	840,515
Percentage	48.58%	34.34%	16.64%
Clinton
30–40%
40–50%
50–60%
60–70%
Bush
30–40%
40–50%
President before election
George H. W. Bush
Republican
Elected President
Bill Clinton
Democratic

The 1992 United States presidential election in Illinois took place on November 3, 1992, as part of the 1992 United States presidential election. Voters chose 22 representatives, or electors to the Electoral College, who voted for president and vice president.

Illinois was won by Governor Bill Clinton (D-Arkansas) with 48.58% of the popular vote over incumbent President George H. W. Bush (R-Texas) with 34.34%. Businessman Ross Perot (I-Texas) finished in third, with 16.64% of the popular vote. In 1988, Democratic nominee Michael Dukakis also received 48.6% of the vote, albeit in a losing effort to Bush, who received 50.7%.

Clinton ultimately won the national vote, defeating incumbent President Bush. Clinton became the first Democrat to win Illinois on a presidential level since 1964, and only the third to do so since 1948. Clinton notably won seven of 21 Illinois counties that had backed Barry Goldwater in 1964. He remains the only Democrat to win Johnson County and Pope County (Note: Clinton would win Pope County again in 1996 but lose Johnson County to Bob Dole.) — Southern and anti-Yankee in culture but converted to Unionism by war — since Stephen A. Douglas in 1860. In Northern Illinois, Clinton became the first Democrat to ever win Whiteside County, which had voted in presidential elections since 1840, the first to win DeKalb County since Franklin Pierce in 1852, and the first to win Bureau, McDonough, and Warren Counties since Franklin D. Roosevelt in 1932.

This represented a realigning election for Illinois in regards to presidential politics. It ended a streak of six consecutive elections in which the state had voted for the Republican ticket. It also began a streak in which the state has voted by double digits for the Democratic ticket in nine consecutive presidential elections.

As of the 2024 presidential election, this is also the last election in which the following counties voted for a Democratic presidential candidate: Brown, Clark, Crawford, Cumberland, Douglas, Edgar, Jasper, Monroe, Richland, and Tazewell.

== Primaries ==
The primaries and general elections coincided with those for other federal elections (Senate and House), as well as those for state offices.

=== Turnout ===
For the state-run primaries (Democratic and Republican), turnout was 39.82%, with 2,335,270 votes cast. For the general election, turnout was 78.24% with 5,164,357 votes cast.

State-run primaries were held for the Democratic, Republican, parties on March 17.

=== Democratic ===
1992 Illinois Democratic presidential primary
- March 17, 1992
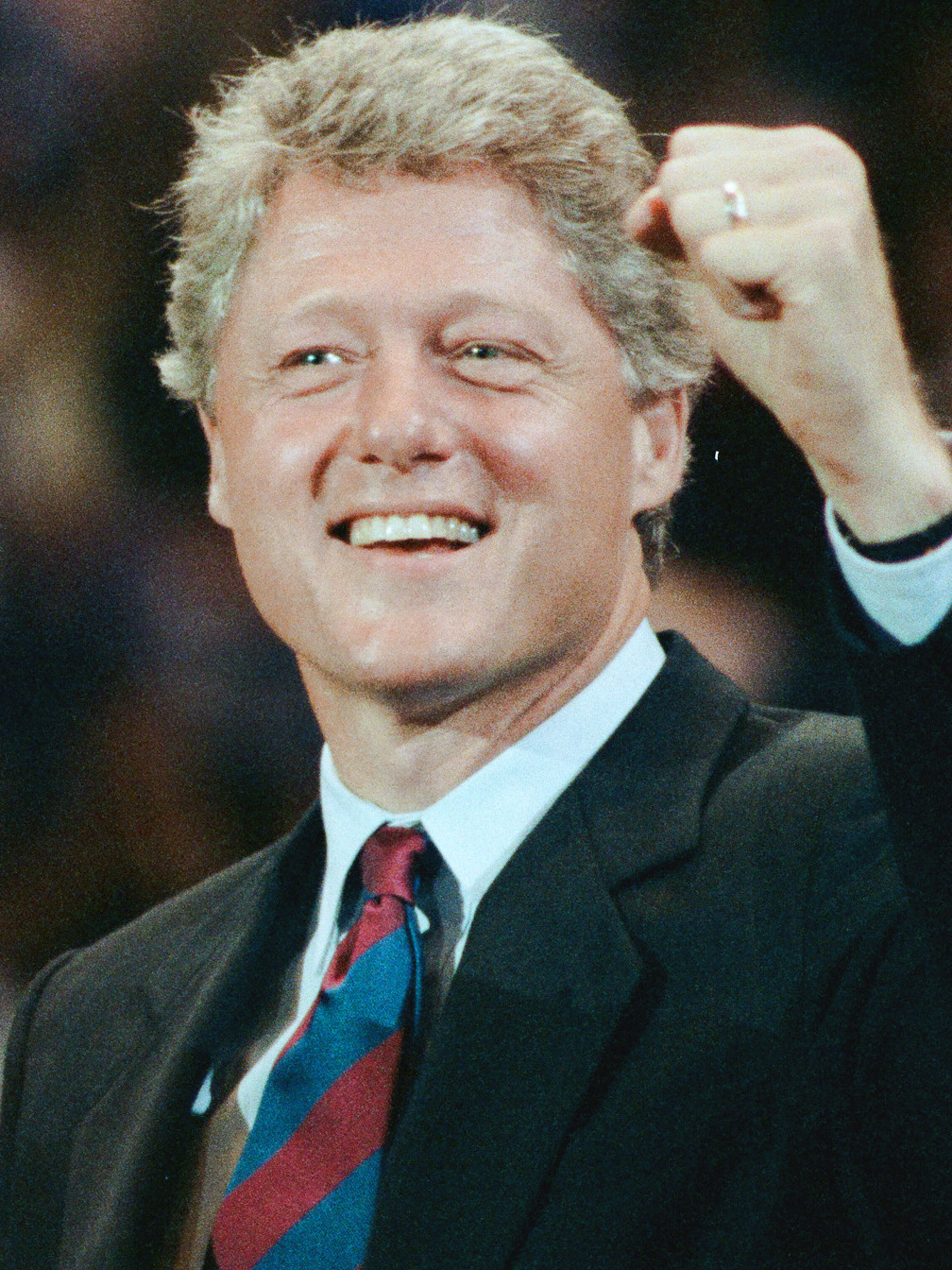

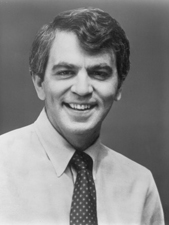

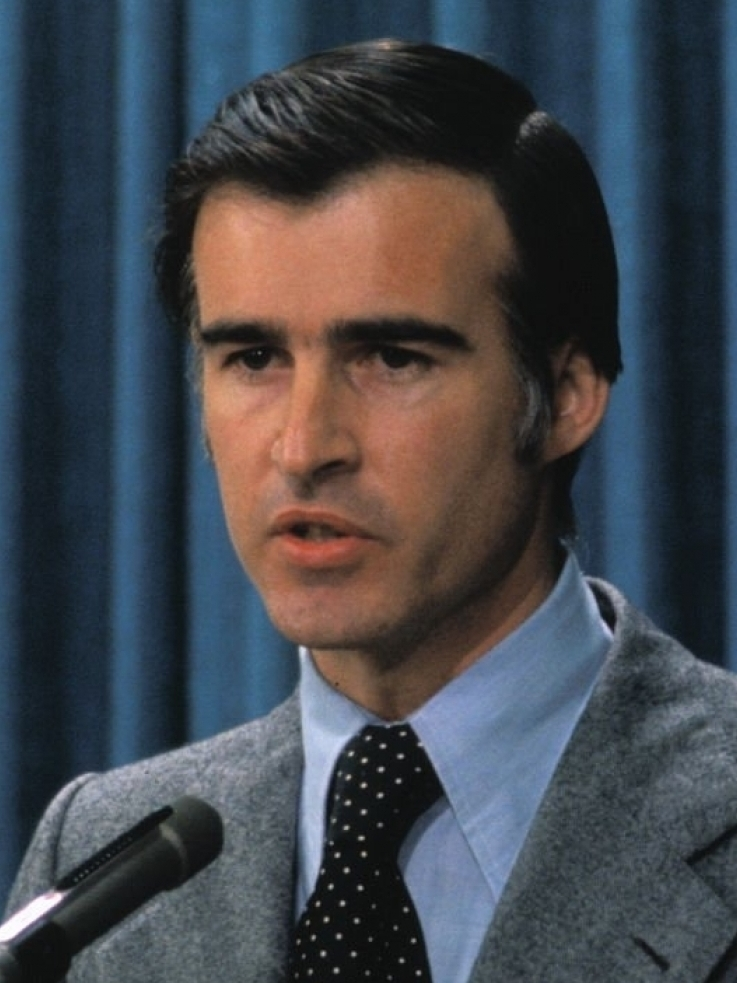
Candidate	Bill Clinton	Paul Tsongas	Jerry Brown
Home state	Arkansas	Massachusetts	California
Popular vote	776,829	387,891	220,346
Percentage	51.65%	25.79%	14.65%
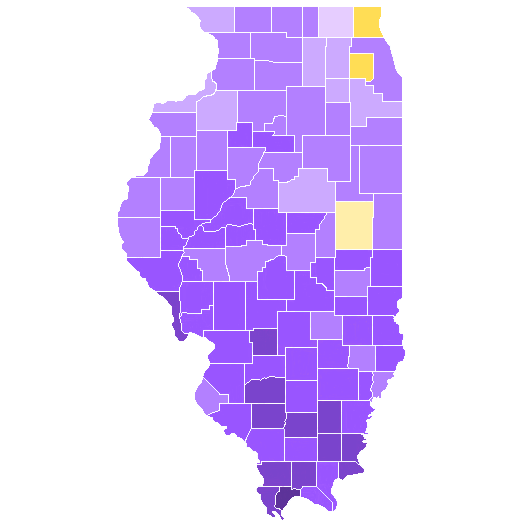
- Results by county Tsongas: 30-40% 40-50% Clinton: 20-30% 30-40% 40-50% 50-60% 60-70% 70-80% 80-90%

The 1992 Illinois Democratic presidential primary was held on March 17, 1992, in the U.S. state of Illinois as one of the Democratic Party's statewide nomination contests ahead of the 1992 presidential election.

1992 Illinois Democratic presidential primary
Candidate	Votes	%	Delegates
Bill Clinton	776,829	51.65	
Paul E. Tsongas	387,891	25.79	
Edmund G. "Jerry" Brown Jr.	220,346	14.65	
Uncommitted	67,612	4.50	
Tom Harkin withdrew	30,710	2.04	
Bob Kerrey withdrew	10,916	0.73	
Lyndon H. LaRouche	6,599	0.44	
Lawrence A. Agran	3,227	0.22	
Total	1,504,130	100	

=== Republican ===
1992 Illinois Republican presidential primary
- March 17, 1992
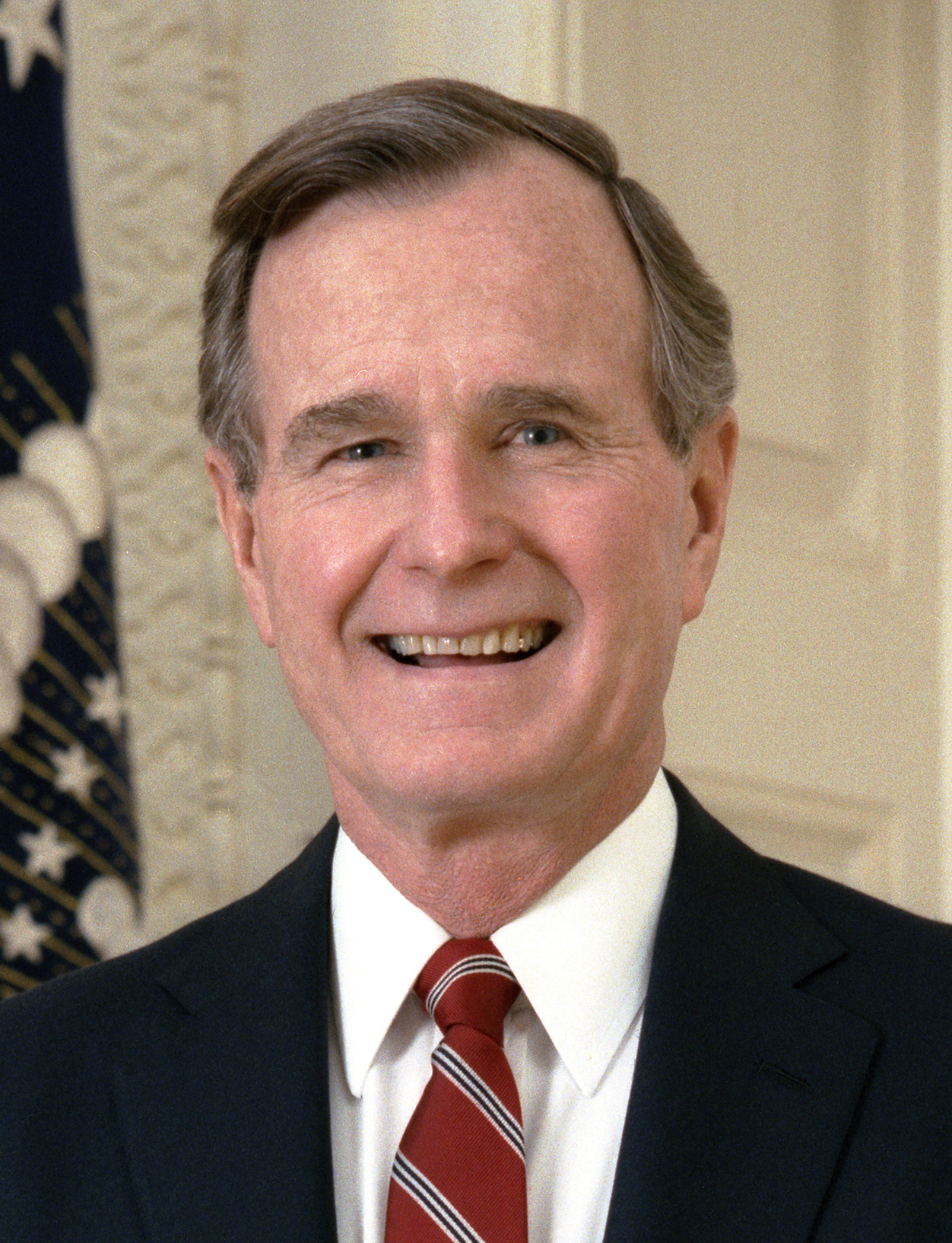

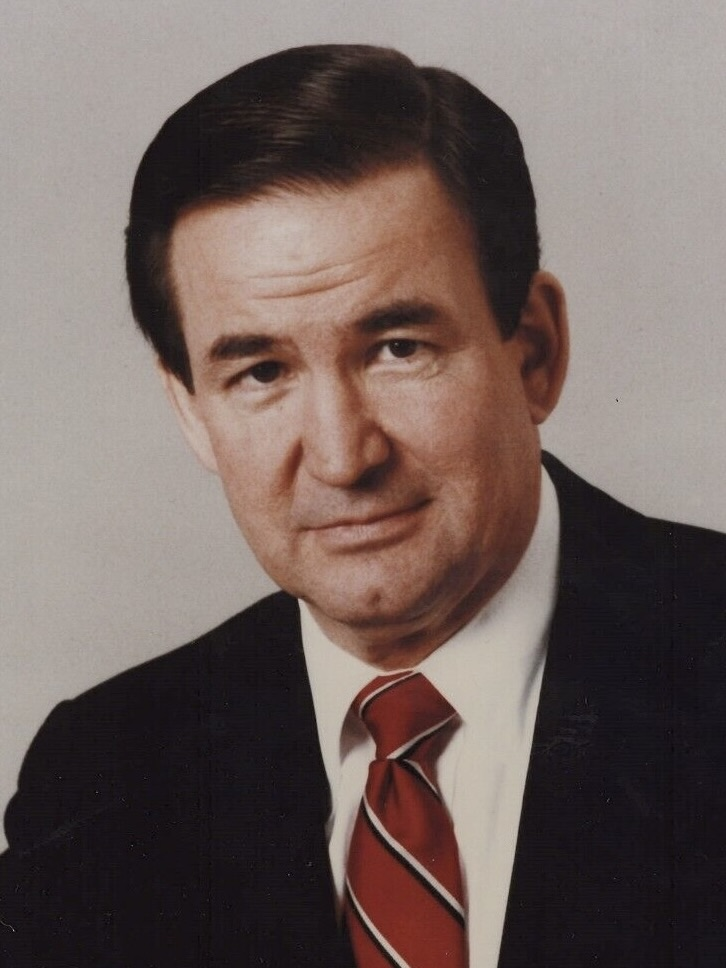
Candidate	George H. W. Bush	Pat Buchanan
Home state	Texas	Virginia
Popular vote	634,588	186,915
Percentage	76.35%	22.49%

The 1992 Illinois Republican presidential primary was held on March 17, 1992, in the U.S. state of Illinois as one of the Republican Party's statewide nomination contests ahead of the 1992 presidential election.

Incumbent president George H. W. Bush won the primary by a large margin.

1992 Illinois Republican presidential primary
Candidate	Votes	%	Delegates
George Bush (incumbent)	634,588	76.35	
Patrick J. Buchanan	186,915	22.49	
Maurice Horton	9,637	1.16	
Total	831,140	100	

== Results ==
1992 United States presidential election in Illinois
Party	Candidate	Votes	Percentage	Electoral votes
Democratic	Bill Clinton	2,453,350	48.58%	22
Republican	George H. W. Bush (incumbent)	1,734,096	34.34%	0
Independent	Ross Perot	840,515	16.64%	0
Libertarian	Andre Marrou	9,218	0.18%	0
New Alliance	Lenora Fulani	5,267	0.10%	0
America First	James "Bo" Gritz	3,577	0.07%	0
Natural Law	Dr. John Hagelin	2,751	0.05%	0
Socialist Workers Party	James Warren	1,361	0.03%	0
Write-ins		22	0.00%	0
Totals		5,050,157	100.0%	22

=== Results by county ===
County	Bill Clinton Democratic		George H.W. Bush Republican		Ross Perot Independent		Various candidates Other parties		Margin		Total votes cast
County	#	%	#	%	#	%	#	%	#	%	Total votes cast
Adams	11,748	37.20%	13,529	42.84%	6,157	19.50%	145	0.46%	-1,781	-5.64%	31,579
Alexander	2,566	58.83%	1,301	29.83%	474	10.87%	21	0.48%	1,265	29.00%	4,362
Bond	3,428	45.42%	2,715	35.97%	1,373	18.19%	32	0.42%	713	9.45%	7,548
Boone	5,114	37.53%	5,589	41.01%	2,880	21.13%	44	0.32%	-475	-3.48%	13,627
Brown	1,146	42.62%	1,029	38.27%	504	18.74%	10	0.37%	117	4.35%	2,689
Bureau	7,551	42.17%	6,836	38.18%	3,465	19.35%	55	0.31%	715	3.99%	17,907
Calhoun	1,519	54.19%	745	26.58%	532	18.98%	7	0.25%	774	27.61%	2,803
Carroll	2,854	37.17%	3,297	42.94%	1,502	19.56%	26	0.34%	-443	-5.77%	7,679
Cass	3,200	49.64%	2,162	33.53%	1,072	16.63%	13	0.20%	1,038	16.11%	6,447
Champaign	35,003	46.00%	27,096	35.61%	13,571	17.83%	422	0.55%	7,907	10.39%	76,092
Christian	9,042	51.40%	5,087	28.92%	3,401	19.33%	60	0.34%	3,955	22.48%	17,590
Clark	3,338	41.83%	3,175	39.79%	1,450	18.17%	16	0.20%	163	2.04%	7,979
Clay	2,962	44.53%	2,471	37.15%	1,193	17.93%	26	0.39%	491	7.38%	6,652
Clinton	6,686	42.26%	5,771	36.47%	3,315	20.95%	50	0.32%	915	5.79%	15,822
Coles	9,402	42.16%	8,098	36.31%	4,707	21.11%	93	0.42%	1,304	5.85%	22,300
Cook	1,249,533	58.21%	605,300	28.20%	281,999	13.14%	9,823	0.46%	644,233	30.01%	2,146,655
Crawford	3,964	40.99%	3,606	37.29%	2,062	21.32%	39	0.40%	358	3.70%	9,671
Cumberland	2,111	40.58%	1,860	35.76%	1,209	23.24%	22	0.42%	251	4.82%	5,202
DeKalb	13,744	40.15%	12,655	36.97%	7,680	22.44%	153	0.45%	1,089	3.18%	34,232
DeWitt	3,009	38.78%	3,164	40.78%	1,543	19.89%	43	0.55%	-155	-2.00%	7,759
Douglas	3,341	40.37%	3,309	39.98%	1,600	19.33%	26	0.31%	32	0.39%	8,276
DuPage	114,564	30.88%	178,271	48.05%	76,839	20.71%	1,313	0.35%	-63,707	-17.17%	370,987
Edgar	4,014	41.06%	3,790	38.77%	1,930	19.74%	42	0.43%	224	2.29%	9,776
Edwards	1,299	36.57%	1,601	45.07%	634	17.85%	18	0.51%	-302	-8.50%	3,552
Effingham	5,221	34.85%	6,329	42.25%	3,354	22.39%	77	0.51%	-1,108	-7.40%	14,981
Fayette	4,833	47.77%	3,508	34.67%	1,730	17.10%	47	0.46%	1,325	13.10%	10,118
Ford	2,175	33.56%	3,046	47.00%	1,222	18.86%	38	0.59%	-871	-13.44%	6,481
Franklin	12,744	59.33%	5,504	25.62%	3,180	14.80%	53	0.25%	7,240	33.71%	21,481
Fulton	9,725	54.94%	5,062	28.60%	2,874	16.24%	40	0.23%	4,663	26.34%	17,701
Gallatin	2,371	60.12%	990	25.10%	568	14.40%	15	0.38%	1,381	35.02%	3,944
Greene	3,164	44.99%	2,391	34.00%	1,461	20.78%	16	0.23%	773	10.99%	7,032
Grundy	6,122	37.64%	6,346	39.02%	3,724	22.90%	73	0.45%	-224	-1.38%	16,265
Hamilton	2,582	51.91%	1,521	30.58%	862	17.33%	9	0.18%	1,061	21.33%	4,974
Hancock	4,213	41.84%	3,714	36.89%	2,091	20.77%	51	0.51%	499	4.95%	10,069
Hardin	1,665	52.47%	985	31.04%	515	16.23%	8	0.25%	680	21.43%	3,173
Henderson	2,013	49.73%	1,310	32.36%	715	17.66%	10	0.25%	703	17.37%	4,048
Henry	11,077	45.45%	8,989	36.88%	4,231	17.36%	74	0.30%	2,088	8.57%	24,371
Iroquois	4,440	30.56%	6,948	47.82%	3,073	21.15%	69	0.47%	-2,508	-17.26%	14,530
Jackson	13,373	54.73%	6,899	28.24%	3,995	16.35%	167	0.68%	6,474	26.49%	24,434
Jasper	2,284	41.68%	1,996	36.42%	1,160	21.17%	40	0.73%	288	5.26%	5,480
Jefferson	8,665	49.24%	5,497	31.24%	3,403	19.34%	32	0.18%	3,168	18.00%	17,597
Jersey	4,749	47.05%	2,933	29.06%	2,363	23.41%	48	0.48%	1,816	17.99%	10,093
Jo Daviess	4,044	38.68%	4,249	40.64%	2,102	20.11%	59	0.56%	-205	-1.96%	10,454
Johnson	2,299	42.65%	2,124	39.40%	944	17.51%	24	0.45%	175	3.25%	5,391
Kane	44,568	34.84%	55,684	43.52%	27,179	21.24%	507	0.40%	-11,116	-8.68%	127,938
Kankakee	17,229	43.00%	15,411	38.46%	7,264	18.13%	167	0.42%	1,818	4.54%	40,071
Kendall	5,423	29.46%	8,521	46.29%	4,394	23.87%	68	0.37%	-3,098	-16.83%	18,406
Knox	12,524	49.51%	8,331	32.93%	4,357	17.22%	84	0.33%	4,193	16.58%	25,296
Lake	81,693	36.47%	99,000	44.20%	42,384	18.92%	910	0.41%	-17,307	-7.73%	223,987
LaSalle	23,276	46.62%	16,078	32.20%	10,434	20.90%	143	0.29%	7,198	14.42%	49,931
Lawrence	3,270	43.67%	2,681	35.80%	1,498	20.01%	39	0.52%	589	7.87%	7,488
Lee	5,530	35.87%	6,652	43.15%	3,191	20.70%	44	0.29%	-1,122	-7.28%	15,417
Livingston	6,007	35.13%	8,004	46.81%	3,029	17.72%	58	0.34%	-1,997	-11.68%	17,098
Logan	5,169	36.41%	6,567	46.26%	2,420	17.05%	39	0.27%	-1,398	-9.85%	14,195
Macon	27,449	49.39%	18,684	33.62%	9,236	16.62%	211	0.38%	8,765	15.77%	55,580
Macoupin	12,050	50.93%	6,518	27.55%	5,018	21.21%	75	0.32%	5,532	23.38%	23,661
Madison	58,484	51.26%	32,167	28.19%	23,110	20.26%	334	0.29%	26,317	23.07%	114,095
Marion	9,669	51.20%	5,764	30.52%	3,407	18.04%	43	0.23%	3,905	20.68%	18,883
Marshall	2,819	43.40%	2,491	38.35%	1,169	18.00%	17	0.26%	328	5.05%	6,496
Mason	3,969	51.53%	2,473	32.11%	1,245	16.16%	15	0.19%	1,496	19.42%	7,702
Massac	3,347	47.43%	2,754	39.03%	892	12.64%	63	0.89%	593	8.40%	7,056
McDonough	5,814	41.76%	5,297	38.05%	2,770	19.90%	41	0.29%	517	3.71%	13,922
McHenry	24,783	28.07%	41,356	46.84%	21,817	24.71%	338	0.38%	-16,573	-18.77%	88,294
McLean	23,090	38.95%	25,726	43.39%	10,282	17.34%	187	0.32%	-2,636	-4.44%	59,285
Menard	2,264	35.94%	2,834	44.99%	1,179	18.72%	22	0.35%	-570	-9.05%	6,299
Mercer	3,990	46.72%	2,983	34.93%	1,535	17.97%	32	0.37%	1,007	11.79%	8,540
Monroe	4,894	39.02%	4,807	38.33%	2,813	22.43%	28	0.22%	87	0.69%	12,542
Montgomery	7,424	50.04%	4,407	29.70%	2,956	19.92%	50	0.34%	3,017	20.34%	14,837
Morgan	6,351	38.97%	6,566	40.29%	3,317	20.35%	63	0.39%	-215	-1.32%	16,297
Moultrie	3,056	47.27%	2,065	31.94%	1,322	20.45%	22	0.34%	991	15.33%	6,465
Ogle	6,512	32.38%	9,008	44.80%	4,455	22.15%	134	0.67%	-2,496	-12.42%	20,109
Peoria	38,099	46.85%	30,718	37.77%	12,195	14.99%	316	0.39%	7,381	9.08%	81,328
Perry	6,009	54.20%	3,105	28.01%	1,955	17.63%	17	0.15%	2,904	26.19%	11,086
Piatt	3,520	41.67%	3,076	36.42%	1,822	21.57%	29	0.34%	444	5.25%	8,447
Pike	4,016	44.44%	3,342	36.98%	1,643	18.18%	36	0.40%	674	7.46%	9,037
Pope	1,063	44.09%	951	39.44%	391	16.22%	6	0.25%	112	4.65%	2,411
Pulaski	1,987	55.99%	1,169	32.94%	379	10.68%	14	0.39%	818	23.05%	3,549
Putnam	1,574	47.58%	969	29.29%	752	22.73%	13	0.39%	605	18.29%	3,308
Randolph	8,529	51.49%	4,899	29.57%	3,092	18.67%	45	0.27%	3,630	21.92%	16,565
Richland	3,286	40.76%	3,053	37.87%	1,689	20.95%	33	0.41%	233	2.89%	8,061
Rock Island	37,412	51.93%	23,212	32.22%	10,416	14.46%	999	1.39%	14,200	19.71%	72,039
Saline	7,258	54.76%	3,667	27.67%	2,302	17.37%	27	0.20%	3,591	27.09%	13,254
Sangamon	40,052	41.35%	39,641	40.93%	16,861	17.41%	306	0.32%	411	0.42%	96,860
Schuyler	1,650	41.30%	1,512	37.85%	815	20.40%	18	0.45%	138	3.45%	3,995
Scott	1,057	37.98%	1,132	40.68%	588	21.13%	6	0.22%	-75	-2.70%	2,783
Shelby	5,101	45.65%	3,631	32.49%	2,401	21.49%	42	0.38%	1,470	13.16%	11,175
St. Clair	57,625	53.58%	31,951	29.71%	17,592	16.36%	373	0.35%	25,674	23.87%	107,541
Stark	1,336	39.87%	1,384	41.30%	625	18.65%	6	0.18%	-48	-1.43%	3,351
Stephenson	7,899	36.47%	9,005	41.58%	4,677	21.60%	75	0.35%	-1,106	-5.11%	21,656
Tazewell	26,428	44.05%	23,469	39.12%	9,927	16.55%	170	0.28%	2,959	4.93%	59,994
Union	4,681	51.54%	3,003	33.06%	1,373	15.12%	26	0.29%	1,678	18.48%	9,083
Vermilion	18,383	47.80%	11,703	30.43%	8,162	21.22%	213	0.55%	6,680	17.37%	38,461
Wabash	2,436	39.04%	2,485	39.82%	1,302	20.87%	17	0.27%	-49	-0.78%	6,240
Warren	3,661	43.35%	3,325	39.37%	1,436	17.00%	24	0.28%	336	3.98%	8,446
Washington	2,986	39.52%	3,003	39.75%	1,542	20.41%	24	0.32%	-17	-0.23%	7,555
Wayne	3,332	37.56%	3,809	42.93%	1,702	19.18%	29	0.33%	-477	-5.37%	8,872
White	4,308	48.89%	3,057	34.70%	1,428	16.21%	18	0.20%	1,251	14.19%	8,811
Whiteside	12,329	45.41%	10,146	37.37%	4,589	16.90%	89	0.33%	2,183	8.04%	27,153
Will	59,633	39.20%	58,337	38.35%	32,788	21.55%	1,365	0.90%	1,296	0.85%	152,123
Williamson	14,361	49.93%	9,462	32.90%	4,779	16.62%	158	0.55%	4,899	17.03%	28,760
Winnebago	48,298	43.04%	42,221	37.63%	21,227	18.92%	469	0.42%	6,077	5.41%	112,215
Woodford	5,490	33.67%	8,032	49.26%	2,733	16.76%	50	0.31%	-2,542	-15.59%	16,305
Totals	2,453,350	48.58%	1,734,096	34.34%	840,515	16.64%	22,196	0.44%	719,254	14.24%	5,050,157

==== Counties that flipped from Republican to Democratic ====
- Bond
- Brown
- Bureau
- Champaign
- Clark
- Clay
- Clinton
- Coles
- Crawford
- Cumberland
- DeKalb
- Douglas
- Edgar
- Fayette
- Greene
- Hamilton
- Hardin
- Jasper
- Johnson
- Kankakee
- Lawrence
- Marion
- Marshall
- Mason
- Massac
- McDonough
- Monroe
- Moultrie
- Peoria
- Piatt
- Pope
- Richland
- Sangamon
- Schuyler
- Shelby
- Tazewell
- Union
- Warren
- White
- Whiteside
- Will
- Winnebago

== See also ==
- 1992 Illinois elections
- Presidency of Bill Clinton
- United States presidential elections in Illinois
