= 1974 Illinois elections =

- November 5, 1974
- Turnout: 52.23%

Elections were held in Illinois on Tuesday, November 5, 1974.

Primaries were held on March 19, 1974.

== Election information ==
1974 was a midterm election year in the United States.

=== Turnout ===
Turnout in the primary election was 30.09%, with a total of 1,817,804 ballots cast. 1,174,231 Democratic and 643,573 Republican primary ballots were cast.

Turnout during the general election was 52.23%, with 3,084,675 ballots cast.

== Federal elections ==
=== United States Senate ===
Incumbent Democrat Adlai Stevenson III was reelected.

=== United States House ===
All 24 Illinois seats in the United States House of Representatives were up for election in 1974.

The Democratic Party flipped three seats, leaving the party composition of Illinois' House delegation as 13 Democratic and 11 Republican.

== State elections ==
=== Treasurer ===
1974 Illinois State Treasurer election
- November 5, 1974
- Turnout: 47.05%
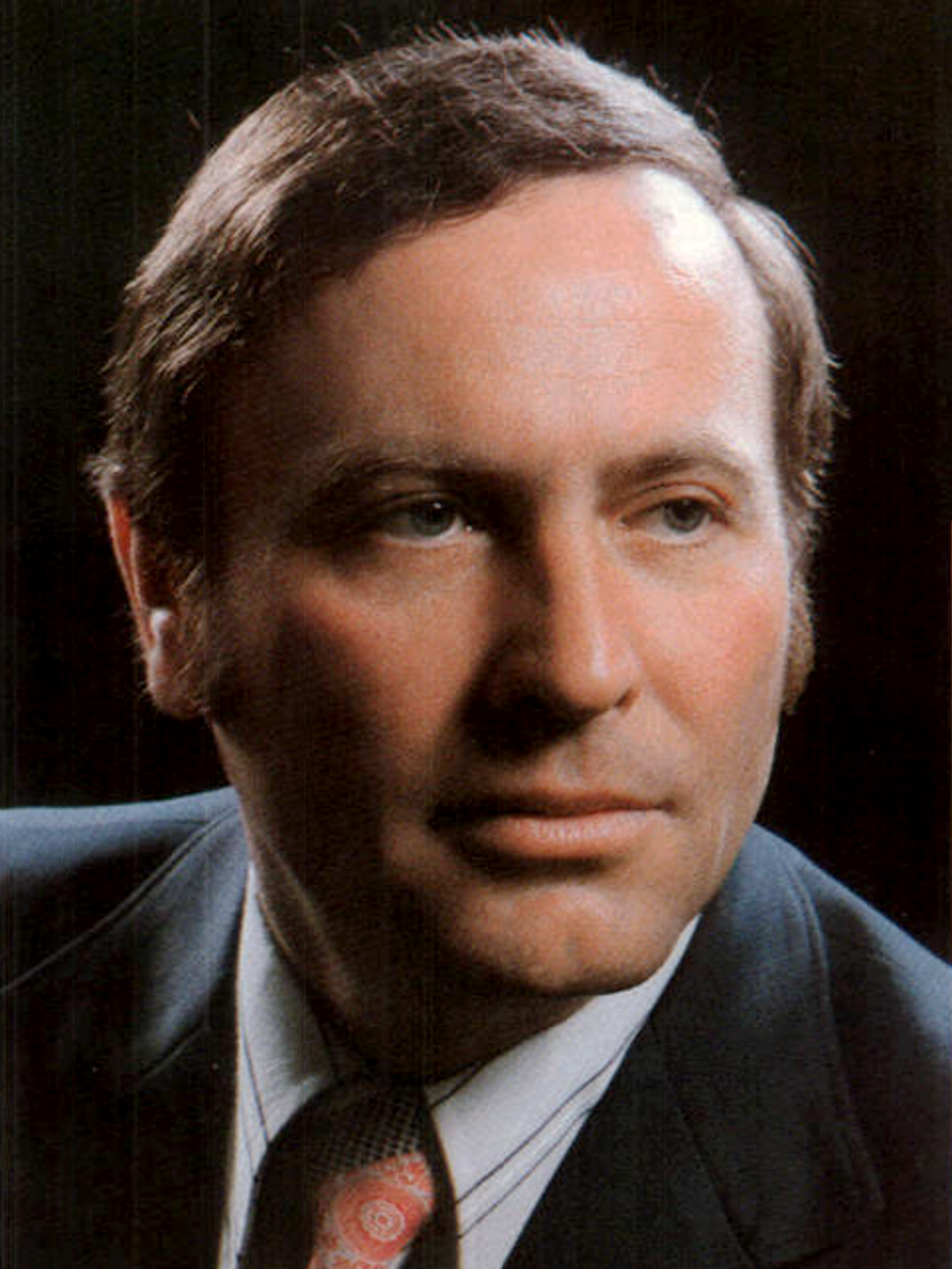

Nominee	Alan J. Dixon	Harry Page
Party	Democratic	Republican
Popular vote	1,796,144	953,928
Percentage	64.65%	34.33%
- County results Dixon: 40–50% 50–60% 60–70% 70–80% Page: 40–50% 50–60%
Treasurer before election
Alan J. Dixon
Democratic
Elected Treasurer
Alan J. Dixon
Democratic

Incumbent Treasurer Alan J. Dixon, a Democrat, won reelection to a second term.

==== Democratic primary ====
Incumbent Alan J. Dixon won renomination, running unopposed.

Treasurer Democratic primary
Party	Candidate	Votes	%
Democratic	Alan J. Dixon (incumbent)	721,536	100
Total votes		721,536	100

==== Republican primary ====
Harry Page defeated Jeannette H. Mullen in the Republican primary.

Treasurer Republican primary
Party	Candidate	Votes	%
Republican	Harry Page	267,307	53.06
Republican	Jeannette H. Mullen	236,441	46.94
Total votes		503,748	100

==== General election ====
Treasurer election
Party	Candidate	Votes	%
Democratic	Alan J. Dixon (incumbent)	1,796,144	64.65
Republican	Harry Page	953,928	34.33
Socialist Workers	Suzanne Haig	20,240	0.73
Communist	Lorraine M. Ashby	8,070	0.29
Total votes		2,778,382	100

=== State Senate ===
Seats in the Illinois Senate were up for election in 1974. Democrats flipped control of the chamber.

=== State House of Representatives ===
Seats in the Illinois House of Representatives were up for election in 1974. Democrats flipped control of the chamber.

=== Trustees of University of Illinois ===
1974 Trustees of University of Illinois election
- November 5, 1974

An election was held for three of nine seats for Trustees of University of Illinois system.

The election saw the election of new members, Democrats Robert J. Lenz, Nina T. Shepherd, and Arthur R. Velasquez.

First-term Republican Russel W. Steger, and fellow Republican Timothy W. Swain (who had been appointed in 1955, and had been elected to three full terms since) both lost reelection. Third-term Republican Earl M. Hughes was not renominated.

Trustees of the University of Illinois election
Party	Candidate	Votes	%
Democratic	Nina T. Shepherd	1,535,875	19.68
Democratic	Robert J. Lenz	1,409,944	18.06
Democratic	Arthur R. Velasquez	1,378,577	17.66
Republican	Timothy W. Swain (incumbent)	1,151,284	14.75
Republican	Russell W. Steger (incumbent)	1,107,032	14.18
Republican	Gardner W. Heidrick	1,042,875	13.36
Socialist Workers	Mary R. Wismer	50,752	0.65
Socialist Workers	Brian Williams	34,376	0.44
Socialist Workers	Antonio DeLeon	34,165	0.44
Communist	Valerie Witzkowski	27,006	0.35
Communist	John R. Lumpkin	17,256	0.22
Communist	Jay Schaffner	17,099	0.22
Total votes		7,806,241	100

=== Judicial elections ===
Multiple judicial positions were up for election in 1974.

=== Ballot measure ===
Illinois voters voted on a single ballot measure in 1974. In order to be approved, the measure required either 60% support among those specifically voting on the measure or 50% support among all ballots cast in the elections.

This marked the first time that Illinois voters voted on a proposed amendment to the 1970 Constitution of Illinois following its adoption.

==== Restrict Governor's Amendatory Veto Power Amendment ====
Voters rejected the Restrict Governor's Amendatory Veto Power Amendment, a measure which would have amended Amends Article IV, Section 9, Paragraph (e) of the Constitution of Illinois failed to meet either threshold to amend the constitution. It would have restricted the amendatory veto power given to the governor, which allows the governor to return bills to the legislature with suggested changes.

Restrict Governor's Amendatory Veto Power Amendment
Option	Votes	% of votes on referendum	% of all ballots cast
Yes	1,302,313	49.48	42.73
No	1,329,719	50.52	43.63
Total votes	2,632,032	100	85.33
Voter turnout	44.57%		

Amendment results by county No: 70–80%; 60–70%; 50–60%; Yes: 60–70%; 50–60%

== Local elections ==
Local elections were held.

Among the local elections was a referendum in Cook, DuPage, Kane, Lake, McHenry and Will counties which created Regional Transportation Authority.
