= Jim Thompson (Illinois politician) =

Governor of Illinois from 1977 to 1991

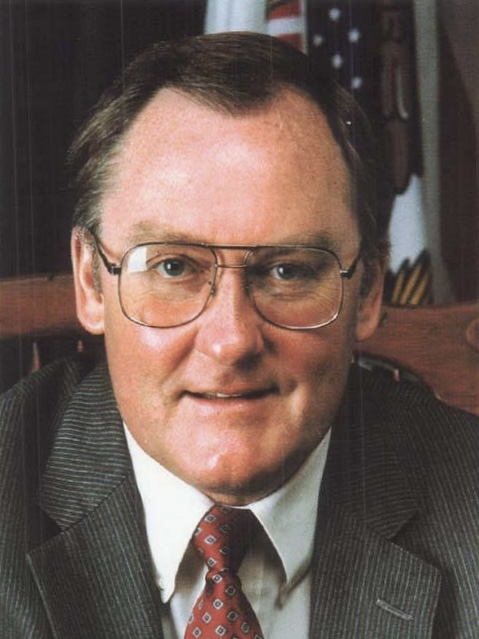
- Official portrait, c. 1987

Chair of the Intelligence Oversight Board
- In office February 26, 1990 – January 20, 1993
- President: George H. W. Bush
- Preceded by: W. Glenn Campbell
- Succeeded by: William Crowe

37th Governor of Illinois
- In office January 10, 1977 – January 14, 1991
- Lieutenant: Dave O'Neal; George Ryan
- Preceded by: Dan Walker
- Succeeded by: Jim Edgar

Chair of the National Governors Association
- In office August 2, 1983 – July 31, 1984
- Preceded by: Scott Matheson
- Succeeded by: John Carlin

United States Attorney for the Northern District of Illinois
- In office November 10, 1971 – June 30, 1975
- President: Richard Nixon; Gerald Ford
- Preceded by: William J. Bauer
- Succeeded by: Samuel K. Skinner

Personal details
- Born: James Robert Thompson Jr. May 8, 1936 Chicago, Illinois, U.S.
- Died: August 14, 2020 (aged 84) Chicago, Illinois, U.S.
- Party: Republican
- Spouse: Jayne Carr (m. 1976)
- Children: 1
- Education: University of Illinois Chicago (attended); Washington University (attended); Northwestern University (JD)

James Robert Thompson Jr. (May 8, 1936 – August 14, 2020) was an American politician and federal prosecutor who served as the 37th governor of Illinois from 1977 to 1991. He was Illinois's longest-serving governor, serving four consecutive terms over fourteen years.

A moderate Republican, he was the United States Attorney for the Northern District of Illinois during the early 1970s. As the U.S. Attorney, he tried and convicted several high-profile Illinois politicians, including former Democratic governor Otto Kerner Jr. Elected governor of Illinois in a landslide in 1976, he went on to win reelection three times, including in a historically close race against Adlai Stevenson III in 1982.

Following his tenure as governor, Thompson led a Chicago law firm for over a decade. In later years, Thompson served as a member of the 9/11 Commission, charged with investigating the September 11 attacks.

== Early life and education ==
Thompson was born on May 8, 1936 on Chicago's West Side, the son of Agnes Josephine (Swanson) and James Robert Thompson. Both of his parents were originally from rural DeKalb County, Illinois. His father, James, Sr., was a doctor who also worked as a pathologist at the Chicago Municipal Tuberculosis Sanitarium.

Through his father, he was of English and Scotch-Irish descent. His direct paternal ancestor, David Thompson, was an early American colonist who is widely considered the founder of New Hampshire. Through his mother, he was also of Swedish descent.

Thompson grew up in Chicago's Garfield Park and Galewood neighborhoods, graduating from North Park Academy. He first attended the University of Illinois Chicago, studying political science at the Navy Pier campus and serving on the student council. When his parents moved to St. Louis, Thompson subsequently transferred to Washington University in St. Louis. However, he never graduated and went on to receive his Juris Doctor degree from Northwestern University in 1959.

== Law career ==
Following law school, Thompson worked in the Cook County State's Attorney's office under Democrat Daniel P. Ward. While working there in the early 1960s, he fought against obsenity and pornography, such as by prosecuting comedian Lenny Bruce. He also argued two cases in front of the United States Supreme Court, including Escobedo v. Illinois. After leaving the State's Attorney's office in 1964, Thompson taught in the law school at Nothwestern University for five years.

In 1969, he joined the office of the United States Attorney for the Northern District of Illinois. Initially leading the criminal division for around a year, Thompson was subsequently appointed U.S. Attorney by President Richard Nixon following the resignation of William J. Bauer.

Serving from 1971 until 1975, he prosecuted around 350 Illinois public officials and their associates. During the early 1970s, he obtained a conviction against former governor Otto Kerner Jr. for his use of improper influence on behalf of the racetrack industry. He also tried and convicted many top aides of Chicago mayor Richard J. Daley, most notably Alderman Thomas E. Keane and County Clerk Matt Danaher, on various corruption charges. Prosecuting these prominent members of Chicago's Democratic political machine gave Thompson the celebrity that fueled his run for governor in 1976.

However, Thompson was bipartisan in his attacks on political corruption in Cook County and Chicago, pursuing not only high-profile Democrats, but also Republicans. Organized crime in Chicago was harder for his unit to crack and there were few notable cases during his tenure.

== Governor of Illinois ==
=== 1976 and 1978 election ===
In the 1976 election, Thompson won 65 percent of the vote over Democratic Secretary of State Michael Howlett, who had defeated incumbent governor Dan Walker in the primary and who had the support of Chicago Mayor and Cook County Democratic Party chairman Richard J. Daley.

Thompson was the first candidate for governor to receive over 3 million votes; his tally of 3,000,395 remains the largest number of votes ever cast for a candidate in an election for Governor of Illinois. His first term was for only two years because Illinois moved its gubernatorial election from presidential-election years to midterm-election years.

Thompson was re-elected to a full four-year term in 1978 with 60 percent of the vote, defeating State Comptroller Michael Bakalis. In 1982.

=== 1982 election ===
Thompson was re-elected to a full four-year term in 1978 with 60 percent of the vote, defeating State Comptroller Michael Bakalis. In 1982, Thompson was very narrowly re-elected over former U.S. Senator Adlai E. Stevenson III. Thompson won the contest by only 5,074 votes. It remains the closest gubernatorial race in Illinois history.

=== 1986 election ===
A rematch in 1986 was expected to be almost as close, but the Democrats were severely hamstrung when supporters of Lyndon LaRouche won the Democratic nominations for lieutenant governor and secretary of state. Stevenson refused to appear on the same ticket as the LaRouchites, and formed the Solidarity Party with the support of the regular state Democratic organization. With the Democrats badly split, Thompson skated to victory in the general election. Thompson was accused of hiding the sad shape that Illinois' economy and budget were in while campaigning, but once elected, called for an emergency session of the Illinois legislature to address the crisis.

=== Tenure ===
During his tenure, Thompson governed as a "Rockefeller Republican," often being called a moderate or liberal Republican. With the Chicago Sun-Times labeling him as a "master campaigner," Thompson was also known for his skill on the campaign trail during his four gubernatorial elections.

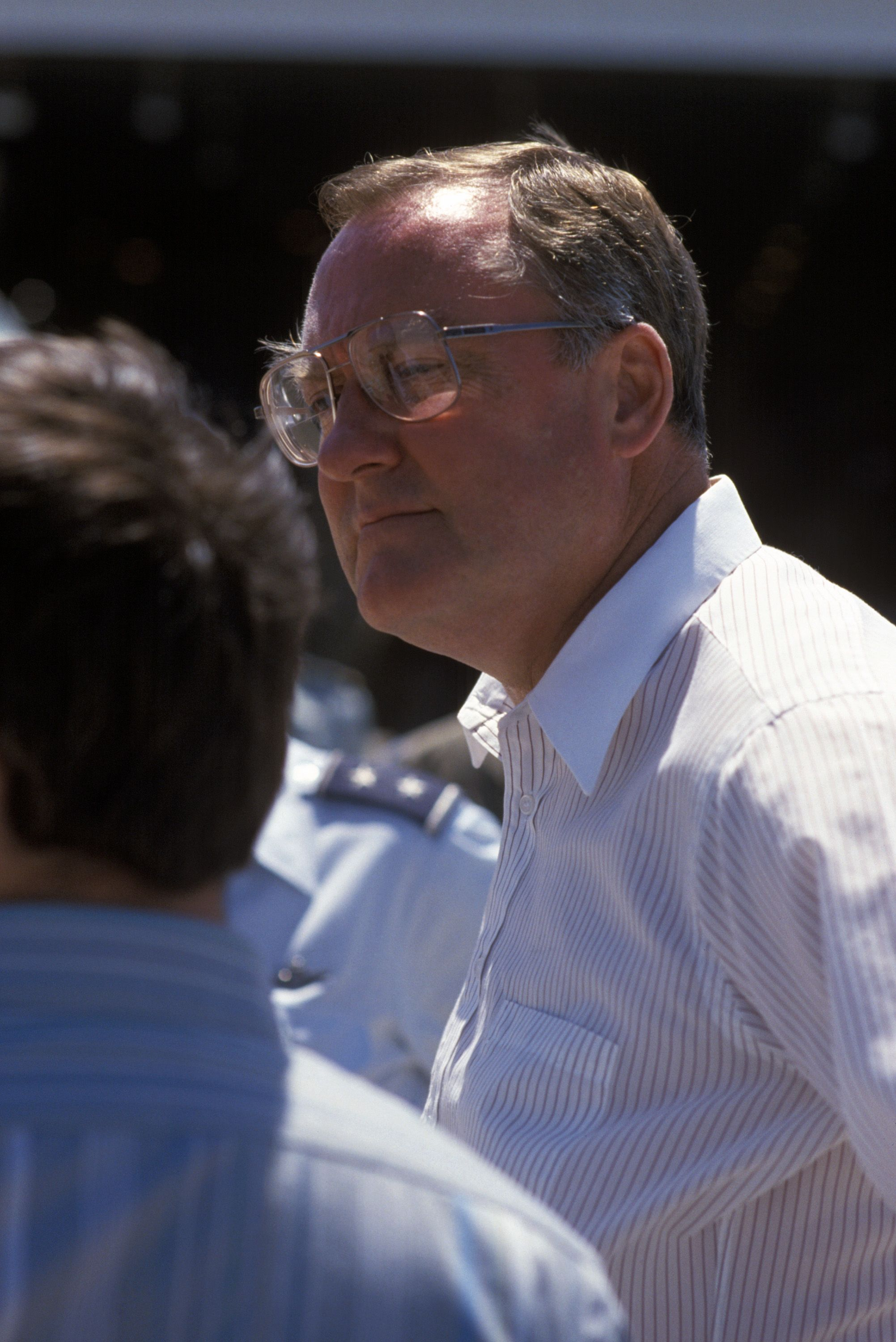
Governor Thompson observing a military exercise in July 1986

In November 1980, Thompson, by his executive order, instituted a hiring freeze for all state agencies, boards, bureaus, and commissions under his control as governor. The order affected approximately 60,000 state positions. These positions could only be filled if the candidates were first approved by an office created by Thompson, the Governor's Office of Personnel. Suit was brought and the Supreme Court held this political patronage practice unconstitutional as a violation of the First Amendment rights of low-level public employees in Rutan v. Republican Party of Illinois, 497 U.S. 62 (1990).

In 1989, Governor Thompson agreed to establish a compounding, 3 percent cost-of-living increase for retirees from Illinois government jobs, including public school teachers. Years later, in an interview with a Chicago business magazine, Thompson said he never knew the cost might exceed $1 billion and likely would not have signed it if he had known. The cumulative effect of the 3 percent annual increases has been recognized as one of the major causes of Illinois' ongoing public employee pension crisis.

Thompson was also credited for helping save the Chicago White Sox during his tenure. In 1988, Thompson convinced Illinois lawmakers to approve funding of a new stadium for the White Sox, who were threatening to move the club to St. Petersburg, Florida's newly built Suncoast Dome. Legislators ultimately approved a last-minute deal to build a new stadium on June 30, 1988, and new Comiskey Park opened in 1991.

After months of speculation and the prospect of tough reelection bid against Democrat Neil Hartigan, Thompson announced at a July 13, 1989 press conference that he would not seek a fifth term in 1990. His preferred successor, Secretary of State Jim Edgar, went on to win the race, serving two terms as governor.

=== Presidential and vice presidential speculations ===
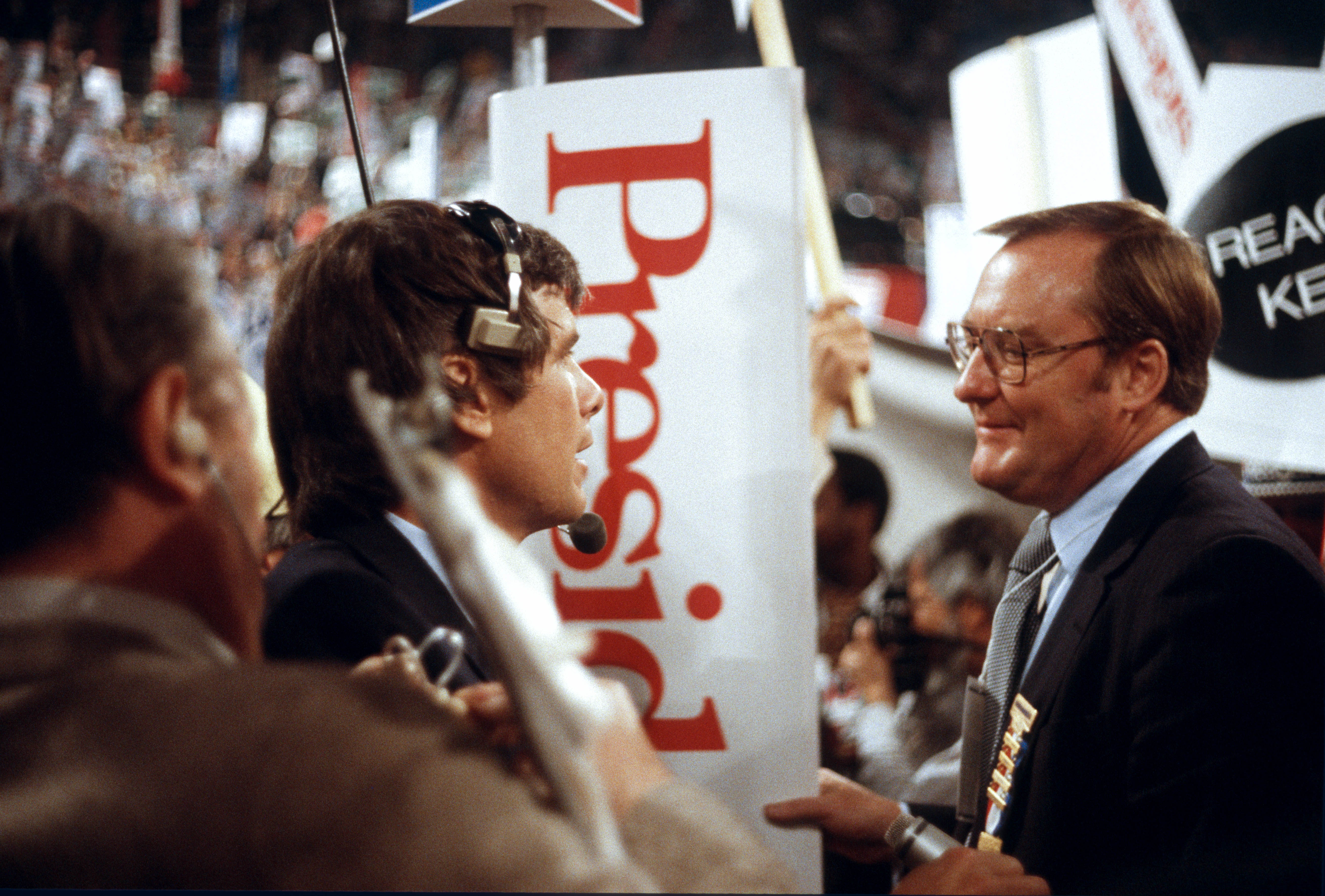
Thompson (right) being interviewed by reporters at the 1980 Republican National Convention

During his tenure, Thompson was mentioned as a potential future candidate for president or vice president. In 1978, The Washington Post declared that Thompson had "passed one test of a viable presidential candidate to oppose Jimmy Carter" in 1980. Thompson did not run for president, but was reportedly considered as a running mate for Republican nominee Ronald Reagan.

For several years, Thompson considered the possibility of making a run for the Republican presidential nomination in 1988. A Chicago Tribune report in 1988 concluded that Thompson had been very interested in serving as president, but felt that it was too soon for him to run in 1980 and unviable to run against incumbent vice president George H. W. Bush in 1988. He was approached for interest on the Bush ticket in 1988 but asked to be not considered, stating he had concern about "the effect of the campaign on his family." Thompson subsequently served as national co-chair of Bush's successful presidential bid.

=== Legal and lobbying career ===
After leaving public service, Thompson joined Winston & Strawn, a Chicago-based law firm. Thompson served as chairman of the executive committee from 1991 to 2006, and as chairman and CEO of the firm from 1993 to 2006. He remained senior chairman until January 31, 2015. As CEO of Winston & Strawn, he focused in the area of government relations and regulatory affairs.

When ex-Illinois Governor George Ryan, Thompson's former Lieutenant Governor, was facing federal charges related to the "Licenses-for-Bribes" scandal, Winston & Strawn represented Ryan pro bono. Thompson personally acted as Ryan's lawyer. On April 17, 2006, Ryan was convicted on all 18 counts, which included racketeering, misusing state resources for political gain, and fraud. He was sentenced to 6½ years in federal prison and began serving his sentence on November 7, 2007.

Thompson was also a director and head of the Audit Committee for Hollinger International, the media company founded by Conrad Black, which was the subject of a U.S. Securities and Exchange Commission investigation.

== Later career ==
In 2002, he was appointed by President George W. Bush to serve on the 9/11 Commission, where he aggressively questioned Richard Clarke, the former chief counter-terrorism adviser on the United States National Security Council. The commission's findings were released in the 9/11 Commission Report on July 22, 2004.

=== Death ===
After suffering from heart issues, Thompson died on August 14, 2020, at the age of 84.

In a tribute on Twitter, political consultant David Axelrod, who covered Thompson as a young journalist, described him as "one of the smartest and most formidable politicians I’ve ever known."

== Legacy ==
In 1993, the State of Illinois Center in Chicago was renamed the James R. Thompson Center in his honor.

Thompson was inducted as a laureate of The Lincoln Academy of Illinois and awarded the Order of Lincoln (the state's highest honor) by the governor of Illinois in 1991 in the area of Government.

In 2022, outside Rate Field, home of the Chicago White Sox, a bust of Thompson was errected to honor his 1988 effort to prevent the White Sox from moving. The base of the bust states, "Longest serving governor in Illinois history; 1977–1991; He kept the White Sox in Chicago."

== Sources ==
- Hartley, Robert E. (1979). Big Jim Thompson of Illinois. Rand McNally. ISBN 9780528818240.

Party political offices
Preceded by Richard Ogilvie	Republican nominee for Governor of Illinois; 1976, 1978, 1982, 1986	Succeeded by Jim Edgar
Preceded by John Dalton	Chair of the Republican Governors Association; 1981–1982	Succeeded by Robert Orr
Political offices
Preceded by Dan Walker	Governor of Illinois; 1977–1991	Succeeded by Jim Edgar
Preceded by Scott Matheson	Chair of the National Governors Association; 1983–1984	Succeeded by John Carlin
Government offices
Preceded by Glenn Campbell	Chair of the Intelligence Oversight Board; 1990–1993	Succeeded by William Crowe
