= Raymond Ewell =

American lawyer and legislator (1928–2022)

Raymond W. Ewell (born December 29, 1928 – October 28, 2022) was an American lawyer and state legislator in Illinois. He served in the Illinois House of Representatives from 1967-1983. He was a founding member of the Illinois Legislative Black Caucus.

He was born in Chicago. He graduated from Englewood High School in 1946 and received B.A. and M.A. degrees from the University of Illinois. He graduated from the University of Chicago Law School in 1954. He served in the military and ran a gas station before pursuing his legal career. He was involved with organizations including the YMCA and NAACP.
