= 1992 Illinois elections =

- November 3, 1992
- Turnout: 78.24%

Elections were held in Illinois on Tuesday, November 3, 1992.

Primary elections were held on March 17.

== Election information ==
=== Turnout ===
For the primaries, turnout was 43.68%, with 2,561,882 ballots cast (with 1,663,422 Democratic ballots, 878,438 Republican ballots, and 49,672 nonpartisan ballots cast).

For the general election, turnout was 78.24%, with 5,164,357 ballots cast.

=== Straight-ticket voting ===
Illinois had a straight-ticket voting option in 1992.

Party	Number of straight-ticket votes
Democratic	805,649
Republican	629,685
Conservative	4,748
Economic Recovery	9,485
Harold Washington	32,956
Independent Congressional	9,325
Independent Progressive	6
Libertarian	1,560
Louannee Peters	5,949
Natural Law	423
New Alliance Party	1,438
Populist	398
Socialist Workers	211

== Federal elections ==
=== United States President ===
Illinois voted for Democratic ticket of Bill Clinton and Al Gore.

This represented a realigning election for Illinois in regards to presidential politics. This was the first time since 1964 that Illinois voted for the Democratic ticket in a presidential election. This ended a streak of six consecutive elections in which the state had voted for the Republican ticket. It also began a streak that, as of the 2020 election, continues, in which the state has voted for the Democratic ticket in eight consecutive presidential elections.

=== United States Senate ===
Incumbent Democrat Alan J. Dixon was unseated, losing the Democratic primary to Carol Moseley Braun. Braun defeated Republican nominee Richard S. Williamson in the general election, becoming the first female African-American senator in United States history, as well as the first African-American elected to the United States Senate as a Democrat, and the first female senator elected from Illinois.

=== United States House ===
Illinois had lost two congressional seats in the reapportionment following the 1990 United States census. All 20 of Illinois’ remaining seats in the United States House of Representatives were up for election in 1992.

Before the election, Democrats held fifteen seats from Illinois, while Republicans held seven. In 1992, Democrats won twelve seats while Republicans won eight.

== State elections ==
=== State Senate ===
1992 Illinois Senate election
- November 3, 1992

All 59 seats in the Illinois Senate 30 seats needed for a majority
	Majority party	Minority party
Party	Republican	Democratic
Last election	28	31
Seats won	32	27
Seat change	▲4	▼4
- Results: Republican gain Democratic gain Republican hold Democratic hold
President before election
Philip J. Rock
Democratic
Elected President
James Philip
Republican

As this was the first election following redistricting, all of the seats of the Illinois Senate were up for election in 1992. Republicans flipped control of the Illinois Senate.

=== State House of Representatives ===
1992 Illinois House of Representatives election
- November 3, 1992

All 118 seats in the Illinois House of Representatives 60 seats needed for a majority
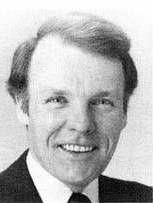

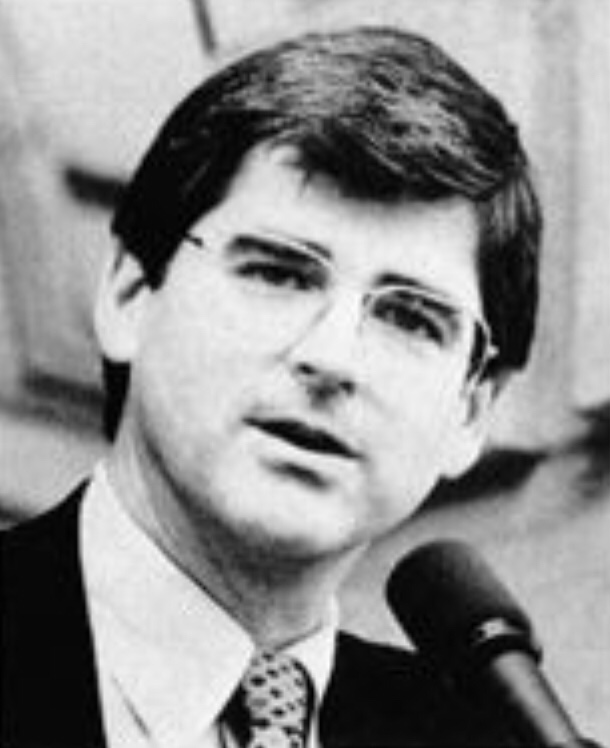
	Majority party	Minority party
Leader	Michael Madigan	Lee Daniels
Party	Democratic	Republican
Leader's seat	22nd	46th
Last election	72	46
Seats won	67	51
Seat change	▼5	▲5
- Results: Democratic gain Republican gain Democratic hold Republican hold
Speaker before election
Michael Madigan
Democratic
Speaker-Elect
Michael Madigan
Democratic

All of the seats in the Illinois House of Representatives were up for election in 1992. Democrats retained control of the Illinois House of Representatives.

=== Trustees of the University of Illinois ===
1992 Trustees of the University of Illinois election
- November 3, 1992

An election was held for three of nine seats for Trustees of University of Illinois system for six-year terms.

The election saw the reelection of incumbent Democrat Judith Calder to a second, as well as the election of new trustees, Democrats Jeff Gindorf and Ada Lopez.

Incumbent Republican Dave Downey, who had been appointed in 1991, lost reelection. Third-term incumbent Democrat Nina T. Shepherd was not nominated for reelection.

Trustees of the University of Illinois election
Party	Candidate	Votes	%
Democratic	Judith Calder (incumbent)	2,223,782	17.64
Democratic	Ada Lopez	2,138,085	16.96
Democratic	Jeff Gindorf	2,073,361	16.44
Republican	Dave Downey (incumbent)	1,796,907	14.25
Republican	Gayl Anne Simonds Pyatt	1,690,434	13.41
Republican	Craig Burkhardt	1,679,464	13.32
Libertarian	Katherine M. Kelley	113,393	0.90
Socialist Workers	Margaret Savage	80,755	0.64
New Alliance	Sandra Jackson-Opoku	74,680	0.57
Conservative	Barbara Mary Quirke	71,893	0.60
New Alliance	Bonita M. Bishop	65,450	0.52
Conservative	Ann M. Scheidler	65,275	0.52
Conservative	Hiram Crawford, Jr.	60,311	0.48
Natural Law	Judy Langston	59,823	0.48
Socialist Workers	Patricia Smith Chiloane	58,404	0.46
New Alliance	Stephen J. Jackson	54,008	0.43
Libertarian	Steven I. Givot	52,273	0.42
Natural Law	Merrill M. Becker	48,371	0.38
Libertarian	Michael R. Linksvayer	40,548	0.32
Natural Law	Lesia Wasylyk	38,474	0.31
Socialist Workers	John Votava	35,362	0.28
Populist	Thomas Nash	34,727	0.28
Populist	Irvin E. Thompson	33,158	0.26
Populist	Eldon Weder	19,850	0.16
Total votes		12,608,788	100

=== Judicial elections ===
Judicial elections were held.

=== Ballot measures ===
Illinois voters voted on a two ballot measures in 1992.

Two of the measures were legislatively referred constitutional amendments. In order to be approved, the legislatively referred constitutional amendments required either 60% support among those specifically voting on the amendment or 50% support among all ballots cast in the elections.

==== Crime Victim Rights Amendment ====
Voters approved the Crime Victim Rights Amendment (also known as "Amendment 1", a legislatively referred constitutional amendment which added Article I, Section 8.1 to the Constitution of Illinois. This guarantees crime victims certain rights, including the right to receive information about cases in which they are involved.

Crime Victim Rights Amendment
Option	Votes	% of votes on measure	% of all ballots cast
Yes	2,964,592	80.56	57.40
No	715,602	19.45	13.86
Total votes	3,680,194	100	71.26
Voter turnout	55.76%		

Amendment results by county Yes: 80–90%; 70–80%

==== Education Equality Amendment ====
The Education Equality Amendment (also known as "Amendment 2"), a legislatively referred constitutional amendment which would have amended of Article X, Section 1 of the Constitution of Illinois to mandate for equal opportunity in education, failed to meet either threshold to amend the constitution.

Education Equality Amendment
Option	Votes	% of votes on measure	% of all ballots cast
Yes	1,882,569	57.05	36.45
No	1,417,520	42.95	27.45
Total votes	3,300,089	100	63.90
Voter turnout	50.00%		

Amendment results by county Yes: 70–80%; 60–70%; 50–60%; No: 50–60%

=== Advisory referendums ===
==== Unfunded Mandates on Local Government referendum ====
An advisory referendum on unfunded mandates on local government was supported by voters.

Unfunded Mandates on Local Government referendum
Candidate	Votes	%
Yes	3,001,471	80.61
No	722,016	19.39
Total votes	3,723,487	100
Turnout	{{{votes}}}	56.41%

Referendum results by county Yes: 80–90%; 70–80%

== Local elections ==
Local elections were held. These included county elections, such as the Cook County elections.
