= Thomas J. Moran (judge) =

American judge

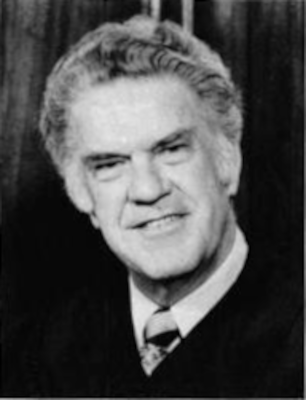
Moran's official photograph, c. 1987.

Thomas Joseph Moran (July 17, 1920 – September 14, 1995) was an American jurist who served as a justice of the Illinois Supreme Court from 1976 to 1992.

Born in Waukegan, Illinois, Moran served in the United States Coast Guard from July 1943 to June 1945. Moran then received his bachelor's degree from Lake Forest College in 1947 and his law degree from Chicago-Kent College of Law in 1950. He lived in Lake Forest, Illinois. Moran served as state's attorney for Lake County, Illinois, as probate judge and as circuit court judge for Lake County. From 1976 to 1992, Moran served on the Illinois Supreme Court and was chief justice of the supreme court. Moran died in a hospital in Lake Forest, Illinois.
