= Joseph H. Goldenhersh =

American judge

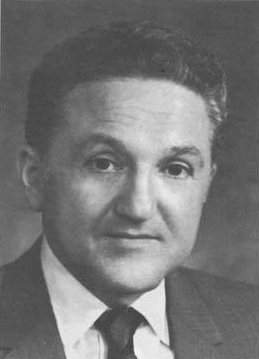
Goldenhersh's official photograph, c. 1973.

Joseph Herman Goldenhersh (November 2, 1914 – March 11, 1992) was an American jurist.

Born in East St. Louis, Illinois, Goldenhersh received his law degree from Washington University School of Law at Washington University in St. Louis and was admitted to the Illinois bar in 1936. He practiced law in East St. Louis, Illinois.

From 1964 until 1970, Goldenhersh served on the Illinois Appellate Court and was involved with the Democratic Party. Goldenhersh served on the Illinois Supreme Court from 1970 until his retirement in 1987. He served as chief justice of the court from 1979 to 1982.

Goldenhersh lived in Belleville, Illinois. He died in a hospital in St. Louis, Missouri from a stroke after undergoing open heart surgery.
