= Geoffrey Obrzut =

American politician

Member of the Illinois House of Representatives from the 52nd district
- In office January 1991 – January 1993
- Preceded by: Linda Williamson
- Succeeded by: Al Salvi

Personal details
- Born: May 16, 1952 (age 74) Elmhurst, Illinois
- Party: Democratic
- Education: Sangamon State University (BA)

Geofrey S. Obrzut (born May 16, 1952) was a Democratic member of the Illinois House of Representatives from 1991 to 1993. He graduated from West Leyden High School and earned his bachelor of arts from Sangamon State University. He served as a staffer to Governor James R. Thompson and to House Speaker Michael J. Madigan. He was assistant executive secretary of the Illinois Racing Board.

Obrzut was elected to the Board of Trustees for Triton College and served a single term from 1981-1987. In the 1990 election, he unseated fellow Northlake resident and Republican incumbent Linda Williamson. It was his third campaign against Williamson in the 52nd district. The 52nd district included portions of Berkeley, Northlake, River Grove, Melrose Park, Franklin Park, Schiller Park, and Rosemont. He served on the following committees; Aging; Constitutional Officers; Consumer Protection; Registration and Regulation; Transportation and Motor Vehicles; and Veterans Affairs.

He was defeated for reelection by Leyden Township Supervisor Angelo Saviano. In 2004, Obrzut became the President/CEO of the Illinois Community College Board. Obrzut retired from the position in 2013.
