= East Leyden High School =

Location
- 3400 Rose St. Franklin Park, Illinois 60131; United States; 41.9415°N 87.8668°W

Information
- School type: Public
- Motto: Educate Enrich Empower
- School district: Leyden H.S. Dist. 212
- Superintendent: Nick Polyak
- Principal: Dominic Manola
- Staff: 119.91 (FTE)
- Grades: 9–12
- Gender: co-ed
- Enrollment: 1,836 (2023–2024)
- Average class size: 19.6
- Student to teacher ratio: 15.31
- Campus: suburban
- Colours: blue gold
- Athletics conference: West Suburban Conference
- Nickname: Eagles
- Newspaper: HiLites
- Website: www.leyden212.org

East Leyden High School is a secondary school located in Franklin Park, Illinois (a suburb of Chicago) which educates grades 9–12.

Together with West Leyden High School in Northlake, Illinois, they serve the suburban communities in Franklin Park, Northlake, Rosemont, Schiller Park, River Grove, Melrose Park and unincorporated Leyden Township. Both are part Leyden High School District 212.

== History ==
The original school was opened in 1911 as a one-year school. It expanded to a three-year school two years later and it finally became a four-year high school in 1924, the year that the District began. The school was expanded many times until, in 1958, when a second campus was built in Northlake, known as West Leyden.

Due to a poor economy and less students being enrolled in the District, the two schools decided to combine athletic teams, starting in the 1981–82 school year. To this day, the schools still compete together as Leyden High School.

== Academics ==
East Leyden's class of 2008 had an average composite ACT score of 19.8, 0.7 points below the state average. 86.1% of the senior class graduated. East Leyden did not make Adequate Yearly Progress on the Prairie State Achievement Examination, which with the ACT comprises the state assessments used to fulfill the federal No Child Left Behind Act. Overall, the school did not achieve AYP in reading, and one student subgroup failed to meet expectations in reading and mathematics.

== Athletics ==
West Leyden and East Leyden have competed as a combined athletic program since the 1981–82 school year. The school competes in the West Suburban Conference. It is also a full member of the Illinois High School Association (IHSA), which governs most sports and competitive activities in Illinois. Teams are stylized as the "Eagles", with the IHSA referring to the combined program as "Franklin Park-Northlake (Leyden)".

The school sponsors interscholastic sports teams for young men and women in: basketball, cross country, golf, gymnastics, soccer, swimming and diving, tennis, track and field, and volleyball. Young men may also compete in baseball, football, and wrestling, while women may compete in badminton, bowling, cheerleading, and softball. While not sponsored by the IHSA, the Athletic Department also oversees a dance team for young women.

The following teams have finished in the top four of their respective IHSA sponsored state championship tournament or meet:

- Football: State Champions (1977)
- Wrestling: State Champions (1959–60, 1977–78)

== Notable alumni ==
- Brenda C. Barnes (class of 1971) was the president and CEO of Sara Lee Foods and former CEO (and first female head) of PepsiCo. As recently as 2006, Forbes magazine listed her as one of the ten most powerful women on Earth.
- Jonathan Cain (class of 1968) is a keyboardist and songwriter for the American rock band Journey.
- Ned Colletti (class of 1972) is a Major League Baseball executive who was general manager of the Los Angeles Dodgers.
- Tom Dore (class of 1975) is a former University of Missouri and professional basketball player who later became a broadcaster of the Chicago Bulls.
- Dan Galorath, chief architect of SEER-SEM project management software and CEO of Galorath Inc.
- Glen Grunwald is a former NBA executive. Formerly the general manager of the Toronto Raptors (1998–2004), he was a vice president for the New York Knicks.
- Harry "Chick" Jagade (1926–1968) (class of 1943), professional football player for the Colts, Browns, and Bears
- Bob Kruse former AFL football player. Played in Super Bowl for Oakland Raiders
- Jimmy Rodgers is a former basketball coach, most noted for being head coach of the Boston Celtics (1988–90) and Minnesota Timberwolves (1991–92).
- Mike Shanahan (class of 1970) is the former college and NFL coach, most notable for his years as head coach of the Denver Broncos, whom he led to the championship of Super Bowl XXXII and Super Bowl XXXIII.
- Craig Wilson (class of 1988) was a Major League Baseball infielder (1998–2000), playing for the Chicago White Sox. He was also a member of the 1992 team which participated in the 1992 Summer Olympics.

== Notable staff ==
- Charles Farina was the school's wrestling coach (1954–90) and was elected into the National Federation of State High School Associations Hall of Fame in 1987. His 592 wins and nine undefeated seasons at Leyden are Illinois records for a single high school.
- Jerry Wainwright was the assistant basketball coach at Leyden (1975–78). In 2005, he became the head coach for the men's basketball team at DePaul University and is now director of basketball operations for Marquette.
