= West Leyden High School =

Location
- 1000 Wolf Rd. Northlake, Illinois 60164; United States
- 41.927°N 87.9064°W

Information
- School type: Public
- Motto: Educate Enrich Empower
- Opened: 1959
- School district: Leyden H.S. Dist. 212
- Superintendent: Nick Polyak
- Principal: Arturo Sentoro
- Staff: 117.24 (FTE)
- Grades: 9–12
- Gender: Co-ed
- Enrollment: 1,687 (2024-2025)
- Average class size: 18.4
- Student to teacher ratio: 14.39
- Campus: Suburban
- Colours: blue gold
- Slogan: LeydenPride
- Athletics conference: West Suburban Conference
- Mascot: Eagle
- Nickname: Eagles
- Accreditation: AdvancED
- Newspaper: Lancer
- Website: www.leyden212.org

West Leyden High School is a high school in Northlake, Illinois, United States. It first opened for enrollment in 1959. The school's athletic mascot was originally the Knights until 1981, when the East and West Leyden High School athletic programs merged to create an athletic team currently known as the Eagles.

Together with East Leyden High School in Franklin Park, Illinois, it comprises Leyden High School District 212 of the suburban communities in Franklin Park, Northlake, Rosemont, Schiller Park, River Grove, Melrose Park and unincorporated Leyden Township.

== Academics ==
West Leyden's class of 2008 had a below average composite ACT score of points below the state average. West Leyden did not make Adequate Yearly Progress on the Prairie State Achievement Examination, which with the ACT comprises the state assessments used to fulfill the federal No Child Left Behind Act. Overall, the school did not achieve AYP in reading or mathematics, while two of its three student subgroups failed to meet expectations in mathematics.

== Student life ==
=== Athletics ===
Since 1981, West Leyden and East Leyden have had a combined athletics program. Prior to the schools unifying into a single program, West Leyden's teams were stylized as the Knights, and the school colors were blue and gold. While East Leyden's team nickname of "Eagles" was retained for the combined program, West Leyden's colors became the colors for the unified program.

As a separate team, the only team to finish in the top four of their respective Illinois High School Association (IHSA) was the 1968—69 wrestling team.

In 2014, 15-year-old student Brody Roybal won the gold medal with the American team in the 2014 Winter Paralympics. He won a gold medal again at the 2018 Winter Paralympics, this time as a 19-year-old.

=== Fine arts ===
The Leyden fine arts program includes music, art, and theatre. The music department features several ensembles, including choral groups and instrumental orchestras, which have participated in regional, state, and national competitions. Choral students have taken part in the Illinois Music Educators Association competitions in both jazz and classical categories. The Leyden Chamber Singers perform annually at the Madrigal Dinner event. The marching band has performed in locations such as Pennsylvania and Florida.

== Incidents ==
On May 3, 1967, 18-year-old dropout Michael Pisarski killed his former girlfriend, 17-year-old Christine Mitchell, inside the high school. The school's athletic director was also wounded. Pisarski was sentenced to a minimum of 35 years to a maximum of 60 years in prison, with 4–5 years to be served concurrently for the aggravated battery of the athletic director.

In September 2019, threats of shooting were made on social media. This led to East Leyden High School and West Leyden High School having classes online for a day.

At least one child was forced to undergo a 72 hour hold after the school stalked multiple students' social media accounts. The parents of these students were not notified, and all power of attorney was illegally moved to the state during this time.

== Notable people ==
- Tom Dore, play-by-play announcer known for his long association with the Chicago Bulls; Dore attended West Leyden before transferring to and graduating from East Leyden
- Manny Flores, Chicago City Council member from the 1st ward; graduated from West Leyden
- Tom Rooney, Republican member of the Illinois Senate; has taught U.S. history at West Leyden for over 20 years
- Rick Heidner (Class of 1977) – Entrepreneur, politician and real estate developer; recipient of the Leyden District 212 Wall of Fame award.
- Frankie Sullivan, lead guitarist in Survivor, a band formed with fellow Leyden alumni Rick Weigand in 1978; nominated for an Academy Award in 1982, in the category Best Original Song for co-writing "Eye of the Tiger" from the film Rocky III
- Mark Venturini, actor, Friday the 13th: A New Beginning, Return of the Living Dead
