= West Suburban Conference =

High school athletic league in Illinois, USA

- Formerly: West Suburban League
- Conference: IHSA
- Founded: 1924
- Sports fielded: 26 (13 boys', 13 girls')
- No. of teams: 14
- Headquarters: Illinois
- Region: Chicagoland, Illinois (DuPage and Cook counties)

The West Suburban Conference is an athletic conference in DuPage County and Cook County in the state of Illinois. The conference was founded in 1924.

== Member schools ==
All of the schools are also members of the Illinois High School Association (IHSA). The conference is divided into two divisions.

=== Gold Division ===
School	Town	Nickname	Enrollment
Addison Trail High School	Addison, Illinois	Blazers	1,902 (2023)
Downers Grove South High School	Downers Grove, Illinois	Mustangs	2,712 (2023)
Hinsdale South High School	Darien, Illinois	Hornets	1,315 (2023)
Leyden High Schools^{1}	Franklin Park, Illinois	Eagles	3,406.5 (2023)
Morton High Schools^{2}	Cicero, Illinois	Mustangs	7,758.5 (2023)
Proviso East High School	Maywood, Illinois	Pirates	2,001 (2023)
Willowbrook High School	Villa Park, Illinois	Warriors	1,868 (2023)

=== Silver Division ===
School	Town	Nickname	Enrollment
Downers Grove North High School	Downers Grove, Illinois	Trojans	2,156 (2023)
Glenbard West High School	Glen Ellyn, Illinois	Hilltoppers	2,322 (2023)
Hinsdale Central High School	Hinsdale, Illinois	Red Devils	2,528 (2023)
Lyons Township High School^{3}	La Grange, Illinois	Lions	3,947 (2023)
Oak Park and River Forest High School	Oak Park, Illinois	Huskies	3,346.5 (2023)
Proviso West High School	Hillside, Illinois	Panthers	2,268.5 (2023)
York Community High School	Elmhurst, Illinois	Dukes	2,789.5 (2023)

== History ==
The West Suburban Conference is the fourth oldest Illinois League that is in existence today. It was formed in the winter of 1924 and was the direct successor league of the DuPage County Conference that expired the previous year. Old DuPage County members Hinsdale, Glenbard, York, Downers Grove, and West Chicago, joined with Maine to form a new league. In 1928, Riverside (now Riverside-Brookfield) left the disintegrating old Suburban League and joined the West Suburban League.

As the western suburbs grew during the 1920s the schools grew in size. In 1935, Lyons Township (LaGrange) joined the league, and the following year West Chicago dropped out.

The league membership stayed stable until 1951, when Arlington joined the league. When it withdrew from the conference in 1966, Proviso West took its place. In 1972, charter member Maine East (which began as Maine) left the league. When the Suburban League broke up in the spring of 1975, two of those league members, Oak Park River Forest and Proviso East (which began as Proviso), joined the West Suburban League the following fall. In 1982, Riverside-Brookfield, with a declining enrollment that made the school increasingly noncompetitive, left the league.

The biggest change in the history of WSC occurred in the spring of 1986 with a major re-alignment. This took place between the conference and the Des Plaines Valley League with a vote of the Superintendents from the Inter-Suburban Association. This action combined the two leagues under one umbrella conference. The old West Suburban Conference became the Silver Division, and the DesPlaines Valley League became the Gold Division. Together the two divisions form the West Suburban Conference. In this reorganization Proviso East moved into the Gold Division. Each Division had seven teams. According to WSC folklore, the division names were finalized after many hours of deliberation, arguing and negotiation. Their final names were not arrived at with the intention of ranking one ahead of the other, but came from the color of hair of the athletic directors in each division. The Silver Division's athletic directors were primarily distinguished gray-haired professionals who all happened to have "silver hair locks", thus securing the name. Competition in the reorganized league began in the fall of 1986.

== Notes ==
1. Leyden High Schools is a unified team of East Leyden High School in Franklin Park, Illinois and West Leyden High School in Northlake, Illinois.
2. Morton High Schools is a unified team which draws its students from the three campuses of J. Sterling Morton High School District 201 that are located in Berwyn, Illinois (Morton West) and Cicero, Illinois (Morton East).
3. Lyons Township High School is a unified team which draws its players from two campuses that are located in La Grange, Illinois (Lyons Township High School - North Campus for Juniors and Seniors) and Western Springs, Illinois (Lyons Township High School - South Campus for Freshmen and Sophomores)
