= Bob Kruse =

American football player (born 1942)

No. 62, 63
- Positions: Guard, Tackle

Personal information
- Born: February 10, 1942 (age 84); Franklin Park, Illinois, U.S.
- Listed height: 6 ft 2 in (1.88 m)
- Listed weight: 259 lb (117 kg)

Career information
- High school: East Leyden (Franklin Park)
- College: Colorado State; Wayne State (NE)
- NFL draft: 1967: 12th round, 306th overall pick

Career history
- Oakland Raiders (1967-1968); Buffalo Bills (1969)

Awards and highlights
- AFL champion (1967)

Career AFL statistics
- Games played: 28
- Stats at Pro Football Reference

Robert Anthony Kruse (born February 10, 1942) is an American former professional football player who was a guard and tackle in the American Football League (AFL). He played college football for the Colorado State Rams and Wayne State Wildcats. He played in the AFL for the Oakland Raiders from 1967 to 1968 and for the Buffalo Bills in 1969.
