= Ned Colletti =

American sports executive

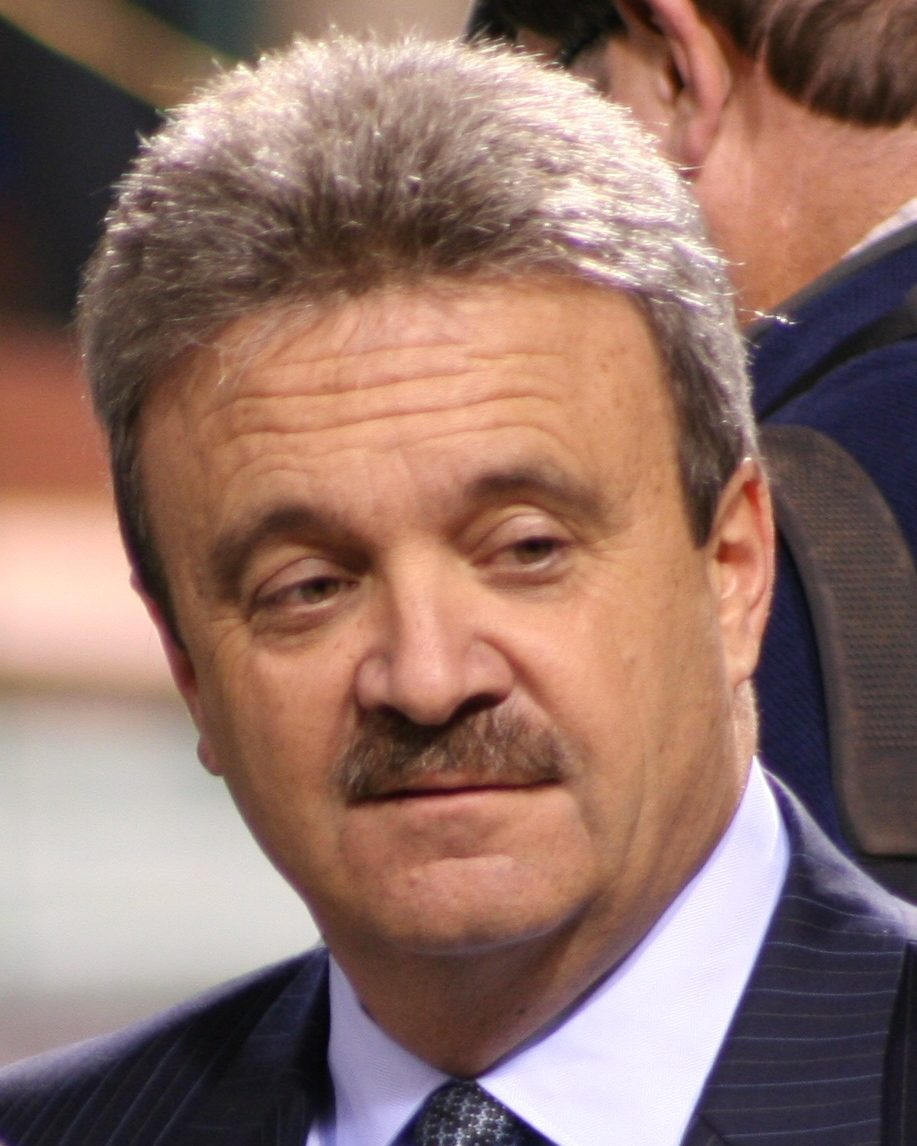
- Born: Chicago, Illinois, U.S.
- Education: Northern Illinois University
- Occupations: Sports executive Professor; NHL scout
- Years active: 1982–present
- Employer(s): Los Angeles Dodgers; Pepperdine University; San Jose Sharks
- Website: Official Profile

Ned Louis Colletti Jr. is an American sports executive with 40 years experience in Major League Baseball and nearly 50 seasons in professional sports, including the last eight years in the National Hockey League with the San Jose Sharks. Colletti is a four-time Emmy Award-winning baseball analyst, a professor of Sports Administration at Pepperdine University and the author of the best-selling book The Big Chair. He was general manager of the Los Angeles Dodgers from 2006 through 2014. Before moving to the Dodgers, he was assistant general manager of the San Francisco Giants. Colletti is one of very few American sports executives to work in two major sports: Major League Baseball and the National Hockey League.

In January, 2025, he was named General Manager of Team Italy for the 2026 World Baseball Classic. Team Italy

Colletti graduated from East Leyden High School in Franklin Park, Illinois, and attended Triton College before graduating from Northern Illinois University. He was inducted into the Triton College Sports Hall of Fame in 1993, the same year as Major League players Kirby Puckett, Lance Johnson, and Jeff Reboulet. In 2015, he was inducted into the National Italian American Sports Hall of Fame. In 2021, he was inducted into the Chicago Sports Hall of Fame.

== Early career ==
In 1982, Colletti began his Major League career with the Chicago Cubs. He was a member of the front office when the Cubs won the National League East in 1984 and 1989. Colletti was honored with Major League Baseball's Robert O. Fishel Award for Public Relations Excellence in 1990.

Colletti left the Cubs and joined the front office of the San Francisco Giants in 1994 as director of baseball operations. He was promoted to assistant general manager in October 1996. During his tenure, the Giants had an 813–644 overall record (.558), winning an average of 90.3 games per season. He was hired by the Los Angeles Dodgers in 2005.

== Career with the Dodgers ==
Colletti became the 10th general manager in Los Angeles Dodgers history and the fifth in eight years when he was hired on November 16, 2005.

The Dodgers made the playoffs in five of his nine seasons from 2006–14. Only once in Colletti's nine seasons did the Dodgers have a losing record. Los Angeles went to the NL Division Series in Colletti's first season in 2006 and reached the National League Championship Series in 2008, 2009, and 2013. The back-to-back appearances in 2008–09 marked the first time the Dodgers had reached the NLCS in consecutive years since 1977–78. The Dodgers won 15 playoff games from 1989–2014. Fourteen of those playoff wins came under Colletti. The only other Dodger postseason win in that period came in the 2004 NL Division Series under then-GM Paul DePodesta.

During six of Colletti's nine seasons, the Dodgers set home attendance records. The Dodgers averaged 3,606,151 fans per season in Colletti's nine seasons with the Dodgers. The Dodgers led all of Major League Baseball in home and road attendance in 2013 and led, again, in home attendance in 2014 with 3,782,337 fans.

In 2010, under Colletti's leadership, the Dodgers were named Topps Organization of the Year, an honor presented annually to the Major League franchise that has shown most-outstanding performance, depth and talent among its Major and Minor League teams.

In the nine seasons from the start of Colletti's career as general manager through 2014, the Dodgers had a 783–674 (.537) record—the third-best record in the National League. Only the Cardinals (.542) and Phillies (.538) were better. Among NL West teams, the Dodgers' record during that stretch was 40 games better than second-best San Francisco Giants.

Colletti reached 750 wins as a general manager on July 29, 2014, when the Dodgers defeated the Atlanta Braves 3–2 in 10 innings at Dodger Stadium before a crowd of 47,386. Only Buzzie Bavasi reached the 750-win mark faster in Dodger history. His 783 wins from 2006–14 were most among all National League general managers.

From June to December 2012, Colletti, with the backing of a new, aggressive ownership team led by Dodgers' president Stan Kasten, owners Mark Walter, Earvin "Magic" Johnson, Peter Guber, and Guggenheim Baseball Management, spent more than $600 million to bring a parade of all-star players and prospects to Los Angeles. The wholesale makeover began in late June when the Dodgers spent $42 million to sign 21-year-old Cuban prospect Yasiel Puig to a six-year deal. On July 25, Colletti brought in former National League batting champion Hanley Ramírez as the key to a four-player trade with the Miami Marlins.

On August 25, 2012, with the Dodgers three games behind the Giants in the National League West and 1½ games out of the final wild card spot, Colletti completed a nine-player trade that the Los Angeles Times called a "block-buster" and a "stunning development". Key to the deal was the acquisition of four-time All-Star first baseman Adrián González from the Boston Red Sox. But the Dodgers also obtained the four-time All-Star outfielder Carl Crawford, three-time All-Star pitcher Josh Beckett, and switch-hitting utility infielder Nick Punto. The Red Sox received first baseman James Loney and four prospects, including infielder Iván DeJesús Jr. and pitcher Allen Webster. The Boston Globe's Dan Shaughnessy called it "the biggest Red Sox trade since Babe Ruth was dealt to the Yankees for cash in 1920".

After ending the season 86–76, but failing to make the playoffs, the Dodgers were active on the free-agent market, signing starting pitchers Zack Greinke, a former Cy Young winner, and Ryu Hyun-jin, who had been an All-Star in each of his seven seasons in the Korea Baseball Organization from 2006–12. Greinke, who won the Cy Young with Kansas City in 2009, provided the Dodgers with what MLB.com called "unprecedented starting pitching depth."

On October 14, 2014, he was removed from his position as general manager of the Dodgers after the Dodgers failed to advance to the World Series despite a 2014 opening day payroll more than $30 million higher than any other MLB team, and $55 million higher than any other National League team. Colletti remained with the team in a new position as senior adviser to the president.

Following his tenure as the Dodgers' GM, Colletti became a baseball analyst on SportsNet LA, a professor of Sports Management at Pepperdine University, a professional scout for the San Jose Sharks and released a memoir.

== Combined career as AGM and GM ==
Colletti was a top front office executive – either an assistant general manager (AGM) or general manager (GM) – continuously from 1997 until 2014 with two clubs, the San Francisco Giants and Los Angeles Dodgers. Only five other GMs served continuously, either as an AGM or a GM, from 1997–2014. Of the six GMs who served continuously for those 18 seasons as assistant general manager or general manager, only Brian Cashman of the New York Yankees had a higher winning percentage.

In his last 24 seasons as an executive, Colletti built or helped to build teams that qualified for the postseason 15 times (with five other teams eliminated in the final game or two of the season), made 7 NLCS appearances, and appeared in four World Series, winning one World Series with a combined record of 2124-1701 (423 games over .500). During his time with the Dodgers, he and his staff drafted or signed players who won 3 Cy Young Awards, plus three runners-up; 2 Most Valuable Player Awards, plus one runner-up; two National League Rookies of the Year, two NLCS Most Valuable Players and one World Series Most Valuable Player.

== General Manager of Team Italy ==
Colletti was appointed the General Manager of Team Italy in January, 2025, 13 months before the 2026 World Baseball Classic tournament began.

Team Italy had unprecedented success going undefeated in pool play (defeating Brazil, Great Britain, USA and Mexico) and then qualified for the semi-finals for the first time in the 20-year history of the WBC by defeating Puerto Rico.

Italy’s only defeat came in the semifinal game versus eventual champion Venezuela. The victory over the USA, Mexico and Puerto Rico were considered the most dynamic and historic victories in the long history of baseball in Italy.

Italian Prime Minister Giorgia Meloni mentioned Team Italy’s upset for the heavily favored Team USA in an address the following morning to the Italian Parliament.

Besides veteran players Vinnie Pasquantino, Jon Berti, Aaron Nola, Michael Lorenzen and Adam Ottavino, the roster included many players who had not yet played a season in Major League Baseball as well as players who were born in Italy and had not played professionally in the United States.

== San Jose Sharks ==
On September 6, 2019, the San Jose Sharks announced Colletti would join the team as a scout at the National Hockey League and American Hockey League levels. Besides pro scouting, Colletti assists the coaching staffs with player and people development.

== Teaching career at Pepperdine University ==
Colletti began teaching at Pepperdine University during the spring semester of 2017 and has taught more than 20 semesters of Sports Administration/ Leadership classes, including four semesters in the school's London, England program. The classes center on leadership and culture building in sports; the globalization of sport; sports and the media; and sport contract and trade negotiations.

After graduating from high school, Colletti was not accepted at any four-year universities; lacking the grades and the finances to attend.

He was awarded with an Honorary Doctorate Degree in Humane Letters in 2023-an honor he considers to be the greatest of his career. Pepperdine Faculty

== Charity and community work ==
Colletti is active in several community and charity efforts in Los Angeles.

He and the Dodgers have partnered with Guide Dogs of America to sponsor lifelong working partners for the visually impaired. In October 2011, Colletti joined radio personality Peter Tilden and Colletti's friends from the band Chicago, who played a benefit concert that raised funds for Guide Dogs of America and the Foundation for Fighting Blindness.

Colletti received a prestigious Humanitarian Award from A Place Called Home, located in South Central Los Angeles, which provides at-risk youth with a secure, positive environment. The Los Angeles City College Foundation also honored Colletti for his work with youth. On October 23, 2012, the Los Angeles City College Foundation honored Colletti for his work with youth.

Vicki Santo, widow of Chicago Cubs Hall of Fame legend Ron Santo, and Colletti established a foundation, RonSantoFoundation.com, to place service dogs with people suffering from diabetes. The foundation's 45 dogs are trained to alert their human partners when their blood sugar is low, helping prevent sudden, unexpected onsets of hypoglycemia that can be devastating.

Colletti also serves on the advisory board of Get Lit–Words Ignite, a non-profit organization committed to providing Los Angeles children with opportunities to develop an appreciation for literature, writing, reading and poetry. From 2011 to 2013, actors Tim Robbins and Helen Mirren worked with Colletti to raise more than $100,000 for the organization.

As a California Advisory Board member of Vision To Learn, Colletti works with the organization founded by Austin Beutner to provide eye examinations and free glasses to under-served, urban youth in some of the hardest-to-reach communities. In its 13 years of existence, Vision To Learn has screened more than 2M children in 14 states (and Washington, D.C.), providing nearly 500,000 students with eye exams and more than 350,000 with free eye glasses.

Sporting positions
Preceded by Paul DePodesta	Los Angeles Dodgers General Manager; 2005–2014	Succeeded by Farhan Zaidi
