= Linda Williamson =

American politician

Member of the Illinois House of Representatives from the 52nd district
- In office January 9, 1985 – January 13, 1991
- Preceded by: Eugene C. Doyle
- Succeeded by: Geoffrey Obrzut

Personal details
- Born: November 11, 1952 (age 73)
- Party: Republican
- Education: Triton College

Linda-Jean M. Williamson (born November 11, 1952) was an American politician.

Born in Chicago, Illinois, Williamson studied political science at Triton College. She served on the board of trustees for Leyden Township, Cook County, Illinois. She lived in Northlake, Illinois. From 1985 to 1991, Williamson served in the Illinois House of Representatives and was a Republican. She was defeated by fellow Northlake resident Geoffrey Obrzut.
