= Leyden High School District 212 =

School district in Illinois, United States

Leyden District 212

Location
- Franklin Park, IL; USA

District information
- Type: High Schools
- Motto: Educate Enrich Empower
- Established: 1913

Students and staff
- Students: 3,339
- District mascot: Eagle

Other information
- Website: www.leyden212.org

The Leyden High School District 212 operates two high schools (9–12) in Leyden Township (Cook County, Illinois, USA), named after Leiden (Netherlands). The schools have 215 teachers (FTEs) serving 3,339 students.

== History ==
In 1913, the first Leyden was originally a two-year high school which is now present day Hester Junior High School in Franklin Park. It became a four-year high school in 1924 where it was known as Cook County District 212. With increase in population, the East Leyden building was expanded and finished by 1955. West Leyden was built and finished by 1959. In 1965, West Leyden housed Triton Junior College until its buildings were constructed in River Grove by 1969. By 2009, East Leyden purchased 12 acres for parking lot and field expansion.

== Organization and Staff ==
It is governed by a 9-member school board. The president of the board is Mr. Gregory T. Ignoffo. Dr. Nick Polyak serves as the current superintendent over the district since 2013.

== Athletics ==
Each sport is offered to all students at both schools, but some are practiced at only one location.

- Bowling
- Boys Baseball
- Boys Basketball
- Boys Cross Country
- Boys Football
- Golf
- Boys Soccer
- Swimming
- Boys Tennis
- Boys Track & Field
- Boys Volleyball
- Boys Wrestling
- Badminton
- Girls Basketball
- Cheerleading
- Girls Cross Country
- Girls Gymnastics
- Leydenettes
- Girls Soccer
- Softball
- Girls Tennis
- Girls Track & Field
- Girls Volleyball

School name	City	Students	FTE Teachers	Pupil/Teacher Ratio
East Leyden High School	Franklin Park, Illinois	1825	120	17:1
West Leyden High School	Northlake, Illinois	1669	117	19:1

Note: Based on 2023 school year data
