= Glen Grunwald =

American-Canadian attorney and basketball executive

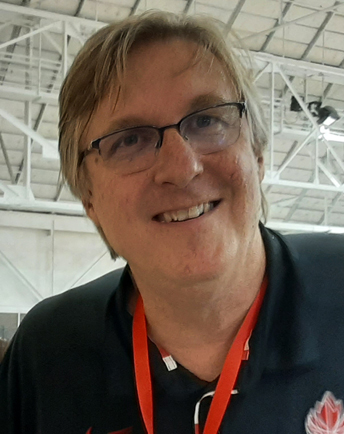
- Grunwald in 2022

Personal information
- Born: June 13, 1958 (age 68) Chicago, Illinois, U.S.
- Listed height: 6 ft 9 in (2.06 m)
- Listed weight: 207 lb (94 kg)

Career information
- High school: East Leyden (Franklin Park, Illinois)
- College: Indiana (1976–1981)
- NBA draft: 1981: 5th round, 115th overall pick
- Drafted by: Boston Celtics
- Position: Forward

Career highlights
- NCAA champion (1981); First-team Parade All-American (1976); Second-team Parade All-American (1975)
- Stats at Basketball Reference

Glen Grunwald (born June 13, 1958) is an American attorney and basketball executive who serves as the executive advisor of Canada Basketball and as a senior advisor of the Memphis Grizzlies.

He previously served as president and CEO of Canada Basketball and as general manager of the Toronto Raptors and New York Knicks of the NBA.

== Early life ==
Born in Chicago, Illinois, Grunwald was a high-school All-American basketball player from East Leyden High School in Franklin Park, Illinois. He is the only player selected All-Chicago area four times, and was player of the year in the state his senior year, 1976. He was injured prior to his freshman year at Indiana University, and although he was a team captain in 1981 when Indiana won the national title, and was drafted by the Boston Celtics in the 5th round of the NBA draft, he never played professional basketball.

Grunwald returned to college, earning a J.D. at Northwestern University School of Law, and an MBA from Indiana University.

== NBA ==
=== Denver Nuggets ===
Grunwald was a corporate attorney before returning to basketball as vice president and general counsel of the Denver Nuggets in 1990.

=== Toronto Raptors ===
From 1994 to 1997 Grunwald was vice president for legal affairs and assistant general manager of the expansion Toronto Raptors, working with college teammate and general manager Isiah Thomas. He became general manager in 1997 after Thomas failed in his attempt to become majority owner and ended his connection to the team. He oversaw some of the Raptors' greatest years of success, including orchestrating a trade for Vince Carter and team's first trip to the NBA conference semi-finals. The Raptors managed three straight playoff berths from 2000–2002.

The injury-plagued Raptors missed the playoffs in the 2002–03 season, and Grunwald shook up the roster. During the 2003–04 season, despite inconsistency, they went 25–25 and were on track to return to the playoffs. Grunwald traded away starting center Antonio Davis in December, which led to tension with coach Kevin O'Neill, who publicly complained about the lack of a starting center and roster depth. On April 1, 2004, Grunwald was fired with two weeks left in the season, and replaced by Jack McCloskey as interim GM. The Raptors missed the playoffs by three games. Rob Babcock was later appointed as the permanent replacement.

=== Toronto civic activism ===
Grunwald later became the president and CEO of the Toronto Board of Trade, the largest local business organization in Canada, and is heavily involved in both the business and social communities of Toronto. In addition to his work at the Board of Trade, he sat on the board of governors at George Brown College, the board of directors at the Greater Toronto Marketing Alliance, and the board of the Toronto City Summit Alliance. He was further involved with the Centre for Addiction and Mental Health, as well as Canada Basketball.

=== New York Knicks ===
On September 28, 2006, Grunwald accepted a job as vice president for basketball operations for the New York Knicks, again working with Isiah Thomas. Grunwald was named interim GM for Knicks on June 4, 2011, taking over from Donnie Walsh.

On April 24, 2012, the Knicks promoted Grunwald to (permanent) general manager and executive vice president of basketball operations.

In September, 2013, Grunwald was replaced as general manager by Steve Mills, and reassigned by the Knicks to serve as an advisor to Mills.

== McMaster University ==
On August 7, 2014, he was named director of athletics at McMaster University in Hamilton, Ontario. He left the position in August 2018 to take a role with the Memphis Grizzlies.

== Personal ==
Grunwald came to Toronto in 1994 and obtained his Canadian citizenship in 1999. He is married to former Toronto Sun columnist and lawyer Heather Bird. He has three children named Gabe, Emma and Willis.

Preceded by Isiah Thomas	Toronto Raptors General Manager; 1998–2004	Succeeded by Jack McCloskey (interim)
