= Rhodes School District 84.5 =

School district in Illinois, United States

Address
- 8931 Fullerton Avenue River Grove, Illinois, 60171; United States

District information
- Type: Public
- Grades: PreK–8
- NCES District ID: 1733390

Students and staff
- Students: 557

Other information
- Website: www.rhodes.k12.il.us

Rhodes School District 84.5 is a school district headquartered in River Grove, Illinois. It has a single K-8 school: Rhodes School.

Debra Suhadja served as principal of the school from 2006 until she retired in 2015.
