= 1996 United States Senate election in Illinois =

- November 5, 1996
- Turnout: 63.79%
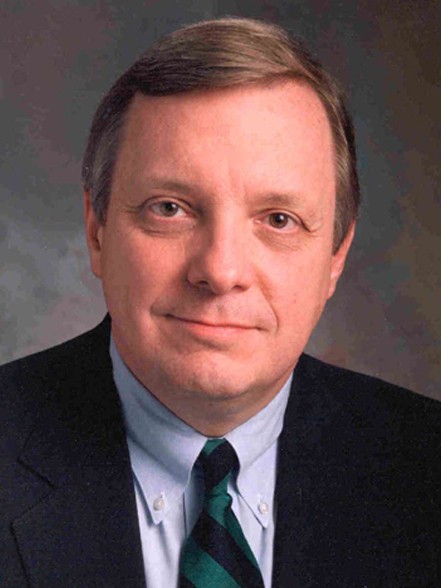

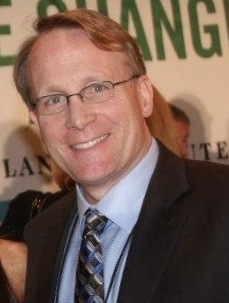
Nominee	Dick Durbin	Al Salvi
Party	Democratic	Republican
Popular vote	2,384,028	1,728,824
Percentage	56.09%	40.67%
- County results Durbin: 40–50% 50–60% 60–70% Salvi: 40–50% 50–60% 60–70%
U.S. senator before election
Paul Simon
Democratic
Elected U.S. Senator
Dick Durbin
Democratic

The 1996 United States Senate election in Illinois took place on November 5, 1996. Incumbent Democratic U.S. Senator Paul Simon chose to retire, rather than seek a third term in office. In the Democratic primary, U.S. Representative Dick Durbin emerged victorious, while state representative Al Salvi won the Republican primary. Though the election was initially anticipated to be close, Durbin ended up defeating Salvi by a comfortable double-digit margin of victory, allowing him to win what would be the first of five terms in the Senate.

== Background ==
The primaries and general elections coincided with those for other federal offices (president and House), as well as those for state offices.

For the primaries, turnout was 25.85%, with 1,583,406 votes cast. For the general election, turnout was 63.79%, with 4,250,722 votes cast.

== Democratic primary ==
=== Candidates ===
- Jalil Ahmad, real estate agent
- Dick Durbin, incumbent U.S. Representative from Illinois's 20th congressional district
- Ronald F. Gibbs, advisor to former Chicago Mayor Harold Washington
- Paul H. D. Park, member of Chicago's Economic Development Commission
- Pat Quinn, former Illinois State Treasurer

==== Declined ====
- Neil Hartigan, former Illinois Attorney General (1983–1991), former Lieutenant Governor of Illinois (1973–1977), and Democratic nominee for Governor in 1990
- William M. Daley, attorney, political consultant, and member of the Daley family (endorsed Hartigan)

=== Results ===
Democratic primary results
Party	Candidate	Votes	%
Democratic	Dick Durbin	512,520	64.87%
Democratic	Pat Quinn	233,138	29.51%
Democratic	Ronald F. Gibbs	17,681	2.24%
Democratic	Jalil Ahmad	17,211	2.18%
Democratic	Paul H. D. Park	9,505	1.20%
Total votes		790,055	100

Results by county Map legend: Quinn 40–50%; Durbin 40–50%; Durbin 50–60%; Durbin 60–70%; Durbin 70–80%; Durbin >90%

== Republican primary ==
=== Candidates ===
- Al Salvi, incumbent State Representative
- Martin Paul Gallagher
- Wayne S. Kurzeja
- Bob Kustra, incumbent Lieutenant Governor of Illinois
- Robert Marshall, perennial candidate

=== Results ===
Republican primary results
Party	Candidate	Votes	%
Republican	Al Salvi	377,141	47.64%
Republican	Bob Kustra	342,935	43.32%
Republican	Robert Marshall	43,937	5.55%
Republican	Martin Paul Gallagher	17,276	2.18%
Republican	Wayne S. Kurzeja	10,356	1.31%
Total votes		791,645	100

== Libertarian primary ==
=== Candidates ===
- David F. Hoscheidt, attorney from Bloomington
- Robin J. Miller, businessman from East Peoria, Illinois

=== Results ===
Libertarian primary results
Party	Candidate	Votes	%
Libertarian	Robin J. Miller	1,258	73.74
Libertarian	David F. Hoscheidt	448	26.26
Total votes		1,706	100

== General election ==
=== Results ===
Durbin won the election easily.

United States Senate election in Illinois, 1996
Party	Candidate	Votes	%	±%
Democratic	Dick Durbin	2,384,028	56.09%	−8.98%
Republican	Al Salvi	1,728,824	40.67%	+5.74%
Reform	Steven H. Perry	61,023	1.44%	
Libertarian	Robin J. Miller	41,218	0.97%	
Constitution	Chad N. Koppie	17,563	0.40%	
Natural Law	James E. Davis	13,838	0.33%	
Write-ins		4,228	0.10%	
Majority		655,204	15.41%	−14.72%
Turnout		4,250,722	63.79	
Democratic hold		Swing		

== See also ==
- 1996 United States Senate elections
