= Tom Dore =

American basketball player

- Spouse: Cheryl
- Children: 3
- Basketball career

Personal information
- Listed height: 7 ft 2 in (2.18 m)

Career information
- High school: East Leyden High School
- College: University of Missouri (1976–1980)
- Position: Center
- Presenting career
- Network: Comcast Sportsnet

Tom Dore is an American retired basketball player and former Comcast SportsNet play-by-play announcer for the National Basketball Association's Chicago Bulls.

A native of Northlake, Illinois, the 7-foot-2-inch (218 cm) Dore played basketball at East Leyden High School in Franklin Park, Illinois, where he was an All-America honoree during the mid-1970s.

Dore went on to play at the University of Missouri, where he appeared in two NCAA Tournaments and became the school's all-time leader in tournament blocked shots.

Dore played professional basketball in France and New Zealand before he embarked on a broadcasting career. During the 1980s and early 1990s, he provided color commentary and play-by-play for The University of Texas, Southern Methodist University and the University of Missouri sports events on the radio.

In 1991, Dore joined the Chicago Bulls broadcasting crew. The trio of 7 ft 2 in (218 cm) Dore, 6 ft 9 in (206 cm) color commentator Johnny "Red" Kerr, and 6 ft 11 in (211 cm) color commentator Stacey King formed one of the tallest broadcasting teams in sports history.

On May 6, 2008, the Bulls released Dore from his contract and replaced him with Neil Funk, their former Bulls radio play-by-play man. Broadcast partner Johnny "Red" Kerr, who had provided analysis on Comcast SportsNet and WGN, had his role reduced, working only pre-game and half-time shows for home games.

Dore was also the radio voice of the Arena Football League's Chicago Rush.
