= Mannheim School District 83 =

School district in Illinois, United States

Address
- 10401 Grand Avenue Franklin Park, Illinois, 60131; United States

District information
- Type: Public
- Grades: PreK–8
- NCES District ID: 1724330

Students and staff
- Students: 2,524

Other information
- Website: www.d83.org

Mannheim School District 83 (D83) is a school district headquartered in Franklin Park, Illinois. It serves Franklin Park, Melrose Park, and Northlake. The school district was established in 1869 as a wooden building at the corner of Grand Avenue and Mannheim Road. Mannheim was a small town that was annexed into Franklin Park in the 1890s.

== Schools ==
The sole middle school is Mannheim Middle School in Melrose Park.

Elementary schools:

- Roy Elementary School (Northlake)
- Scott Elementary School (Melrose Park)
- Westdale Elementary School (Northlake)

The preschool is Mannheim Early Childhood Center in Northlake.

Enger School in Melrose Park is an alternative school for students with disabilities.
