= 1998 Illinois elections =

- November 3, 1998
- Turnout: 52.43%

Elections were held in Illinois on Tuesday, November 3, 1998. Primary elections were held on March 17, 1998.

These elections saw Democrats make gains. The Democratic Party went from holding no statewide offices, to holding two.

== Election information ==
1998 was a midterm election year in the United States.

=== Turnout ===
==== Primary election ====
For the primary election, turnout was 27.04%, with 1,824,806 votes cast.

Turnout by county

County	Registration	Votes cast	Turnout
Adams	39,753	8,380	21.08%
Alexander	7,519	3,603	47.92%
Bond	9,811	1,793	18.28%
Boone	22,061	7,131	32.32%
Brown	3,271	2,029	62.03%
Bureau	25,112	7,924	31.55%
Calhoun	3,798	1,220	32.12%
Carroll	10,905	3,842	35.23%
Cass	9,649	4,374	45.33%
Champaign	115,156	21,566	18.73%
Christian	23,603	8,173	34.63%
Clark	12,084	3,727	30.84%
Clay	10,087	2,676	26.53%
Clinton	24,358	2,950	12.11%
Coles	29,461	9,289	31.53%
Cook (Note: For more on Cook County primary election turnout, see 1998 Cook County, Illinois elections#Primary election)	2,721,334	780,580	28.68%
Crawford	13,381	3,772	28.19%
Cumberland	7,915	2,686	33.94%
DeKalb	45,534	8,651	19%
DeWitt	11,513	2,244	19.49%
Douglas	11,281	2,319	20.56%
DuPage	460,688	113,345	24.6%
Edgar	13,029	3,149	24.17%
Edwards	5,143	2,380	46.28%
Effingham	19,711	6,133	31.11%
Fayette	13,422	3,850	28.68%
Ford	8,384	4,543	54.19%
Franklin	30,636	13,688	44.68%
Fulton	25,999	9,500	36.54%
Gallatin	4,731	2,812	59.44%
Greene	8,923	2,801	31.39%
Grundy	22,468	5,960	26.53%
Hamilton	6,379	3,415	53.54%
Hancock	12,821	4,967	38.74%
Hardin	3,743	2,417	64.57%
Henderson	5,324	2,154	40.46%
Henry	32,819	7,881	24.01%
Iroquois	18,397	5,591	30.39%
Jackson	44,300	10,881	24.56%
Jasper	7,547	3,862	51.17%
Jefferson	25,924	7,253	27.98%
Jersey	13,964	4,029	28.85%
Jo Daviess	14,413	2,827	19.61%
Johnson	7,120	3,676	51.63%
Kane	177,041	51,342	29.00%
Kankakee	57,482	8,217	14.29%
Kendall	31,224	7,430	23.8%
Knox	34,117	7,757	22.74%
Lake	316,111	78,977	24.98%
LaSalle	65,229	16,659	25.54%
Lawrence	11,336	2,834	25.00%
Lee	20,431	6,332	30.99%
Livingston	22,714	8,902	39.19%
Logan	18,665	7,589	40.66%
Macon	72,319	20,844	28.82%
Macoupin	35,243	10,428	29.59%
Madison	164,136	34,057	20.75%
Marion	28,158	7,408	26.31%
Marshall	8,386	1,684	20.08%
Mason	10,598	2,214	20.89%
Massac	12,435	3,454	27.78%
McDonough	18,536	4,658	25.13%
McHenry	142,461	39,492	27.72%
McLean	85,655	18,930	22.1%
Menard	8,194	3,018	36.83%
Mercer	11,717	2,274	19.41%
Monroe	18,228	6,089	33.4%
Montgomery	20,983	4,232	20.17%
Morgan	20,885	4,331	20.74%
Moultrie	8,234	2,916	35.41%
Ogle	28,094	6,932	24.67%
Peoria	105,139	20,889	19.87%
Perry	15,388	5,828	37.87%
Piatt	11,034	2,960	26.83%
Pike	12,814	4,611	35.98%
Pope	3,250	1,820	56.00%
Pulaski	5,470	2,445	44.70%
Putnam	4,383	2,131	48.62%
Randolph	23,496	8,155	34.71%
Richland	12,753	4,028	31.58%
Rock Island	101,715	22,710	22.33%
Saline	18,053	9,025	49.99%
Sangamon	121,984	35,680	29.25%
Schuyler	5,926	2,107	35.56%
Scott	3,627	1,493	41.16%
Shelby	14,326	4,857	33.9%
Stark	4,540	1,135	25.00%
St. Clair	153,502	29,738	19.37%
Stephenson	31,107	7,920	25.46%
Tazewell	81,769	23,112	28.26%
Union	14,571	6,063	41.61%
Vermilion	50,035	11,115	22.21%
Wabash	9,191	2,125	23.12%
Warren	11,279	2,944	26.1%
Washington	10,663	2,860	26.82%
Wayne	12,773	4,263	33.38%
White	11,693	5,442	46.54%
Whiteside	35,370	4,726	13.36%
Will	229,337	53,784	23.45%
Williamson	39,063	16,509	42.26%
Winnebago	158,118	29,238	18.49%
Woodford	22,924	10,050	43.84%
Total	6,747,376	1,824,806	27.04%

==== General election ====
For the general election, turnout was 52.43%, with 3,541,379 votes cast.

Turnout by county

County	Registration	Votes cast	Turnout%
Adams	41,285	25,575	61.95%
Alexander	7,547	3,990	52.87%
Bond	10,205	5,343	52.36%
Boone	21,953	9,950	45.32%
Brown	3,565	2,850	79.94%
Bureau	24,773	15,087	60.9%
Calhoun	3,745	2,650	70.76%
Carroll	10,385	6,199	59.69%
Cass	9,752	4,723	48.43%
Champaign	127,069	50,026	39.37%
Christian	24,112	12,302	51.02%
Clark	12,197	6,517	53.43%
Clay	9,254	5,354	57.86%
Clinton	24,391	11,990	49.16%
Coles	30,165	16,959	56.22%
Cook (Note: For more on Cook County general election turnout, see 1998 Cook County, Illinois elections#General election)	2,625,022	1,433,423	54.61%
Crawford	13,763	7,194	52.27%
Cumberland	8,125	4,186	51.52%
DeKalb	52,659	22,131	42.03%
DeWitt	10,408	5,294	50.86%
Douglas	11,637	5,911	50.79%
DuPage	443,387	257,729	58.13%
Edgar	13,280	7,447	56.08%
Edwards	5,127	2,971	57.95%
Effingham	20,666	11,639	56.32%
Fayette	14,035	8,189	58.35%
Ford	8,660	5,478	63.26%
Franklin	31,202	17,097	54.79%
Fulton	24,611	13,026	52.93%
Gallatin	4,704	3,215	68.35%
Greene	8,769	5,047	57.56%
Grundy	23,476	12,533	53.39%
Hamilton	6,487	4,368	67.33%
Hancock	13,271	8,234	62.05%
Hardin	3,833	2,824	73.68%
Henderson	5,493	3,578	65.14%
Henry	33,838	19,022	56.21%
Iroquois	18,137	11,150	61.48%
Jackson	43,168	18,919	43.83%
Jasper	7,673	4,274	55.7%
Jefferson	26,587	12,683	47.7%
Jersey	13,126	7,364	56.1%
Jo Daviess	15,017	8,109	54%
Johnson	7,487	5,038	67.29%
Kane	188,596	91,059	48.28%
Kankakee	55,176	30,720	55.68%
Kendall	32,945	15,596	47.34%
Knox	34,377	19,379	56.37%
Lake	309,409	158,547	51.24%
LaSalle	67,876	35,919	52.92%
Lawrence	9,875	5,604	56.75%
Lee	21,205	11,086	52.28%
Livingston	21,433	12,212	56.98%
Logan	19,243	10,772	55.98%
Macon	74,913	40,772	54.43%
Macoupin	35,725	15,754	44.1%
Madison	170,151	74,485	43.78%
Marion	29,529	12,430	42.09%
Marshall	8,564	4,467	52.16%
Mason	10,192	5,331	52.31%
Massac	12,760	5,669	44.43%
McDonough	19,632	10,631	54.15%
McHenry	150,683	66,836	44.36%
McLean	94,605	39,813	42.08%
Menard	8,405	5,164	61.44%
Mercer	12,025	7,093	58.99%
Monroe	18,405	9,945	54.03%
Montgomery	21,153	10,255	48.48%
Morgan	21,680	12,032	55.5%
Moultrie	8,208	4,670	56.9%
Ogle	29,479	14,042	47.63%
Peoria	110,820	54,623	49.29%
Perry	15,156	9,652	63.68%
Piatt	11,197	6,351	56.72%
Pike	11,903	7,532	63.28%
Pope	3,332	2,284	68.55%
Pulaski	6,360	3,090	48.58%
Putnam	4,167	2,529	60.69%
Randolph	23,870	13,185	55.24%
Richland	13,226	6,739	50.95%
Rock Island	103,597	48,714	47.02%
Saline	18,579	11,664	62.78%
Sangamon	118,453	76,639	64.7%
Schuyler	6,024	3,398	56.41%
Scott	3,685	2,338	63.45%
Shelby	14,849	8,795	59.23%
Stark	4,586	2,557	55.76%
St. Clair	160,520	72,357	45.08%
Stephenson	32,197	13,674	42.47%
Tazewell	84,100	40,613	48.29%
Union	12,425	7,712	62.07%
Vermilion	49,454	24,994	50.54%
Wabash	9,378	4,978	53.08%
Warren	11,637	6,261	53.8%
Washington	9,985	6,320	63.29%
Wayne	12,776	7,097	55.55%
White	11,646	7,662	65.79%
Whiteside	36,726	17,745	48.32%
Will	271,410	124,154	45.74%
Williamson	40,339	24,470	60.66%
Winnebago	158,736	72,992	45.98%
Woodford	23,575	12,389	52.55%
Total	6,754,998	3,541,379	52.43%

== Federal elections ==
=== United States Senate ===
Incumbent Democratic United States Senator Carol Moseley Braun lost reelection, being unseated by Republican Peter Fitzgerald.

=== United States House ===
All 20 of Illinois' seats in the United States House of Representatives were up for election in 1998.

No seats switched parties, leaving the composition of Illinois' House delegation 10 Democrats and 10 Republicans.

== State elections ==
=== Governor and Lieutenant Governor ===
1998 Illinois gubernatorial election
- November 3, 1998
- Turnout: 49.72%
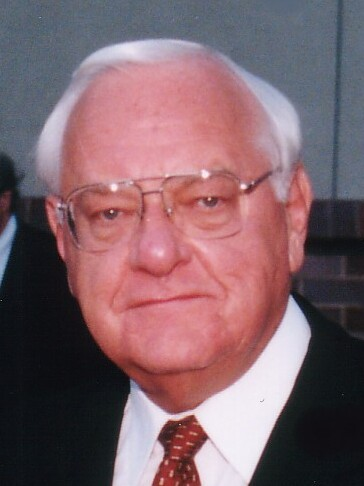

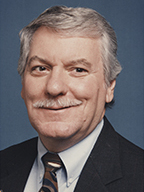
Nominee	George Ryan	Glenn Poshard
Party	Republican	Democratic
Running mate	Corinne Wood	Mary Lou Kearns
Popular vote	1,714,094	1,594,191
Percentage	51.0%	47.8%
- County results Ryan: 40–50% 50–60% 60–70% 70–80% Poshard: 50–60% 60–70% 70–80% 80–90%
Governor before election
Jim Edgar
Republican
Elected Governor
George Ryan
Republican

Incumbent Governor Jim Edgar, a Republican, did not seek a third term. Republican George Ryan was elected to succeed him.

Governor/Lieutenant Governor election
Party	Candidate	Votes	%
Republican	George Ryan / Corinne Wood	1,714,094	51.03
Democratic	Glenn Poshard / Mary Lou Kearns	1,594,191	47.46
Reform	Lawrence Redmond / Phyllis Nirchi	50,372	1.50
Total votes		3,358,705	100

=== Attorney General ===
1998 Illinois Attorney General election
- November 3, 1998
- Turnout: 49.25%
Nominee	Jim Ryan	Miriam Santos
Party	Republican	Democratic
Popular vote	2,026,781	1,242,979
Percentage	60.92%	37.36%
- County results Ryan: 50–60% 60–70% 70–80% 80–90% Santos: 50–60%
Attorney General before election
Jim Ryan
Republican
Elected Attorney General
Jim Ryan
Republican

Incumbent Attorney General Jim Ryan, a Republican, was reelected to a second term. As of 2022 this is the last time a Republican was elected Illinois Attorney General.

==== Democratic primary ====
Attorney General Democratic primary
Party	Candidate	Votes	%
Democratic	Miriam Santos	647,099	100
Democratic	Mister Kawa	3	0.00
Total votes		647,099	100

==== Republican primary ====
Attorney General Republican primary
Party	Candidate	Votes	%
Republican	Jim Ryan (incumbent)	643,487	100
Total votes		643,487	100

==== Reform primary ====
Attorney General Reform primary
Party	Candidate	Votes	%
Reform	Jesse M. Dowell, Jr.	332	50.53
Reform	Daniel J. Kairis	325	49.47
Total votes		657	100

==== General election ====
Attorney General election
Party	Candidate	Votes	%
Republican	Jim Ryan (incumbent)	2,026,781	60.92
Democratic	Miriam Santos	1,242,979	37.36
Reform	Jesse M. Dowell, Jr.	56,944	1.71
Total votes		3,326,704	100

=== Secretary of State ===
1998 Illinois Secretary of State election
- November 3, 1998
- Turnout: 50.04%
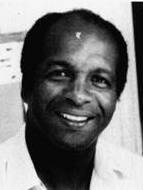

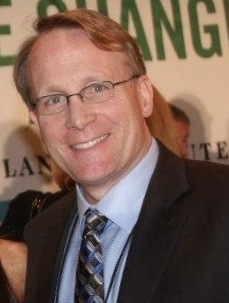
Nominee	Jesse White	Al Salvi
Party	Democratic	Republican
Popular vote	1,874,626	1,437,420
Percentage	55.46%	42.53%
- County results White: 40–50% 50–60% 60–70% 70–80% Salvi: 40–50% 50–60% 60–70%
Secretary of State before election
George Ryan
Republican
Elected Secretary of State
Jesse White
Democratic

Incumbent Secretary of State George Ryan, a Republican, did not seek reelection to a third term in office, instead opting to run for governor. Democrat Jesse White was elected to succeed him in office.

==== Democratic primary ====
Secretary of State Democratic primary
Party	Candidate	Votes	%
Democratic	Jesse White	484,798	55.76
Democratic	Tim McCarthy	384,603	44.24
Total votes		869,401	100

==== Republican primary ====
Secretary of State Republican primary
Party	Candidate	Votes	%
Republican	Al Salvi	365,880	52.99
Republican	Robert W. Churchill	324,529	47.01
Total votes		690,409	100

==== Reform primary ====
Secretary of State Reform primary
Party	Candidate	Votes	%
Reform	Sandra Millatti	426	66.46
Reform	Maryam Omar	215	33.54
Total votes		641	100

==== General election ====
Secretary of State election
Party	Candidate	Votes	%
Democratic	Jesse White	1,874,626	55.46
Republican	Al Salvi	1,437,420	42.53
Reform	Sandra Millatti	67,696	2.00
Independent	Therese M. Battaglia	229	0.01
Total votes		3,379,971	100

=== Comptroller ===
1998 Illinois State Comptroller election
- November 3, 1998
- Turnout: 47.85%
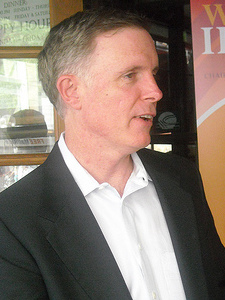

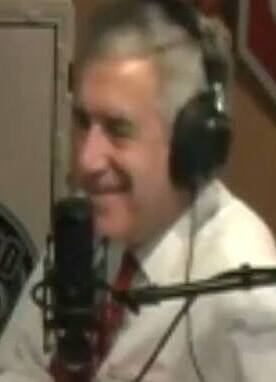
Nominee	Daniel Hynes	Chris Lauzen
Party	Democratic	Republican
Popular vote	1,895,273	1,280,860
Percentage	58.63%	39.63%
- County results Hynes: 40–50% 50–60% 60–70% 70–80% Lauzen: 40–50% 50–60% 60–70%
State Comptroller before election
Loleta Didrickson
Republican
Elected State Comptroller
Daniel Hynes
Democratic

Incumbent Comptroller Loleta Didrickson, a Republican, did not seek reelection to a second term, instead opting to (ultimately unsuccessfully) run for the Republican nomination for United States Senate. Democrat Daniel Hynes was elected to succeed her in office.

==== Democratic primary ====
Comptroller Democratic primary
Party	Candidate	Votes	%
Democratic	Daniel Hynes	632,141	100
Total votes		632,141	100

==== Republican primary ====
Comptroller Republican primary
Party	Candidate	Votes	%
Republican	Chris Lauzen	317,766	51.48
Republican	Harry Seigle	299,469	48.52
Total votes		617,235	100

==== Reform primary ====
Comptroller Reform primary
Party	Candidate	Votes	%
Reform	Houstoun McIntosh Sadler II	579	100
Total votes		579	100

==== General election ====
Comptroller election
Party	Candidate	Votes	%
Democratic	Daniel Hynes	1,895,273	58.63
Republican	Chris Lauzen	1,280,860	39.63
Reform	Houstoun McIntosh Sadler II	56,219	1.74
Total votes		3,232,352	100

=== Treasurer ===
1998 Illinois State Treasurer election
- November 3, 1998
- Turnout: 47.71%
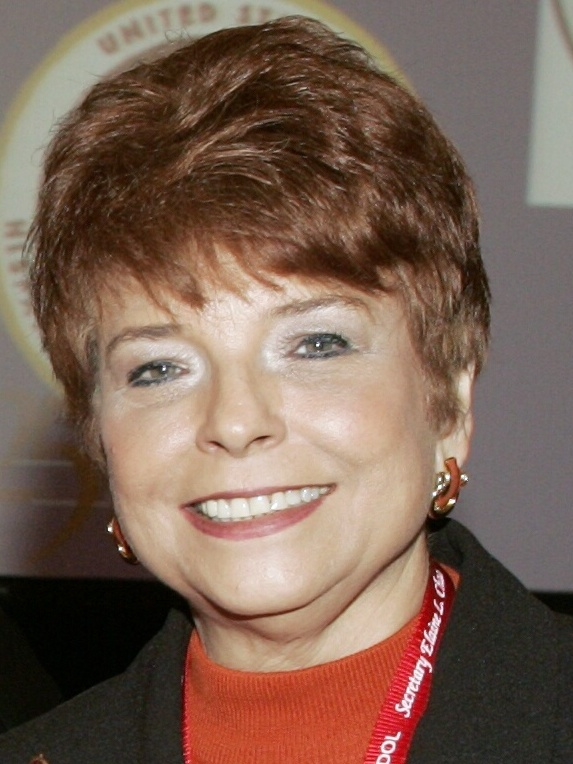

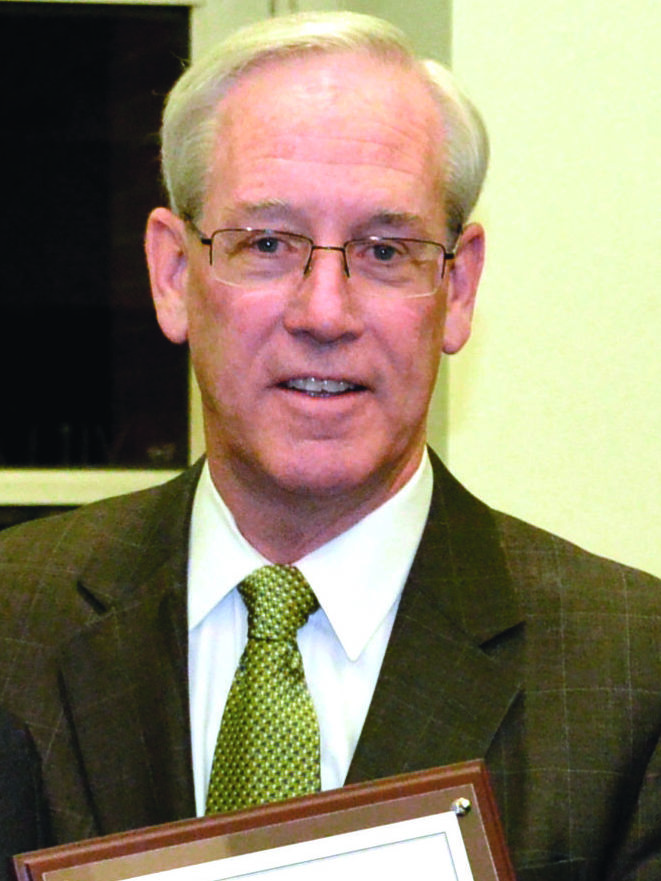
Nominee	Judy Baar Topinka	Daniel J. McLaughlin
Party	Republican	Democratic
Popular vote	1,610,498	1,548,219
Percentage	49.97%	48.04%
- County results Topinka: 40–50% 50–60% 60–70% 70–80% McLaughlin: 40–50% 50–60% 60–70% 70–80%
Treasurer before election
Judy Baar Topinka
Republican
Elected Treasurer
Judy Baar Topinka
Republican

Incumbent Treasurer Judy Baar Topinka, a Republican, was reelected to a second term.

==== Democratic primary ====
Orland Park mayor Daniel J. McLaughlin defeated Calumet City mayor Jerry Genova.

Treasurer Democratic primary
Party	Candidate	Votes	%
Democratic	Daniel J. McLaughlin	419,735	57.51
Democratic	Jerry Genova	310,052	42.49
Total votes		729,787	100

==== Republican primary ====
Treasurer Republican primary
Party	Candidate	Votes	%
Republican	Judy Baar Topinka (incumbent)	591,932	100
Total votes		591,932	100

==== Reform primary ====
Treasurer Reform primary
Party	Candidate	Votes	%
Reform	Valorie Bain	338	50.90
Reform	William P. Rakes	326	49.10
Total votes		664	100

==== General election ====
Treasurer election
Party	Candidate	Votes	%
Republican	Judy Baar Topinka (incumbent)	1,610,498	49.97
Democratic	Daniel J. McLaughlin	1,548,219	48.04
Reform	Valorie Bain	64,001	1.99
Independent	Mark A. Mastrogiovanni	226	0.01
Total votes		3,222,944	100

=== State Senate ===
1998 Illinois Senate election
- November 3, 1998

41 of 59 seats in the Illinois Senate 30 seats needed for a majority
	Majority party	Minority party
Party	Republican	Democratic
Last election	31	28
Seats won	32	27
Seat change	▲1	▼1
- Results: Republican gain Republican hold Democratic hold No election
President before election
James Philip
Republican
Elected President
James Philip
Republican

41 out of 59 seats in the Illinois Senate were up for election in 1998. Republicans retained control of the chamber.

=== State House of Representatives ===
1998 Illinois House of Representatives election
- November 3, 1998

All 118 seats in the Illinois House of Representatives 60 seats needed for a majority
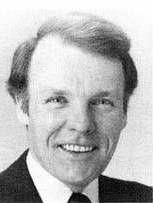

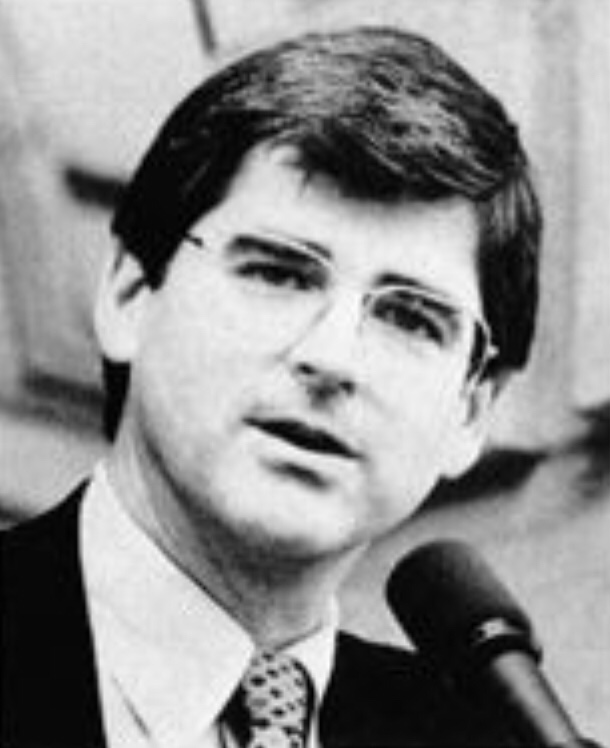
	Majority party	Minority party
Leader	Michael Madigan	Lee Daniels
Party	Democratic	Republican
Leader's seat	22nd	46th
Last election	60	58
Seats won	62	56
Seat change	▲2	▼2
- Results: Democratic gain Democratic hold Republican hold
Speaker before election
Michael Madigan
Democratic
Speaker-Elect
Michael Madigan
Democratic

All of the seats in the Illinois House of Representatives were up for election in 1998. Democrats retained control of the chamber.

=== Judicial elections ===
Multiple judicial positions were up for election in 1998.

=== Ballot measure ===
Illinois voters voted on a single ballot measure in 1998. In order to be approved, the measures required either 60% support among those specifically voting on the amendment or 50% support among all ballots cast in the elections.

==== Illinois Courts Commission Amendment ====
Voters approved the Illinois Courts Commission Amendment, a legislatively referred constitutional amendment which amended Article VI, Section 15 of the Constitution of Illinois to make modifications to the courts commission.

Illinois Courts Commission Amendment
Option	Votes	% of votes on measure	% of all ballots cast
Yes	1,677,109	80.47	47.37
No	407,014	19.53	11.49
Total votes	2,084,123	100	58.85
Voter turnout	30.85%		

Amendment results by county Yes: 80–90%; 70–80%; 60–70%

== Local elections ==
Local elections were held. These included county elections, such as the Cook County elections.
