= Al Salvi =

American politician

Albert J. Salvi III
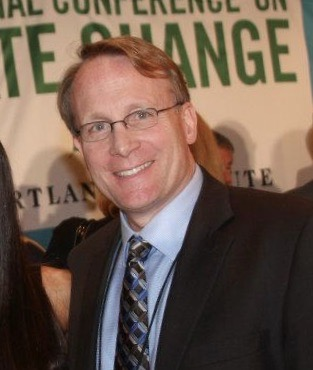
- Al Salvi in 2014

Member of the Illinois House of Representatives from the 52nd district
- In office January 13, 1993 – October 22, 1996
- Preceded by: Geoffrey Obrzut
- Succeeded by: Mark H. Beaubien Jr.

Personal details
- Born: April 25, 1960 (age 66) Evanston, Illinois, U.S.
- Party: Republican
- Spouse: Kathy Keller (m. 1988)
- Children: 6
- Relatives: Chris Salvi (nephew)
- Education: University of Notre Dame (BA); University of Illinois College of Law (JD)

Albert J. Salvi III (born April 25, 1960) is an American attorney, politician, and former radio talk show host. He served as a member of the Illinois House of Representatives and was a Republican nominee for the United States Senate and Illinois Secretary of State.

== Career ==
In 1986, Salvi ran for the United States House of Representatives in Illinois's 19th congressional district, but lost to Terry L. Bruce.

Salvi was elected to the Illinois House of Representatives in 1992, representing the 52nd district, which was based in western Lake County. He served as Representative until 1996, when he left his seat to run for the U.S. Senate seat being vacated by two-term Democrat Paul Simon. In his Senate run, Salvi defeated Lieutenant Governor Bob Kustra in the Republican primary, but was defeated by U.S. Representative Dick Durbin in the general election.

In 1998, Salvi ran for Illinois Secretary of State. He defeated State Representative Robert W. Churchill in the Republican primary, but lost in the general election to Democrat Jesse White.

Salvi has donated to several Republican Party candidates, including Donald Trump, Rick Santorum, Herman Cain, Dan Quayle, Peter Roskam, and Phil Crane.

He was the host of The Al Salvi Show, an issues-oriented radio talk show which aired on WKRS AM 1220 in Waukegan, Illinois, when this station aired a news-talk format. In 2006, he left his radio show on WKRS to further pursue his legal career. He was replaced in the 10 AM to noon time slot by Bruno Behrend, another WKRS radio host. In 2007, Salvi temporarily returned to WKRS and was on the air two days a week.

== Electoral history ==
- 1998 Secretary of State election
  - Jesse White (D), 1,874,626, 55.46%
  - Al Salvi (R), 1,437,420, 42.53%
  - Sandra Millatti (RF), 67,696, 2%
- 1998 Secretary of State Republican primary
  - Al Salvi, 365,880, 53.0%
  - Robert W. Churchill, 324,529, 47.0%
- 1996 U.S. Senate election
  - Dick Durbin (D), 2,384,028, 56.09%
  - Al Salvi (R), 1,728,824, 40.67%
  - Steven H. Perry (Ref), 61,023, 1%
  - Robin J. Miller (Lbt), 41,218 1%
- 1996 Republican primary for U.S. Senate
  - Al Salvi, 377,141, 48%
  - Bob Kustra, 342,935, 43%
  - Robert Marshall, 43,937, 6%
  - Martin Paul Gallagher, 17,276, 2%
  - Wayne S. Kurzeja, 10,356, 1%
- 1994 Illinois House of Representatives election, District 52
  - Al Salvi (R), 20,947, 79.47%
  - Jayna Ashbacher (D), 5,410, 20.53%
- 1992 Illinois House of Representatives election, District 52
  - Al Salvi (R), 31,817, 100%

== Notes ==
Illinois House of Representatives
Preceded by Geoffrey Obrzut	Member of the Illinois House of Representatives from the 52nd district 1993–1996	Succeeded by Mark H. Beaubien Jr.
Party political offices
Preceded by Lynn Morley Martin	Republican nominee for U.S. Senator from Illinois (Class 2); 1996	Succeeded by Jim Durkin
Preceded by George Ryan	Republican nominee for Secretary of State of Illinois; 1998	Succeeded by Kris O'Rourke Cohn
