= Cernan Earth and Space Center =

Planetarium in Chicago, Illinois, US

Coordinates: 41.9174°N 87.8424°W

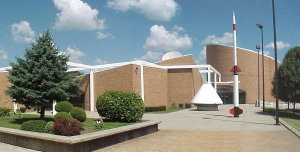
- Cernan Earth and Space Center
- Location: Chicago, United States
- Type: Planetarium

The Cernan Earth and Space Center is a public planetarium on the campus of Triton College in the Chicago suburb of River Grove. It is named for astronaut Eugene Cernan (1934–2017), who flew aboard the Gemini 9 and Apollo 10 missions and, as commander of Apollo 17, was the last astronaut to leave his footprints on the Moon.

An Apollo test capsule is in front of the entrance to the center. Next to it is a Nike Tomahawk sounding rocket.

The Cernan Center's 93-seat 44-foot-diameter (13 m) dome theater housing a Konica-Minolta Super MediaGlobe II fulldome digital projector, a Voyager V-17OWC laser projection system, and numerous auxiliary projectors. Using this equipment, the Cernan Center presents a wide range of programs to persons of all ages who attend its special school and group presentations and weekend public programs.

One Saturday night each month, the Cernan Center offers a Monthly Skywatch program that presents the latest news and discoveries in the fields of astronomy, space science, and geoscience. The Cernan Center also features Earth- and space-related exhibits, the Friends of the Cernan Center membership program, and the Star Store gift shop.
