= Miriam Santos =

American politician

City Treasurer of Chicago
- In office 2000
- Preceded by: Barbara Lumpkin
- Succeeded by: Judith Rice
- In office 1989–1999
- Preceded by: Cecil A. Partee
- Succeeded by: Barbara Lumpkin

Personal details
- Born: Gary, Indiana
- Political party: Democratic
- Education: DePaul University

Miriam Santos is an American politician who served as City Treasurer of Chicago.

== City Treasurer of Chicago ==
In 1989, Santos was appointed by newly-elected mayor Richard M. Daley as City Treasurer of Chicago. She was appointed to replace Cecil A. Partee, who had resigned in order to accept an appointment to succeed Daley himself as Cook County State's Attorney. Santos was the first person of Hispanic/Latina descent to hold citywide office in Chicago.

In 1991, after Santos raised alarm over the city's management of pension funds, mayor Richard M. Daley made an attempt to decrease her powers.

Santos was reelected as City Treasurer in 1993 and 1995, and 1999. In 1998, Santos unsuccessfully ran for Illinois Attorney General.

Santos' 1999 reelection came despite the fact that she was, at the time, under federal indictment for mail fraud and attempted extortion. Months after the 1999 election, she was convicted and forced to resign. Mayor Daley appointed Barbara Lumpkin as Santos' successor. However, Santos' conviction was overturned in 2000, and she was allowed to reclaim her elected position with back pay. However, six months later she again had to resign, as she pleaded guilty to a single count of mail fraud rather than facing retrial.

Party political offices
Preceded by Al Hofeld	Democratic nominee for Attorney General of Illinois; 1998	Succeeded by Lisa Madigan
