= River Grove School District 85.5 =

School district in Illinois, United States

Address
- 2650 Thatcher Avenue River Grove, Illinois, 60171; United States

District information
- Type: Public
- Grades: PreK–8
- NCES District ID: 1733840

Students and staff
- Students: 707

Other information
- Website: www.rivergroveschool.org

River Grove School District 85.5 is a school district headquartered in River Grove, Illinois. It operates a single K-8 school, River Grove Public School. The district was established in the 1830s along a trading trail leading from Chicago to a crossing of the DesPlaines River. The large cast bell from the original framed school building remains in the school's entrance and dates the original building to 1867.

Dr. John Bartelt acted as superintendent between 2004 through 2012. Glenn Grieshaber served as superintendent between 2012 and 2015 after serving as principal for seven years. Joseph Simpkins served as superintendent until 2017, when he became head of Richland School District 88A. Jan Rashid became the superintendent on July 1, 2017.
