= Dohrmann-Buckman House =

Historic house in Illinois, United States

- U.S. National Register of Historic Places
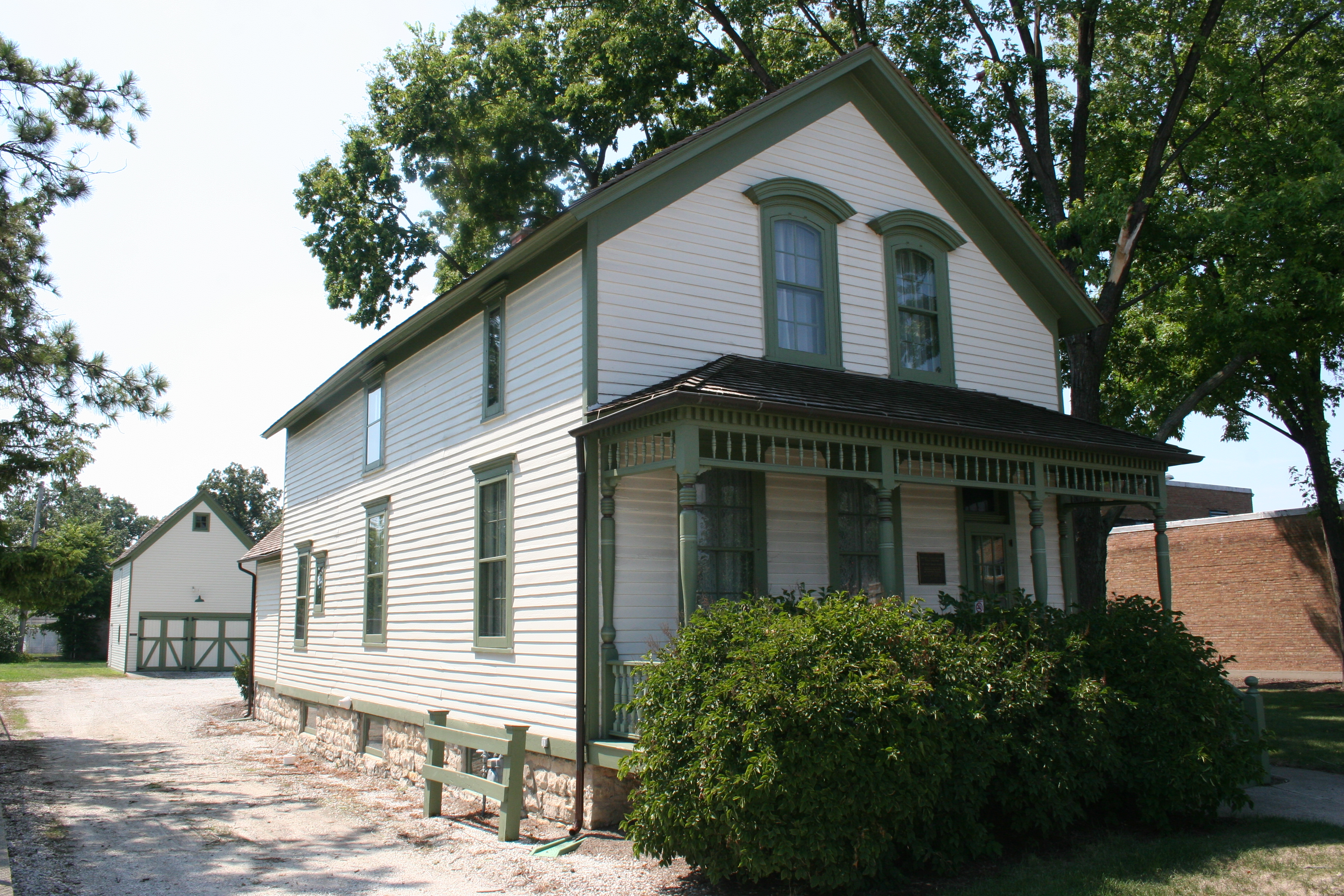

- Location within Chicago metropolitan area Location within Illinois Location within the United States
- Location: 8455 W. Grand Ave., River Grove, Illinois
- Coordinates: 41°55′45″N 87°50′16″W
- Area: 0.5 acres (0.20 ha)
- Built: 1875
- Architectural style: Italianate, Gable front
- NRHP reference No.: 94001598
- Added to NRHP: January 24, 1995

The Dohrmann-Buckman House is a historic house at 8455 W. Grand Avenue in River Grove, Illinois. The house was built in 1875 for original owner Frederick Dohrmann. It has a gable front plan with an Italianate design that includes a front porch with columns and a frieze, a glazed transom above the entrance, and segmental arched windows on the second floor. River Forest village clerk Henry Buckman and his wife Bertha acquired the house in 1890; the couple placed two additions on the house and built a barn on the property. The house remained in the Buckman family until 1992, when it became a historic house museum.

The house was added to the National Register of Historic Places on January 24, 1995.
