= Eugene C. Doyle =

American politician (1925–1989)

Member of the Illinois House of Representatives
- In office 1983–1985

Mayor of Northlake, Illinois
- In office 1968–1989

Personal details
- Born: February 6, 1925 Chicago, Illinois, U.S.
- Died: August 20, 1989 (aged 64) Elmhurst, Illinois, U.S.
- Party: Democratic
- Occupation: Politician

Military service
- Allegiance: United States
- Branch/service: United States Army
- Battles/wars: World War II

Eugene C. Doyle (February 6, 1925 – August 20, 1989) was an American politician.

Doyle was born in Chicago, Illinois. He served in the United States Army during World War II. Doyle lived in Northlake, Illinois with his wife and family. He served as mayor of Northlake from 1968 to 1989 and was a Democrat. Doyle also served in the Illinois House of Representatives from 1983 to 1985 and was a Democrat. He served as a commissioner of the Salt Lake Water Conservation District. Doyle died at the Elmhurst Memorial Hospital in Elmhurst, Illinois.
