= Franklin Park, Illinois =

- Village
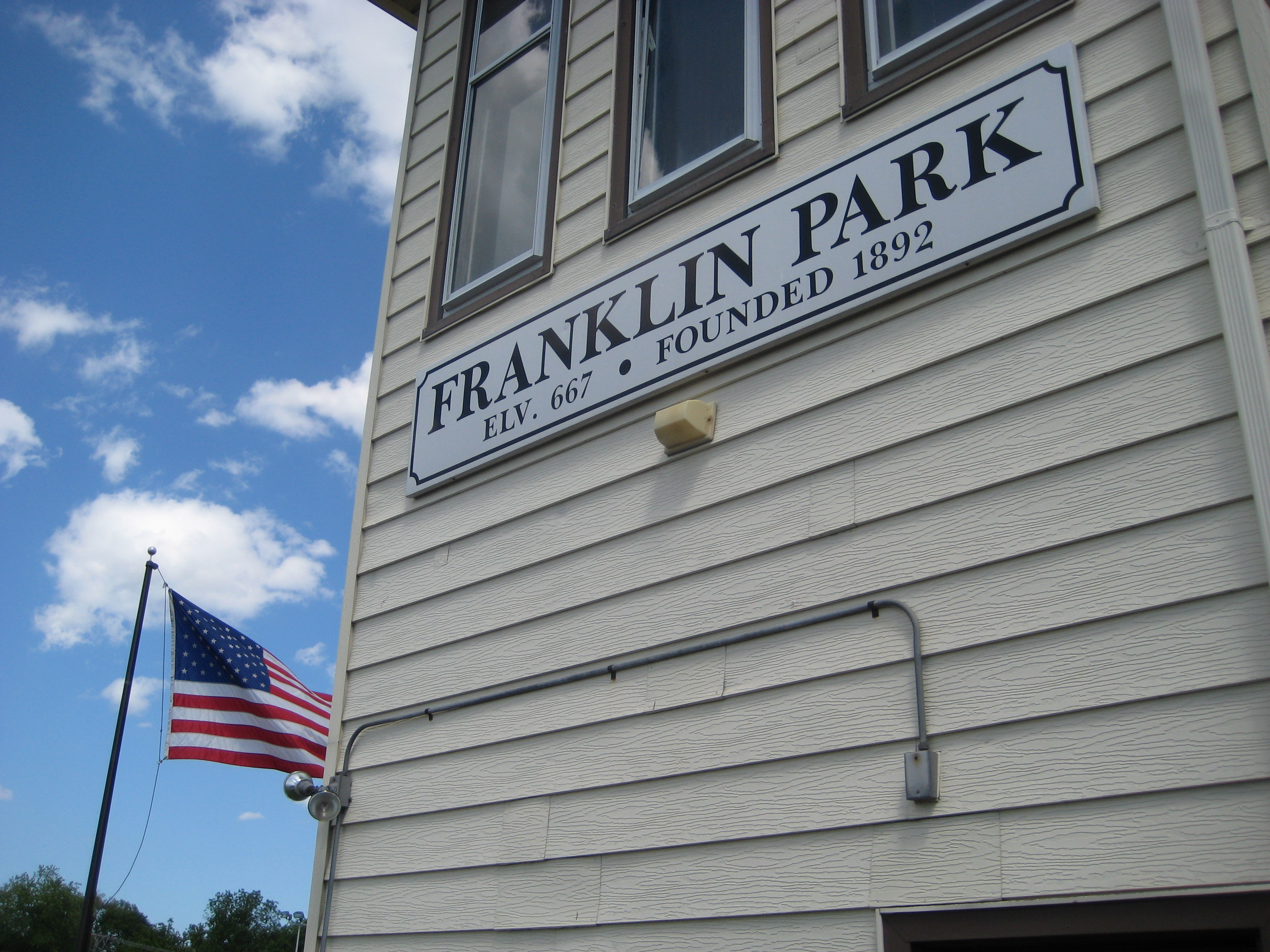
- The Franklin Park B-12 Tower

- Flag Logo
- Interactive map of Franklin Park, Illinois
- Location within Illinois Location within the United States
- Coordinates: 41.935983°N 87.879197°W
- Country: United States
- State: Illinois
- County: Cook
- Township: Leyden
- Settled: 1840's
- Incorporated: 1892

Government
  - Type: Trustee–Village
  - Mayor: Barrett F. Pedersen

Area
  - Total: 4.777 sq mi (12.373 km^{2})
  - Land: 4.777 sq mi (12.373 km^{2})
  - Water: 0 sq mi (0.000 km^{2}) 0.0%
- Elevation: 640 ft (195 m)

Population (2020)
  - Total: 18,467
  - Estimate (2024): 18,110
  - Density: 3,865.6/sq mi (1,492.5/km^{2})
- Time zone: UTC–6 (Central (CST))
  - Summer (DST): UTC–5 (CDT)
- ZIP Code: 60131
- Area codes: 847 and 224
- FIPS code: 17-27702
- GNIS feature ID: 2398919
- Website: villageoffranklinpark.com

Franklin Park is a village in Cook County, Illinois, United States. The population was 18,467 at the 2020 census, and was estimated at 18,110 in 2024. It was named for real estate broker Lesser Franklin who bought acres of the area when it was a majority of farming fields.

== Geography ==
According to the United States Census Bureau, the village has a total area of 4.777 square miles (12.37 km^{2}), all land. It is part of Leyden Township.

== Demographics ==
Historical population
Census	Pop.	Note	%±
1900	483		—
1910	683		41.4%
1920	914		33.8%
1930	2,425		165.3%
1940	3,007		24.0%
1950	8,899		195.9%
1960	18,322		105.9%
1970	20,348		11.1%
1980	17,507		−14.0%
1990	18,485		5.6%
2000	19,434		5.1%
2010	18,333		−5.7%
2020	18,467		0.7%
2024 (est.)	18,110	▼	−1.9%
U.S. Decennial Census; 2020 Census

According to realtor website Zillow, the average price of a home as of November 30, 2025, in Franklin Park is $297,710.

=== Racial and ethnic composition ===
Franklin Park, Illinois – racial and ethnic composition Note: the US Census treats Hispanic/Latino as an ethnic category. This table excludes Latinos from the racial categories and assigns them to a separate category. Hispanics/Latinos may be of any race.
Race / ethnicity (NH = non-Hispanic)	Pop. 1980	Pop. 1990	Pop. 2000	Pop. 2010	Pop. 2020
White alone (NH)	15,749 (89.96%)	14,343 (77.59%)	11,251 (57.89%)	9,573 (52.22%)	7,530 (40.78%)
Black or African American alone (NH)	8 (0.05%)	29 (0.16%)	112 (0.58%)	167 (0.91%)	242 (1.31%)
Native American or Alaska Native alone (NH)	0 (0.00%)	23 (0.12%)	13 (0.07%)	24 (0.13%)	18 (0.10%)
Asian alone (NH)	166 (0.95%)	234 (1.27%)	478 (2.46%)	543 (2.96%)	705 (3.82%)
Pacific Islander alone (NH)	—	—	1 (0.01%)	1 (0.01%)	2 (0.01%)
Other race alone (NH)	41 (0.23%)	7 (0.04%)	12 (0.06%)	13 (0.07%)	70 (0.38%)
Mixed race or multiracial (NH)	—	—	168 (0.86%)	110 (0.60%)	268 (1.45%)
Hispanic or Latino (any race)	1,543 (8.81%)	3,849 (20.82%)	7,399 (38.07%)	7,902 (43.10%)	9,632 (52.16%)
Total	17,507 (100.00%)	18,485 (100.00%)	19,434 (100.00%)	18,333 (100.00%)	18,467 (100.00%)

=== 2020 census ===
As of the 2020 census, Franklin Park had a population of 18,467, with 6,346 households and 4,588 families. The population density was 3,868.24 inhabitants per square mile (1,493.5/km^{2}). 100.0% of residents lived in urban areas, while 0.0% lived in rural areas.

The median age was 39.2 years. 22.0% of residents were under the age of 18 and 14.7% were 65 years of age or older. For every 100 females there were 101.0 males, and for every 100 females age 18 and over there were 99.4 males age 18 and over.

There were 6,346 households, of which 35.4% had children under the age of 18 living in them. Of all households, 50.5% were married-couple households, 18.8% were households with a male householder and no spouse or partner present, and 23.8% were households with a female householder and no spouse or partner present. About 22.7% of all households were made up of individuals and 8.9% had someone living alone who was 65 years of age or older.

There were 6,604 housing units, of which 3.9% were vacant. The homeowner vacancy rate was 1.0% and the rental vacancy rate was 5.7%.

=== American Community Survey estimates ===
As of the 2023 American Community Survey, there are 5,900 estimated households in Franklin Park with an average of 3.09 persons per household. The village has a median household income of $76,009. Approximately 13.6% of the village's population lives at or below the poverty line. Franklin Park has an estimated 66.6% employment rate, with 18.7% of the population holding a bachelor's degree or higher and 77.2% holding a high school diploma. There were 6,182 housing units at an average density of 1,294.12 per square mile (499.7/km^{2}).

The top five reported languages (people were allowed to report up to two languages, thus the figures will generally add to more than 100%) were English (37.9%), Spanish (45.2%), Indo-European (13.5%), Asian and Pacific Islander (1.5%), and Other (1.8%).

The median age in the village was 37.0 years.

=== 2024 estimate ===
As of the 2024 estimate, there were 18,110 people, 5,900 households, and _ families residing in the village. The population density was 3,791.08 inhabitants per square mile (1,463.7/km^{2}). There were 6,182 housing units at an average density of 1,294.12 per square mile (499.7/km^{2}). The racial makeup of the village was 46.8% White (37.6% NH White), 1.0% African American, 2.1% Native American, 3.1% Asian, 0.0% Pacific Islander, _% from some other races and 26.0% from two or more races. Hispanic or Latino people of any race were 58.5% of the population.

=== Income and poverty ===
The median income for a household in the village was $67,755, and the median income for a family was $82,361. Males had a median income of $44,973 versus $30,943 for females. The per capita income for the village was $26,547. About 11.7% of families and 12.5% of the population were below the poverty line, including 21.3% of those under age 18 and 9.7% of those age 65 or over.

== Transportation ==
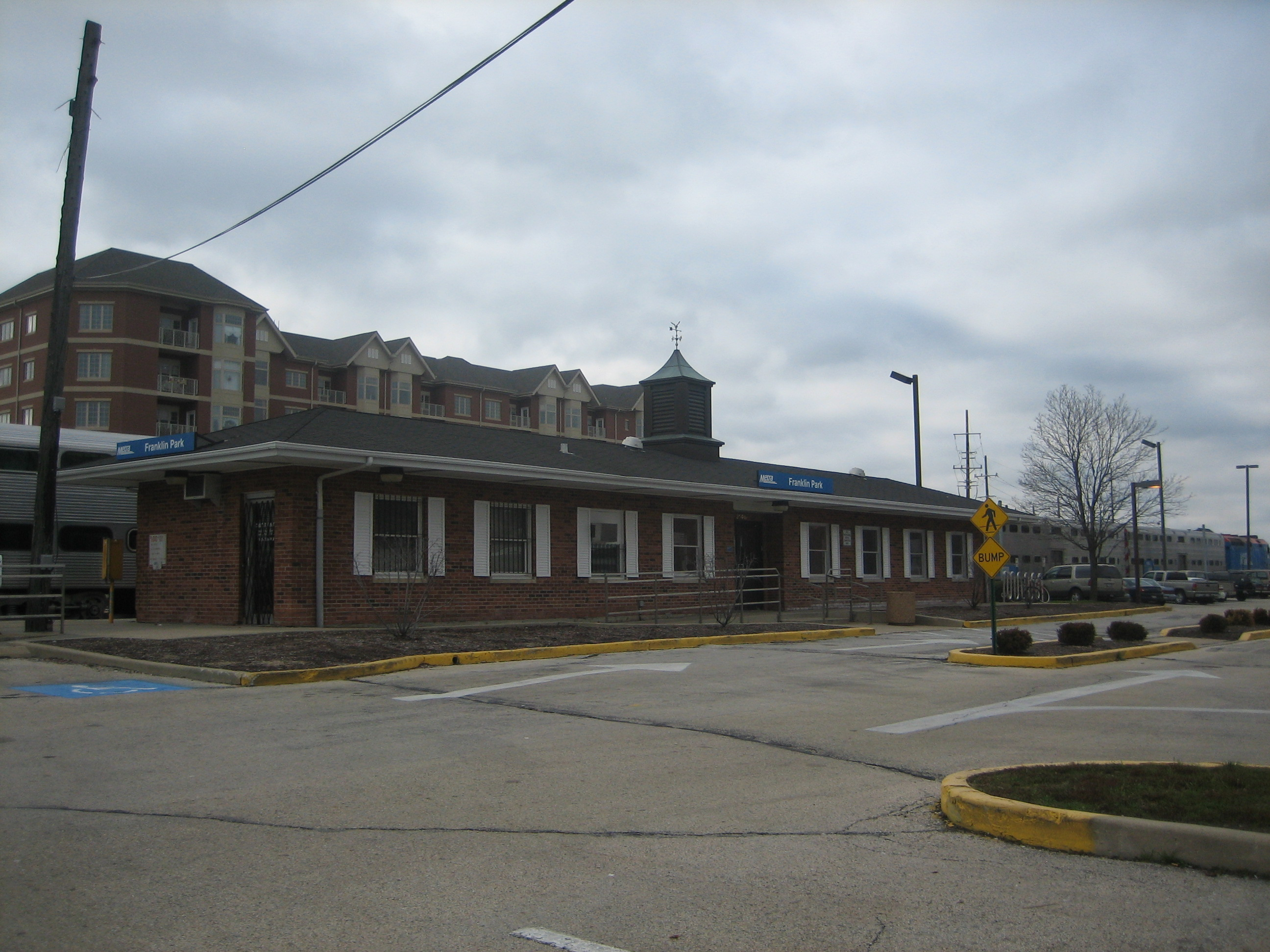
Franklin Park Metra station for the Milwaukee District West Line

Franklin Park has three Metra stations: Belmont Avenue on Metra's North Central Service, which provides daily rail service between Antioch, Illinois and Chicago, Illinois (at Union Station); Franklin Park on Rose Street, and Mannheim on the Milwaukee District West Line which connects Chicago to Elgin, Illinois. Franklin Park is in the close proximity of O'Hare International Airport; airplanes can be seen taking off and descending over the village. The village is served by three railroads: Canadian Pacific Kansas City Limited (formerly Milwaukee Road and Canadian Pacific), Canadian National Railway (formerly Wisconsin Central and Soo Line), and the Indiana Harbor Belt Railroad.

Pace provides bus service on multiple routes connecting Franklin Park to destinations across the region.

== Economy ==
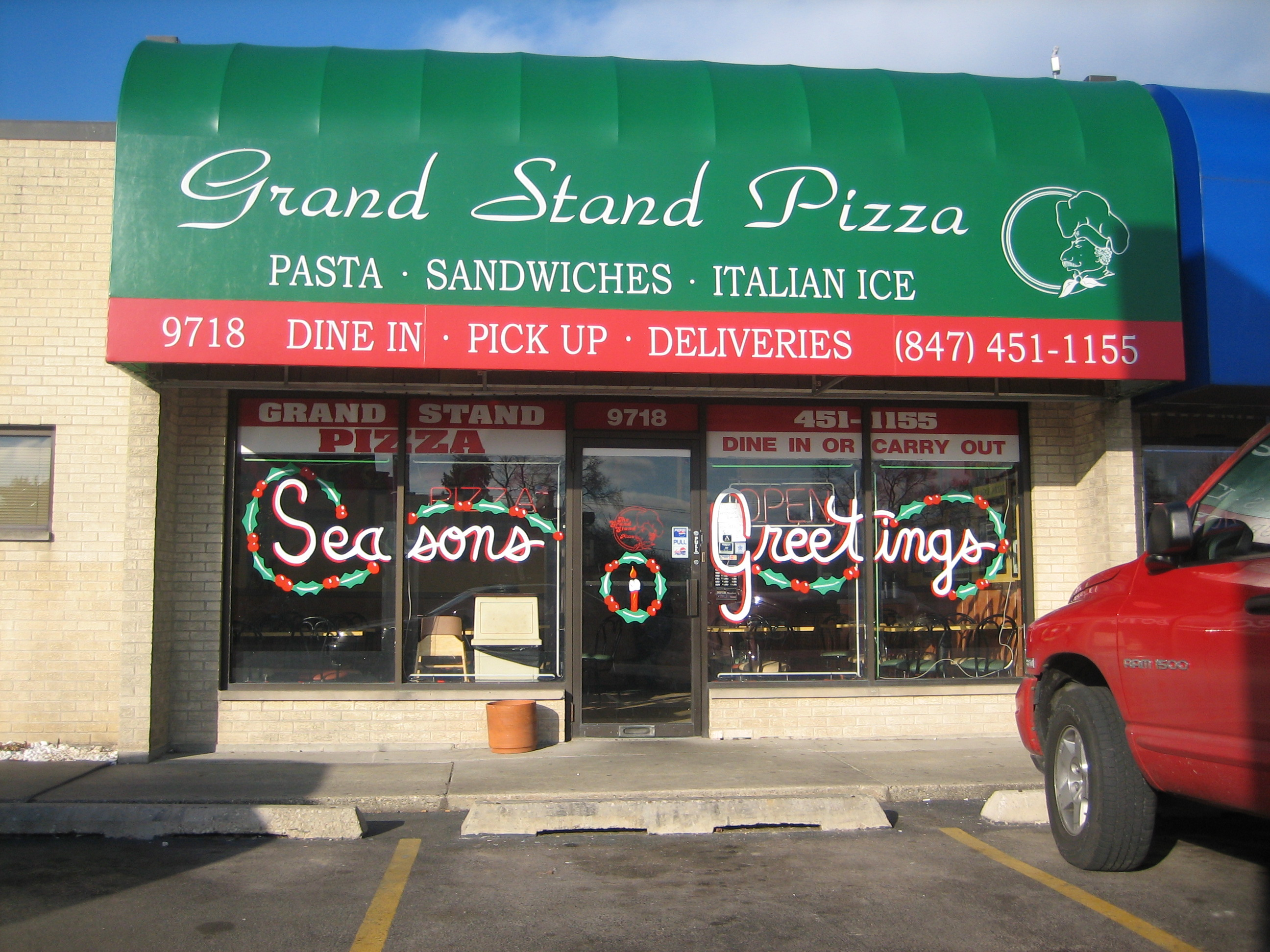
Grand Stand Pizza on Grand Ave.

Among other large employers, the village is home to the Sloan Valve Company, famous for the flushometer.

It was also home to Midway Manufacturing before the company relocated in 1991.

== Education ==
Elementary school districts:

- Franklin Park School District 84
  - Hester Junior High School
  - North Elementary School
  - Passow Elementary School
  - Pietrini Elementary School
  - East Early Childhood Center
- Mannheim School District 83
  - Enger School, for disabled children, in Franklin Park
  - Scott Elementary School
  - Westdale Elementary School
  - Roy Elementary School
  - Mannheim Middle School
- Schiller Park School District 81 includes a portion of Franklin Park.

High school districts:

- Leyden High School District 212
  - East Leyden High School
  - West Leyden High School

Private Catholic schools in nearby River Grove (of the Roman Catholic Archdiocese of Chicago):

- St. Cyprian Catholic Elementary School
- Guerin College Preparatory High School - Guerin will close permanently after Spring 2020.

Triton College is the area community college.

== Notable people ==
- Leo Bartoline, Illinois legislator and lawyer
- Ned Colletti, baseball executive
- Glen Grunwald, only four-time high school All-State basketball player in Illinois history; former GM of Toronto Raptors and New York Knicks
- Mike Shanahan, head coach for the NFL's Los Angeles Raiders, Super Bowl champion Denver Broncos, and Washington Redskins
