= Northlake, Illinois =

- City
- Seal
- Motto: "City of friendly people"
- Location of Northlake in Cook County, Illinois.

- Location within Greater Chicago Location within Illinois Location within the United States
- Coordinates: 41°54′45″N 87°54′3″W
- Country: United States
- State: Illinois
- County: Cook
- Township: Leyden, Proviso

Government
  - Mayor: Jeffrey T. Sherwin

Area
  - Total: 3.18 sq mi (8.23 km^{2})
  - Land: 3.18 sq mi (8.23 km^{2})
  - Water: 0 sq mi (0.00 km^{2})

Population (2020)
  - Total: 12,840
  - Density: 4,042.9/sq mi (1,560.99/km^{2})
- Time zone: UTC-6 (CST)
  - Summer (DST): UTC-5 (CDT)
- ZIP code(s): 60164 (shared with Melrose Park)
- Area codes: 708/464
- FIPS code: 17-53871
- Wikimedia Commons: Northlake, Illinois
- Website: City of Northlake official website

Northlake is a city in Leyden Township and Proviso Township, Cook County, Illinois, United States. The population was 12,840 at the 2020 census. The city's moniker is "The City of Friendly People". The name "Northlake" comes from two streets, North Avenue (IL 64) and Lake Street (US 20), which intersect on the city's West border.

== Geography ==
According to the 2021 census gazetteer files, Northlake has a total area of 3.18 square miles (8.24 km^{2}), all land.

== Demographics ==
Historical population
Census	Pop.	Note	%±
1950	4,361		—
1960	12,318		182.5%
1970	14,191		15.2%
1980	12,166		−14.3%
1990	12,505		2.8%
2000	11,878		−5.0%
2010	12,323		3.7%
2020	12,840		4.2%
U.S. Decennial Census

=== Racial and ethnic composition ===
Northlake village, Illinois – Racial and ethnic composition Note: the US Census treats Hispanic/Latino as an ethnic category. This table excludes Latinos from the racial categories and assigns them to a separate category. Hispanics/Latinos may be of any race.
Race / Ethnicity (NH = Non-Hispanic)	Pop 2000	Pop 2010	Pop 2020	% 2000	% 2010	% 2020
White alone (NH)	6,913	5,008	3,895	58.20%	40.64%	30.33%
Black or African American alone (NH)	277	365	430	2.33%	2.96%	3.35%
Native American or Alaska Native alone (NH)	20	6	6	0.17%	0.05%	0.05%
Asian alone (NH)	425	328	361	3.58%	2.66%	2.81%
Pacific Islander alone (NH)	1	4	0	0.01%	0.03%	0.00%
Other race alone (NH)	8	19	29	0.07%	0.15%	0.23%
Mixed race or Multiracial (NH)	101	73	197	0.85%	0.59%	1.53%
Hispanic or Latino (any race)	4,133	6,520	7,922	34.80%	52.91%	61.70%
Total	11,878	12,323	12,840	100.00%	100.00%	100.00%

=== 2020 census ===
As of the 2020 census, Northlake had a population of 12,840. The median age was 40.2 years. 21.7% of residents were under the age of 18 and 18.5% were 65 years of age or older. For every 100 females, there were 96.0 males, and for every 100 females age 18 and over, there were 93.8 males.

100.0% of residents lived in urban areas, while 0.0% lived in rural areas.

There were 4,093 households, of which 36.3% had children under the age of 18 living in them. Of all households, 46.1% were married-couple households, 19.6% had a male householder with no spouse or partner present, and 27.8% had a female householder with no spouse or partner present. About 26.1% of all households were made up of individuals, and 13.3% had someone living alone who was 65 years of age or older.

There were 4,356 housing units, of which 6.0% were vacant. The homeowner vacancy rate was 0.6%, and the rental vacancy rate was 10.3%.

== Economy ==
A Dominick's distribution center was located in Northlake until the supermarket chain's closure in December 2013. Empire Today is headquartered in Northlake.

== Education ==
Northlake is serviced by two elementary school districts: District 87 (Berkeley) and District 83 (Mannheim).

- District 83: Operates Roy Elementary School and Westdale Elementary School in Northlake and Mannheim Middle School in Melrose Park
- District 87: Riley Elementary School, Whittier Elementary School, and Northlake Middle School

Two high school districts serve sections of Northlake:

- West Leyden High School District 212
  - North of North Ave, west of Mannheim Rd, and south of Belmont Ave is served by West Leyden High School District 212 (with few exceptions).
- Proviso Township High Schools District 209; the section is served by Proviso West High School in Hillside.

Private schools:

- St. John Vianney

Triton College is the designated community college.

== Centerpoint Preserve ==
The Centerpoint Preserve is a 32-acre (13 ha) public park. The land was donated to the City of Northlake by Centerpoint Properties. The Centerpoint Preserve has walking and bicycle paths, a dog park, fitness center, a music park, and picnic pavilion with running water.

== Transportation ==
Pace provides bus service on routes 309, 318, 319 and 330 connecting Northlake to destinations across the region.

== Notable people ==
- Tom Dore, retired American basketball player and former play-by-play announcer for the Chicago Bulls. He is a native of Northlake.
- Eugene C. Doyle, member of the Illinois House of Representatives and Mayor of Northlake
- Little Arthur Duncan, a Chicago blues and electric blues harmonica player, singer, and songwriter, died in Northlake of complications following brain surgery.
- Richard Fegley, professional photographer who worked for Playboy magazine for 30 years. He died in Northlake.
- Manny Flores, alderman for Chicago's 1st ward from 2003 to 2010. He was raised in Northlake.
- Geoffrey Obrzut, Democratic member of the Illinois House of Representatives from 1991 to 1993. He was a Northlake resident while serving as State Representative.
- Mark Venturini, actor. He was a Northlake native and attended West Leyden High School.
- Linda Williamson, Republican member of the Illinois House of Representatives from 1985 to 1991. She was a Northlake resident while serving as State Representative.
