= Triton College =

Public college in River Grove, Illinois, US

- Type: Public community college
- Established: 1964; 62 years ago
- President: Mary-Rita Moore
- Students: 10,931
- Location: River Grove, Illinois, U.S. 41°54′55″N 87°50′35″W
- Campus: Urban
- Nickname: Trojans
- Sporting affiliations: NJCAA – N4C
- Website: www.triton.edu

Triton College is a public community college in River Grove, Illinois.

== History ==
Junior College District 300 was voted into existence in a referendum in March 1964. In March 1965, a second referendum was passed approving the purchase of an 86 acres (34.8 ha) campus site at Fifth Avenue and Palmer Street in River Grove. The school was named Triton College in recognition of the three high school districts that it encompassed – Elmwood Park, Leyden, and Proviso Township. Triton College opened in September 1965 and held classes at several of the high schools in its district. About 1,200 students were enrolled, and full-time in-district tuition was US$5 per semester hour.

Construction on the permanent campus began in June 1967 with the Technology building and proceeded in phases. With the opening of the Learning Resource Center in 1974, the original campus plan was essentially complete, except for some athletic facilities and the Performing Arts Center, a large auditorium planned for the area now occupied by the soccer field, but never built. The original Cernan Space Center building, located north of the Learning Resource Center, was plagued by latent construction defects, and, after being used for several years, was demolished and replaced by the present building located nearby.

In 1972, another referendum was passed adding Oak Park and River Forest, Riverside Brookfield, and Ridgewood high school districts to the original three, forming Community College District 504. This district was expanded to its current size in 1974 by the addition of Rosemont and Pennoyer school districts. By 1975, enrollment had grown to nearly 20,000, in-district tuition had increased to US$11 per semester hour, and Triton had become the largest single-campus community college in Illinois. The campus was expanded by the acquisition of the North Avenue Drive-In theater, which closed in 1973. This area, designated the "East Campus" and located across Fifth Avenue from the original ("West") campus, was cleared and used mainly for the construction of athletic facilities, as well as a small auditorium as part of the Collins Center.

== Campus ==
Triton College sits on a 110-acre (45 ha) campus that features electronic classrooms, labs, sports facilities, a library and bookstore, an art gallery and performing arts center, botanical gardens and greenhouses, culinary arts program restaurant and bistro, and the Cernan Earth and Space Center, which is a public planetarium. Recent renovations include the Health Sciences Building, The Student Center Building, and Symonds-Puckett field.

The campus is also the home of Triton Troupers Circus.

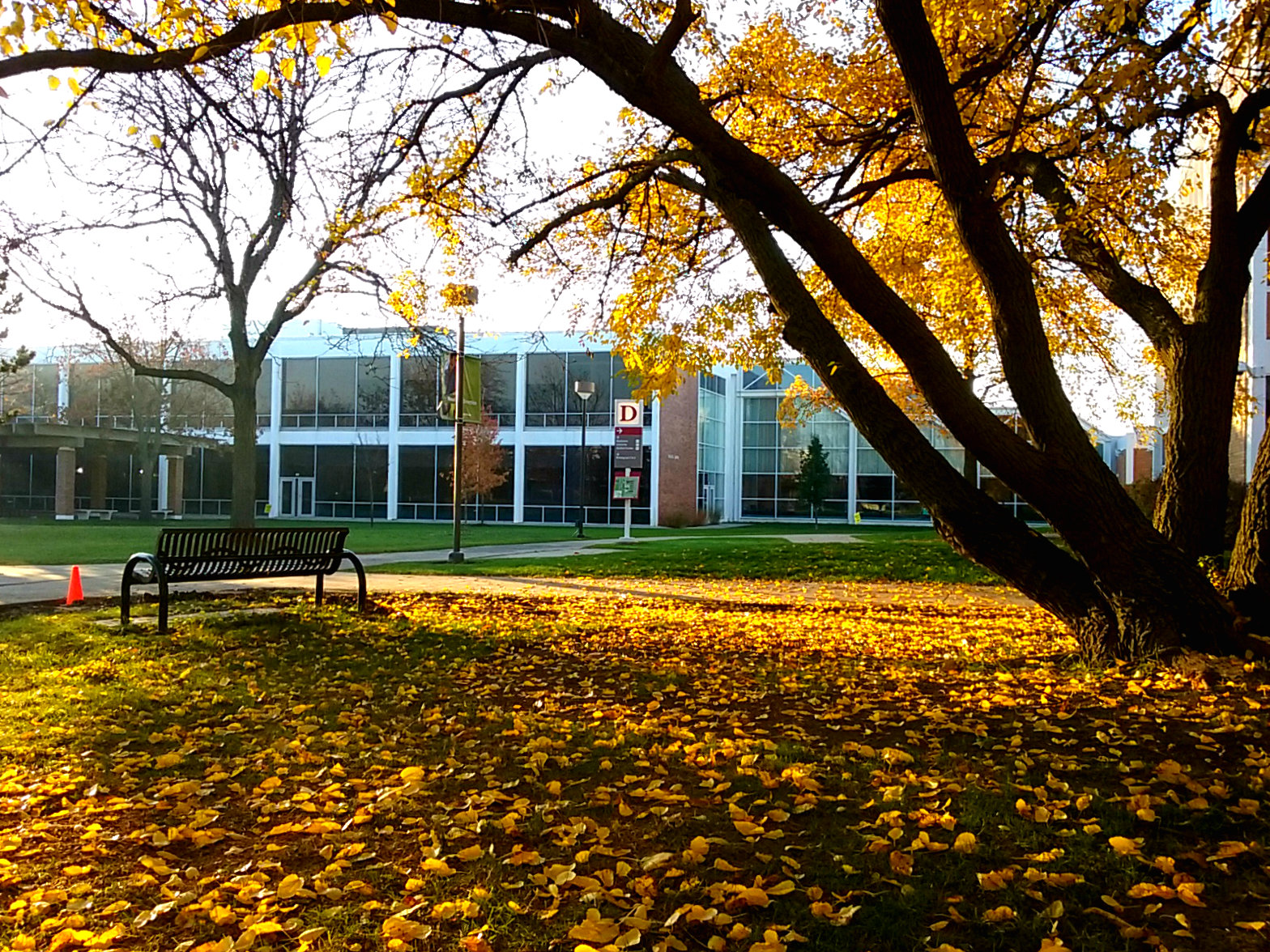

== Academics ==
Triton College facilitates accredited Associate of Arts, Associate of Science, Associate of Fine Arts, and Associate of Applied Science for transfer and career. The institution also offers English as a second language (ESL) and GED classes. Triton College is a member of the Illinois Articulation Initiative and has transfer agreements with universities across the state, such as the University of Illinois. In addition, students can earn bachelor's degrees on Triton's campus from Southern Illinois University, Dominican University, Benedictine University, and others through the University Center. The college also offers the academically rigorous Scholars Program for high achieving incoming freshman.

=== Rankings ===
In 2016, Payscale.com ranked Triton College the top two-year college in Illinois and among the top in the United States according to salaries of its graduates.

== Student life ==
Triton College boasts a diverse majority-minority student body with sizable populations of Hispanic/Latino, white, African American, and Asian students. The college is also a Hispanic-serving institution. About 75% of students are from the inner ring Chicago suburbs, while residents of Chicago and other cities, states, and countries make up the remaining 25%.

Triton students participate in Model UN, Triton Student Association, and many clubs on a variety of interests. Students also participate in the Tritonysia play festival, write and edit the Fifth Avenue Journal, and other artistic endeavors.

=== Athletics ===
Triton competes in NJCAA and is a member of the North Central Community College Conference (N4C). The school mascot is the Trojans. The Men's Basketball team won the N4C conference in 1979–80, 1980–81, 1985–86, 1987–88, 1990-91 1996–97, 2001–02, 2005–06, 2008–09, 2009–10, 2011–12, 2013–14, 2014–15, 2015–16, and 2016–17. In addition, they competed in the 1985–86, 1996–97, 2003–04, 2005–06, 2010–11, and 2015–16, and 2016-2017 NJCAA tournaments.

The Trojans Men's Baseball Team competed in the NJCAA World Series in 1979, 1980, 1982, 1983, 1985, 1990, 1993, 1994, 1995, 1996, and 2000. Former Triton baseball players include MLB Hall of Famer Kirby Puckett.

=== Radio station ===
WRRG 88.9 FM is the student radio station of Triton College. It began broadcasting on March 10, 1975.

== Notable people ==
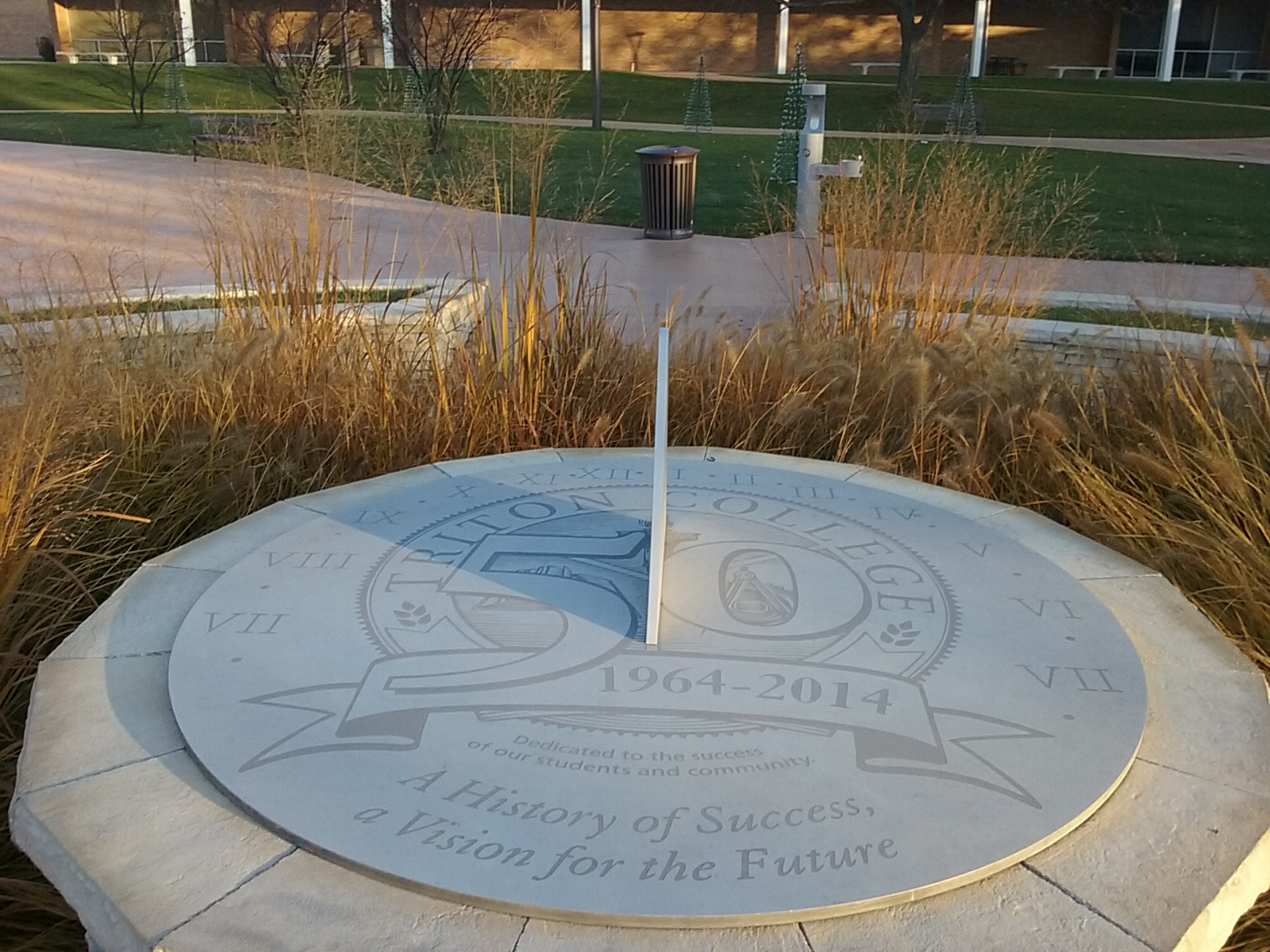
Sundial at the center of the campus

=== Faculty ===
- Paul Martinez Pompa, poet
- Arnie Bernstein, writer and historian

=== Alumni and former students ===
- Baseball Hall of Famer Kirby Puckett
- Fred Hampton, African-American activist and chairman of the Illinois chapter of the Black Panther Party
- Chicago White Sox and Chicago Cubs outfielder Lance Johnson
- Chicago Cubs pitcher Tom Gorzelanny.
- Comedian Kathy Griffin
- Jarvis Brown, former Major League Baseball outfielder who played for the Minnesota Twins, San Diego Padres, Atlanta Braves, and Baltimore Orioles, won the World Series with the Twins.
- GAWNE, rapper, singer, and songwriter
- Olympic wrestler Michael Foy
- Olympic wrestler Derrick Waldroup.
- NFL player Steve Parker.
- Derek Mitchell, shortstop for Baseball Team USA in 1995.
- Illinois state legislator Linda Williamson
- Illinois state legislator Greg Zito.
- Musician and Grammy Award winner Randy Waldman
- Colorado Music Hall of Fame inductee Lannie Garrett
- Comedian and actor Corey Holcomb
