= River Grove, Illinois =

- Village
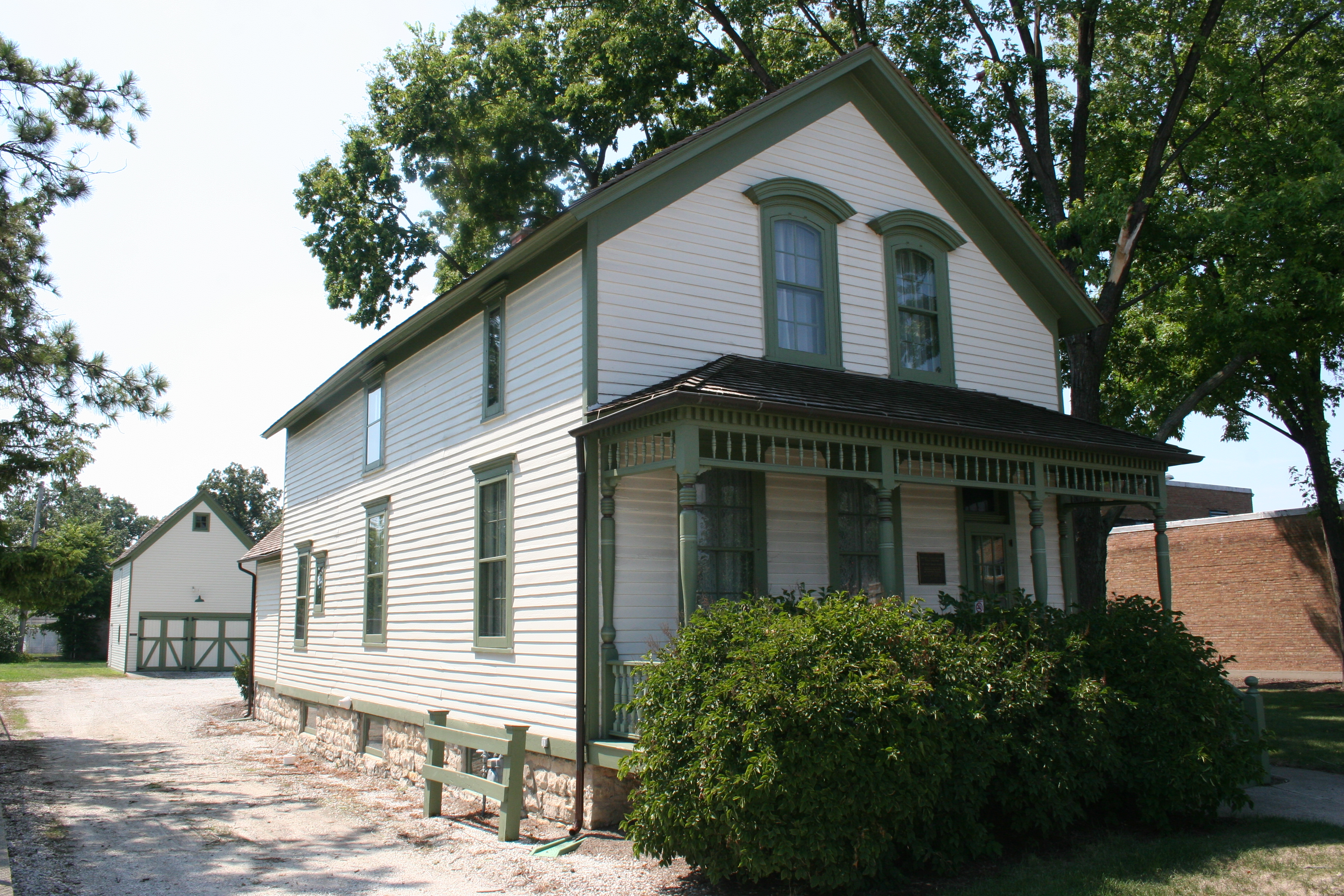
- Dohrmann-Buckman House

- Flag Seal
- Motto: "Village of Friendly Neighbors"
- Location of River Grove in Cook County, Illinois

- Location within Greater Chicago Location within Illinois Location within the United States
- Coordinates: 41°55′33″N 87°50′24″W
- Country: United States
- State: Illinois
- County: Cook
- Township: Leyden

Area
  - Total: 2.39 sq mi (6.19 km^{2})
  - Land: 2.39 sq mi (6.19 km^{2})
  - Water: 0 sq mi (0.00 km^{2})

Population (2020)
  - Total: 10,612
  - Density: 4,438.2/sq mi (1,713.61/km^{2})
- Time zone: UTC−6 (CST)
  - Summer (DST): UTC−5 (CDT)
- ZIP Code: 60171
- Area code: 708
- FIPS code: 17-64343
- Wikimedia Commons: River Grove, Illinois
- Website: rivergroveil.gov

River Grove is a village in Leyden Township, Cook County, Illinois, United States. The population was 10,612 at the 2020 census. It is part of the Chicago metropolitan area.

== History ==
Just as nearby Elmwood Park and Oak Park are named after their historic elm and oak trees, River Grove gets its two-part name first from the community's shallow, muddy Des Plaines River, and second from the majestic groves of American ash trees lining shore of the river's "bottomland." Credit goes to the village's early German and Nordic settlers who, already holding a great reverence for the "mystic ash" through old world traditions, felt that they were home again among the familiar groves of ash trees, "just like the ones they left behind." Up until the modern day extinction event of the American ash tree species 2006–2018, River Grove was the home to Cook County's second-oldest green ash with an estimated age of 240 in the "old growth" Lafrombose Woods, along with several other living examples of locally evolved white, green, black and blue ash types 110–160 years of age scattered around the village. Because the invasive Asian emerald ash borer kills off young trees long before they reach seeding age of 10, scientists theorize that the "Fraxinus/ash" species will no longer be able to germinate continued generations by 2018 within the local woods, or only 12 years after EAB was first discovered in River Grove.

James Kirie (1911–2000), businessman and Illinois state representative, was born in River Grove.

== Geography ==
River Grove is located at 41°55′33″N 87°50′24″W (41.925830, -87.840135). According to the 2010 census, River Grove has a total area of 2.39 square miles (6.19 km^{2}), all land.

== Demographics ==
Historical population
Census	Pop.	Note	%±
1890	287		—
1900	333		16.0%
1910	418		25.5%
1920	464		11.0%
1930	2,741		490.7%
1940	3,301		20.4%
1950	4,839		46.6%
1960	8,464		74.9%
1970	11,465		35.5%
1980	10,368		−9.6%
1990	9,961		−3.9%
2000	10,668		7.1%
2010	10,227		−4.1%
2020	10,612		3.8%
U.S. Decennial Census

=== Racial and ethnic composition ===
River Grove village, Illinois – racial and ethnic composition Note: the US Census treats Hispanic/Latino as an ethnic category. This table excludes Latinos from the racial categories and assigns them to a separate category. Hispanics/Latinos may be of any race.
Race / ethnicity (NH = Non-Hispanic)	Pop. 2000	Pop. 2010	Pop. 2020	% 2000	% 2010	% 2020
White alone (NH)	9,258	7,847	6,609	86.78%	76.73%	62.28%
Black or African American alone (NH)	34	131	202	0.32%	1.28%	1.90%
Native American or Alaska Native alone (NH)	16	18	3	0.15%	0.18%	0.03%
Asian alone (NH)	217	219	232	2.03%	2.14%	2.19%
Pacific Islander alone (NH)	4	4	1	0.04%	0.04%	0.01%
Other race alone (NH)	5	14	34	0.05%	0.14%	0.32%
Mixed race or multiracial (NH)	91	93	184	0.85%	0.91%	1.73%
Hispanic or Latino (any race)	1,043	1,901	3,347	9.78%	18.59%	31.54%
Total	10,668	10,227	10,612	100.00%	100.00%	100.00%

=== 2020 census ===
As of the 2020 census, River Grove had a population of 10,612. The median age was 40.4 years. 19.5% of residents were under the age of 18 and 15.7% of residents were 65 years of age or older. For every 100 females there were 95.2 males, and for every 100 females age 18 and over there were 92.9 males age 18 and over.

100.0% of residents lived in urban areas, while 0.0% lived in rural areas.

There were 4,304 households in River Grove, of which 28.8% had children under the age of 18 living in them. Of all households, 43.8% were married-couple households, 20.3% were households with a male householder and no spouse or partner present, and 29.4% were households with a female householder and no spouse or partner present. About 29.8% of all households were made up of individuals and 12.3% had someone living alone who was 65 years of age or older.

There were 4,482 housing units, of which 4.0% were vacant. The homeowner vacancy rate was 0.9% and the rental vacancy rate was 3.6%.

The population density was 4,438.31 inhabitants per square mile (1,713.64/km^{2}), and the housing unit density was 1,874.53 per square mile (723.76/km^{2}).

=== Demographic estimates ===
There were 2,467 families residing in the village. About 32.26% of households were non-families. The average household size was 3.40 and the average family size was 2.73.

7.1% of residents were from 18 to 24, 29.1% were from 25 to 44, and 27% were from 45 to 64.

=== Income and poverty ===
The median income for a household in the village was $63,193, and the median income for a family was $74,795. Males had a median income of $47,095 versus $31,187 for females. The per capita income for the village was $27,547. About 9.0% of families and 10.0% of the population were below the poverty line, including 15.2% of those under age 18 and 7.0% of those age 65 or over.

== Economy ==
The hot dog stand Gene's & Jude's is located on Grand Avenue and Des Plaines River Road, specializing in a variation of Chicago-style hot dogs. In 2011, in a competition of 64 stands across the country, it was chosen by the magazine Every Day with Rachael Ray and the food blog Serious Eats as the best hot dog in America.

Follett, a multi-national book services company, was based in River Grove until 2014, when the company relocated to Westchester, IL.

== Transportation ==
River Grove has a station on Metra's North Central Service and Milwaukee District West Line, which provide weekday rail service from Chicago Union Station to Antioch and daily service to Elgin, respectively.

Pace provides bus service on multiple routes connecting River Grove to destinations across the region.

== Education ==
Tertiary

- Triton College, site of the Cernan Earth and Space Center planetarium

Public K-12

- River Grove School District 85.5 (operating River Grove Elementary School)
- Elmwood Park High School
- Rhodes School District 84.5 (operating Rhodes Elementary School)

Private K-12

- Saint Cyprian Elementary School of the Roman Catholic Archdiocese of Chicago (closed in 2018)
- Bethlehem Lutheran Elementary School (closed in 2010)
- Guerin College Preparatory High School – scheduled to close permanently after the spring of 2020
