= List of people from Lake Forest, Illinois =

The following list includes notable people who were born or have lived in Lake Forest, Illinois. For a similar list organized alphabetically by last name, see the category page People from Lake Forest, Illinois.

== Arts ==
- Andrew Bird, singer-songwriter
- Sarah Brackett, actress
- Peach Carr, fashion designer; contestant on season 8 of Project Runway
- Wallace Leroy DeWolf, etcher, painter, art collector, and businessman
- Sylvia Shaw Judson, sculptor and teacher; winner of the Logan Prize in 1929 for her sculpture Little Gardener
- Lisel Mueller, poet; winner of the 1997 Pulitzer Prize for poetry
- Rene Romero Schuler, fine arts painter

== Architecture ==
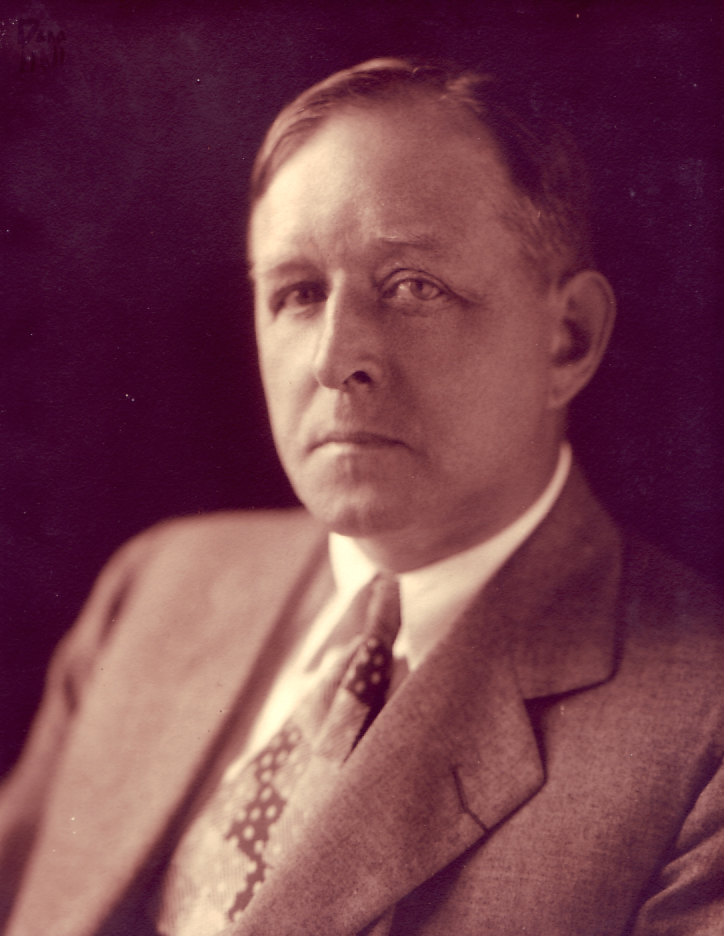
Edward H. Bennett

- Edward H. Bennett, architect and city planner
- Howard Van Doren Shaw, architect; lived in Ragdale

== Business ==
- Andrew Watson Armour III, meatpacking magnate
- J. Ogden Armour, meatpacking magnate (Armour and Company)
- Albert Blake Dick, founder of A.B. Dick Company; licensed autographic printing patents from Thomas Edison; mayor of Lake Forest (1928–1931)
- Grace Durand, businesswoman and owner of Crab Tree Dairy Farm
- Charles B. and John V. Farwell, builders of the Texas State capitol building and founders of the XIT Ranch
- Marshall Field, owner of Marshall Field's (now Macy's)
- Albert Lasker, businessman who played a major role in shaping modern advertising
- Marcus Lemonis, Chairman & CEO Camping World, host of The Profit
- Cyrus H. McCormick, inventor; founder of the McCormick Harvesting Machine Company, which later became International Harvester
- Peter W. Smith, investment banker
- Elizabeth and Richard Uihlein, business people, founders of Uline, conservative donor, and heir
- Percy Wood, United Airlines executive notably injured in his Lake Forest home by a bomb sent from Ted Kaczynski

== Media and writing ==
=== Acting ===
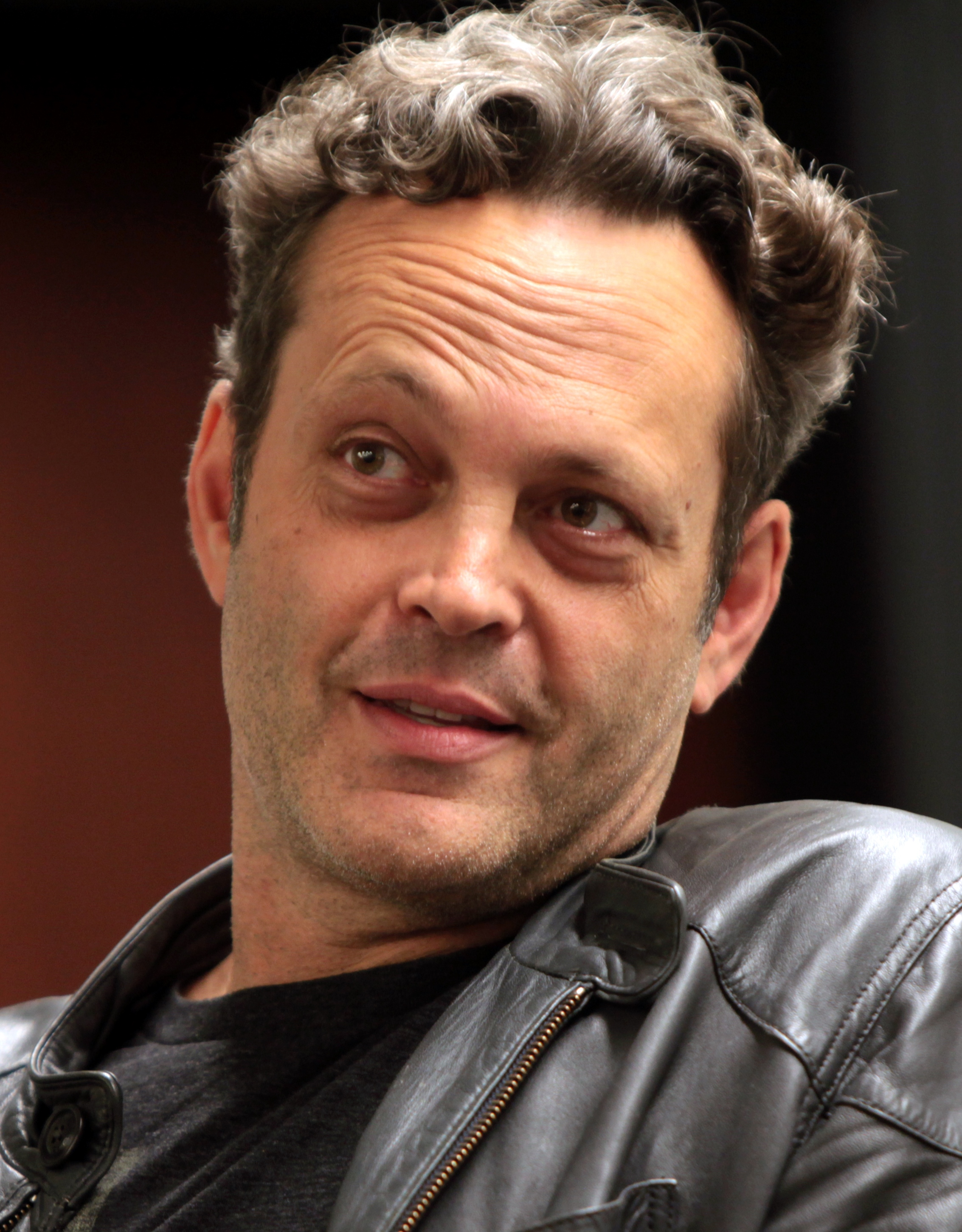
Vince Vaughn

- Kipleigh Brown, actress
- Kristin Cavallari, actress
- Kyle Chandler, actor
- Jay Chandrasekhar, actor, director
- Charlie Finn, actor
- Jean Harlow, actress
- Lauren Holly, actress
- John Mahoney, actor
- Mr. T, actor, wrestler
- Joan Taylor, actress
- Vince Vaughn, actor
- Richard Widmark, actor
- Robin Williams, actor, comedian
- Kathryn Joosten, actress

=== Directing and production ===
- James T. Aubrey, Jr., television and film executive
- John Hughes, writer, director, producer
- Alex Timbers, theater writer and director

=== Journalism ===
- Mary Maher, journalist, trade unionist and feminist
- Bill Schulz, journalist (Fox News)
- Sam Weller, author and journalist

=== Music ===
- Bix Beiderbecke, jazz cornet player and pianist
- Andrew Bird, musician and songwriter
- Mat Devine, lead singer of Chicago-based alternative rock band Kill Hannah

=== Writing ===
- Lacy Crawford, writer
- Dave Eggers, writer
- Beth Ann Fennelly, writer
- Jen Lancaster, writer
- Rebecca Makkai, writer
- Arthur Meeker Jr., novelist

== Politics and law ==
- Joseph E. Anderson (1873−1937), Illinois state legislator and most recent Prohibitionist member of the Illinois General Assembly.
- David N. Barkhausen, Illinois state legislator and politician
- Mary Beattie, Illinois state legislator
- Edward J. Brundage, Illinois Attorney General
- Fredrik Herman Gade, mayor of Lake Forest; diplomat from Norway
- Charles B. Farwell, United States Senator from Illinois (1887–1891) and member of the United States House of Representatives (1871–1876, 1881–1883), cofounder of the Onwentsia Club, owner of XIT Ranch
- Susan Garrett, Illinois Senate state senator representing the 29th District
- Noble Brandon Judah, United States Ambassador to Cuba (1927–1929)
- Robert P. Lamont, United States Secretary of Commerce (1929–1932)
- William Mather Lewis, mayor of Lake Forest (1915–1917); president of George Washington and Lafayette Universities
- Thomas J. Moran, Chief Justice of the Illinois Supreme Court
- William Proxmire, U.S. Senator from Wisconsin
- Judy Baar Topinka, Illinois Comptroller and Illinois State Treasurer
- Pete Wilson, 36th governor of California (1991–1999); United States senator (1983–1991); 29th mayor of San Diego (1971–1983)
- Corrine Wood, 44th lieutenant governor of Illinois

== Sciences ==
- Pamela Darling, library preservation specialist
- Tung Jeong, professor and international leader in the field of holography
- Jim Lovell, astronaut on Gemini 7, Gemini 12, Apollo 8, and Apollo 13; author of Lost Moon
- Karl Patterson Schmidt, herpetologist

== Socialites and modeling ==
- Margaret "Peg" Carry, socialite; daughter of Pullman Company president Edward F. Carry; friend of F. Scott Fitzgerald
- Rose Farwell Chatfield-Taylor, socialite, sportswoman, bookbinder, suffragist, cofounder of Onwentsia Club
- Ginevra King, socialite; inspiration for many female characters in F. Scott Fitzgerald's work, including Daisy Buchanan in The Great Gatsby
- Edith Rockefeller McCormick, socialite
- Prince Rostislav Rostislavovich, descendant of the Russian Imperial dynasty the House of Romanov
- McKey Sullivan, fashion model and winner of America's Next Top Model, Cycle 11

== Sports ==
=== Baseball ===
- Mickey Cochrane, catcher for Philadelphia Athletics and Detroit Tigers in Baseball Hall of Fame
- Caleb Durbin, 3rd baseman for the Boston Red Sox
- Joe Girardi, catcher for the Chicago Cubs, manager of the New York Yankees, broadcaster
- Mabel Holle (1920–2011), third basewoman and outfielder in All-American Girls Professional Baseball League
- Scott Sanderson, All-Star pitcher for eight MLB teams
- Steve Stanicek, designated hitter for Milwaukee Brewers and Philadelphia Phillies

=== Basketball ===
- Bill Cartwright, center and coach for the Chicago Bulls
- Kevin Edwards, shooting guard for the Miami Heat and New Jersey Netsref>Narang, Bobby (February 17, 2017). "Q&A: Former DePaul basketball star, Lake Forest resident Kevin Edwards". Chicago Tribune.</ref>
- Steve Kerr, point guard for the Chicago Bulls, broadcaster, Golden State Warriors head coach
- Scottie Pippen, forward for the Chicago Bulls

=== Driving ===
- Carl Haas, auto racing impresario
- Horst Kwech, champion Trans Am Series driver and race car constructor
- Steve Seligman, stock car racer

=== Football ===
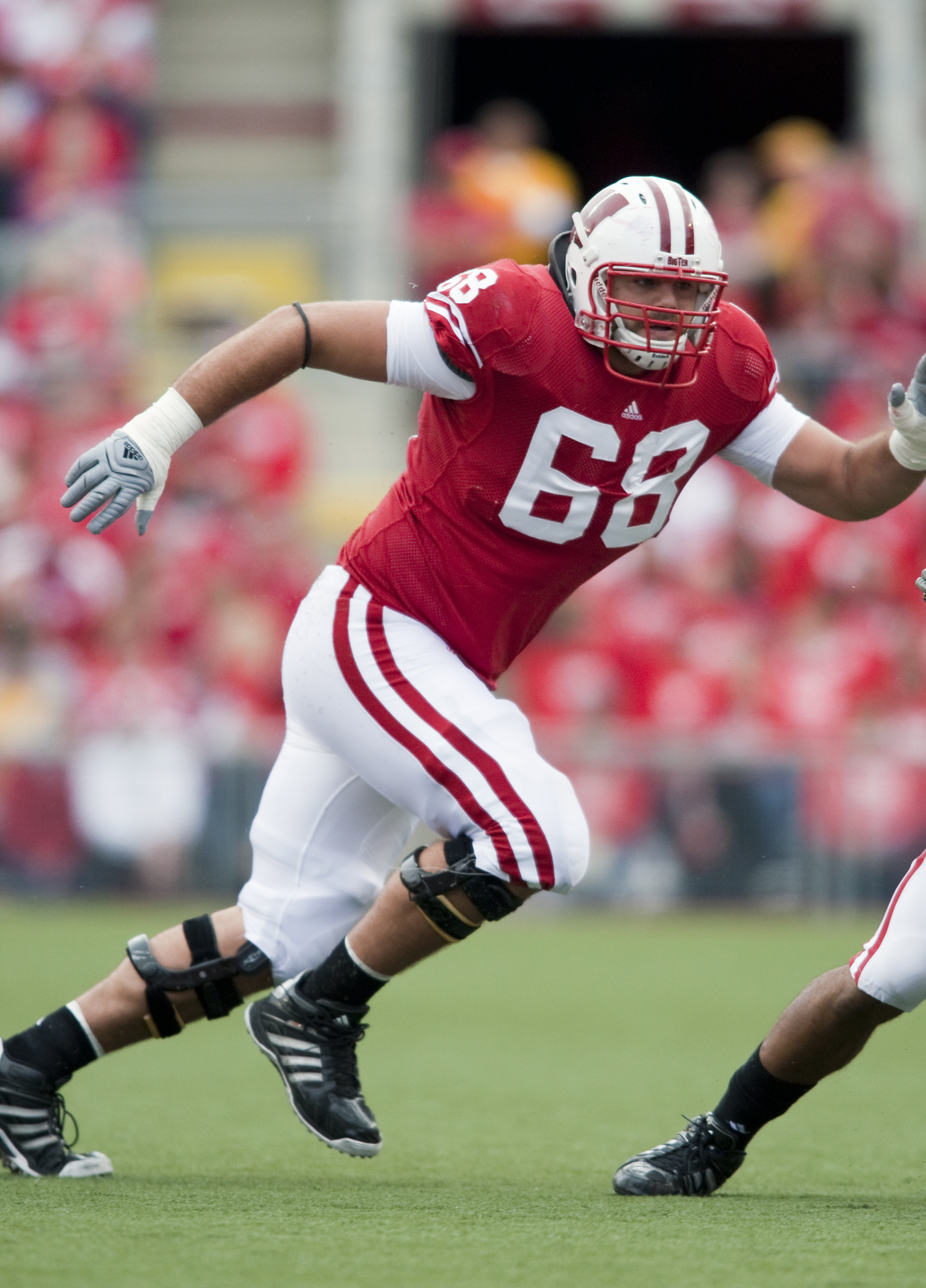
Gabe Carimi

- Drew Butler (born 1989 in Lake Forest), punter for the Pittsburgh Steelers, and Arizona Cardinals
- Gabe Carimi (born 1988 in Lake Forest), offensive lineman for the Chicago Bears, Atlanta Falcons, and Tampa Bay Buccaneers
- Jim Covert, offensive lineman for the Chicago Bears
- Jay Cutler (born 1983), quarterback for the Chicago Bears
- Bobby Douglass, quarterback for the Chicago Bears
- Justin Fields, former quarterback for the Chicago Bears
- George Halas, head coach of the Chicago Bears
- Ben Johnson, head coach for the Chicago Bears
- Cade McNown, quarterback for the Chicago Bears
- Robert Quinn, linebacker for the Chicago Bears
- Lovie Smith, head coach for the Chicago Bears
- Tom Waddle, wide receiver for the Chicago Bears
- Kevin Walter, former NFL wide receiver
- Caleb Williams (born 2001), quarterback for the Chicago Bears
- James O. Williams,"Big Cat", tackle for Chicago Bears and offensive lineman coach for Lake Forest High School

=== Golf ===
- Chip Beck, PGA Tour golfer
- Edith Cummings, golfer; 1924 US Women's Amateur Champion

=== Gymnastics ===
- Nicole Sladkov, Olympic rhythmic gymnast

=== Hockey ===
- Keith Magnuson, defenseman for the Chicago Blackhawks, team captain

=== Swimming ===
- Matt Grevers, Olympic swimmer; silver medalist (2008), gold medalist (2012)

=== Sports journalism ===
- Sarah Spain, radio host and sports reporter, ESPN
- Tim Weigel, sports anchor and reporter
