= Virginia Frederick =

American politician

Virginia Fiester Frederick (née Heise) (December 24, 1916 – May 30, 2010) was an American politician.

Born in Rock Island, Illinois. Frederick received her bachelor's degree from University of Iowa. She lived in Lake Forest, Illinois. Frederick served in the Illinois House of Representatives from 1979 to 1995 and was a Republican.

== Notes ==
Illinois House of Representatives
Preceded by Adeline Geo-Karis	Member of the Illinois House of Representatives from the 31st district 1979–1983; Served alongside: Ronald E. Griesheimer, John S. Matijevich, David N. Barkhausen	Succeeded by Taylor Pouncey
Preceded by Robert C. "Bob" Winchester; James F. "Jim" Rea; C. L. McCormick	Member of the Illinois House of Representatives from the 59th district 1983–1995	Succeeded by Thomas F. Lachner
