= Jim Burns (basketball) =

American basketball player and lawyer (1945–2020)

United States Attorney for the Northern District of Illinois
- In office October 30, 1993 – August 20, 1997
- President: Bill Clinton
- Preceded by: Fred Foreman
- Succeeded by: Scott Lassar

Personal details
- Born: James Burton Burns; September 21, 1945 Quincy, Illinois, U.S.
- Died: December 11, 2020 (aged 75) Wilmette, Illinois, U.S.
- Party: Democratic
- Children: Heather
- Education: Northwestern University (BA, JD)
- Basketball career

Personal information
- Listed height: 6 ft 3 in (1.91 m)
- Listed weight: 195 lb (88 kg)

Career information
- High school: McLeansboro (McLeansboro, Illinois)
- College: Northwestern (1964–1967)
- NBA draft: 1967: 4th round, 34th overall pick
- Drafted by: Chicago Bulls
- Playing career: 1967–1968
- Position: Shooting guard
- Number: 6, 20

Career history
- 1967: Chicago Bulls
- 1967–1968: Dallas Chaparrals

Career highlights
- Third-team All-American – AP, NABC (1967); First-team All-Big Ten (1967)
- Stats at NBA.com
- Stats at Basketball Reference

James Burton Burns (September 21, 1945 – December 11, 2020) was an American lawyer and professional basketball player. He served as the United States District Attorney for the Northern District of Illinois from 1993 until 1997 under President Bill Clinton.

Burns briefly played basketball for the Chicago Bulls and the Dallas Chaparrals. He went on to work as a federal prosecutor from 1971 until 1978 after graduating from the Northwestern University Law School. Burns then was a partner at two Chicago-based law firms until his appointment as US Attorney in 1993.

A member of the Democratic Party, Burns made two attempts for elected office. He was the running mate of Neil Hartigan during the 1990 Illinois gubernatorial election, which they narrowly lost. Burns later resigned as US Attorney to run for Governor of Illinois in 1998, placing fourth of six candidates in the Democratic primary.

== Early life and basketball career ==
A native of Quincy, Illinois, Burns was an all-state player who led McLeansboro High School to a fourth-place finish in the 1962 State Championship Tournament. He then played collegiately for Northwestern University, 1964–67, where he led the team in scoring all three seasons, was both All-American and Academic All-American in 1967, and was All-Big Ten and Academic All-Big Ten in 1966 and '67. He was inducted into the Northwestern Athletics Hall of Fame in 1992.

He was selected by the Chicago Bulls in the fourth round (34th pick overall) of the 1967 NBA draft. He played only three games with the Bulls during the 1967–68 season where he was on the team with fellow McLeansboro native Jerry Sloan. Burns also played for the Dallas Chaparrals (1967–68) in the ABA for 33 games.

== Legal and political careers ==
Following his short professional basketball career, Burns returned to Northwestern, earning his Juris Doctor degree. He first worked as a federal prosecutor from 1971 until 1978, eventually serving as the chief of the criminal litigation division. He subsequently practiced at two Chicago-based law firms as a regulatory partner.

Burns was also active in Democratic politics. He announced his bid for Attorney General of Illinois in the summer of 1989, but he dropped out six weeks later to join Neil Hartigan's ticket as the lieutenant governor candidate. The selection of Burns was called unorthodox, since, at the time, he was a political novice with low name recognition. Hartigan and Burns would go on to lose the 1990 race by a narrow margin to Republican nominee Jim Edgar and his running mate Bob Kustra.

In 1992, he was appointed the US attorney for the Northern District of Illinois by President Bill Clinton. Senator Paul Simon and Mayor Richard M. Daley initially clashed over Burns' appointment. Daley had wanted his former top aide, Richard A. Devine, to be appointed instead of Burns. Burns was eventually confirmed by the US Senate in November 1993.

As US attorney, Burns was the chief prosecutor on a number of high-profile cases. He and his office focused on drug smuggling, political corruption, organized crime, civil rights violations, and white collar financial fraud. He later resigned as the US attorney to launch his 1998 campaign for governor. Despite having the backing of Illinois House Speaker Mike Madigan, Burns, as a late entrant into a crowded race, struggled to gain funding and support. He ultimately finished fourth out of the six candidates in the Democratic primary.

After a return to private practice law, Burns was appointed inspector general by Illinois Secretary of State Jesse White in April 2000. He served as inspector general under White for over 20 years, until his death in 2020.

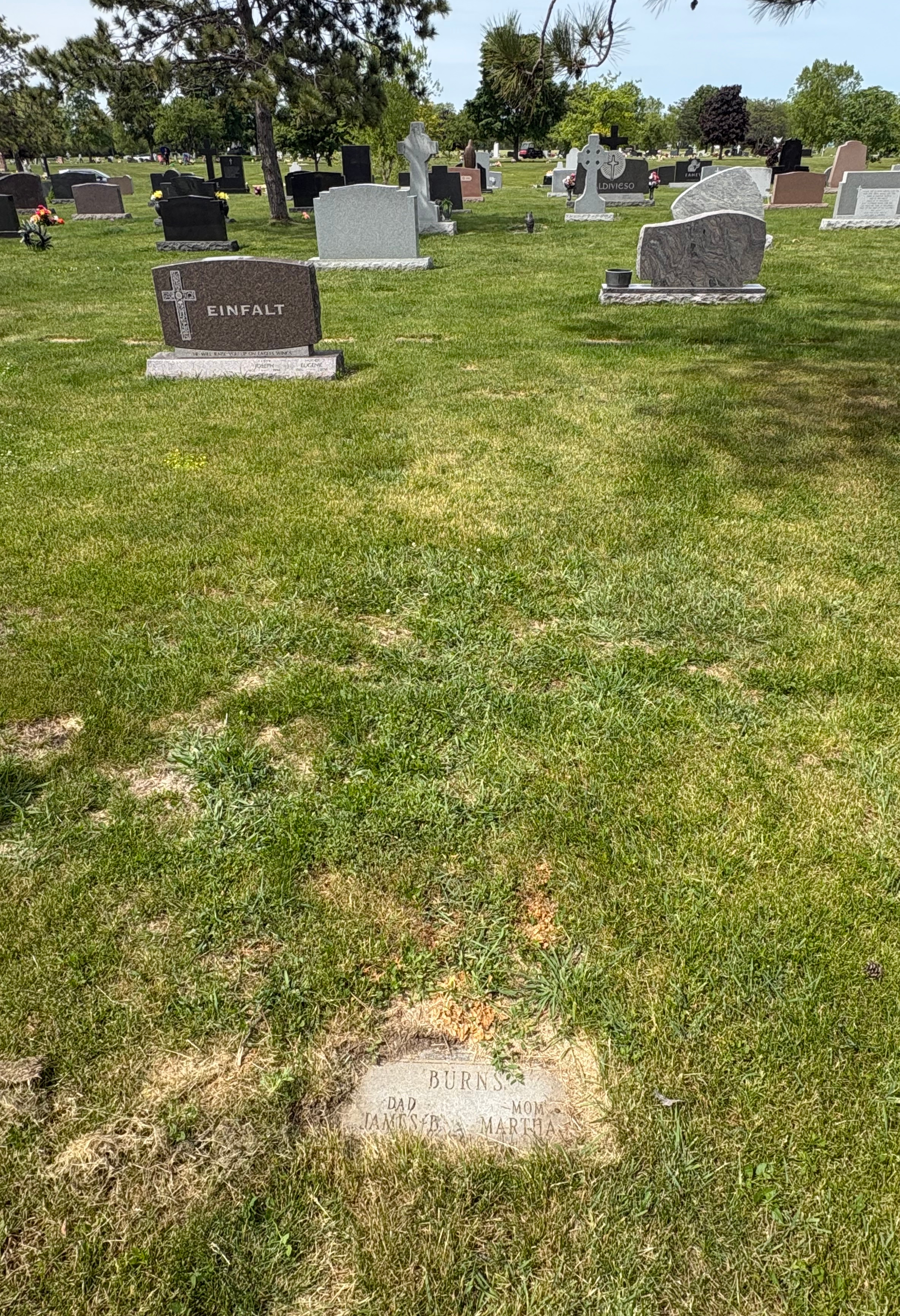
Burns's grave at All Saints Cemetery

== Personal life ==
He is the father of actress Heather Burns. He died on December 11, 2020, and was buried at All Saints Cemetery in Des Plaines.

== Career statistics ==
Legend
GP	Games played	GS	Games started	MPG	Minutes per game
FG%	Field goal percentage	3P%	3-point field goal percentage	FT%	Free throw percentage
RPG	Rebounds per game	APG	Assists per game	SPG	Steals per game
BPG	Blocks per game	PPG	Points per game	**Bold**	Career high

=== NBA/ABA ===
==== Regular season ====
Year	Team	GP	MPG	FG%	3P%	FT%	RPG	APG	PPG
1967–68	Chicago (NBA)	3	3.7	.286	–	–	.7	.3	1.3
1967–68	Dallas (ABA)	**33**	**11.9**	**.380**	.000	**.573**	**1.8**	**.7**	**4.7**
Career		36	11.2	.375	.000	.573	1.7	.7	4.4
