= Toma Gheorghe =

Romanian serial killer

- Born: 16 August 1941 (age 85); Arad, Kingdom of Romania
- Other names: "The Butcher of Arad"; Gheorghe Toma "Tomiţă"
- Convictions: Murder x5 Various convictions for theft Pimping; Threatening a public official
- Penalty: Murder: 25 years imprisonment (1973); 30 years imprisonment (2012); Other offences: Various sentences (thefts, 1958–1994); 3 years imprisonment (pimping); 9 years imprisonment (threats against prosecutor)

Details
- Victims: 5
- Span of crimes: 1973; 1997 – 2003
- Country: Romania
- State: Arad
- Date apprehended: For the last time in fall of 2005

Toma Gheorghe (Note: Media sources have also given his name as Gheorghe Toma. For consistency, this article uses the name Toma Gheorghe, as it is unclear what the correct version of the person's name is.) (born 16 August 1941), known as The Butcher of Arad (Romanian: Măcelarul din Arad), is a Romanian serial killer and thief. Originally convicted of a 1973 double murder and sentenced to 25 years imprisonment, he was pardoned in 1988 and released. Years later, he committed three additional murders in his home city of Arad from 1997 to 2003, for which he was sentenced to 30 years imprisonment.

Due to the multitude of sentences he has served totaling over 50 years, Gheorghe is considered one of Romania's longest-serving prisoners. He is also the country's oldest confirmed and longest-active serial killer.

== Early life ==
Toma Gheorghe was born on 16 August 1941 in Arad, the first surviving child of Gheorghe and Rozalia Gheorghe. Before having him, the couple had had at least nine previous children, most of which had succumbed to diseases such as measles and scarlet fever. Reportedly, Toma was born prematurely and was also expected to die in infancy, but doctors continued treating him on his mother's insistence, allowing him to survive. Two years later, his younger brother, Trudi, was born.

According to an interview he would give later in life, Toma and Trudi got sick when they were very young and had to be hospitalized, an event during which the older boy claimed to have seen a vision of Death disguised as his mother. Throughout his childhood, Toma reportedly witnessed and experienced several disturbing events, such as seeing local Jews sacrificing and having sex with geese, and being beaten by his mother with a rolling pin after he supposedly stabbed his younger brother by accident. Whether these events actually occurred remains unclear.

=== First offenses ===
According to Toma, a major turning point in his life occurred when he was still a young boy. At some point, he and his brother Trudi stole money from their father's suitcase and went out to buy fruit. Once their father learned of this, he beat them and forced them to retrieve the money from wherever they had spent it. After this event, the father sent them to numerous orphanages across the country, but their mother retrieved them both and brought them back to Arad every time.

At age 15, Toma was arrested for stealing a pigeon breast from one of the orphanages he was staying at. He was later convicted and sentenced to six months imprisonment at the Ocnele Mari Prison, where he was forced to work in the prison workshop. Almost immediately after his release, he was arrested for being an accomplice in another theft, which he blamed on a friend that supposedly stolen money from his aunt and pinned the crime on Toma. He was released after serving a year in prison.

=== Death of father and young adulthood ===
When he was around 17 years old, Toma's father passed away. Once he learned of this, he returned home from a vocational school in Drobeta-Turnu Severin to stay with his mother and brother for a while. During this stay, Toma's mother told him that his father had returned as a ghost and was watching over them. While he personally did not believe this, Toma was devoted to his mother and concerned about her well-being.

To those around him, Toma Gheorghe appeared to be a pleasant young man who greatly cared about the way he dressed, was obsessed with cleanliness, and was an amateur chess player registered with the Romanian Chess Federation. Despite this positive reputation, he continued to commit thefts, receiving a third sentence for stealing a box full of money from a driving school and spending it on a bicycle. He received a 5-year sentence for this, but was released after spending 3 years and 4 months behind bars. Gheorghe then found work as a painter at the Arad Carriage Factory, where he once tricked two colleagues into drinking paint thinner, lying to them that it was juice – both men were hospitalized, but Gheorghe did not face any apparent repercussions for this incident.

Later on, Gheorghe would state in an interview his personal belief that his mother cursed him to die in prison. This belief stemmed from an incident in the late 1960s, when he took down several icons to put up his chess diplomas. Once his mother saw this, she became distraught and told him that he was disrespecting the Saints, supposedly bringing a curse upon himself that would lead him to end up in prison.

=== Marriage and children ===
In 1968, the 27-year-old Gheorghe married a 19-year-old peasant woman, much to the objections of her parents. As they frequently quarreled, Gheorghe took her away from them to his home in Arad. The marriage was unhappy, as Gheorghe was verbally abusive and often made her cry.

The couple had their first child, Rozalia, in 1969. Two years later, they had another daughter, Hortenzia, known affectionately by the nickname "Tenzi".

== Double murder ==
In order to financially support his family, Gheorghe also worked as a house painter around Arad, which is how he got into contact with 67-year-old Petre Pretorian, a retired Army colonel who lived with his 56-year-old wife, Felicia. On the morning of 13 August 1973, Gheorghe went to the Pretorian household to retrieve a plastic paint bucket he had forgotten there, but found that nobody was home. He returned to the house that same evening and explained why he was there, only for Petre to supposedly snap at him for no apparent reason. Allegedly, while he was searching for the bucket, Gheorghe overheard Petre insulting him, causing him to become very agitated.

He then retrieved a small axe he had on his bicycle, after which he and Petre went to the basement to search for the bucket. The moment they entered, Gheorghe asked Pretorian about why he insulted him. When Pretorian repeated the insult, Gheorghe proceeded to strike him several times with the axe, accidentally hitting the ceiling in the process. The noise alerted Felicia, who got up to see what was going on, only to be struck with a fatal blow to the head with the axe. Gheorghe then left the murder weapon next to the refrigerator, jumped out of the kitchen window, and went home.

He was arrested three days later, after his fingerprints were found on the axe handle. After undergoing a forensic psychiatric examination, Gheorghe was judged to be sane and able to stand trial. While he initially faced the death penalty for the double murder, his younger brother wrote a plea to Nicolae Ceaușescu to have the sentence reduced, which was granted. As a result, Gheorghe was convicted in April 1974 and sentenced to 25 years imprisonment.

During his incarceration, Gheorghe's wife divorced him and forbid him from seeing their children, while his own mother passed away. During the mid-1980s, his older daughter Rozalia married at age 15 and moved away to another city.

=== Pardon, and life after release ===
In February 1988, Gheorghe's sentence was commuted after Nicolae Ceaușescu issued a blanket pardon to numerous inmates serving long prison sentences. After his release, he moved in with his younger brother Trudi, who was working as a car mechanic. However, this did not last long, as Trudi died a few months later from acute hemorrhagic pancreatitis caused by long-term alcohol abuse.

In 1989, Gheorghe was briefly reunited with the still-teenage Tenzi after the latter was kicked out of the house by her maternal grandfather for being impregnated by someone at her school. The pair stayed together until Tenzi had an abortion, after which she returned to her grandparents. Gheorghe stated that he was a witness to the violence during the Romanian revolution, but remained neutral to the conflict and kept a low profile to avoid any trouble.

Following the collapse of the Communist regime, Gheorghe brought Tenzi to his home, and the pair started a small-time business selling imported goods from Hungary at the market in Arad.

=== Violent outbursts ===
In the early 1990s, Gheorghe started exhibiting several signs of violent behavior. The most prominent of these was against animals, as he had a self-professed hatred of cats, which manifested in him grabbing them by their tails and spinning them around whenever he came across one. In two notable incidents, he did this to his neighbors' pregnant cat after supposedly seeing it steal a baby pigeon, and repeatedly beat up his pet sheep dog Rex after it scratched his sofa.

Aside from the animal abuse, Gheorghe was detained for getting into an altercation with a younger man. According to his version of events, Gheorghe was kicked in the head by the man after he got in front of his car. Angered by this, Gheorghe got on top of his car and attempted to break his windshield. No charges were pressed against either of them, and the case was soon dropped.

== Serial murders ==
=== Hortenzia "Tenzi" Toma ===
In December 1994, Gheorghe and a friend of his daughter were arrested for stealing a TV from the yard of a German businessman. For his role in the crime, he was sentenced to 3 years imprisonment. During his incarceration, Gheorghe was repeatedly visited by Tenzi, who attempted to convince him to move out once he got out of prison. Gheorghe refused each and every time, and when he was released from prison in March 1997, he moved back in with her.

Tenzi continued to insist that he move out, but when Gheorghe refused, she contacted a local court in an attempt to get him evicted. When he learned of this, in mid-July 1997, Gheorghe woke up his daughter to have another discussion about the matter with her. The talk quickly turned into an argument, during which Gheorghe punched her twice in the face. He then grabbed a meat tenderizer and hit her multiple times on the head. Tenzi begged him to stop and for Gheorghe to call an ambulance – at first, he appeared willing to do so and went into another room. Using the opportunity, Tenzi went to the balcony in an attempt to either flee or call for help, but was caught and had her head slammed onto the balcony's tiles. Gheorghe then sat on top of her, waiting until he was sure she had succumbed to her injuries. That same evening, he beheaded and dismembered the body with a serrated knife, then disposed of the remains by dumping them in a canal running along the Mureș river.

Days after her disappearance, Gheorghe claimed that he thought that she had gone to Germany. He managed to convince his ex-wife and those around him that was indeed the case, and in 2002, he sold the apartment. The only object that he kept was a yellow carpet, which he gave to a prostitute he was acquainted with.

=== Liliana "Lili" Bonţoiu ===
Shortly after murdering his daughter, Gheorghe rekindled his relationship with 31-year-old Liliana "Lili" Bonţoiu, an ex-girlfriend of his. They had initially met in 1988, while he was still in prison, but had broken up around 1994, when Bonţoiu had to be hospitalized after suffering a beating at the hands of Gheorghe. He managed to somehow convince Bonţoiu to pretend to be his daughter and use her ID so he could liquidate Tenzi's bank account. Bonţoiu suspected that Gheorghe had murdered his daughter, and had even threatened to expose his crime to the police after an argument.

On the night of 13 February 1998, Gheorghe and Bonţoiu were sleeping together at his apartment when he suddenly remembered her threat from before. Gheorghe then proceeded to strangle Bonţoiu to death, then grabbed the meat tenderizer and hit her multiples times on the head with it. He then moved the body to the bathroom, where he dismembered it in a similar manner to Tenzi and later dumped the remains into the Mureș canal. Whenever people asked him about had happened to her, Gheorghe lied to them that she had gone away to either the countryside or Turkey, and that they had broken off all contact.

While he was considered the prime suspect in both disappearances by the authorities, Gheorghe was not arrested at the time due to a lack of strong evidence to indict him. However, in the fall of 1999, he was arrested for pimping and sentenced to 3 years in prison. He served his sentence in full and was released in June 2002, whereupon he resumed his pimping activities.

=== Vitorio "Aldo" Rinaldi ===
On 20 July 2003, Gheorghe stabbed to death 73-year-old Vitorio Rinaldo "Aldo" Rinaldi, a retired Italian businessman and alleged pimp who lived in Arad. His body was found by his landlord on Stefan Augustin Doinas Street on 24 July, who immediately notified the police. An autopsy concluded that Rinaldi had been stabbed more than 20 times in the torso, neck, and head. Due to the fact that Rinaldi frequented the social circles of various female prostitutes and gay men, police initially believed that the killer was someone previously acquainted with him.

Gheorghe later explained that on the day of the murder, he had decided to visit Rinaldi and discuss some of the new young women they had been pimping out. At some point, Rinaldi said that he had the prettier women, angering Gheorghe. While his friend was making coffee on the stove, Gheorghe grabbed a penknife he always carried on him and struck him on the back of the head. Rinaldi fell down to the ground, whereupon Gheorghe continued stabbing him repeatedly. Once he was done, he grabbed a towel and a knife from the drawer, dropping the knife at Rinaldi's feet to confuse the police. He then washed his hands and left the towel in the sink to wash away any potential evidence.

=== Identification, flight, and capture ===
While investigating the Rinaldi murder, officers noticed traces of blood that were later determined to belong to the perpetrator. While they were examining it, Gheorghe fled Romania and moved to Paris, France. During his stay there, he sent death threats to prosecutor Codrin Gavra – the man who had first arrested him for pimping in 1999. In these letters, Gheorghe threatened to chop him into pieces and that Gavra would not be able to sign arrest warrants for long.

Following a tip from the Romanian authorities, French police arrested Gheorghe and soon after deported him from the country. Upon his extradition to Romania, Gheorghe was detained at the Rahova Penitentiary, where he was ordered to serve an eight-year sentence for the death threats against Gavra.

== Confessions, trial, and imprisonment ==
=== Confessions ===
While serving his sentence, Gheorghe bragged to another inmate about the murders. The inmate then reported this information to the authorities, who charged Gheorghe with the Rinaldi murder, proving that he was indeed the killer after his DNA was matched to the blood found at the crime scene.

Following his arrest, Gheorghe confessed to all three murders and indicated that he wanted to reveal where he had disposed of Tenzi and Bonţoiu's remains. Investigators focused their searches on a bridge along Cocorilor Street, where Gheorghe claimed to have disposed of the bodies, but were unable to locate anything. The searches got the attention of the locals, most of whom expressed outrage at the crimes and shouted that Gheorghe should be hanged.

An investigation later concluded that it was highly unlikely that any remains could be located due to the passage of time. Despite this, Gheorghe was charged with both murders after splotches of blood found on the yellow carpet he had sold to the prostitute were confirmed to belong to Tenzi.

=== Trial ===
By the late 2000s, Gheorghe was charged with the three murders, to which he readily admitted and requested a speedy trial. During the proceedings, Gheorghe refused to hire a lawyer and repeatedly asked to be tried in absentia. His latter request was denied automatically, as the magistrate noted that the evidence must be presented and that the witnesses had to be heard.

On 14 June 2012, Gheorghe was convicted on all counts and sentenced to 30 years imprisonment. Regarding the charges, he was sentenced to 25 years for the murder of Rinaldi and another 25 for the murders of Tenzi and Bonţoiu, but the sentences for the latter two were merged into the Rinaldi sentence to form a total of 30 years imprisonment. He was ineligible to receive a life sentence due to the fact that he was tried under the old Criminal Code, which stated that the maximum available sentence for people aged over 60 was 30 years imprisonment.

=== Imprisonment ===
Since his conviction, Gheorghe has been incarcerated in several facilities around the country, with his most recent location being the Dej Penitentiary Hospital. After his transfer there in 2022, he started filing applications for early release on the grounds that he had served the required minimum for parole eligibility, that he had medical issues, and that the prison conditions were inadequate.

All of these appeals were denied by the courts, with his final appeal being rejected on 10 October 2024, finalizing his sentence. In their decision, the judges stated that despite his old age, Gheorghe still posed a danger to the public due to his aggressive behavior, lack of remorse, and open threats to "take revenge" on those who had put him behind bars.

== See also ==
- List of serial killers by country
- List of murder convictions without a body
