= 1998 Illinois gubernatorial election =

- November 3, 1998
- Turnout: 49.72% ▼1.05 pp
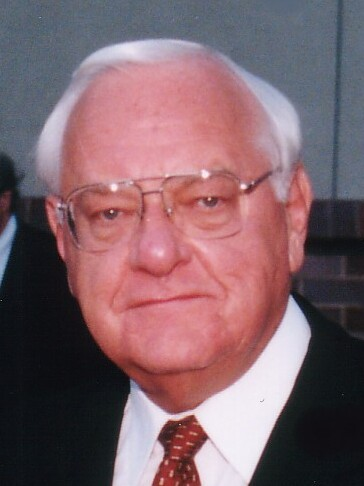

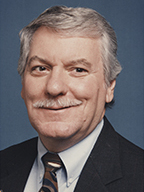
Nominee	George Ryan	Glenn Poshard
Party	Republican	Democratic
Running mate	Corinne Wood	Mary Lou Kearns
Popular vote	1,714,094	1,594,191
Percentage	51.03%	47.46%
- Ryan: 40–50% 50–60% 60–70% 70–80% Poshard: 50–60% 60–70% 70–80% 80–90%
Governor before election
Jim Edgar
Republican
Elected Governor
George Ryan
Republican

The 1998 Illinois gubernatorial election took place on November 3, 1998. Incumbent Republican Governor Jim Edgar did not run for a third term in office. Republican nominee George Ryan, the Illinois Secretary of State, narrowly won the election against Democratic Congressman Glenn Poshard. Ryan's victory extended the Republican Party's gubernatorial winning streak to seven consecutive elections, while his running mate, state Representative Corinne Wood, became the first female lieutenant governor in Illinois history.

The race was notable for its atypical geographic and ideological coaltions, which defied traditional partisan boundaries. Ryan, who supported some gun control measures and LGBTQ rights, campaigned as a moderate, socially liberal Republican, while Poshard, who opposed abortion and gun control, ran as a fiscally progressive, socially conservative Democrat. With the Democratic nominee to the right of the Republican nominee on many social issues, traditional partisan coalitions were reshaped. Poshard overwhelmingly carried socially conservative Southern Illinois, while Ryan won the socially liberal Chicago metropolitan area by a large margin and made signifcant inroads among Chicago's "lakefront liberals." Ultimately, in the close election, Ryan's margins in suburban Cook County and the collar counties proved too large for Poshard to overcome.

== Background ==
The primaries and general elections coincided with those for federal elections (Senate and House), as well as those for other state offices. The election was part of the 1998 Illinois elections.

For the primaries, turnout for the gubernatorial primaries was 24.58%, with 1,658,296 votes cast and turnout for the lieutenant gubernatorial primaries was 19.76% with 1,333,446 votes cast. For the general election, turnout was 49.72%, with 3,358,705 votes cast. Due to Poshard's more conservative social positions he carried the reliably Republican downstate, while Ryan's liberal social policies led him to carry the more Democratic Chicago area.

== Democratic primaries ==
=== Governor ===
==== Candidates ====
- Larry Burgess
- Jim Burns, former United States attorney for the Northern District of Illinois (1993–97) and 1990 nominee for lieutenant governor
- Roland Burris, former Illinois attorney general (1991–95) and 1994 candidate for governor
- Maurice Horton
- Glenn Poshard, U.S. representative from Carterville
- John Schmidt, former United States associate attorney general (1994–97)

==== Declined ====
- Neil Hartigan, former Illinois attorney general (1983–91), lieutenant governor of Illinois (1973–77), and 1990 nominee for governor

==== Results ====
Gubernatorial primary results by county Poshard: Poshard—30–40%; Poshard—40–50%; Poshard—50–60%; Poshard—60–70%; Poshard—70–80%; Poshard—80–90%; Poshard—90–100%; Burris: Burris—40–50%; Schmidt: Schmidt—30–40%; Schmidt—40–50%; Schmidt—50–60%

Democratic gubernatorial primary results
Party	Candidate	Votes	%
Democratic	Glenn Poshard	357,342	37.60
Democratic	Roland Burris	290,393	30.56
Democratic	John R. Schmidt	236,309	24.87
Democratic	Jim Burns	55,233	5.81
Democratic	Larry Burgess	6,075	0.64
Democratic	Maurice Horton	4,955	0.52
Total votes		950,307	100.00

=== Lieutenant governor ===
==== Candidates ====
Lieutenant gubernatorial primary results by county Kearns: 50–60%; 60–70%; 70–80%; 80–90%; Quinn: 50–60%

- Mary Lou Kearns, Kane County coroner
- Pat Quinn, former Illinois treasurer

Democratic lieutenant gubernatorial primary results
Party	Candidate	Votes	%
Democratic	Mary Lou Kearns	391,373	50.09
Democratic	Pat Quinn	389,905	49.91
Total votes		781,278	100

== Republican primaries ==
=== Governor ===
==== Candidates ====
- George Ryan, Illinois secretary of state
- Chad Koppie, perennial candidate and conservative activist

==== Results ====
Republican gubernatorial primary results
Party	Candidate	Votes	%
Republican	George Ryan	608,940	86.08
Republican	Chad Koppie	98,466	13.92
Total votes		707,406	100.00

=== Lieutenant governor ===
==== Candidates ====
- Corinne Wood, state representative from Barrington

==== Results ====
Republican lieutenant gubernatorial primary results
Party	Candidate	Votes	%
Republican	Corrine G. Wood	551,580	100
Total votes		551,580	100

== Reform primary ==
=== Governor ===
==== Candidates ====
- Lawrence Redmond

==== Results ====
Reform gubernatorial primary results
Party	Candidate	Votes	%
Reform	Lawrence Redmond	583	100.00
Total votes		583	100.00

=== Lieutenant governor ===
==== Candidates ====
- Phyllis Nirchi

==== Results ====
Reform lieutenant gubernatorial primary results
Party	Candidate	Votes	%
Reform	Philomena "Phyllis" Nirchi	588	100
Total votes		588	100

== General election ==
=== Candidates ===
- Glenn Poshard, U.S. representative from Carterville
  - Running mate: Mary Lou Kearns, Kane County coroner
- Lawrence Redmond (Reform)
  - Running mate: Phyllis Nirchi
- George Ryan, Illinois secretary of state (Republican)
  - Running mate: Corinne Wood, state representative from Barrington

=== Polling ===
Poll source	Date(s) administered	Sample size (Note: Key: A – all adults RV – registered voters LV – likely voters V – unclear)	Margin of error	George Ryan (R)	Glenn Poshard (D)	Other / undecided (Note: Calculated by taking the difference of 100% and all other candidates combined.)
Harris Insights & Analytics	October 30, 1998	847	—	55%	41%	4%
Zogby Interactive/JZ Analytics	October 29, 1998	703	—	51%	37%	12%
Richard Day Research Inc.	October 27, 1998	712	—	56%	35%	9%
Mason-Dixon Polling & Strategy	October 24–26, 1998	813 (LV)	± 3.5%	48%	37%	15%
Harris Insights & Analytics	October 20, 1998	1,209	—	55%	37%	8%
KRC/Communications Research	October 20, 1998	400	—	44%	42%	14%
KRC Communications Research (Note: Poll sponsored by the Chicago Sun-Times & WBBM-TV)	October 19–20, 1998	400 (LV)	± 5.0%	44%	42%	14%
Market Shares Corp.	October 19, 1998	1,099	—	49%	34%	17%
WCIA-TV	October 14, 1998	401	—	58%	32%	10%
Mason-Dixon Polling & Strategy	October 10–12, 1998	830 (LV)	± 3.5%	51%	36%	13%
Market Shares Corporation	October 3–6, 1998	1,099 (LV)	± 3.0%	52%	31%	17%
Mason-Dixon Polling & Strategy	September 11–14, 1998	811 (LV)	± 3.5%	50%	38%	12%
KRC Communications Research	September 8–10, 1998	400 (LV)	± 4.8%	52%	34%	14%
Zogby International (Note: Poll sponsored by the St. Louis Post-Dispatch)	August 31 – September 1, 1998	726 (LV)	± 4.0%	47%	37%	16%
Market Share Corp.	August 11–17, 1998	1,109 (RV)	± 3.0%	51%	30%	19%
Mason-Dixon Polling & Strategy	July 10–13, 1998	807 (LV)	± 3.5%	44%	37%	19%
University of Illinois at Chicago	June 9 – July 3, 1998	465 (LV)	± 5.0%	46%	39%	13%
Mason-Dixon Polling & Strategy	March 8–10, 1998	831 (LV)	± 3.5%	48%	26%	26%
Mason-Dixon Polling & Strategy	February 6–9, 1998	804 (RV)	± 3.5%	50%	26%	24%

=== Results ===
Illinois gubernatorial election, 1998
Party	Candidate	Votes	%	±%
Republican	George Ryan / Corinne Wood	1,714,094	51.03%	−12.85%
Democratic	Glenn Poshard / Mary Lou Kearns	1,594,191	47.46%	+13.02%
Reform	Lawrence Redmond / Phyllis Nirchi	50,372	1.50%	
Write-ins		48	0.00%	
Majority		119,903	3.57%	−25.87%
Turnout		3,358,705	49.72%	
Republican hold		Swing		

== See also ==
- List of governors of Illinois

== Notes ==
Partisan clients
