= Roger A. Keats =

American politician and businessman

Member of the Illinois Senate from the 29th district
- In office January 1979 – January 1993
- Preceded by: Brad Glass
- Succeeded by: Grace Mary Stern

Member of the Illinois House of Representatives from the 1st district
- In office December 1976 – January 1979
- Preceded by: Brian Duff
- Succeeded by: Mary Jeanne Hallstrom

Personal details
- Born: August 12, 1948 (age 78) Cleveland, Ohio
- Party: Republican
- Education: University of Michigan
- Profession: politician, businessman

Roger A. Keats (born August 12, 1948) is an American politician and businessman.

Keats was born in Cleveland, Ohio. He served in the United States Army from 1972 to 1974. He received his bachelor's degree from University of Michigan. He received his master's degree from University of Illinois {ref} Illinois Blue Book, page 96} He worked in the banking business and started Gallatan National a construction and civil engineer business. He lived in Wilmette, Illinois. At various points in his early career, Keats was a legislative assistant in Washington D.C. He also served as the Republican Presidential Campaign Coordinator in Northern Illinois during 1972 general election.

In the 1976 general election, Republican incumbent Brian Duff opted to run for a judgeship in the Cook County Circuit Court. Keats was elected as one of three members, with John Porter and Harold Katz, from the 1st district to serve in the 80th General Assembly. Duff resigned before the end of the 79th General Assembly to assume his role as a judge. Local Republican leaders appointed Representative-elect Keats to the Illinois House to serve during the veto session of the 79th General Assembly. Keats served in the Illinois House of Representatives from 1976 to 1979. In 1977, incumbent Senator Brad Glass sought the Republican nomination for Illinois Treasurer. In the 1978 general election, Republican Keats defeated Democratic candidate Cathleen Quinn O'Rourke to succeed Glass in the Illinois' Senate District 1. He then served in the Illinois Senate from 1979 to 1993. After the 1992 Legislative Reapportionment, in the 1992 general election, Keats lost the newly drawn Senate District 29. The District was carried by significant margins by both President Elect Bill Clinton (D) and US Senator Elect Carol Mosely Braun (D-Ill) {ref}Cook County, Illinois Clerk's Office official Electoral Records for the 1992 General Election to Democratic State Representative Grace Mary Stern. Illinois swung heavily to the Democrats in 1992 {ref}Illinois Blue Book, Illinois General Election, November 3, 1992, Vote for United States President, Summary of General Vote} Illinois

After his Legislative Tenure, Keats worked for securities firm Morgan Stanley in Winnetka, Illinois. In 1995, he was appointed to the Illinois International Port District by Governor Jim Edgar. During the 2008 Republican Party presidential primaries, Keats worked on behalf of the presidential campaign of former U.S. Senator Fred Thompson serving as a congressional district chair for Illinois's 10th congressional district. In 1989, Keats, a strong Conservative was Honored by Rev. Jesse Jackson and Operation PUSH and was an Honoree for Black History Month for 2009 {ref}Cook County Bar Association Journal, Fall, 2009]], In 2010, Keats was the Republican nominee for President of the Cook County Board of Commissioners. In 2011, Keats and his wife Kristina, moved to Dripping Springs, Texas. In 2026, former Senator Keats was again an Honoree for Black History Month {ref} Cook County Bar Association Journal Summer, 2026]
