= Scott Fawell =

American politician

Scott Fawell was the Chief of Staff to Republican Illinois Governor George Ryan, who would later be arrested in an investigation entitled Operation Safe Road, which resulted in Ryan being sentenced to more than five years in prison on federal corruption charges that included extortion, money laundering, racketeering, bribery, and tax fraud.

Fawell himself served time in prison after Ryan's term as governor ended, convicted on federal charges of racketeering and fraud was sentenced to six years and six months.

Andrea Coutretsis Prokos, who was Fawell's assistant and girlfriend, pleaded guilty to perjury and received 4 months in prison in the same case.
