= Grace Mary Stern =

American politician

Member of the Illinois Senate from the 29th district
- In office 1993–1995
- Preceded by: Roger A. Keats
- Succeeded by: Kathy Parker

Member of the Illinois House of Representatives from the 58th district
- In office 1985–1993
- Preceded by: Daniel M. Pierce
- Succeeded by: Jeff Schoenberg (renumbered)

Personal details
- Born: Grace Mary Dain; July 10, 1925 Holyoke, Massachusetts, U.S.
- Died: May 17, 1998 (aged 72) Highland Park, Illinois, U.S.
- Party: Democratic
- Spouse: Herbert Stern
- Profession: Politician

Grace Mary Stern (née Dain; July 10, 1925 – May 17, 1998) was an American Democratic politician who served in both houses of the Illinois legislature, but was unsuccessful in her 1982 run for Lieutenant Governor, which would have made her the first woman in Illinois history to hold elected statewide office.

== Early and family life ==
Born in Holyoke, Massachusetts, Stern attended Wellesley College. She married Herbert (Hub) Stern and helped raise ten children: a daughter, Ann Dain; three sons, Peter Suber, Tom Suber, and Jack Suber; a stepdaughter, Gwen Stern; two stepsons, Bob Stern and Hub Stern III; and three foster children, Joann Shimizu Sweet, Mark Shimizu, and Leonard Gowers.

== Career ==
She raised her family in Highland Park, Illinois, and began her political career in 1966 as assistant township supervisor for Deerfield Township, Illinois. With a campaign slogan "Not one of the boys", Stern was elected to the Lake County, Illinois Board, serving from 1967-70. In 1970, she became the first Democrat to win election to countywide office in Lake County since the American Civil War, and served as the Lake County clerk from 1970 to 1982.

Stern became the Democratic nominee for Lieutenant Governor in 1982, but she and the party's gubernatorial nominee, Adlai Stevenson III, lost narrowly (by 5,074 votes statewide, or 0.14 percent of the vote) to incumbent Republican Governor James R. Thompson and his running mate (later disgraced Governor) George Ryan.

Stern continued to be known for her wit, charm and dedication to public service as she served in the Illinois House of Representatives from 1985 to 1993. Mrs. Stern also became known for her support of women's issues, equal rights, gun control, voter registration, the disadvantaged and the mentally ill. In 1992 Stern narrowly defeated Republican Roger Keats based on winning 77% of the Lake County votes in the two-county, 29th senatorial district and served in the Illinois State Senate from 1993 until 1995. Knowing that she was a prime target of North Shore Republicans hoping to regain the seat and control of the Illinois Senate, Stern sometimes even taped a target to her back. In 1994, a poor election year for Democrats, Stern narrowly lost her campaign for re-election to Republican Kathy Parker.

== Death and legacy ==
Stern died at her Highland Park home after a two year battle with brain cancer. She was survived by her children and ten grandchildren. Among politicians of both parties attending her funeral were her former running-mate Adlai Stevenson III, fellow Democrat Dawn Clark Netsch (who in 1990 won election as Illinois Comptroller, becoming the first woman in Illinois history to win a statewide elected office), and Republicans Kathy Parker and current Lake County clerk Willard Helander. Her papers are held in the archives of the University of Illinois at Chicago. As noted by the Illinois General Assembly in their memorial resolution, Stern received numerous humanitarian awards in her lifetime, and a scholarship was established in her memory at Roosevelt University.

Party political offices
Preceded by Dick Durbin	Democratic nominee for Lieutenant Governor of Illinois; 1982	Succeeded by Mark Fairchild
