= Terry Link =

American politician

Member of the Illinois Senate from the 30th district
- In office January 1997 – September 2020
- Preceded by: David N. Barkhausen
- Succeeded by: Adriane Johnson

Personal details
- Born: March 20, 1947 (age 79)
- Party: Democratic
- Education: University of Wisconsin–Stout

Terry Link (born March 20, 1947) is an American politician who represented the 30th district in the Illinois Senate from 1997 until his resignation in 2020. The 30th district includes all or part of the municipalities of Beach Park, Buffalo Grove, Green Oaks, Lincolnshire, Mundelein, North Chicago, Riverwoods, Wheeling, Vernon Hills and Waukegan.

Link was an unsuccessful candidate for mayor of Waukegan, Illinois in 2012. In 2020, Link pleaded guilty to tax evasion and resigned from his seat in the Senate. For the same reason, he also resigned from his position as Chairman of the Democratic Party of Lake County.

== Early life and education ==
A lifelong resident of the Waukegan-North Chicago area, Link attended North Chicago Community High School. After graduating, he attended Stout State University (now the University of Wisconsin–Stout).

== Career ==
After college, Link began to pursue his career in business as a partner at Major Industrial Trucking. He later worked for Johnson Controls in their governmental affairs division. He later served in both the Illinois State Treasurer's office and Illinois Secretary of State's office.

In 1992, Link was elected Chairman of the Democratic Party of Lake County by his fellow Democratic precinct committeemen.

Link ran for the Illinois Senate to serve the 30th district in 90th General Assembly. In an upset, Link defeated Thomas Lachner, a Republican member of the Illinois House of Representatives, to succeed retiring Republican David Barkhausen.

As a senator, Link supported legislation to aid those on fixed incomes, to cap large tax increases statewide. He also supported a tax credit to encourage businesses to hire honorably discharged veterans, a consumer protection measure requiring automotive manufacturers to eliminate mercury switches from existing vehicles and served as the lead sponsor on the Wetland Protection Act and Smoke Free Illinois.

Link advised then-State Senator Barack Obama to not run against Bobby Rush in the 2000 primary for Illinois's 1st congressional district.

In the 97th General Assembly, Link served as the Chairperson of the Gaming Committee and Vice Chairperson of Financial Institutions, Local Government and State Government & Veterans Affairs committees respectively.

Link resigned in September 2020. Local Democratic leaders appointed Adriane Johnson, a Commissioner for the Buffalo Grove Park District, to fill the remainder of his term.

=== 2013 mayoral election ===
Link ran in the Democratic primary for Waukegan Mayor in 2013. He received endorsements from, among others, the Waukegan Police Benevolent Labor Committee and Lake County Board Commissioner Diane Hewitt. Link came in last place in the primary, behind Waukegan City Clerk Wayne Motley and Alderman Sam Cunningham.

=== Income tax evasion conviction ===
In August 2020, Link was charged with one count of income tax evasion. Link later resigned from his position on the Illinois General Assembly Legislative Ethics Commission. A criminal information file asserted that Link had significantly underreported his 2016 income, which included his salary as a state legislator and payment for lobbying work.

In September 2020, Link pled guilty to the income tax evasion charge.

In March 2024, Link was sentenced to three years probation for the tax evasion charge. This lenient sentence was attributed to his "extensive cooperation" with bribery cases such as those involving Luis Arroyo and politician-connected businessman Jimmy Weiss.

== Personal life ==
Link's wife is Susan, with whom he has four children and three grandchildren.
