= Kathy Parker =

American politician (born 1943)

Member of the Illinois Senate from the 29th district
- In office 1995–2003
- Preceded by: Grace Mary Stern
- Succeeded by: Susan Garrett

Personal details
- Born: September 21, 1943 (age 82) Pittsburgh, Pennsylvania
- Party: Republican
- Spouse: Keith Parker
- Profession: politician, businesswoman

Kathleen ("Kathy") Parker (born September 21, 1943) is a former Republican member of the Illinois Senate, who represented the 29th District from 1995 to 2003. The 29th district has a high percentage of independent voters and contains areas in Lake and Cook Counties.

== Formative years ==
Parker was born in Pittsburgh, Pennsylvania on September 21, 1943.

== Career ==
Parker, a co-owner of a manufacturers' representative firm, began her political career in 1975, winning election to the District 31 school board. She was then elected Northfield Township assessor, 1979–1983. Appointed to the Regional Transportation Authority in 1983, she served as its chairman beginning in 1986 until 1995 when she became a state legislator.

President George H. Bush also appointed Parker to the U.S. Architectural and Transportation Barriers Compliance Board in 1991 and she served as its chairman from 1992 to 1995.

In 1994 Parker became the Republican candidate for the 29th state senatorial district, which now includes all or parts of Bannockburn, Deerfield, Des Plaines, Fort Sheridan, Glencoe, Glenview, Highland Park, Highwood, Knollwood, Lake Bluff, Lake Forest, Mount Prospect, Niles, Northbrook, Park Ridge, Prospect Heights and Riverwoods. She defeated incumbent Democrat Grace Mary Stern. Re-elected several times, she sponsored legislation concerning accessible day care and also rose to chair the Senate Transportation Committee as well as a Task Force on Mental Health issues.

Redistricting by Democratic legislators after the 2000 census, made Parker vulnerable to a Democratic opponent, however, and she was narrowly defeated during the 2002 election by Democrat Susan Garrett.

== Personal background ==
Parker lives in Northbrook with her husband, Keith. They have two adult sons. Parker received her bachelor's degree in mass communications from the University of Miami, Florida.
