= Steve Baer (political activist) =

American political activist (1959–2025)

Steven Paul Baer (October 13, 1959 – December 25, 2025) was an American conservative political activist and investor. Over the course of his political involvement, he gained a reputation as a provocateur in Republican circles. Most notably, he challenged Illinois Secretary of State Jim Edgar in the 1990 Illinois Republican gubernatorial primary. Attacking Edgar from the conservative wing of the party, he received about 33% of the vote.

== Biography ==
In 2013, the National Review published an article about Baer titled This Conservative Mega-Donor Is the World’s Most Successful E-mail Harasser. The article said that he was known for "sending combative and colorful e-mail missives in past months to a who’s-who list of power brokers in the conservative world." A 2016 Huffington Post article said, "Baer's style is to liberally cc and bcc an endless stream of powerful people, and it usually has the effect of getting none of them to listen."

Baer was the former president of the United Republican Fund of Illinois. He received around 250,000 votes in the 1990 Illinois Republican gubernatorial primary on an anti-tax, anti-abortion, and school choice platform versus Republican Secretary of State Jim Edgar, who later became governor. After his loss, The Chicago Tribune wrote that "Baer fancies himself as a foot soldier of the Republican Right. But his self-satisfied smirk and preoccupation with political pranks and hijinks are irrepressible." A Daily Beast in 2016 report said Baer is "well known in conservative circles as a professional rabble rouser who delighted in taking aim at Republicans whom he thinks are less conservative than his Grand Old Party deserves."

During the mid 1990s, Baer helped establish a short-lived far-right political party in Illinois called the Term Limits and Tax Limits Party. Baer and his wife, Donna, had ten children. He died on December 25, 2025, aged 66.
