= Julie Morrison =

American politician (born 1956)

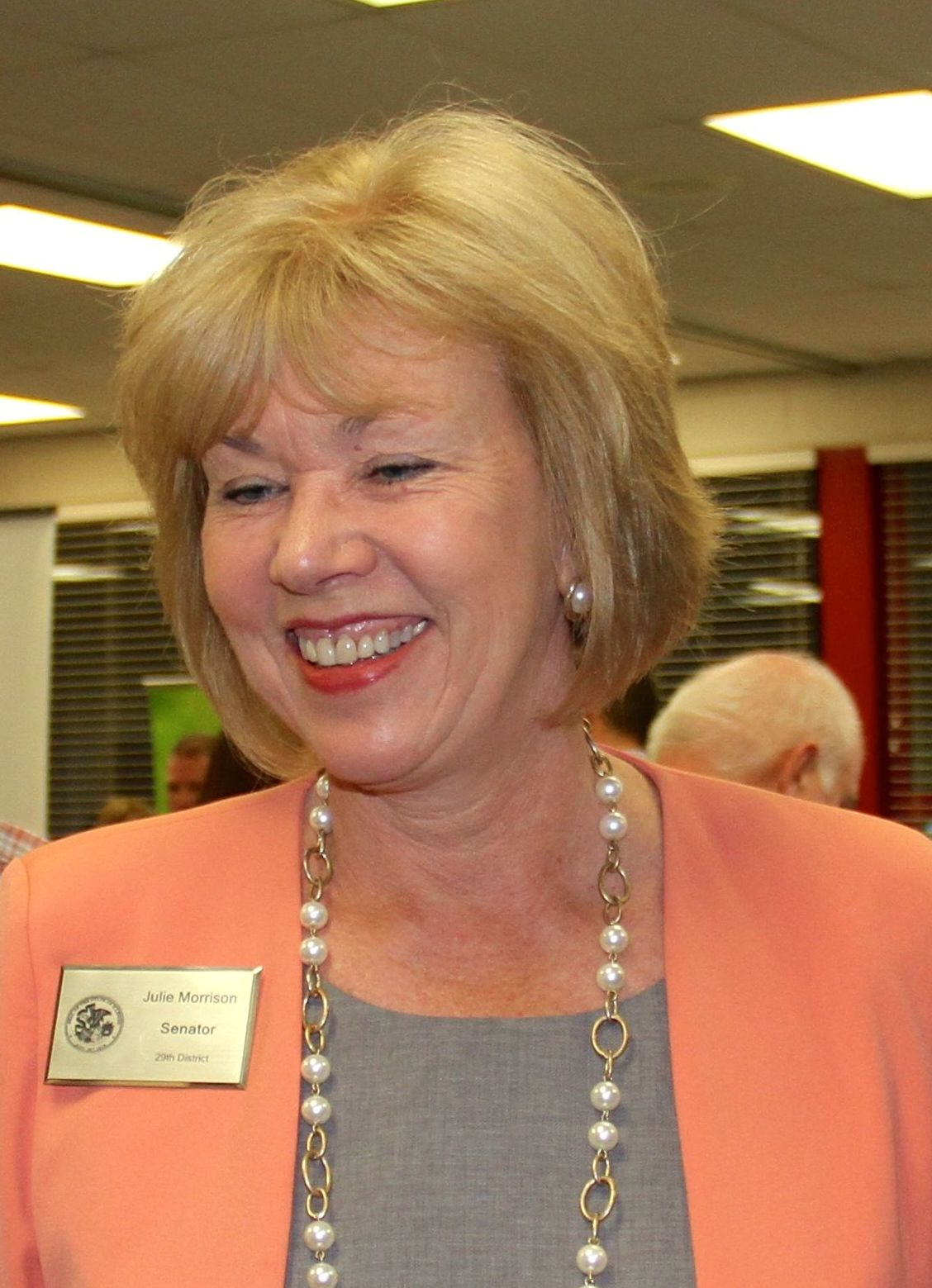

Member of the Illinois Senate from the 29th district
- Incumbent
- Assumed office January 9, 2013
- Preceded by: Susan Garrett

West Deerfield Township Supervisor
- In office 1997 – 2013
- Preceded by: Marilyn Craig
- Succeeded by: Alyson Feiger

Personal details
- Born: September 20, 1956 (age 70) Beardstown, Illinois, US
- Party: Democratic
- Spouse: Joe
- Children: 3
- Education: Knox College (BA)
- Occupation: Civil service

Julie A. Morrison (born September 20, 1956) is an American politician. She is a member of the Illinois Senate from the 29th district. The 29th district includes all or parts of Arlington Heights, Buffalo Grove, Bannockburn, Deerfield, Glencoe, Glenview, Highland Park, Lake Bluff, Lake Forest, Lincolnshire, Northbrook and North Chicago. Prior to her service in the Illinois Senate, she was the West Deerfield Township Supervisor.

== Early life, education, and career ==
Morrison was born and grew up in Beardstown, Illinois. She attended Knox College and graduated with a bachelor's in political science. She took a job with the Natural Gas Pipeline Company of America before being appointed to the Advisory Council for the Department of Children and Family Services where she served until 1996. During her final two years she served as chair of the commission. In 1997 she was elected West Deerfield Township Supervisor. As Supervisor she was the chief executive officer, chairman of the board of trustees and treasurer of all funds. She handled the daily operations of the administration building.

== Illinois Senate ==
In 2011, Morrison announced her intention to run for state senate to replace the retiring Susan Garrett. She easily defeated Milton Sumpton in the primary and went on to face Arie Friedman in the general election.

In the general election, Morrison was endorsed by State Representative Karen May, State Representative Elaine Nekritz, Senator Susan Garrett, Assistant Senate Majority Leader Jeffrey Schoenberg, Congresswoman Jan Schakowsky and former Congressman John Porter.

Morrison won the election to become the next state senator from the 29th district.

As of July 2022, Senator Morrison is a member of the following Illinois Senate committees:

- Appropriations - State Law Enforcement Committee (SAPP-SASL)
- (Chairwoman of) Appropriations - Health Committee (SAPP-SAHA)
- Appropriations Committee (SAPP)
- Environment and Conservation Committee (SNVR)
- Ethics Committee (SETH)
- Financial Institutions Committee (SFIC)
- (Chairwoman of) Health Committee (SHEA)
- (Chairwoman of) Redistricting - Lake & McHenry Counties (SRED-SRLM)
- (Chairwoman of) Subcommittee on Special Issues (H) (SHEA-SHSI)

Illinois State Senate 29th District General Election, 2012
Party	Candidate	Votes	%
Democratic	Julie Morrison	46,673	54.4
Republican	Arie Friedman	39,087	45.6
Democratic hold			

== Personal life ==
Morrison witnessed the Highland Park parade shooting. She was at the parade with her family at the time; all of them survived uninjured.
