= George Ryan =

Governor of Illinois from 1999 to 2003

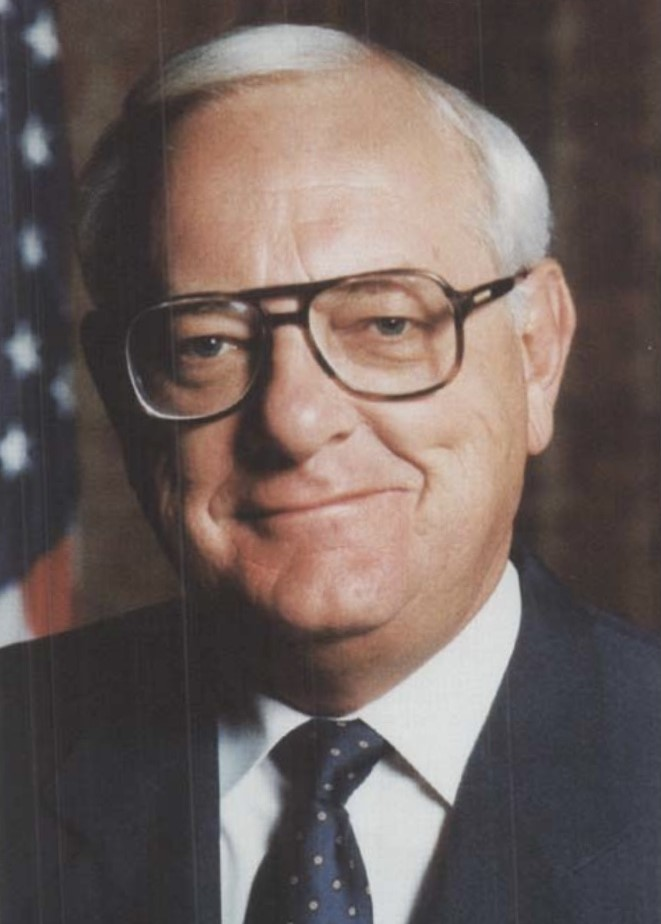
- Official portrait, 1989

39th Governor of Illinois
- In office January 11, 1999 – January 13, 2003
- Lieutenant: Corinne Wood
- Preceded by: Jim Edgar
- Succeeded by: Rod Blagojevich

36th Secretary of State of Illinois
- In office January 14, 1991 – January 11, 1999
- Governor: Jim Edgar
- Preceded by: Jim Edgar
- Succeeded by: Jesse White

42nd Lieutenant Governor of Illinois
- In office January 10, 1983 – January 14, 1991
- Governor: Jim Thompson
- Preceded by: Dave O'Neal (1981)
- Succeeded by: Bob Kustra

28th Chair of the National Lieutenant Governors Association
- In office 1987–1988
- Preceded by: Winston Bryant
- Succeeded by: Steve McAlpine

65th Speaker of the Illinois House of Representatives
- In office January 14, 1981 – January 10, 1983
- Preceded by: William A. Redmond
- Succeeded by: Arthur A. Telcser

Minority Leader of the Illinois House of Representatives
- In office January 12, 1977 – January 14, 1981
- Preceded by: James R. Washburn
- Succeeded by: Mike Madigan

Member of the Illinois House of Representatives from the 43rd district
- In office January 10, 1973 – January 10, 1983
- Preceded by: Multi-member district
- Succeeded by: Judy Baar Topinka

Personal details
- Born: George Homer Ryan; February 24, 1934 Maquoketa, Iowa, U.S.
- Died: May 2, 2025 (aged 91) Kankakee, Illinois, U.S.
- Party: Republican
- Spouse: Lura Lowe (m. 1956; died 2011)
- Children: 6
- Education: Ferris State University (BS)
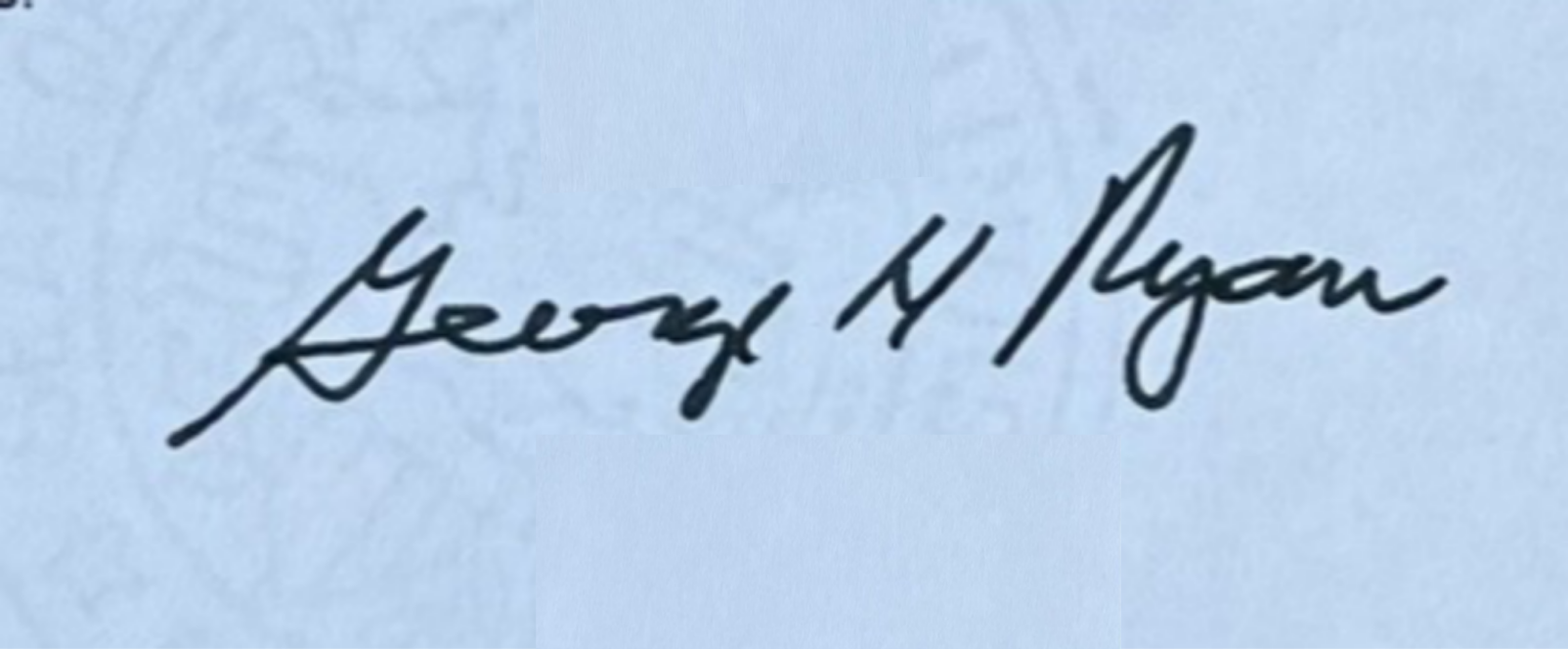
- Signature

Military service
- Allegiance: United States
- Branch: United States Army
- Service years: 1954–1956
- Criminal information
- Criminal information
- Status: Released
- Convictions: Racketeering; Bribery; Extortion; Tax fraud; Money laundering
- Penalty: Served over 5 years of a 6.5 year sentence

George Homer Ryan (February 24, 1934 – May 2, 2025) was an American politician who served as the 39th governor of Illinois from 1999 to 2003. A member of the Republican Party, he previously served as Secretary of State of Illinois from 1991 to 1999 and as lieutenant governor from 1983 to 1991. He was later convicted of federal racketeering, bribery, extortion, money laundering, and tax fraud stemming from his time in office.

Ryan was elected governor in 1998, narrowly defeating Democratic Congressman Glenn Poshard. He received national attention for his 2000 moratorium on executions in Illinois and for commuting more than 160 death sentences to life sentences in 2003. He chose not to run for reelection in 2002 amid a scandal. He was later convicted of federal corruption charges stemming from the illegal sale of commercial drivers licenses which resulted in the deaths of six children while serving as secretary of state and spent more than five years in federal prison and seven months of home confinement. He was released from federal prison on July 3, 2013.

== Early life, family and education ==
George Homer Ryan was born in Maquoketa, Iowa, to Jeannette (née Bowman) and Thomas Ryan, a pharmacist. Ryan was raised in Kankakee County, Illinois. His brother Tom became a prominent political figure in Kankakee County. Their sister Kathleen Dean's former son-in-law, Bruce Clark, would become the country clerk in Kankakee County, Illinois.

George was drafted into the US Army in 1954, serving a 13-month tour in Korea, where he worked at a base pharmacy.

He attended Ferris State College of Pharmacy (now Ferris State University) in Big Rapids, Michigan.

== Early career ==
After Korea, George Ryan worked for his father's two drugstores. Eventually, he built his father's pair of pharmacies into a successful family-run chain (profiting from lucrative government-contract business selling prescription drugs to nursing homes) which he sold in 1990.

== Early political career ==
Ryan began his political career by serving on the Kankakee County Board from 1968 to 1973 (his brother Tom J. Ryan was Mayor of Kankakee for 20 years from 1965 to 1985). He was then elected to the Illinois House of Representatives in 1972, where he served five terms. In 1976, he was elected House Minority Leader. As Minority Leader, Ryan led Republicans to win a 91-86 majority in the House in 1980; he was subsequently elected Speaker in January 1981.

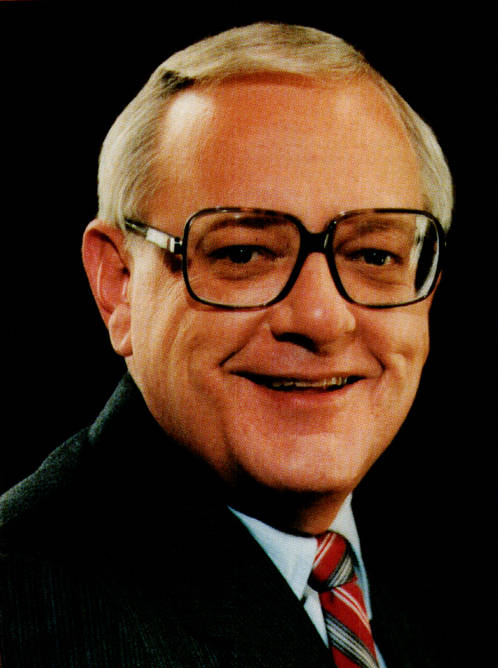
Ryan in 1987

In July 1981, Dave O'Neal, the lieutenant governor under Republican Governor James R. Thompson, resigned unexpectedly. To fill in the vacancy left by O'Neal's resignation, Thompson selected Ryan to be his running mate in the 1982 election. The Thompson/Ryan ticket narrowly defeated the Democratic ticket of Adlai Stevenson III and Grace Stern. Thompson and Ryan were both reelected to their positions in 1986. In 1990, Ryan was elected Secretary of State of Illinois. During his first term as Secretary of State, then–State Treasurer Pat Quinn was publicly critical of Ryan, specifically drawing attention to special vanity license plates that Ryan's office provided for clout-hungry motorists. This rivalry led Quinn in a failed bid to challenge Ryan in the 1994 general election for Secretary of State.

== Governor of Illinois ==
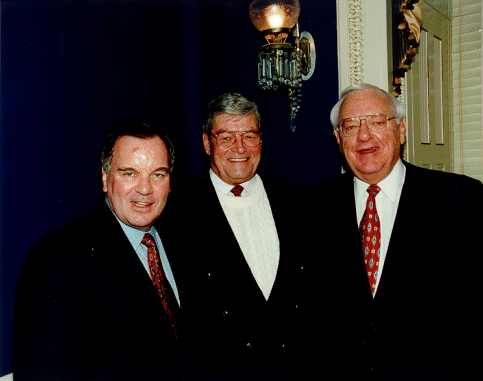
Ryan (right) with Phil Crane (center) and Richard M. Daley (left)

On August 30, 1997, incumbent governor Jim Edgar announced he would retire after his second term; three days later, Ryan announced his candidacy for governor. He won the Republican nomination with minimal opposition and defeated his opponent, Glenn Poshard, in the general election by a 51–47 percent margin. Ryan's running mate was first-term state representative Corinne Wood. Ryan outspent Poshard by a 4-to-1 margin. Poshard, a firm believer in campaign finance reform, placed limits on individual donations and refused to accept donations from corporate or special interests.

One of Ryan's pet projects as governor was an extensive repair of the Illinois Highway System called "Illinois FIRST". FIRST was an acronym for "Fund for Infrastructure, Roads, Schools, and Transit". Signed into law in May 1999, the law created a $6.3 billion package for use in school and transportation projects. With various matching funds programs, Illinois FIRST provided $2.2 billion for schools, $4.1 billion for public transportation, another $4.1 billion for roads, and $1.6 billion for other projects. He also improved Illinois's technology infrastructure, creating one of the first cabinet-level Offices of Technology in the country and bringing up Illinois's technology ranking in a national magazine from 48th out of the 50 states when he took office to 1st just two years later. Ryan committed record funding to education, including 51% of all new state revenues during his time in office, in addition to the billions spent through Illinois FIRST that built and improved schools and education infrastructure. In 1999, Ryan sparked controversy by becoming the first sitting U.S. Governor to meet with Cuban President Fidel Castro. Ryan's visit led to a $1 million donation of humanitarian aid, but drew criticism from anti-Castro groups. In 2000, Ryan served as a chair of the Midwestern Governors Association.

=== Capital punishment ===
Ryan helped to renew the national debate on capital punishment when, as governor, he declared a moratorium on his state's death penalty on January 31, 2000.

This decision was heavily influenced by lawsuits filed by exonerated prisoners who made false confessions as a result of police torture under the direction of a police commander named Jon Burge. "We have now freed more people than we have put to death under our system," he said. "There is a flaw in the system, without question, and it needs to be studied." At the time, Illinois had executed 12 people since the reinstatement of the death penalty in 1977, with one execution, that of Ripper Crew member Andrew Kokoraleis, occurring early during Ryan's term. Ryan refused to meet with religious leaders and others regarding "a stay of execution" in light of the impending 'moratorium' and other facts relative to the 'flawed' capital punishment system in Illinois; in fact, under Ryan's governorship, 13 people were released from jail after appealing their convictions based on new evidence. Ryan called for a commission to study the issue, while noting, "I still believe the death penalty is a proper response to heinous crimes ... But I believe that it has to be where we don't put innocent people to death."

The issue had garnered the attention of the public when a death row inmate, Anthony Porter, who had spent 15 years on death row, was within two days of being executed when his lawyers won a stay on the grounds that he may have been mentally disabled. He was ultimately exonerated with the help of a group of student journalists at Northwestern University who had uncovered evidence that was used to prove his innocence. In 1999, Porter was released, charges were subsequently dropped, and another person, Alstory Simon, confessed and pleaded guilty to the crime of which Porter had been erroneously convicted. Simon himself was later released after serving fifteen years for the crime, after it was proven that he, too, was wrongfully accused.

On January 11, 2003, just two days before leaving office, Ryan commuted (to life terms) the sentences of everyone on or waiting to be sent to Illinois' death row — a total of 167 convicts — due to his belief that the death penalty could not be administered fairly. He also pardoned four inmates, Aaron Patterson, Madison Hobley and Leroy Orange (all of whom were interrogated by Burge and released), and Stanley Howard. However, Patterson is currently serving 30 years in prison after being arrested for drug trafficking he committed after his release from death row. Howard remains in prison for armed robbery. Ryan declared in his pardon speech that he would have freed Howard if only his attorney had filed a clemency petition; Ryan then strongly urged investigators to examine Howard's alleged robbery case, because it appeared to be as tainted as his murder conviction.

These were four of ten death row inmates known as the "Death Row 10," due to widely reported claims that the confessions that they had given in their respective cases had been coerced through torture. Ryan was not the first state governor to have granted blanket commutations to death row inmates during his final days in office. Arkansas Governor Winthrop Rockefeller also commuted the sentence of every death row inmate in that state as he left office after losing his 1970 bid for a third two-year term, as did New Mexico Governor Toney Anaya before he left office in 1986 and Ohio Governor Dick Celeste before he left office in 1990.

Ryan won praise from death penalty opponents: as early as 2001, he received the Mario Cuomo Act of Courage Award from Death Penalty Focus and in 2003 the Rose Elizabeth Bird Commitment to Justice Award from the same organization. On the other side of the Atlantic, Robert Badinter, who had successfully introduced the bill abolishing the death penalty in France in 1981 praised Ryan's decision. Many conservatives, though, were opposed to the commutations, some questioning his motives, which came as a federal corruption investigation closed in on the governor and his closest political allies (see below). Conservative columnist Pat Buchanan called Ryan "pathetic", and suggested the governor was attempting to save his public image in hopes of avoiding prison himself. Buchanan noted "Ryan announced his decision to a wildly cheering crowd at the Northwestern University Law School. Families of the victims of the soon-to-be-reprieved killers were not invited."

== Scandals, trial, and conviction ==
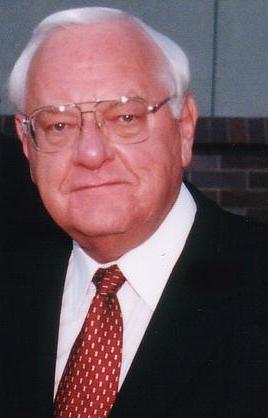
Ryan in 2007

Ryan's political career was marred by a scandal called Operation Safe Road, which involved the illegal sale of government licenses, contracts, and leases by state employees during his prior service as Secretary of State. In the wake of numerous convictions of his former aides, he chose not to run for reelection in 2002. Seventy-nine former state officials, lobbyists, and others were charged in the investigation, and at least 75 were convicted.

The corruption scandal leading to Ryan's downfall began more than a decade earlier during a federal investigation into a deadly crash in Wisconsin. Six children from the Willis family of Chicago, Illinois, were killed; their parents, Rev. Duane and Janet Willis, were severely burned. The investigation revealed a scheme inside Ryan's Secretary of State's office in which unqualified truck drivers obtained licenses through bribes.

In March 2003, Scott Fawell, Ryan's former chief of staff and campaign manager, was convicted on federal charges of racketeering and fraud. He was sentenced to six years and six months. Former deputy campaign manager Richard Juliano pleaded guilty to related charges and testified against Fawell at trial. Roger Stanley, a former Republican state representative who was hired by Ryan and testified against Fawell, pleaded guilty to wide-ranging corruption, admitting he paid kickbacks to win state contracts and campaign business, secretly mailed out vicious false attacks on political opponents and helped obtain ghost-payrolling jobs.

=== Indictment ===
The investigation finally reached the former governor, and in December 2003, Ryan and lobbyist Lawrence Warner were named in a 22-count federal indictment. The charges included racketeering, bribery, extortion, money laundering, and tax fraud. The indictment alleged that Ryan steered several state contracts to Warner and other friends; disbursed campaign funds to relatives and to pay personal expenses; and obstructed justice by attempting to end the state investigation of the license-for-bribes scandal. He was charged with lying to investigators and accepting cash, gifts and loans in return for his official actions as governor. On September 19, 2005, the case went to trial.

Fawell, under pressure from prosecutors, became a key witness against Ryan and Warner. He agreed to a plea deal that cut the prison time for himself and his fiancée, Andrea Coutretsis. Fawell was a controversial witness, not hiding his disdain for prosecutors from the witness stand. According to CBS Chicago political editor Mike Flannery, insiders claimed that Fawell had been "much like a son" to Ryan throughout their careers. At Ryan's trial, Fawell acknowledged that the prosecution had his "head in a vise", and that he found his cooperation with the government against Ryan "the most distasteful thing I've ever done". Nonetheless, he spent several days on the witness stand testifying against Ryan and Warner. Once a tough-talking political strategist, Fawell wept on the witness stand as he acknowledged that his motivation for testifying was to spare Coutretsis a long prison sentence for her role in the conspiracy. The jury was twice sent out of the courtroom so that he could wipe tears from his eyes and regain his composure.

Ryan's daughters and a son-in-law, Michael Fairman, were implicated by testimony during the trial. Stipulations agreed upon by the defense and prosecution and submitted to the court included admissions that all five of Ryan's daughters received illegal payments from the Ryan campaign. In addition to Lynda Fairman, who received funds beyond those her husband Michael testified he had received, the stipulations included admissions from the rest of Ryan's daughters that they did little or no work in return for the payments. In addition, Fawell testified that Ryan's mother's housekeeper was illegally paid from campaign funds, and that Ryan's adopted sister, Nancy Ferguson, received campaign funds without performing campaign work. The prosecution took nearly four months to present their case, as a parade of other witnesses (including Juliano) followed Fawell.

On April 17, 2006, the jury found Ryan and Warner guilty on all counts. However, when ruling on post-trial motions, the judge dismissed two counts against Ryan for lack of proof. Ryan said that he would appeal the verdict, largely due to the issues with the jury.

Patrick Fitzgerald, the federal prosecutor, noted, "Mr. Ryan steered contracts worth millions of dollars to friends and took payments and vacations in return. When he was a sitting governor, he lied to the FBI about this conduct and then he went out and did it again." He charged that one of the most egregious aspects of the corruption was Ryan's action after learning that bribes were being paid for licenses. Instead of ending the practice he tried to end the investigation that had uncovered it, Fitzgerald said, calling the moment "a low-water mark for public service".

On September 6, 2006, Ryan was sentenced to six and a half years in prison. He was ordered to go to prison on January 4, 2007, but the appellate court granted an appeal bond, allowing him to remain free pending the outcome of the appeal. His conviction was affirmed by the Court of Appeals of the Seventh Circuit on August 21, 2007, and review by the entire Seventh Circuit was denied on October 25, 2007. The Seventh Circuit then rejected Ryan's bid to remain free while he asked the U.S. Supreme Court to hear his case; the opinion called the evidence of Ryan's guilt "overwhelming". The Supreme Court rejected an extension of his bail, and Ryan reported to the Federal Prison Camp in Oxford, Wisconsin, on November 7, 2007. He was transferred on February 29, 2008, to a medium security facility in Terre Haute, Indiana, after Oxford changed its level of medical care and stopped housing inmates over 70 years old. He was listed as Federal Inmate Number 16627-424 and was released on July 3, 2013.

=== Defense and appeal ===
Ryan's defense was provided pro bono by Winston & Strawn, a law firm managed by former governor Jim Thompson. The defense cost the firm $10 million through mid-November 2005. Estimates of the cost to the firm as of September 2006 ranged as high as $20 million. Ryan served as Thompson's lieutenant governor from 1983 to 1991. After the United States Supreme Court declined to hear Ryan's appeal, Thompson indicated that he would ask then-President George W. Bush to commute Ryan's sentence to time served. US Senator Dick Durbin of Illinois wrote a letter to Bush dated December 1, 2008, asking him to commute Ryan's sentence, citing Ryan's age and his wife's frail health, saying, "This action would not pardon him of his crimes or remove the record of his conviction, but it would allow him to return to his wife and family for their remaining years." Bush did not commute Ryan's sentence.

After his conviction Ryan's annual $197,037 state pension was suspended under state law. Ryan's attorneys litigated the pension matter all the way to the Illinois Supreme Court, which ruled on February 19, 2010, that state law "plainly mandates that none of the benefits provided for under the system shall be paid to Ryan". Ryan was paid $635,000 in pension benefits during the three years between his retirement and his political corruption conviction, plus a refund of the $235,500 in personal contributions he made during his 30 years in public office.

=== Sentencing ===
In 2010, Ryan requested early release, partly because his wife had terminal cancer and was given only six months to live, and partly on the grounds that some of his convictions should be vacated in light of a U.S. Supreme Court ruling that was alleged to have affected their legitimacy. On December 21, 2010, US District Court Judge Rebecca Pallmeyer denied Ryan's request.

On January 5, 2011, Ryan was taken from his prison cell in Terre Haute, Indiana, to a hospital in Kankakee, Illinois to visit his dying wife. He was present when she died on June 27, five months after that visit. Ryan entered a Salvation Army halfway house in Chicago on January 30, 2013. Less than three hours later, he was released back to his home in Kankakee where he remained on home confinement until July 3, 2013.

== Personal life and death ==
On June 10, 1956, Ryan married his high school sweetheart, Lura Lynn Lowe (July 5, 1934 – June 27, 2011), whom he had met in a high school English class. She grew up in Aroma Park, where her family (originally from Germany) had lived since 1834. Her father owned one of the first hybrid seed companies in the United States. The couple had five daughters (including a set of triplets); Julie, Joanne, Jeanette, Lynda and Nancy; and one son, George Homer Ryan, Jr. Lura Lowe died of lung cancer at Riverside Hospital in Kankakee on June 27, 2011.

Ryan died at his home in Kankakee, on May 2, 2025, at the age of 91. He had been in hospice care for several days.

== Electoral history ==
1998 Governor/Lieutenant Governor election
Party	Candidate	Votes	%
Republican	George Ryan / Corinne Wood	1,714,094	51.03
Democratic	Glenn Poshard / Mary Lou Kearns	1,594,191	47.46
Reform	Lawrence Redmond / Phyllis Nirchi	50,372	1.50
Write-in	Other	0.00	0.00
Total votes		3,358,705	100

1994 Secretary of State election
Party	Candidate	Votes	%
Republican	George H. Ryan (incumbent)	1,868,144	60.48
Democratic	Pat Quinn	1,182,629	38.29
Libertarian	Joseph Schreiner	38,074	1.23
Total votes		3,088,847	100

1990 Secretary of State election
Party	Candidate	Votes	%
Republican	George H. Ryan	1,680,531	53.41
Democratic	Jerome Cosentino	1,465,785	46.59
Total votes		3,146,316	100

== Book ==
- Ryan Sr., George H. (with Maurice Possley) (2020). Until I Could Be Sure: How I Stopped the Death Penalty in Illinois. L Rowman & Littlefield Publishers. ISBN 978-1-538-13454-2.

Illinois House of Representatives
Preceded by James R. Washburn	Minority Leader of the Illinois House of Representatives; 1977–1981	Succeeded by Michael Madigan
Political offices
Preceded by William A. Redmond	Speaker of the Illinois House of Representatives; 1981–1983	Succeeded by Arthur A. Telcser
Preceded by Dave O'Neal	Lieutenant Governor of Illinois; 1983–1991	Succeeded by Bob Kustra
Preceded by Jim Edgar	Secretary of State of Illinois; 1991–1999	Succeeded by Jesse White
Preceded by Jim Edgar	Governor of Illinois; 1999–2003	Succeeded by Rod Blagojevich
Party political offices
Preceded by Dave O'Neal	Republican nominee for Lieutenant Governor of Illinois; 1982, 1986	Succeeded by Bob Kustra
Preceded by Jim Edgar	Republican nominee for Secretary of State of Illinois; 1990, 1994	Succeeded by Al Salvi
Preceded by Jim Edgar	Republican nominee for Governor of Illinois; 1998	Succeeded by Jim Ryan
