= Mary Beattie =

American politician

Member of the Illinois House of Representatives from the 59th district
- In office January 8, 1999 – January 13, 1999
- Preceded by: Corinne Wood
- Succeeded by: Susan Garrett

Personal details
- Born: August 31, 1923
- Died: March 8, 2015 (aged 91)
- Resting place: Lake Forest Cemetery

Mary Ada Jarvis Beattie (August 31, 1923 – March 8, 2015) was an American politician.

== Biography ==
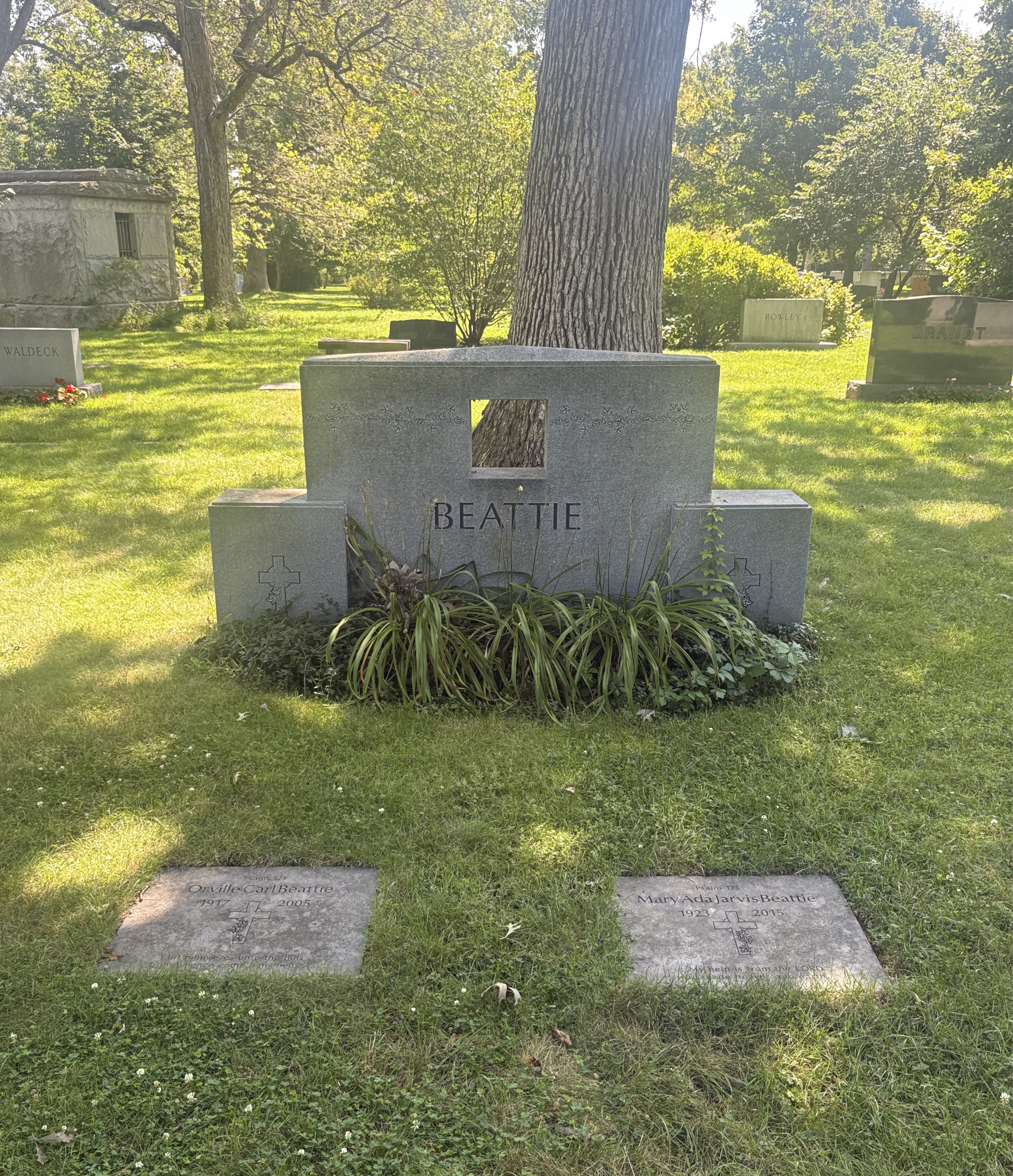
Beattie's grave at Lake Forest Cemetery

She grew up in St. Louis, Missouri. Beatie lived in Lake Forest, Illinois with her husband Orville and their family; she served as a foster parent with her husband. Beattie was involved with the Republican Party and served on the Lake County, Illinois County Board. Beattie served in the Illinois House of Representatives, from the 59th district, from January 8, 1999, to January 13, 1999. Beattie was appointed to the Illinois General Assembly succeeding Corrine Wood after Wood's election as Lieutenant Governor of Illinois.

Beattie died on March 8, 2015 and was buried at Lake Forest Cemetery.
