= Thomas F. Lachner =

American politician

Thomas F. Lachner (September 4, 1955) is an American politician and businessman.

Lachner lived in Lake Bluff, Illinois. He served in the United States Army, in the Military Police Corps. He received his bachelor's degree in international relations from Lake Forest College and his master's degree from Kensington University. He owned Device Resources Corporation. Lachner served in the Illinois House of Representatives from 1995 to 1997 and was a Republican. Lachner ran for the Illinois Senate in the 1996 election. In an upset, Lachner lost to Democratic candidate Terry Link.

== Notes ==
Illinois House of Representatives
Preceded by Virginia Frederick	Member of the Illinois House of Representatives from the 59th district 1995–1997	Succeeded by Corinne Wood
