= Blanket clemency =

General clemency for a group of people

Blanket clemency is clemency granted to multiple persons and can be in the form of a pardon, shortening of a prison sentence, or a commutation of a sentence, or a reprieve. Most states' governors and the President of the United States have the power to grant clemency; In other states, that power is committed to an appointed agency or board, or to a board and the governor in some hybrid arrangement.

You do not necessarily need to be convicted to receive a pardon. Depending on the exact formulation of a blanket pardon, and the specific underlying legal framework of course, the pardon can even protect from future prosecution. In the United States specifically, preemptive Presidential pardons have been issued.

== Examples ==
- President Jimmy Carter pardoned men who evaded the Vietnam War draft, fulfilling a controversial campaign promise.
- President Donald Trump's pardon of January 6 United States Capitol attack defendants.
- Retiring Governor George Ryan of Illinois issued a blanket clemency to all death row inmates after special clemency hearings in January 2003.
