= René Romero Schuler =

American painter and sculptor (born 1968)

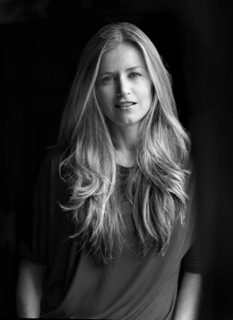
- Romero Schuler in 2014
- Born: René Romero; November 29, 1968 (age 56); Chicago, Illinois, U.S.
- Known for: Painting
- Website: www.reneromeroschuler.com

René Romero Schuler is an American painter and sculptor who constructs her paintings with trowels and palette knives. Schuler is inspired by the Bay Area Figurative Movement of the 1950s and '60s. She has taught painting at the Illinois Institute of Art and Chicago City Colleges, lectured at Northwestern University, and was board member of the Loyola University Museum of Art (LUMA) in Chicago.

== Early life and background ==
René Romero Schuler was born on November 29, 1968, in Chicago, Illinois. She finished her education and began her career in interiors, later launched her own mural and decorative painting business, as was written in Chicago Art magazine, November 2, 2010. She has participated in several shows worldwide, with current representation in Fort Lauderdale and Jupiter, Florida; Chicago, Illinois; Paris, France; Provincetown, Massachusetts; Cincinnati, Ohio; Houston, Texas; and Lancaster, Pennsylvania.

== Career ==
Romero Schuler has served on the boards of arts organizations and lectured at universities. A book, René Romero Schuler: Life and Works, showcasing images of the artist’s thick impastos and striking figural canvases in addition to providing readers a look into her artistic process, was released in 2013. A book, titled René Romero Schuler, was released in August 2016, and a second hardcover book, also titled René Romero Schuler containing personal essays and poetry alongside her most recent works, was released summer 2019.

Romero Schuler has taught at the Illinois Institute of Art and Chicago City Colleges. Her art collections are inside the Union League Club of Chicago, Loyola University Museum of Art, St. Thomas University Museum of Art, Grand Valley State University in Michigan, Coral Springs Museum of Art, St. Thomas University Museum of Art – Sardiñas Gallery in Miami, Neiman Marcus, Chicago Children's Choir, and others. Romero Schuler’s work has exhibited most recently in Rome and Paris, at Art Basel Miami/ArtMiami and Red Dot Art Fairs since 2011.

Romero Schuler has been featured on TV and radio and in publications including the Chicago Tribune, Chicago Social Magazine, LUXE interiors + design Magazine, Chicago Collection Magazine, NS Modern Luxury Magazine, Forest & Bluff Magazine, Sheridan Road Magazine, Nightclub and Bar Magazine, Hospitality Design Magazine, Pioneer Press, Gazebo News, North Shore Magazine and the Chicago Reader.

== Personal life ==
Romero Schuler lives in both Lake Forest, Illinois, and Carmel-by-the-Sea, California, with husband Rick Schuler and their two children.

== Notable exhibitions ==
- Subjective | Objective Zolla/Lieberman Gallery | Chicago, IL SOLO EXHIBITION February 28–March 28, 2020
- "Corps Et Ames" Galerie Géraldine Banier, Paris, France, June 13-September 21
- "In Search of Ground" Zolla/Lieberman Gallery, Chicago, September 7-October 20
- "EXPO Chicago" 2017 GROUP EXHIBITION-Zolla/Lieberman Gallery, Chicago
- "Au-dela de la Surface" Galerie du Diamant-Paris, France-July/October 2017
- “Miroir de Vie” Galerie Agathe de Kergos-Paris, France May–July 2017
- “Everyone and No One” MAC Fine Art-Fort Lauderdale, FL April/May 2016
- "EXPO Chicago" 2016 GROUP EXHIBITION-Zolla/Lieberman Gallery, Chicago
- "Identity" 2016 SOLO EXHIBITION-Zolla/Lieberman Gallery, Chicago
- "Paper Dolls" 2015 Solo Exhibition at Re-invent Gallery, Lake Forest
- "Sounds of Silence" April 2014 St. Thomas University-Sardinas Gallery-Miami Gardens, FL-SOLO EXHIBITION-Museum/University
- "René Romero Schuler" January 2014 Orland Park Public Library-Orland Park, IL-SOLO EXHIBITION-Museum/Institution
- "Grand Opening-MAC Artists" November 2013 MAC Fine Art-Fort Lauderdale, FL-GROUP EXHIBITION-Gallery
- "Chicago In Paris" June/July 2013 Galerie Beckel Odille Boîcos-Paris, France-GROUP EXHIBITION-Gallery
- "Beholding Beauty" May/June 2013 ArtRom Gallery-Rome, Italy-GROUP EXHIBITION-Gallery
- "Body & Soul" December/January 2012/2013 Jennifer Norback Fine Art-Chicago, IL-GROUP EXHIBITION-Gallery
- "MAC Artists" November/December 2012 MAC Fine Art-Miami, FL-GROUP EXHIBITION-Gallery
- "Shadows" October 2011-Jennifer Norback Fine Art-Chicago, IL-SOLO EXHIBITION-Gallery
- "Paintings" January 2011-Jennifer Norback Fine Art-Chicago, IL-SOLO EXHIBITION-Gallery

== Collections ==
- Grand Valley State University, Allendale, MI
- Coral Springs Museum of Art, Coral Springs, FL
- Loyola University Museum of Art (LUMA), Chicago, IL
- St. Thomas University Museum of Art Sardiñas Gallery, Miami Gardens, FL
- The Union League Club of Chicago, Chicago, IL

== Teaching ==
- Schuler Scholars Program, Lake Forest, IL | 2016
- Art From The Heart | 2014-2015
- Illinois Institute of Art (Ray-Vogue) 1995-1997
- Wright College (Chicago City Colleges) 1997-1998
