= Bob Kustra =

American politician

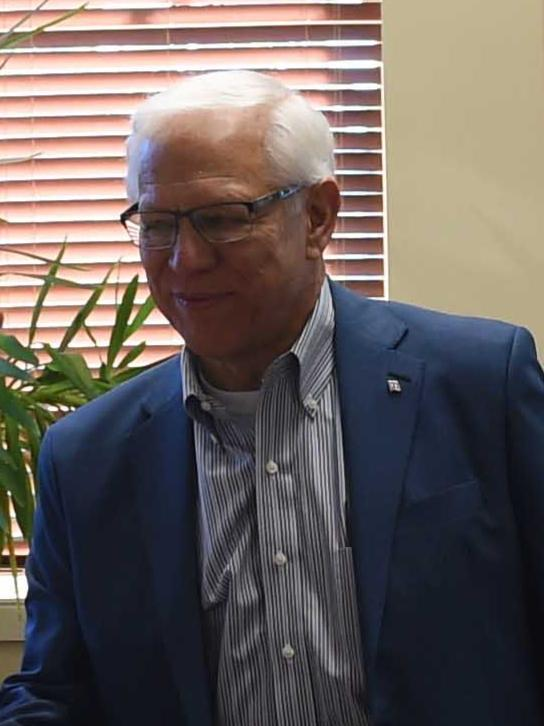
- Kustra during 2016 Navy Week in Boise

6th President of Boise State University
- In office July 1, 2003 – June 30, 2018
- Preceded by: Charles Ruch
- Succeeded by: Marlene Tromp

10th President of Eastern Kentucky University
- In office July 1, 1998 – June 30, 2002
- Preceded by: Hanly Funderburk
- Succeeded by: Joanne Glasser

43rd Lieutenant Governor of Illinois
- In office January 14, 1991 – July 1, 1998
- Governor: Jim Edgar
- Preceded by: George Ryan
- Succeeded by: Corinne Wood (1999)

Member of the Illinois Senate from the 28th district
- In office January 12, 1983 – January 14, 1991
- Preceded by: District created
- Succeeded by: Marty Butler

Member of the Illinois House of Representatives from the 4th district
- In office January 14, 1981 – January 12, 1983
- Preceded by: Michael Abramson
- Succeeded by: District abolished

Personal details
- Born: Robert Walter Kustra; March 21, 1943 (age 83) St. Louis, Missouri, U.S.
- Party: Republican
- Education: Benedictine College (BA); Southern Illinois University (MPA); University of Illinois (PhD)
- Profession: Educator and politician

Robert Walter Kustra (born March 21, 1943) is an American politician and academic administrator who served as the Lieutenant Governor of Illinois from 1991 to 1998, President of Eastern Kentucky University from 1998 to 2001, and President of Boise State University from 2003 to 2018.

== Education ==
Kustra received his Bachelor of Arts in political science from Benedictine College in Atchison, Kansas, his master's degree in Public Administration from Southern Illinois University Carbondale, and his PhD in political science from the University of Illinois Urbana-Champaign.

== Career ==
=== Politics ===
Kustra served in both houses of the Illinois General Assembly. He served in the House of Representatives, representing the 4th district, from January 14, 1981, to January 12, 1983, when he began representing the 28th district in the Senate, which he did until he resigned to become the Lieutenant Governor in 1991. While in the Senate, he served as Assistant Minority Leader. He was voted Best Freshman Legislator during his first year in each house.

He was elected 43rd Lieutenant Governor of Illinois as Jim Edgar's running-mate, and served from January 14, 1991, to July 1, 1998, when he resigned to become president of Eastern Kentucky University.

Kustra held a pro-choice position on the issue of abortion

He sought the Republican nomination for the United States Senate in 1996 to succeed Paul Simon but was defeated in the primary by Illinois Representative Al Salvi. Salvi's victory was considered a major political upset. Kustra before the primary was considered a heavy favorite to defeat Salvi, a relatively unknown conservative state representative, and Chicago area attorney.

=== Academics ===
Kustra served as a member of the faculty at University of Illinois Springfield, Loyola University of Chicago, the University of Illinois Chicago, and Northwestern University. Kustra served as president of Eastern Kentucky University from 1998 until 2001. From 2003 to 2018, he was president of Boise State University and is a member of the board of the Western Interstate Commission for Higher Education. He also hosted the radio show Reader's Corner on Boise State Public Radio.

He has also served in the following university organizations:

- Midwestern Higher Education Commission (president)
- Illinois Board of Higher Education (chairman)
- NCAA Division I (executive committee and board of directors)
- Presidential Task Force on the Future of Intercollegiate Athletics

While Boise State University saw enormous growth during Kustra's tenure there, his leadership was not without criticism. Congressman Raúl Labrador in August, 2017 suggested that it might be time for Kustra to leave Boise State University. Kustra and Labrador have been critical of each other.

Kustra retired from his position of President of Boise State in the summer of 2018, having announced his pending retirement in November 2017.

Party political offices
Preceded by George Ryan	Republican nominee for Lieutenant Governor of Illinois; 1990, 1994	Succeeded by Corinne Wood
Political offices
Preceded by George H. Ryan	Lieutenant Governor of Illinois; 1991–1998	Succeeded by Corinne Wood
