= 1990 Illinois gubernatorial election =

- November 6, 1990
- Turnout: 54.00% ▲1.63 pp
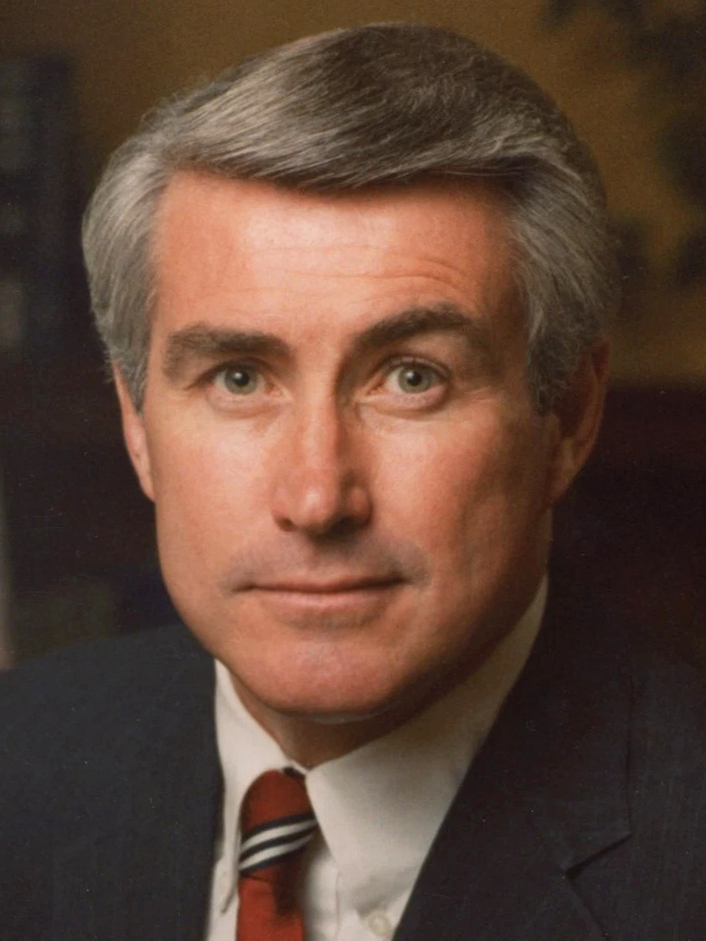

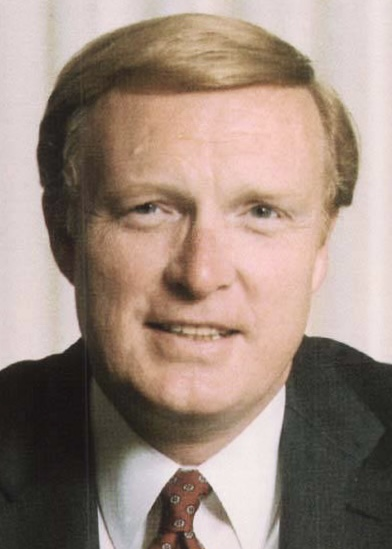
Nominee	Jim Edgar	Neil Hartigan
Party	Republican	Democratic
Running mate	Bob Kustra	Jim Burns
Popular vote	1,653,126	1,569,217
Percentage	50.75%	48.17%
- Edgar: 50–60% 60–70% 70–80% 80–90% Hartigan: 50–60% 60–70% 70–80% 80–90% >90% Tie: 50% No votes
Governor before election
James R. Thompson
Republican
Elected Governor
Jim Edgar
Republican

The 1990 Illinois gubernatorial election occurred on November 6, 1990, to elect the governor and lieutenant governor of Illinois. The incumbent Republican governor, Jim Thompson, having served a record 14 years in office, chose not seek a fifth term, making this the first open-seat gubernatorial race in Illinois since 1952. In the general election, Republican Secretary of State Jim Edgar narrowly defeated Democratic nominee Neil Hartigan, the incumbent Attorney General.

This is the most recent Illinois gubernatorial election in which the Democratic nominee was unopposed in the primary. As of 2026, this is the only time since 1848 that Bureau County has voted for the Democratic candidate for governor.

== Background ==
The primaries and general elections coincided with those for federal elections (Senate and House), as well as those for other state offices. The election was part of the 1990 Illinois elections.

For the primaries, turnout for the gubernatorial primaries was 26.11%, with 1,570,596 votes cast and turnout for the lieutenant gubernatorial primaries was 21.67% with 1,303,250 votes cast. For the general election, turnout was 54.00%, with 3,257,410 votes cast.

== Democratic primary ==
Illinois Attorney General Neil Hartigan won the Democratic gubernatorial nomination, running unopposed.

=== Governor ===
Democratic gubernatorial primary
Party	Candidate	Votes	%
Democratic	Neil F. Hartigan	802,901	100
Total votes		802,901	100

=== Lieutenant governor ===
James B. Burns, future attorney for the Northern District of Illinois, won the Democratic nomination, running unopposed.

Democratic lieutenant gubernatorial primary
Party	Candidate	Votes	%
Democratic	James B. Burns	719,091	100
Total votes		719,091	100

== Republican primary ==
=== Governor ===
Illinois Secretary of State Jim Edgar defeated investor and conservative political activist Steve Baer, as well as perennial candidate Robert Marshall.

Republican gubernatorial primary
Party	Candidate	Votes	%
Republican	Jim Edgar	482,441	62.84
Republican	Steve Baer	256,889	33.46
Republican	Robert Marshall	28,365	3.69
Total votes		767,695	100

=== Lieutenant governor ===
Illinois State Senator Bob Kustra won the Republican primary for lieutenant governor.

Republican lieutenant gubernatorial primary
Party	Candidate	Votes	%
Republican	Bob Kustra	584,121	100
Republican	Henry Gillman	38	0.00
Total votes		584,159	100

== Solidarity primary ==
Only 13 votes were cast in the primary, all write in votes for Jeff W. Smith. The party, nevertheless, ultimately nominated Jessie Fields.

=== Governor ===
Solidarity gubernatorial primary
Party	Candidate	Votes	%
Write-in	Jeff W. Smith	13	100
Total votes		13	100

== General election ==
The race was highly competitive and widely regarded as a toss-up. The central issue in the campaign was the state's temporary 20% income tax surcharge, which had been enacted to provide additional funding for public schools and local governments. Edgar favored making the surcharge permanent, whereas Hartigan opposed its extension, arguing that the additional education funding could instead come from a 2% reduction in overall state expenditures.

Hartigan's opposition to extending the income tax surcharge and his "Time for a Change" campaign theme helped him outperform typical Democratic margins in traditionally Republican areas, including Downstate Illinois and the collar counties. However, despite his deep roots in Chicago politics, these gains were offset by his underperformance in the city, where low turnout among Black voters resulted in his narrow defeat. Many Black voters remained disaffected by Hartigan's initial support for his longtime political ally, Thomas Hynes, a white third-party candidate who challenged incumbent Harold Washington, Chicago's first Black mayor, in the 1987 mayoral election. This lingering dissatisfaction contributed to lower Black voter turnout in the city, allowing Edgar to capture 20% of Chicago's Black vote. This was an unexpectedly strong showing for a Republican gubernatorial candidate and helped secure his victory.

=== Debate ===
1990 Illinois gubernatorial election debate
No.	Date	Host	Moderator(s)	Link	Republican	Democratic
Key: P Participant A Absent N Not invited I Invited W Withdrawn						
Key: P Participant A Absent N Not invited I Invited W Withdrawn					Jim Edgar	Neil Hartigan
1	Oct. 19, 1990	League of Women Voters of Illinois; WTTW-TV	Lynn Sweet, George Barbosa, Kathy Best	C-SPAN	P	P

=== Results ===
1990 gubernatorial election, Illinois
Party	Candidate	Votes	%	±%
Republican	Jim Edgar	1,653,126	50.75	−1.92
Democratic	Neil Hartigan	1,569,217	48.17	+41.53
Illinois Solidarity	Jessie Fields	35,067	1.08	−38.89
Majority		83,909	2.58	−10.12
Turnout		3,257,410		
Republican hold		Swing		
