= Corinne Wood =

American politician (1954–2021)

44th Lieutenant Governor of Illinois
- In office January 11, 1999 – January 13, 2003
- Governor: George Ryan
- Preceded by: Bob Kustra
- Succeeded by: Pat Quinn

Member of the Illinois House of Representatives from the 59th district
- In office January 10, 1997 – January 10, 1999
- Preceded by: Thomas F. Lachner
- Succeeded by: Mary Beattie

Personal details
- Born: Corinne Joyce Gieseke; May 28, 1954 Barrington, Illinois, U.S.
- Died: May 18, 2021 (aged 66)
- Party: Republican
- Spouse: Paul Wood
- Children: 3
- Education: University of Illinois (BS); Loyola University (JD)
- Profession: Attorney

Corinne Gieseke Wood (née Gieseke; May 28, 1954 – May 18, 2021) was an American politician who served as the 44th lieutenant governor of Illinois from 1999 to 2003. She previously served as a Republican member of the Illinois House of Representatives from 1997 to 1999. She was the first woman to become Illinois' lieutenant governor.

== Early life ==
Corinne Gieseke was born on May 28, 1954, in Barrington, Illinois. Gieseke graduated Phi Beta Kappa with a Bachelor of Science from the University of Illinois and a Juris Doctor from Loyola University. After graduation, Gieseke was named general counsel to the Illinois Commissioner of Banks and Trusts, later joining the Chicago law firm Hopkins & Sutter.

== Illinois House of Representatives ==
Wood was elected as state representative to the 59th district in 1996.

While in the House, Wood served on the Aging, Appropriations-Education, Financial Institutions, and Labor & Commerce committees, as well as the Legislative Research Unit.

=== 1998 Illinois gubernatorial election ===
In March, Ryan and Wood won their Republican primary elections, with Wood unopposed for lieutenant governor. In November, the Ryan/Wood ticket won the general election with 51% of the vote. Wood was sworn in as lieutenant governor on January 11, 1999.

== Lieutenant Governor of Illinois ==
As Lieutenant Governor, Wood was a frequent advocate across Illinois on several prominent issues, including rural affairs, economic development, and women's health. In December 1999, Wood gained national prominence for leading an internet campaign against Abercrombie & Fitch for sexually provocative pictures in the catalog, pushing for a boycott and letter-writing campaign.

She also launched a statewide campaign to increase funding for breast cancer research through the "A Check for a Cure" Illinois tax return check-off when she first entered office.

=== 2002 gubernatorial campaign ===
In 2002, Wood sought the Republican nomination for governor of Illinois. Her fellow GOP contenders were attorney general Jim Ryan and state senator Patrick O'Malley. She ultimately lost the primary, finishing third with around 27% of the vote.

== Personal life ==
Corinne was married to Paul Wood. They had three children.

=== Death ===
Corinne battled breast cancer in the late 1990s and announced that she was resuming treatment in January 2006. She died after a 15-year battle with the disease on May 18, 2021, aged 66.

== See also ==
- List of female lieutenant governors in the United States

Party political offices
Preceded by Bob Kustra	Republican nominee for Lieutenant Governor of Illinois; 1998	Succeeded by Carl Hawkinson
Illinois House of Representatives
Preceded by Thomas F. Lachner	Member of the Illinois House of Representatives from the 59th district 1997–1999	Succeeded by Mary Beattie
Political offices
Preceded by Bob Kustra	Lieutenant Governor of Illinois; 1999–2003	Succeeded by Pat Quinn
