= David N. Barkhausen =

American politician, lawyer, and businessman

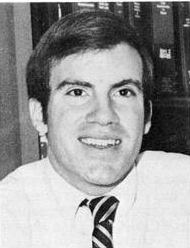
official portrait, circa 1981

David N. Barkhausen (born January 31, 1950) is an American politician, lawyer, and businessman.

Born in Lake Forest, Illinois, Barkhausen went to Choate Rosemary Hall in Wallingford, Connecticut. He then received his bachelor's degree from Princeton University and his Juris Doctor degree from Southern Illinois University School of Law. Barkhausen practiced law and served an Illinois assistant attorney general. He was also in the life insurance business. Barkhausen served in the Illinois House of Representatives from 1981 to 1985 and was a Republican. He then served in the Illinois Senate from 1985 to 1997. In an upset, Democratic candidate Terry Link defeated Thomas Lachner, a Republican member of the Illinois House of Representatives, to succeed Barkhausen.
