= Susan Garrett =

American politician

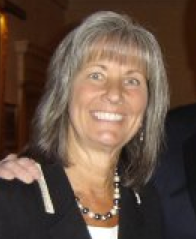

Member of the Illinois Senate from the 29th district
- In office 2003–2013
- Preceded by: Kathy Parker
- Succeeded by: Julie Morrison

Member of the Illinois House of Representatives from the 59th district
- In office 1999–2003
- Preceded by: Mary Beattie
- Succeeded by: Kathleen A. Ryg

Personal details
- Born: February 11, 1950 (age 76) Lake Forest, Illinois, U.S.
- Party: Democratic
- Spouse: Scott Garrett

Susan Garrett is a former Democratic member of the Illinois Senate, who represented the 29th District from 2003 to 2013, and the 59th district of the Illinois House of Representatives for four years previously. The 29th district includes all or parts of Bannockburn, Deerfield, Des Plaines, Fort Sheridan, Glencoe, Glenview, Highland Park, Highwood, Knollwood, Lake Bluff, Lake Forest, Mount Prospect, Niles, Northbrook, Park Ridge, Prospect Heights and Riverwoods.

Following the 2000 census, the district boundaries were redrawn by Democratic legislators. The new map made the district more favorable to Democrats and Republican incumbent senator Kathy Parker lost her seat to Garrett in 2002. During her tenure in the Illinois House, Garret proposed legislation to limit campaign contributions from government employees to their supervisors and from special interest groups. After her election to the state Senate, she was named vice chair of the Government Ethics Reform Committee. In July 2011, Garrett announced she would not seek re-election to the state senate in 2012.

== Personal background ==
Garrett lives in Lake Forest with her husband, Scott. They have two adult children, Brett and Elizabeth. Garrett received her bachelor's degree in political science from Lake Forest College in 1994, and worked as a marketing consultant before becoming a full-time legislator.
