= Lockheed C-130 Hercules =

American military transport aircraft

C-130 Hercules
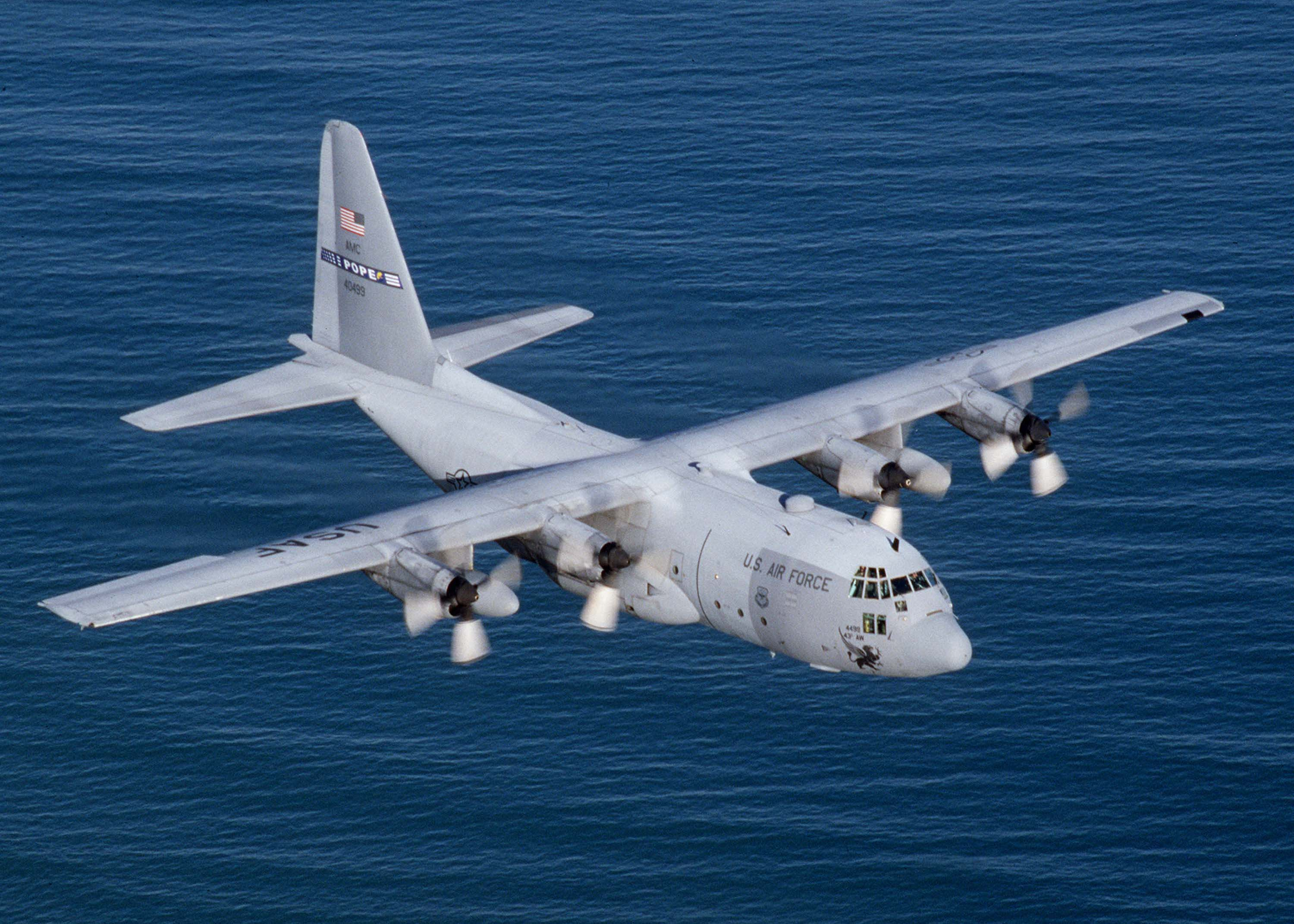
- A United States Air Force C-130E

General information
- Type: Tactical airlifter
- National origin: United States
- Manufacturer: Lockheed Corporation; Lockheed Martin
- Status: In service
- Primary users: United States Air Force: United States Navy; United States Coast Guard; United States Marine Corps
- Number built: 2,700+ (as of June 2024)

History
- Manufactured: 1954–present
- Introduction date: December 1956
- First flight: August 23, 1954; 72 years ago
- Variants: Lockheed AC-130; Lockheed DC-130; Lockheed EC-130; Lockheed EC-130H Compass Call; Lockheed HC-130; Lockheed Martin KC-130; Lockheed LC-130; Lockheed MC-130; Lockheed RC-130; Lockheed WC-130; Lockheed L-100 Hercules; Lockheed Martin C-130J Super Hercules

The Lockheed C-130 Hercules is an American, four-engined, turboprop, military transport aircraft designed and built by Lockheed (now Lockheed Martin). Capable of using unprepared runways for takeoffs and landings, the C-130 was designed as a troop, medical evacuation, and cargo transport aircraft. Its versatile airframe has found other uses, including as a gunship (AC-130), for airborne assault, search and rescue, scientific research support, weather reconnaissance, aerial refueling, maritime patrol, and aerial firefighting. It is the main tactical airlifter for many military forces worldwide. More than 40 variants of the Hercules, including civilian versions marketed as the Lockheed L-100, operate in more than 60 nations.

The C-130 entered service with the U.S. in 1956, followed by Australia and many other nations. During its years of service, the Hercules has participated in numerous military, civilian, and humanitarian aid operations. In 2007, the transport became the fifth aircraft (Note: After the English Electric Canberra, B-52 Stratofortress, Tupolev Tu-95, and KC-135 Stratotanker.) to mark 50 years of continuous service with its original primary customer, which for the C-130 is the United States Air Force (USAF). The C-130 is the longest continuously produced military aircraft, having achieved 70 years of production in 2024.

== Design and development ==
=== Background and requirements ===
The Korean War showed that World War II-era piston-engined transports—Fairchild C-119 Flying Boxcars, Douglas C-47 Skytrains, and Curtiss C-46 Commandos—were no longer adequate. On 2 February 1951, the United States Air Force (USAF) issued a General Operating Requirement for a new transport to Boeing, Douglas, Fairchild, Lockheed, Martin, Chase Aircraft, North American, Northrop, and Airlifts Inc.

The new transport was to have a capacity of 92 passengers, 72 combat troops, or 64 paratroopers in a cargo compartment that was about 41 ft (12 m) long, 9 ft (2.7 m) high, and 10 ft (3.0 m) wide. Unlike transports derived from passenger airliners, it was to be designed specifically as a combat transport with loading from a hinged loading ramp at the rear of the fuselage. A notable advance for large aircraft was the introduction of a turboprop powerplant, the Allison T56, which was developed for the C-130. It gave the aircraft greater range than a turbojet engine, as it used less fuel. Turboprop engines also produced much more power for their weight than piston engines. However, the turboprop configuration chosen for the T56, with the propeller connected to the compressor, had the potential to cause structural failure of the aircraft if an engine failed. Safety devices had to be incorporated to reduce the excessive drag from a windmilling propeller.

=== Design phase ===
The Hercules resembles a larger, four-engined version of the Fairchild C-123 Provider, with a similar wing and cargo ramp layout. The C-123 had evolved from the Chase XCG-20 Avitruc first flown in 1950. The Boeing C-97 Stratofreighter had rear ramps, which made driving vehicles onto the airplane possible (also possible with the forward ramp on a C-124). The ramp on the Hercules was also used to airdrop cargo, which included a low-altitude parachute-extraction system for Sheridan tanks and even dropping large, improvised "daisy cutter" bombs. The new Lockheed cargo plane had a range of 1,100 nmi (1,270 mi; 2,040 km), and it could operate from short and unprepared strips.

Fairchild, North American, Martin, and Northrop declined to participate in the competition. The remaining five companies submitted 10 design proposals: Lockheed presented two, Boeing one, Chase three, Douglas three, and Airlifts Inc. one. The competition ultimately narrowed to a close contest between the lighter of Lockheed's two submissions, designated the preliminary L-206 project, and a four-turboprop aircraft design proposed by Douglas.

The Lockheed design team was led by Willis Hawkins, starting with a 130-page proposal for the Lockheed L-206. Hall Hibbard, Lockheed vice president and chief engineer, saw the proposal and directed it to Kelly Johnson, who did not care for the low-speed, unarmed aircraft, and remarked, "If you sign that letter, you will destroy the Lockheed Company." Both Hibbard and Johnson signed the proposal and the company won the contract for the now-designated Model 82 on 2 July 1951.

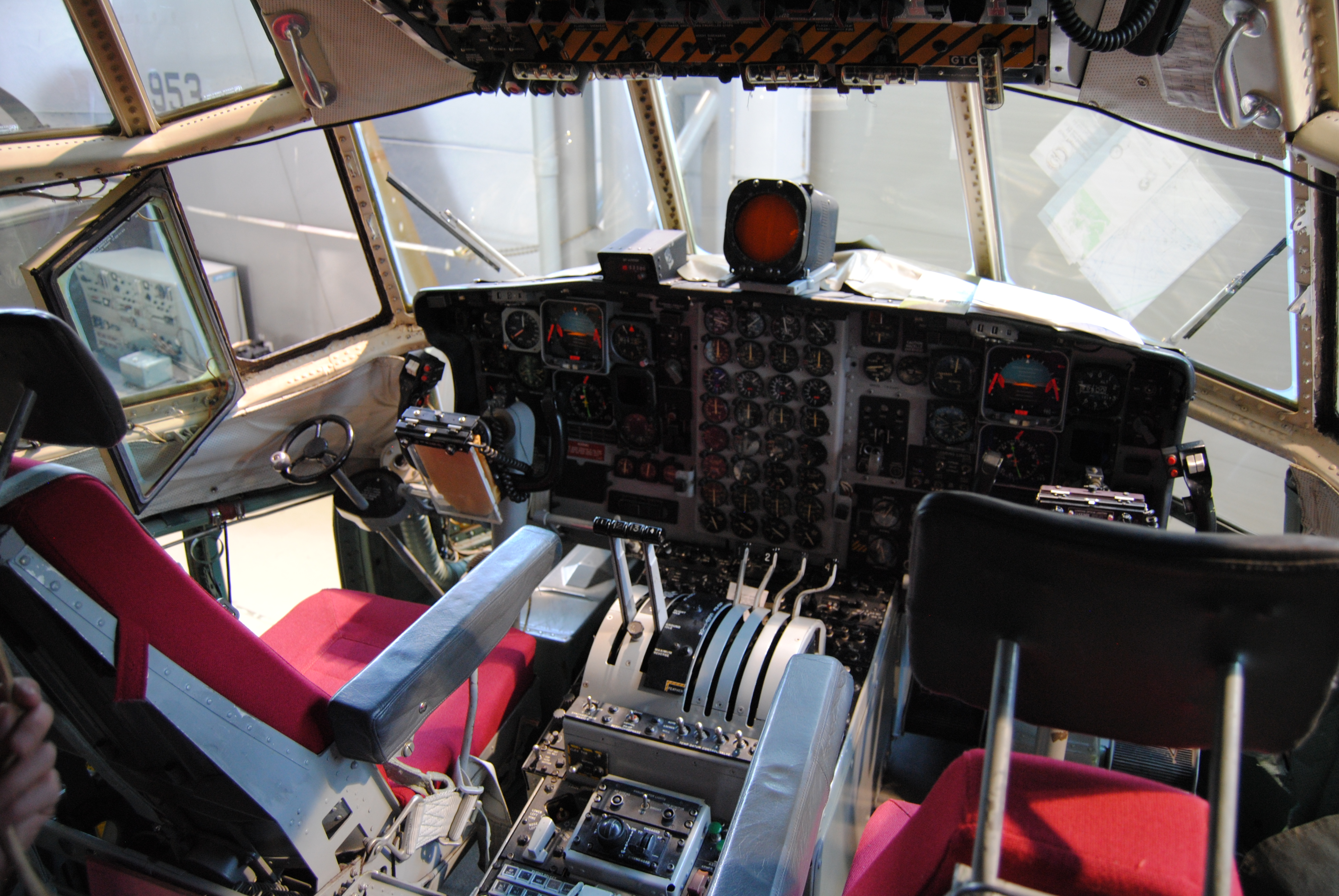
A C-130H Hercules flight deck: Aircraft displayed are from the Norwegian Armed Forces Aircraft Collection.

The first flight of the YC-130 prototype was made on 23 August 1954 from the Lockheed plant in Burbank, California. The aircraft, serial number 53-3397, was the second prototype, but the first of the two to fly. The YC-130 was piloted by Stanley Beltz and Roy Wimmer on its 61-minute flight to Edwards Air Force Base; Jack Real and Dick Stanton served as flight engineers. Kelly Johnson flew chase in a Lockheed P2V Neptune.

After the two prototypes were completed, production began in Marietta, Georgia, where over 2,300 C-130s have been built through 2009.

The initial production model, the C-130A, was powered by Allison T56-A-9 turboprops with three-bladed propellers and originally equipped with the blunt nose of the prototypes. Deliveries began in December 1956, continuing until the introduction of the C-130B model in 1959. Some A-models were equipped with skis and redesignated C-130D. As the C-130A became operational with Tactical Air Command, the C-130's lack of range became apparent and additional fuel capacity was added with wing pylon-mounted tanks outboard of the engines; this added 6,000 pounds (2,700 kg) of fuel capacity for a total capacity of 40,000 pounds (18,000 kg).

=== Naming ===
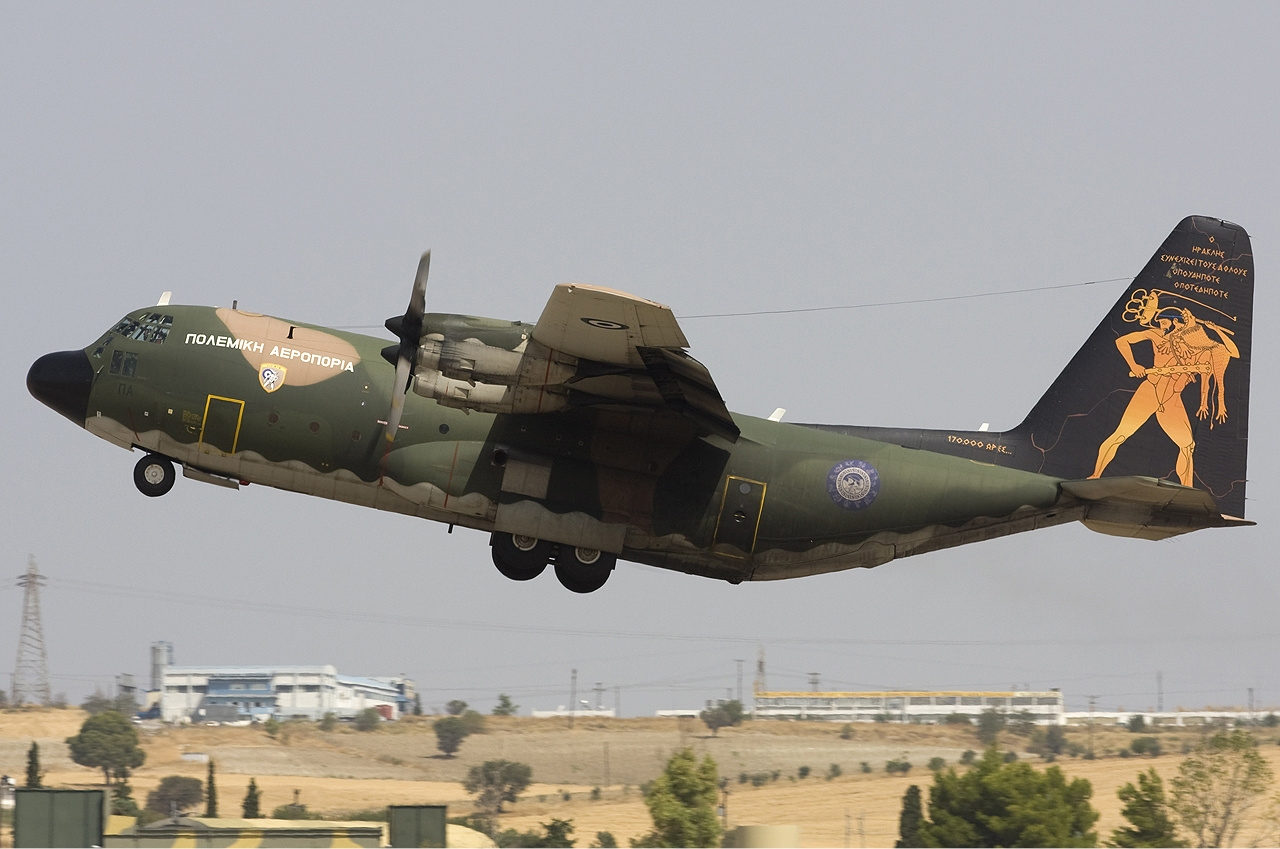
A C-130 Hercules of the Hellenic Air Force, with a livery depicting the mythological hero Hercules in the style of Ancient Greek vase painting

The C-130 was named "Hercules" by its manufacturer, Lockheed, after the Greek mythological hero known for his strength, courage, and perseverance. Hercules is also the name of a constellation, which fits the company's tradition of naming aircraft after celestial constellations, along with the P-2V Neptune and P-3 Orion.

Among the U.S. Armed Forces personnel, the C-130 is nicknamed in military slang as the "Herk" or "Herky Bird".

Due to its versatile airframe and multiple variants designed for diverse military applications and missions, on which it has served from the 1950s to the present day, its name has also been described as fitting for its achievements in military history, with the Royal Australian Air Force (RAAF) comparing it to the legendary feats and labours of Hercules.

As a homage to the feats of the aircraft and of its namesake, the Hellenic Air Force painted one of its C-130 aircraft with a livery depicting Hercules in the style of Ancient Greek vase painting, with the inscription, "Expanding the legendary feats of Hercules".

=== Improved versions ===
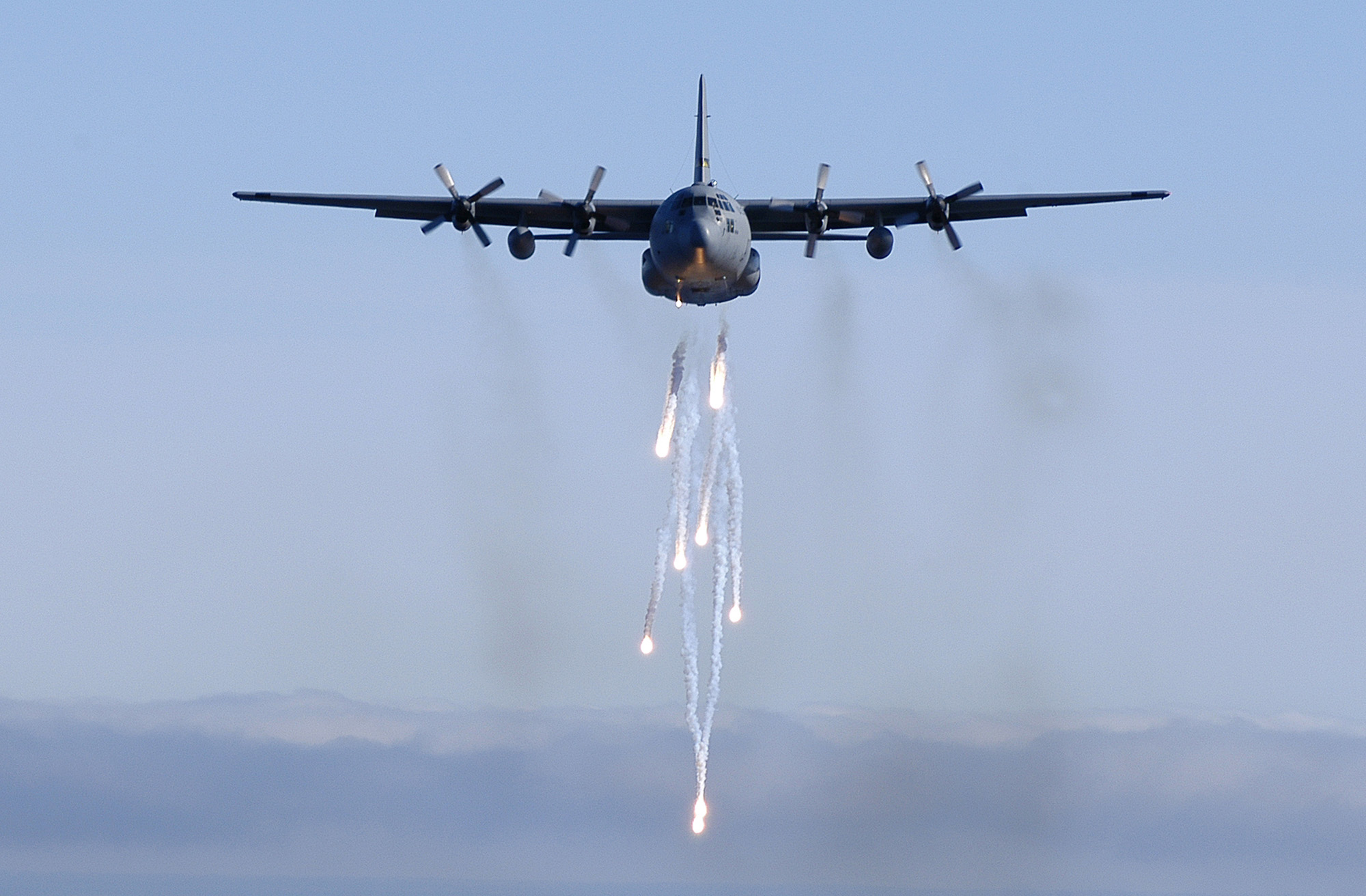
A Michigan Air National Guard C-130E dispatches its flares during a low-level training mission.

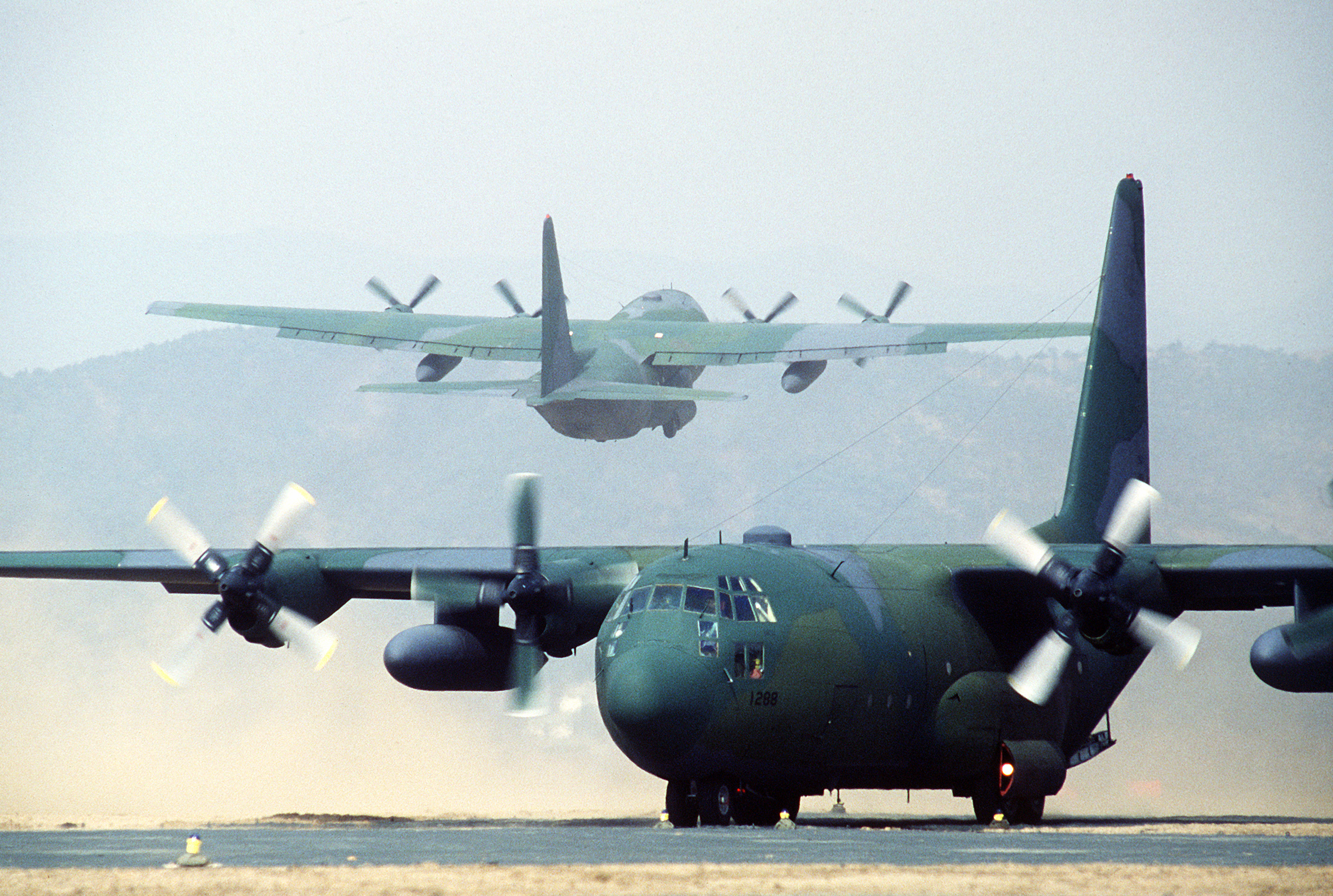
Two C-130 Hercules in South Korea, 1984

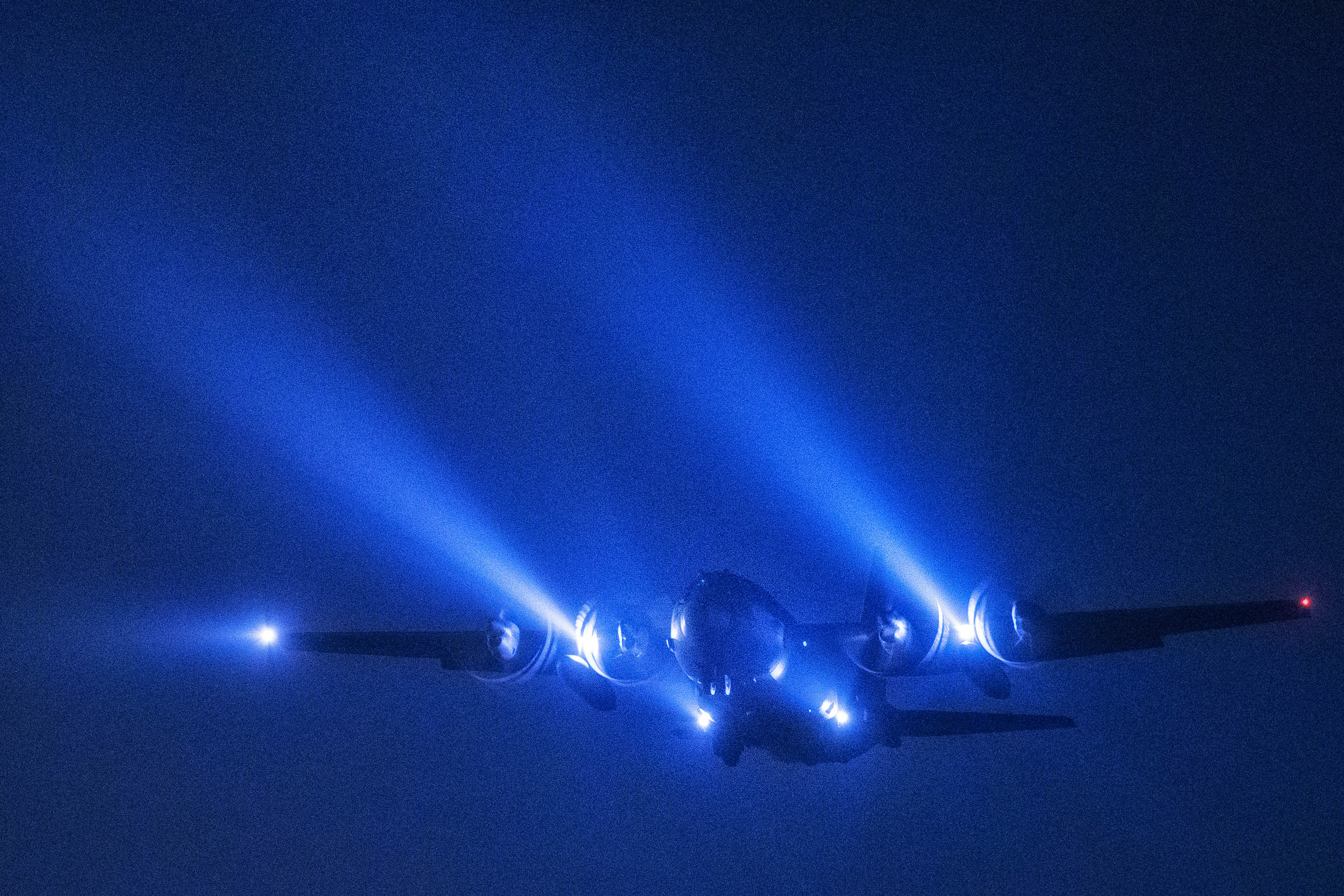
A C-130 conducts a night flight mission over Yokota Air Base.

The C-130B model was developed to complement the A-models that had previously been delivered, and incorporated new features, particularly increased fuel capacity in the form of auxiliary tanks built into the center wing section and an AC electrical system. Four-bladed Hamilton Standard propellers replaced the Aero Products' three-bladed propellers that distinguished the earlier A-models. The C-130B had ailerons operated by hydraulic pressure that was increased from 2,050 to 3,000 psi (14.1 to 20.7 MPa), as well as uprated engines and four-bladed propellers that were standard until the J-model.

The B model was originally intended to have "blown controls", a system that blows high-pressure air over the control surfaces to improve their effectiveness during slow flight. It was tested on an NC-130B prototype aircraft with a pair of T-56 turbines providing high-pressure air through a duct system to the control surfaces and flaps during landing. This greatly reduced landing speed to just 63 knots and cut landing distance in half. The system never entered service because it did not improve takeoff performance by the same margin, making the landing performance pointless if the aircraft could not also take off from where it had landed.

An electronic-reconnaissance variant of the C-130B was designated C-130B-II. In total, 13 aircraft were converted. The C-130B-II was distinguished by its false external wing fuel tanks, which were disguised signals intelligence receiver antennas. These pods were slightly larger than the standard wing tanks found on other C-130Bs. Most aircraft featured a swept-blade antenna on the upper fuselage, as well as extra wire antennas between the vertical fin and upper fuselage not found on other C-130s. Radio call numbers on the tails of these aircraft were regularly changed to confuse observers and disguise their true mission.

The extended-range C-130E model entered service in 1962 after it was developed as an interim long-range transport for the Military Air Transport Service. Essentially a B-model, the new designation was the result of the installation of 1,360 US gallons (5,100 litres) external fuel tanks under each wing's midsection and more powerful Allison T56-A-7A turboprops. The hydraulic boost pressure to the ailerons was reduced back to 2,050 psi (14.1 MPa) as a consequence of the external tanks' weight in the middle of the wingspan. The E model also featured structural improvements, avionics upgrades, and a higher gross weight. Australia took delivery of 12 C-130Es during 1966–67 to supplement the 12 C-130A models already in service with the RAAF. Sweden and Spain fly the TP-84T version of the C-130E fitted for aerial refueling capability.

The KC-130 tankers, originally C-130F procured for the US Marine Corps (USMC) in 1958 (under the designation GV-1) are equipped with a removable 3,600 US gallons (14,000 L) stainless steel fuel tank carried inside the cargo compartment. The two wing-mounted, hose-and-drogue, aerial-refueling pods each transfer up to 300 US gallons per minute (1,100 L/min) to two aircraft simultaneously, allowing for rapid cycle times of multiple-receiver aircraft formations, (a typical tanker formation of four aircraft in less than 30 minutes). The Navy's C-130G has increased structural strength, allowing higher-gross-weight operation.

=== Further developments ===
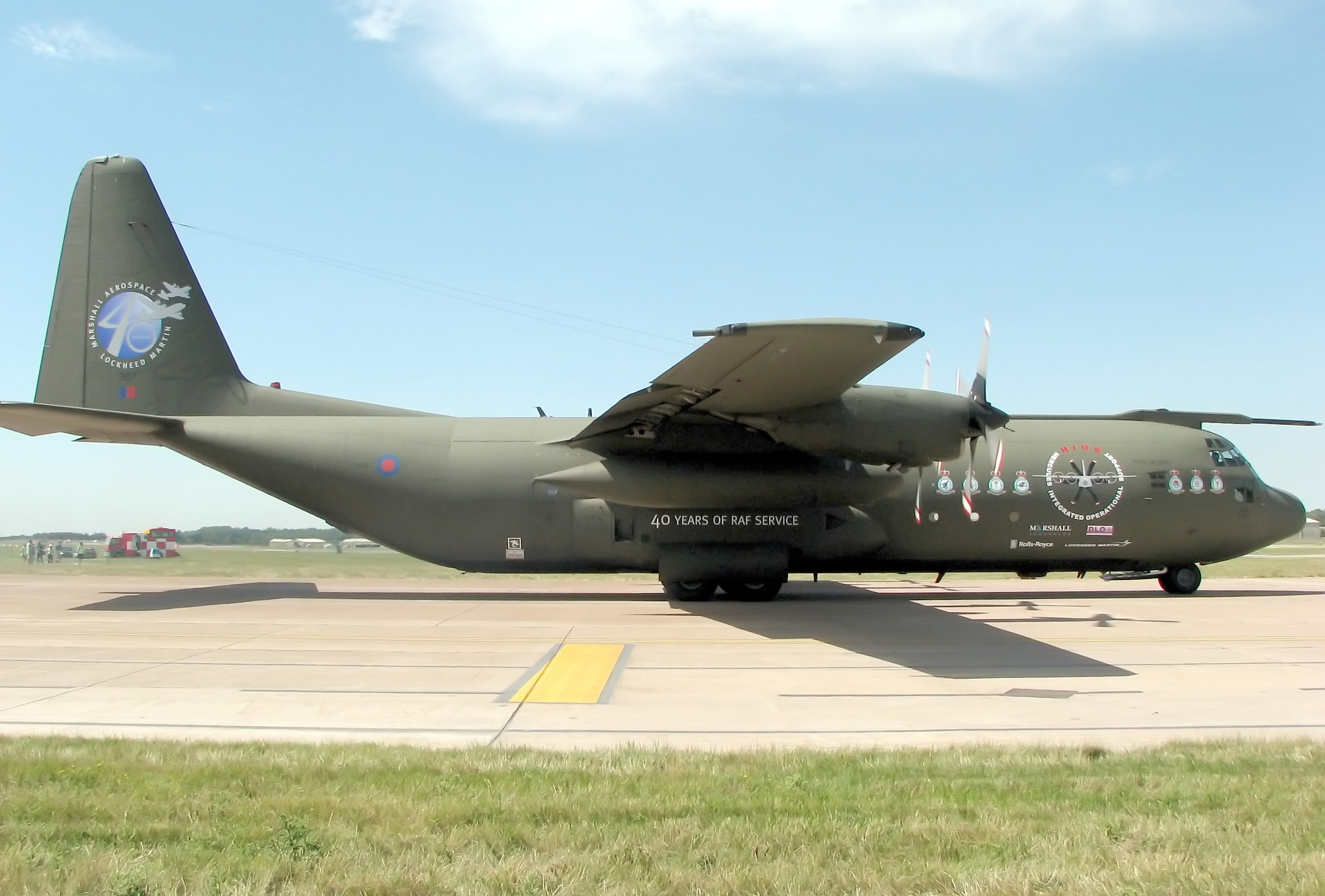
A Royal Air Force C-130K (C.3)

The C-130H model has updated Allison T56-A-15 turboprops, a redesigned outer wing, updated avionics, and other minor improvements. Later H models had a new, fatigue-life-improved, center wing that was retrofitted to many earlier H models. For structural reasons, some models are required to land with reduced amounts of fuel when carrying heavy cargo, reducing usable range.

The H model remains in widespread use with the USAF and many foreign air forces. Initial deliveries began in 1964 (to the Royal New Zealand Air Force, remaining in production until 1996. An improved C-130H was introduced in 1974, with Australia purchasing 12 of the type in 1978 to replace the original 12 C-130A models, which had first entered RAAF service in 1958. The U.S. Coast Guard (USCG) employs the HC-130H for long-range search-and-rescue, drug interdiction, illegal migrant patrols, homeland security, and logistics.

C-130H models produced from 1992 to 1996 were designated as C-130H3 by the USAF, with the "3" denoting the third variation in design for the H series. Improvements included ring laser gyros for the inertial guidance systems, GPS receivers, a partial glass cockpit (ADI and HSI instruments), a more capable APN-241 color radar, night vision device-compatible instrument lighting, and an integrated radar and missile-warning system. The electrical system upgrade included generator control units and bus switching units to provide stable power to the more sensitive, upgraded components.

The equivalent model for export to the UK is the C-130K, known by the Royal Air Force (RAF) as the Hercules C.1. The C-130H-30 (Hercules C.3 in RAF service) is a stretched version of the original Hercules, achieved by inserting a 100 in (2.5 m) plug aft of the cockpit and an 80 in (2.0 m) plug at the rear of the fuselage. A single C-130K was purchased by the Met Office for use by its Meteorological Research Flight, where it was classified as the Hercules W.2. This aircraft was heavily modified, with its most prominent feature being the long, red-and-white-striped, atmospheric probe on the nose and the move of the weather radar into a pod above the forward fuselage. This aircraft, named Snoopy, was withdrawn in 2001 and was then modified by Marshall of Cambridge Aerospace as a flight testbed for the A400M turbine engine, the TP400. The C-130K is used by the RAF Falcons for parachute drops. Three C-130Ks (Hercules C Mk.1P) were upgraded and sold to the Austrian Air Force in 2002.

=== Enhanced models ===
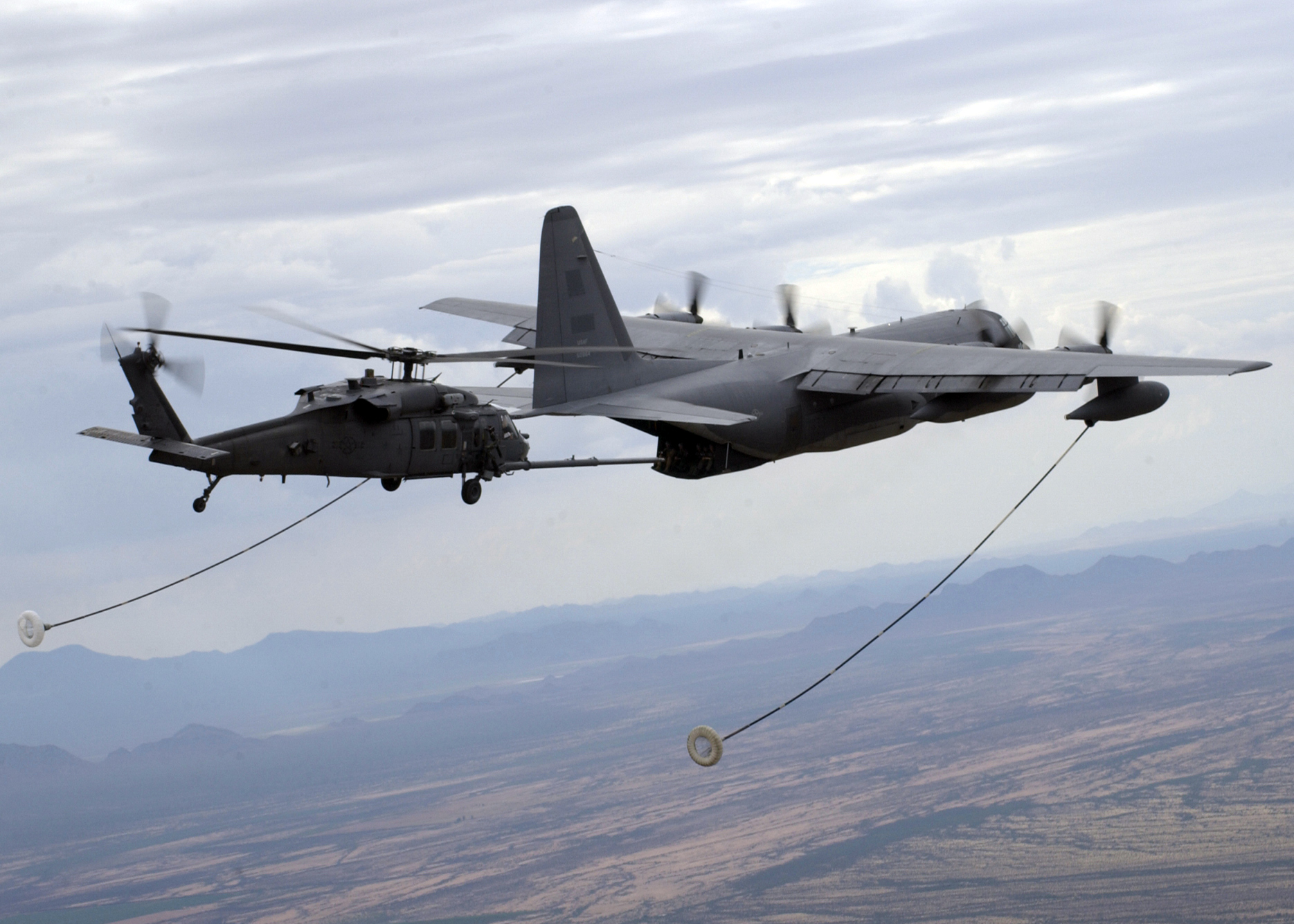
A USAF HC-130P refuels a HH-60G Pavehawk helicopter

The MC-130E Combat Talon was developed for the USAF during the Vietnam War to support special-operations missions in Southeast Asia; it led to the MC-130H Combat Talon II and a family of other special-missions aircraft; 37 of the earliest models currently operating with the Air Force Special Operations Command (AFSOC) are scheduled to be replaced by new-production MC-130J versions. The EC-130 Commando Solo is another special-missions variant within AFSOC, albeit operated solely by an AFSOC-gained wing in the Pennsylvania Air National Guard, and is a psychological operations/information operations (PSYOP/IO) platform equipped as an aerial radio station and television stations able to transmit messaging over commercial frequencies. Other versions of the EC-130, most notably the EC-130H Compass Call, are also special variants, but are assigned to the Air Combat Command. The AC-130 gunship was first developed during the Vietnam War to provide close air support and other ground-attack duties.

The HC-130 is a family of long-range, search-and-rescue (SAR) variants used by the USAF and USCG. Equipped for the deep deployment of pararescuemen, survival equipment, and (in the case of USAF versions) aerial refueling of combat rescue helicopters, HC-130s are usually the on-scene command aircraft for combat SAR missions (USAF only) and noncombat SAR (USAF and USCG). Early USAF versions were also equipped with the Fulton surface-to-air recovery system, designed to pull a person off the ground using a wire strung from a helium balloon. The John Wayne movie The Green Berets features its use. The Fulton system was later removed when aerial refueling of helicopters proved safer and more versatile. The movie The Perfect Storm depicts a real-life SAR mission involving aerial refueling of a New York Air National Guard HH-60G by a New York Air National Guard HC-130P.

The C-130R and C-130T are US Navy and USMC models, both equipped with underwing external fuel tanks. The USN C-130T is similar but has additional avionics improvements. In both models, aircraft are equipped with Allison T56-A-16 engines. The USMC versions are designated KC-130R or KC-130T when equipped with underwing refueling pods and pylons and are fully night-vision system compatible.

The RC-130 is a reconnaissance version developed during the Cold War. Sometimes called "ferret" aircraft, these planes were initially retrofitted standard C-130s.

The Lockheed L-100 (L-382) is a civilian variant, equivalent to a C-130E model without military equipment. The L-100 also has two stretched versions.

=== Next generation ===
In the 1970s, Lockheed proposed a C-130 variant with turbofan engines rather than turboprops, but the USAF preferred the takeoff performance of the existing aircraft. In the 1980s, the C-130 was intended to be replaced by the Advanced Medium STOL Transport project. The project was canceled and the C-130 has remained in production.

Building on lessons learned, Lockheed Martin modified a commercial variant of the C-130 into a High Technology Test Bed (HTTB). This HTTB set numerous short-takeoff-and-landing performance records and significantly expanded the database for future derivatives of the C-130. Modifications made to the HTTB included extended chord ailerons, a long chord rudder, fast-acting, double-slotted trailing-edge flaps, a high-camber, wing leading-edge extension, a larger dorsal fin and dorsal fins, the addition of three spoiler panels to each wing upper surface, a long-stroke, main- and nose-landing-gear system, and changes to the flight controls and a change from direct mechanical linkages assisted by hydraulic boost to fully powered controls, in which the mechanical linkages from the flight station controls operated only the hydraulic control valves of the appropriate boost unit.

The HTTB first flew on 19 June 1984, with civilian registration N130X. After demonstrating many new technologies, some of which were applied to the C-130J, the HTTB was lost in a fatal accident on 3 February 1993, at Dobbins Air Reserve Base, in Marietta, Georgia. The crash was attributed to disengagement of the rudder fly-by-wire flight control system, resulting in a total loss of rudder control capability while conducting ground minimum control speed tests. The disengagement was a result of the inadequate design of the rudder's integrated actuator package by its manufacturer; the operator's insufficient system safety review failed to consider the consequences of the inadequate design to all operating regimens. A factor that contributed to the accident was the flight crew's lack of engineering flight test training.

In the 1990s, the improved C-130J Super Hercules was developed by Lockheed (later Lockheed Martin). This model is the newest version and the only model now in production. Externally similar to the classic Hercules in general appearance, the J model has new turboprop engines, six-bladed propellers, digital avionics, and other new systems.

=== Upgrades and changes ===
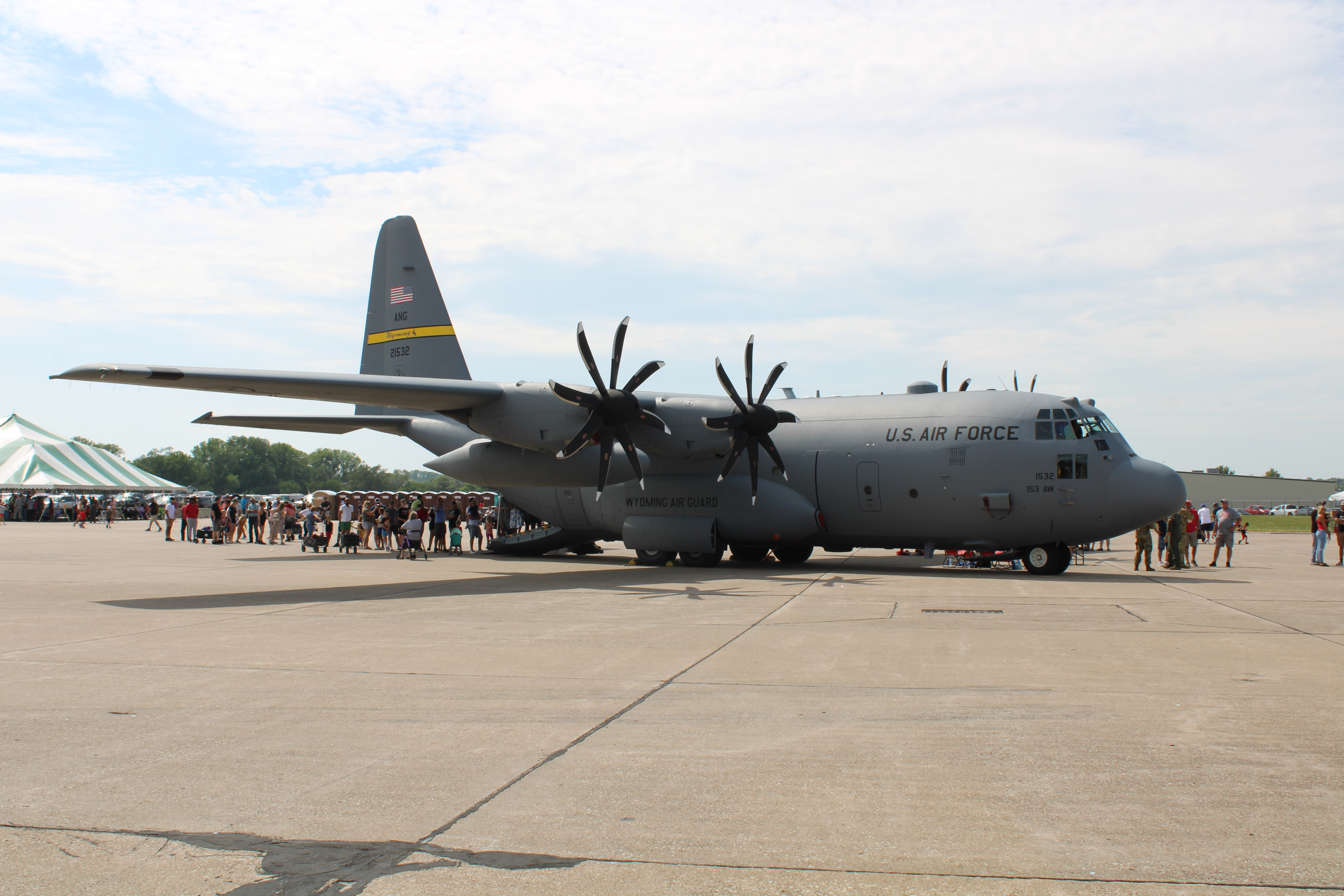
C-130H with eight-bladed NP2000 propellers

In 2000, Boeing was awarded a US$1.4 billion contract to develop an Avionics Modernization Program kit for the C-130. The program was hindered with delays and cost overruns until project restructuring in 2007. In September 2009, it was reported that the planned Avionics Modernization Program (AMP) upgrade to the older C-130s would be dropped to provide more funds for the F-35, CV-22, and airborne tanker-replacement programs. However, in June 2010, Department of Defense approved funding for the initial production of the AMP upgrade kits. Under the terms of this agreement, the USAF has cleared Boeing to begin low-rate initial production for the C-130 AMP. A total of 198 aircraft is expected to feature the AMP upgrade. The current cost per aircraft is US$14 million, although Boeing expects that this price will drop to US$7 million for the 69th aircraft.

In the 2000s, Lockheed Martin and the USAF began outfitting and retrofitting C-130s with the eight-bladed UTC Aerospace Systems NP2000 propellers. An engine enhancement program saving fuel and providing lower temperatures in the T56 engine has been approved, and the USAF expects to save $2 billion (~$2.72 billion in 2025) and extend the fleet life.

In 2021, the USAF Research Laboratory demonstrated the Rapid Dragon system, which transforms the C-130 into a lethal strike platform capable of launching 12 JASSM-ERs with 500 kg warheads from a standoff distance of 925 km (575 mi). Future anticipated improvements include support for JDAM-ER, mine laying, drone dispersal, and improved standoff range when 1,900 km (1,200 mi) JASSM-XR becomes available in 2024.

=== Replacement ===
In October 2010, the USAF released a capability request for information for the development of a new airlifter to replace the C-130. The new aircraft was to carry a 190% greater payload and assume the mission of mounted vertical maneuver. The greater payload and mission would enable it to carry medium-weight armored vehicles and unload them at locations without long runways. Various options were under consideration, including new or upgraded fixed-wing designs, rotorcraft, tiltrotors, or even an airship. The C-130 fleet of around 450 planes would be replaced by only 250 aircraft. The USAF had attempted to replace the C-130 in the 1970s through the Advanced Medium STOL Transport project, which resulted in the C-17 Globemaster III that instead replaced the C-141 Starlifter.

The Air Force Research Laboratory (AFRL) funded Lockheed Martin and Boeing demonstrators for the Speed Agile concept, which had the goal of making aircraft that could take off and land at speeds as low as 70 kn (130 km/h; 81 mph) on airfields less than 2,000 ft (610 m) long and cruise at Mach 0.8-plus. Boeing's design used upper-surface blowing from embedded engines on the inboard wing and blown flaps for circulation control on the outboard wing. Lockheed's design also used blown flaps outboard, but inboard used patented reversing ejector nozzles.

Boeing's design completed over 2,000 hours of wind-tunnel tests in late 2009. It was a 5% scale model of a narrow-body design with a 55,000 lb (25,000 kg) payload. When the AFRL increased the payload requirement to 65,000 lb (29,000 kg), Boeing tested a 5% scale model of a wide-body design with a 303,000 lb (137,000 kg) take-off gross weight and an "A400M-size", 158-in-wide cargo box. It would be powered by four IAE V2533 turbofans.

In August 2011, the AFRL released pictures of the Lockheed Speed Agile concept demonstrator. A 23% scale model went through wind-tunnel tests to demonstrate its hybrid powered lift, which combined a low-drag airframe with simple mechanical assembly to reduce weight and improve aerodynamics. The model had four engines, including two Williams FJ44 turbofans. On 26 March 2013, Boeing was granted a patent for its swept-wing powered lift aircraft.

In January 2014, Air Mobility Command, Air Force Materiel Command, and the AFRL were in the early stages of defining requirements for the C-X next-generation airlifter program to replace both the C-130 and C-17. The aircraft would be produced from the early 2030s to the 2040s.

== Operational history ==
=== Military ===
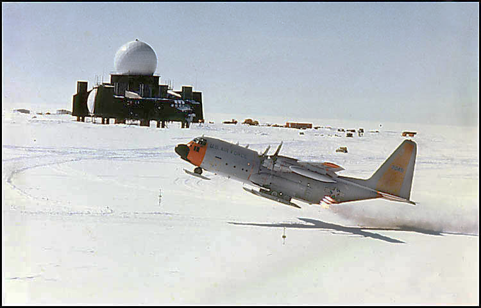
C-130D RATO from DYE 2

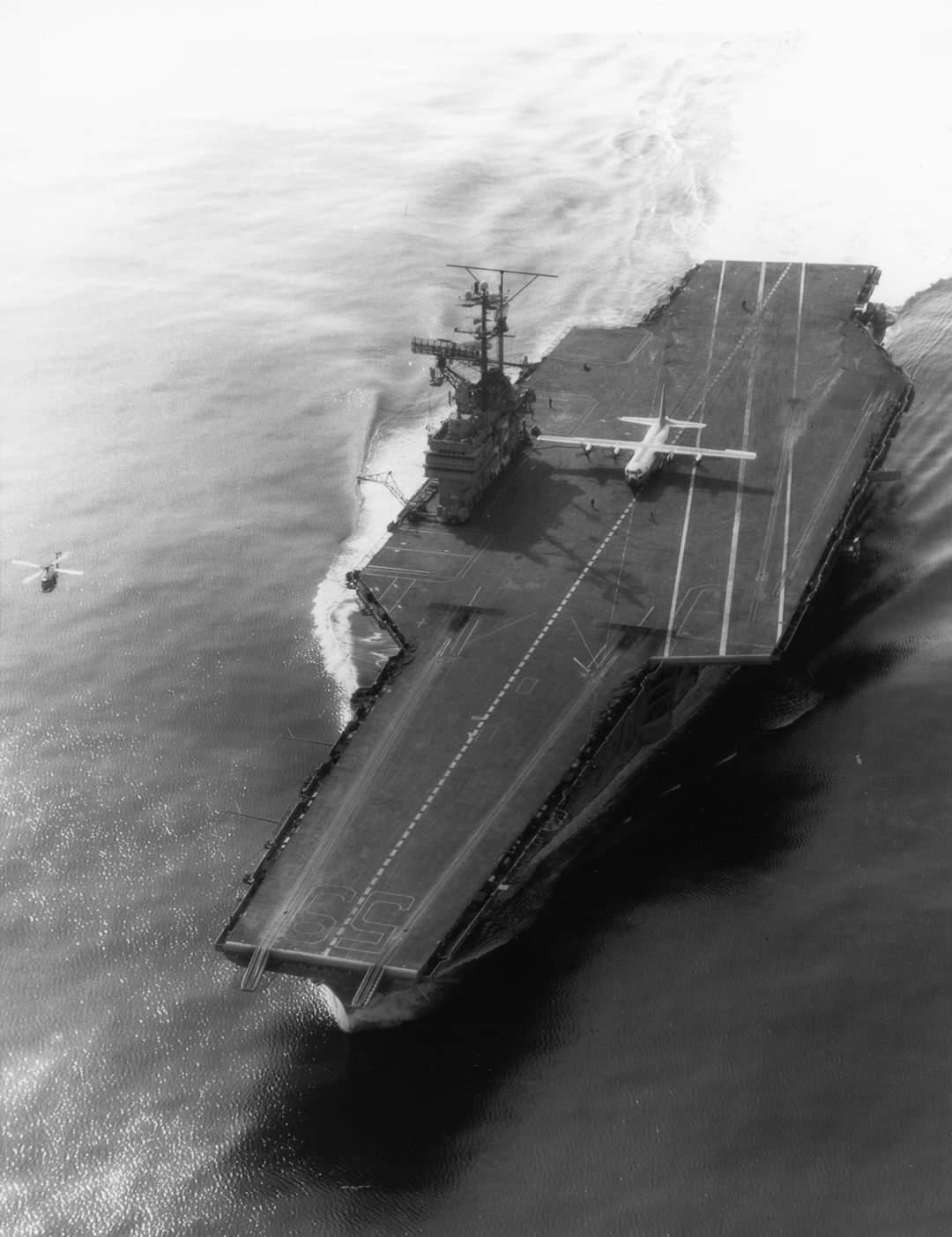
A USMC KC-130F Hercules performing takeoffs and landings aboard the aircraft carrier Forrestal in 1963: The aircraft is now displayed at the National Museum of Naval Aviation.

The first production batch of C-130A aircraft was delivered beginning in 1956 to the 463d Troop Carrier Wing at Ardmore Air Force Base (AFB), Oklahoma, and the 314th Troop Carrier Wing at Sewart AFB, Tennessee. Six additional squadrons were assigned to the 322d Air Division in Europe and the 315th Air Division in the Far East. Additional aircraft were modified for electronics intelligence work and assigned to Rhein-Main Air Base, Germany, while modified RC-130As were assigned to the Military Air Transport Service photo-mapping division. The C-130A entered service with the USAF in December 1956.

In January 1957, Lockheed conducted the first flight of a C-130A (S/N 55-0021) modified with a ski-wheel configuration that could operate from conventional runways and snow- or ice-covered surfaces. In February, Task Force Slide began in Bemidji, Minnesota, to develop, test, and validate procedures for what would become the C-130D. Flights were conducted on the frozen surface of nearby lakes and included rocket-assisted takeoff. Task Force Slide continued into 1958 and by the end of the year, 12 modified C-130As, now designated C-130Ds had been delivered to the 61st Troop Carrier Squadron to support construction of two DEW Line radar sites on the Greenland ice cap. The LC-130H variant remains the largest aircraft in the world capable of landing on snow and ice using skis.

In 1958, a U.S. reconnaissance C-130A-II of the 7406th Support Squadron was shot down over Armenia by four Soviet MiG-17s along the Turkish-Armenian border during a routine mission.

Australia became the first non-American operator of the Hercules, with 12 planes being delivered from late 1958. The Royal Canadian Air Force became another early user with the delivery of four B-models (Canadian designation CC-130 Mk I) in October/November 1960.

In 1963, a Hercules achieved and still holds the record to this day, for the largest and heaviest aircraft to land on an aircraft carrier. During October and November that year, a USMC KC-130F (BuNo 149798), lent to the U.S. Naval Air Test Center, made 29 touch-and-go landings, 21 unarrested, full-stop landings, and 21 unassisted take-offs on Forrestal at a number of different weights. The pilot, Lieutenant (later Rear Admiral) James H. Flatley III, USN, was awarded the Distinguished Flying Cross for his role in this test series. The tests were highly successful, but the aircraft was not deployed this way. Flatley denied that C-130 was tested for carrier onboard delivery operations, or for delivering nuclear weapons. He said that the intention was to support the Lockheed U-2, also being tested on carriers. The Hercules used in the test, most recently in service with Marine Aerial Refueler Squadron 352 (VMGR-352) until 2005, is now part of the collection of the National Museum of Naval Aviation at NAS Pensacola, Florida.

In 1964, C-130 crews from the 6315th Operations Group at Naha Air Base, Okinawa, commenced forward air control (FAC or Flare) missions over the Ho Chi Minh Trail in Laos supporting USAF strike aircraft. In April 1965, the mission was expanded to North Vietnam, where C-130 crews led formations of Martin B-57 Canberra bombers on night reconnaissance/strike missions against communist supply routes leading to South Vietnam. In early 1966, Project Blind Bat/Lamplighter was established at Ubon Royal Thai Air Force Base, Thailand. After the move to Ubon, the mission became a four-engined FAC mission with the C-130 crew searching for targets and then calling in strike aircraft. Another little-known C-130 mission flown by Naha-based crews was Operation Commando Scarf (or Operation Commando Lava), which involved the delivery of chemicals onto sections of the Ho Chi Minh Trail in Laos that were designed to produce mud and landslides in hopes of making the truck routes impassable.

In November 1964, on the other side of the globe, C-130Es from the 464th Troop Carrier Wing but lent to 322d Air Division in France, took part in Operation Dragon Rouge, one of the most dramatic missions in history in the former Belgian Congo. After communist Simba rebels took white residents of the city of Stanleyville hostage, the U.S. and Belgium developed a joint rescue mission that used the C-130s to drop, airland, and airlift a force of Belgian paratroopers to rescue the hostages. Two missions were flown, one over Stanleyville and another over Paulis during Thanksgiving week. The headline-making mission resulted in the first award of the prestigious MacKay Trophy to C-130 crews.

In the Indo-Pakistani War of 1965, the No. 6 Transport Squadron of the Pakistan Air Force modified its C-130Bs for use as bombers to carry up to 20,000 pounds (9,100 kg) of bombs on pallets. These improvised bombers were used to hit Indian targets such as bridges, heavy-artillery positions, tank formations, and troop concentrations, though they were largely unsuccessful.

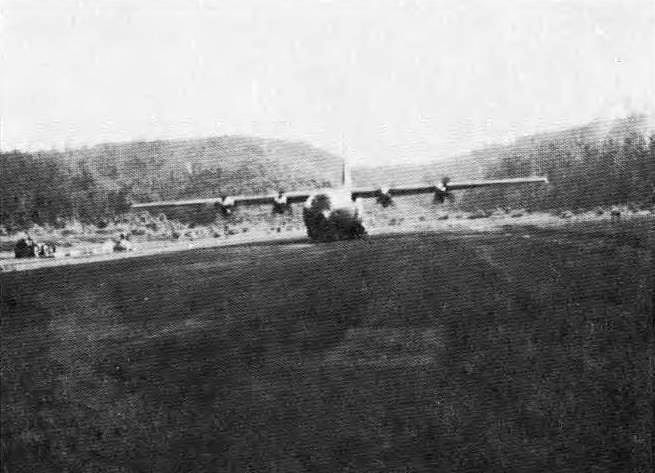
C-130 Hercules were used in the Battle of Kham Duc in 1968, when the North Vietnamese Army forced U.S.-led forces to abandon the Kham Duc Special Forces Camp.

In October 1968, C-130Bs from the 463rd Tactical Airlift Wing dropped a pair of M-121 10,000 pounds (4,500 kg) bombs that had been developed for the massive Convair B-36 Peacemaker bomber, but had never been used. The U.S. Army and USAF resurrected the huge weapons as a means of clearing landing zones (LZs) for helicopters, and in early 1969, the 463rd commenced Commando Vault missions. Although the stated purpose of Commando Vault was to clear LZs, they were also used on enemy base camps and other targets.

During the late 1960s, the U.S. was eager to get information on Chinese nuclear capabilities. After the failure of the Black Cat Squadron to plant operating sensor pods near the Lop Nur Nuclear Weapons Test Base using a U-2, the CIA developed a plan, named Heavy Tea, to deploy two battery-powered sensor pallets near the base. To deploy the pallets, a Black Bat Squadron crew was trained in the U.S. to fly the C-130 Hercules. The crew of 12, led by Col Sun Pei Zhen, took off from Takhli Royal Thai Air Force Base in an unmarked USAF C-130E on 17 May 1969. Flying for 6-1/2 hours at low altitude in the dark, they arrived over the target, and the sensor pallets were dropped by parachute near Anxi in Gansu Province. After another 6-1/2 hours of low-altitude flight, they arrived back at Takhli. The sensors worked and uploaded data to a U.S. intelligence satellite for six months before their batteries failed. The Chinese conducted two nuclear tests, on 22 and 29 September 1969, during the operating life of the sensor pallets. Another mission to the area was planned as Operation Golden Whip, but it was called off in 1970. The aircraft used on this mission most likely was either C-130E serial number 64-0506 or 64-0507 (cn 382-3990 and 382–3991). These two aircraft were delivered to Air America in 1964. After being returned to the USAF sometime between 1966 and 1970, they were assigned the serial numbers of C-130s that had been destroyed in accidents: 64-0506 is now flying as 62–1843, a C-130E that crashed in Vietnam on 20 December 1965, and 64-0507 is now flying as 63–7785, a C-130E that had crashed in Vietnam on 17 June 1966.

The A-model continued in service through the Vietnam War, where the aircraft assigned to the four squadrons at Naha AB, Okinawa, and one at Tachikawa Air Base, Japan, performed yeoman's service, including operating highly classified special-operations missions such as the BLIND BAT FAC/Flare mission and Fact Sheet leaflet mission over Laos and North Vietnam. The A-model was also provided to the Republic of Vietnam Air Force as part of the Vietnamization program at the end of the war and equipped three squadrons based at Tan Son Nhut Air Base. The last operator in the world is the Honduran Air Force, which is still flying one of five A model Hercules (FAH 558, c/n 3042) as of October 2009. As the Vietnam War wound down, the 463rd Troop Carrier/Tactical Airlift Wing B-models and A-models of the 374th Tactical Airlift Wing were transferred back to the United States, where most were assigned to Air Force Reserve and Air National Guard units.

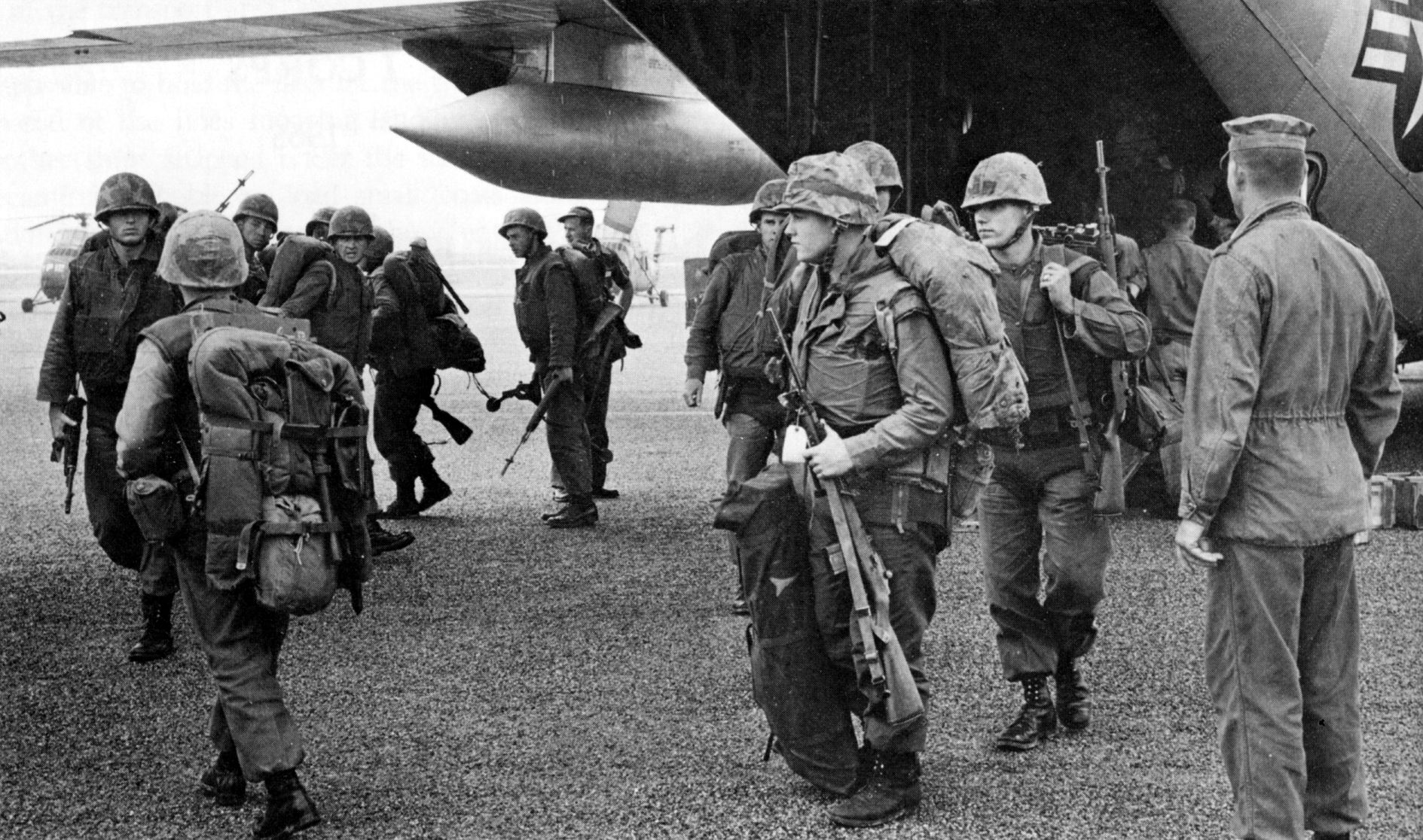
U.S. Marines disembarking from C-130 transports at Da Nang Air Base on 8 March 1965

Another prominent role for the B model was with the USMC, where Hercules initially designated as GV-1s replaced C-119s. After USAF C-130Ds proved the type's usefulness in Antarctica, the US Navy purchased several B-models equipped with skis that were designated as LC-130s. C-130B-II electronic reconnaissance aircraft were operated under the SUN VALLEY program name primarily from Yokota Air Base, Japan. All reverted to standard C-130B cargo aircraft after their replacement in the reconnaissance role by other aircraft.

The C-130 was also used in the 1976 Entebbe raid in which Israeli commando forces performed a surprise operation to rescue 103 passengers of an airliner hijacked by Palestinian and German terrorists at Entebbe Airport, Uganda. The rescue force—200 soldiers, jeeps, and a black Mercedes-Benz (intended to resemble Ugandan Dictator Idi Amin's vehicle of state)—was flown over 2,200 nmi (4,074 km; 2,532 mi) almost entirely at an altitude less than 100 ft (30 m) from Israel to Entebbe by four Israeli Air Force Hercules aircraft without midair refueling (on the way back, the aircraft refueled in Nairobi, Kenya).

During the Falklands War (Spanish: Guerra de las Malvinas) of 1982, Argentine Air Force C-130s undertook dangerous resupply night flights as blockade runners to the Argentine garrison on the Falkland Islands. They also performed daylight maritime survey flights. One was shot down by a Royal Navy Sea Harrier using AIM-9 Sidewinders and cannon. The crew of seven was killed. Argentina also operated two KC-130 tankers during the war, and these refueled both the Douglas A-4 Skyhawks and Navy Dassault-Breguet Super Étendards; some C-130s were modified to operate as bombers with bomb racks under their wings, and attack VLCC Hercules, which ended severely damaged and sunk near Florianópolis, Brasil. The British also used RAF C-130s to support their logistical operations.

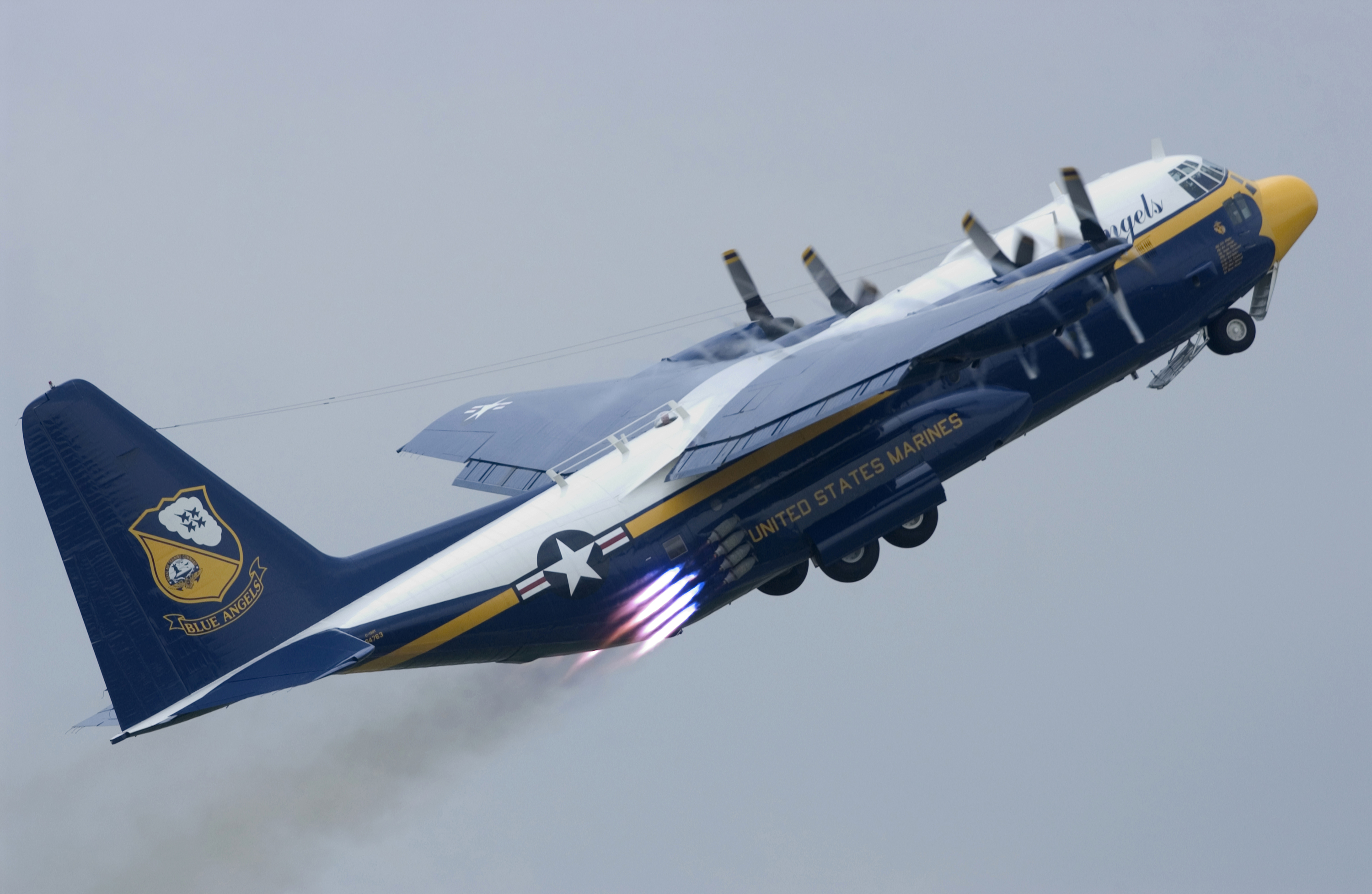
USMC C-130T Fat Albert performing a rocket-assisted takeoff

During the Gulf War of 1991 (Operation Desert Storm), the C-130 Hercules was used operationally by the USAF, US Navy, and USMC, along with the air forces of Australia, New Zealand, Saudi Arabia, South Korea, and the UK. The MC-130 Combat Talon variant delivered the first BLU-82 "Daisy Cutter" bombs during Desert Storm in 1991, used primarily to clear landing zones and eliminate mine fields. The successor weapon, the GBU-43/B Massive Ordnance Air Blast, was developed in 2003 and first used operationally from an MC-130 in Afghanistan in April 2017.

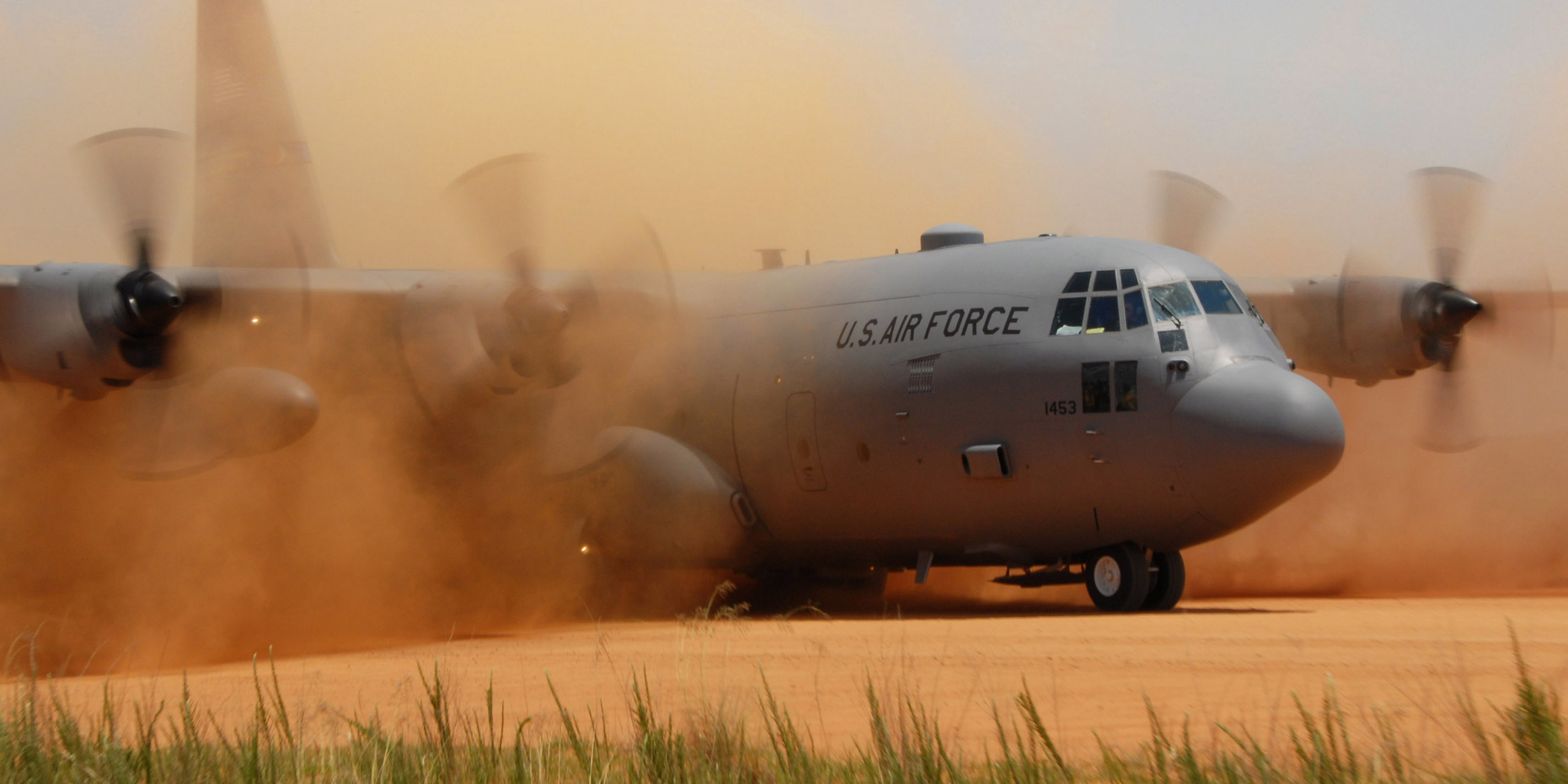
A C-130 Hercules performs a tactical landing on a dirt strip, North Carolina, U.S.

Since 1992, two successive C-130 aircraft named Fat Albert have served as the support aircraft for the US Navy Blue Angels flight demonstration team. Fat Albert I was a TC-130G (151891) a former Navy TACAMO aircraft serving with Fleet Air Reconnaissance Squadron Three (VQ-3) before being transferred to the Blue Angels, while Fat Albert II is a C-130T (164763). Although Fat Albert supports a Navy squadron, it is operated by the USMC and its crew consists solely of USMC personnel. At some air shows featuring the team, Fat Albert takes part, performing flyovers. Until 2009, it also demonstrated its rocket-assisted takeoff capabilities; these ended due to dwindling supplies of rockets.

The AC-130 also holds the record for the longest sustained flight by a C-130. From 22 to 24 October 1997, two AC-130U gunships flew 36 hours nonstop from Hurlburt Field, Florida, to Daegu International Airport, South Korea, being refueled seven times by KC-135 tanker aircraft. This record flight beat the previous record longest flight by over 10 hours, and the two gunships took on 410,000 lb (190,000 kg) of fuel. The gunship has been used in every major U.S. combat operation since Vietnam, except for Operation El Dorado Canyon, the 1986 attack on Libya.

During the invasion of Afghanistan in 2001 and the ongoing support of the International Security Assistance Force (Operation Enduring Freedom), the C-130 Hercules has been used operationally by Australia, Belgium, Canada, Denmark, France, Italy, the Netherlands, New Zealand, Norway, Portugal, Romania, South Korea, Spain, the UK, and the United States.

During the 2003 invasion of Iraq (Operation Iraqi Freedom), the C-130 Hercules was used operationally by Australia, the UK, and the United States. After the initial invasion, C-130 operators as part of the multinational force in Iraq used their C-130s to support their forces in Iraq.

Since 2004, the Pakistan Air Force has employed C-130s in the War in North-West Pakistan. Some variants had forward-looking infrared (FLIR Systems Star Safire III EO/IR) sensor balls, to enable close tracking of militants.

In 2017, France and Germany announced that they would build up a joint air transport squadron at Evreux Air Base, France, comprising 10 C-130J aircraft. Six of these will be operated by Germany. Initial operational capability is expected for 2021, while full operational capability was scheduled for 2024.

The Argentine Air Force has five C-130H aircraft that are part of a US-funded security assistance donation. The US has been leasing the aircraft to the Argentine Air Force through the Georgia Air National Guard since June 2023.

In November 2026, an Irish peace activist, Daithí Ó Corráin, was charged with destroying a U.S. Military C-130H aircraft at Shannon Airport earlier that year. He is alleged to have destroyed every gauge in the aircraft, cutting wires and hydraulic lines, puncturing the air ducts, and pouring gallium and ball bearings into the fuel tanks. The aircraft was valued at approximately $60 million and the damage was deemed to be irreperable.

=== Deepwater Horizon oil spill ===
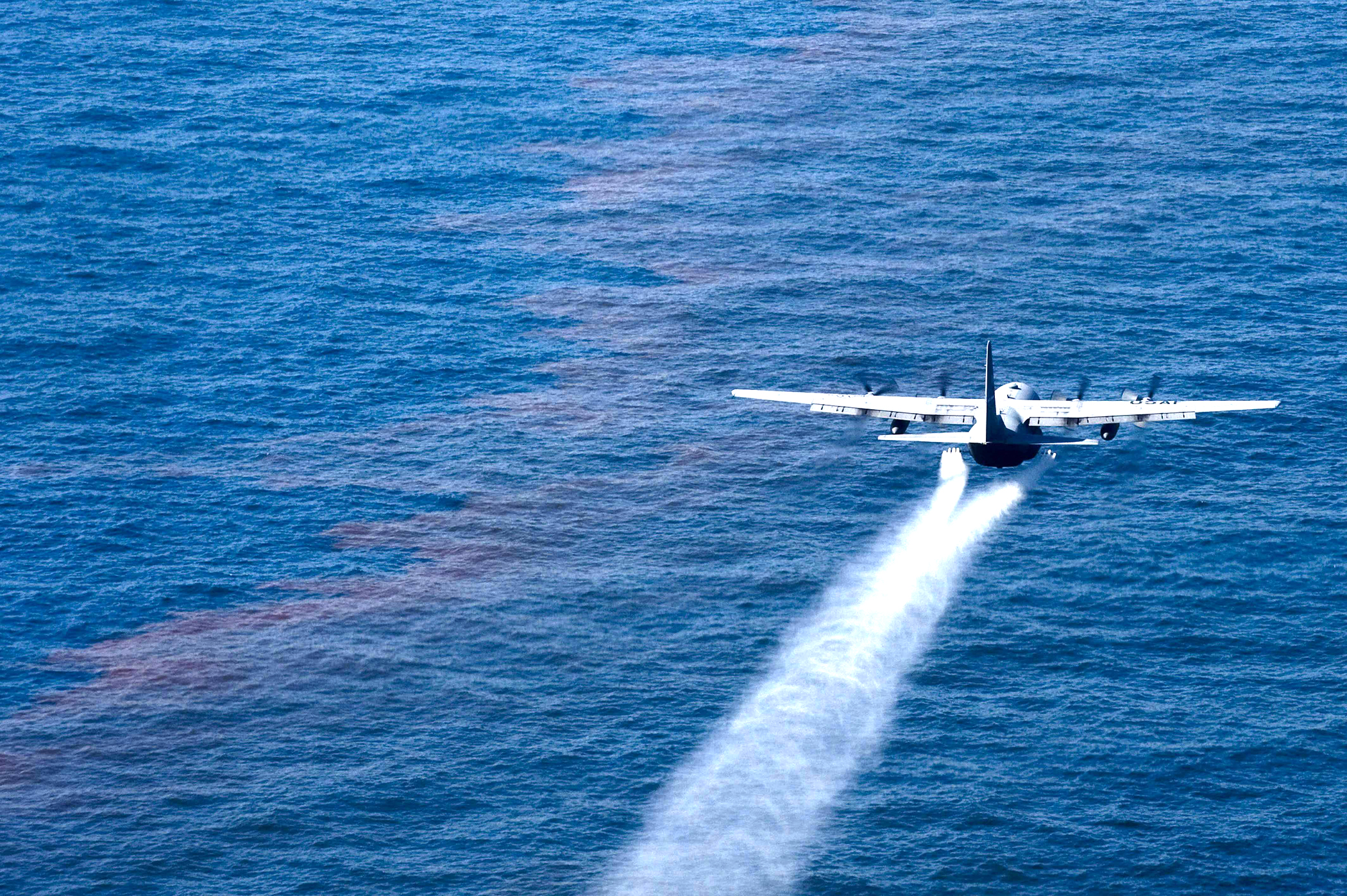
A USAF C-130 Hercules aircraft from the 910th Airlift Wing, Youngstown-Warren Air Reserve Station, Ohio, drops oil-dispersing chemicals into the Gulf of Mexico, 9 May 2010.

For almost two decades, the USAF 910th Airlift Wing's 757th Airlift Squadron and the USCG have participated in oil-spill cleanup exercises to ensure the U.S. military has a capable response in the event of a national emergency. The 757th Airlift Squadron operates the DOD's only fixed-wing aerial spray system, which was certified by the EPA to disperse pesticides on DOD property, to spread oil dispersants onto the Deepwater Horizon oil spill in the Gulf in 2010.

During the 5-week mission, the aircrews flew 92 sorties and sprayed about 30,000 acres with nearly 149,000 gallons of oil dispersant to break up the oil. The Deepwater Horizon mission was the first time the US used the oil-dispersing capability of the 910th Airlift Wing—its only large-area, fixed-wing, aerial-spray program—in an actual spill of national significance. The Air Force Reserve Command announced the 910th Airlift Wing has been selected as a recipient of the Air Force Outstanding Unit Award for its outstanding achievement from 28 April 2010 through 4 June 2010.

=== Hurricane Harvey ===
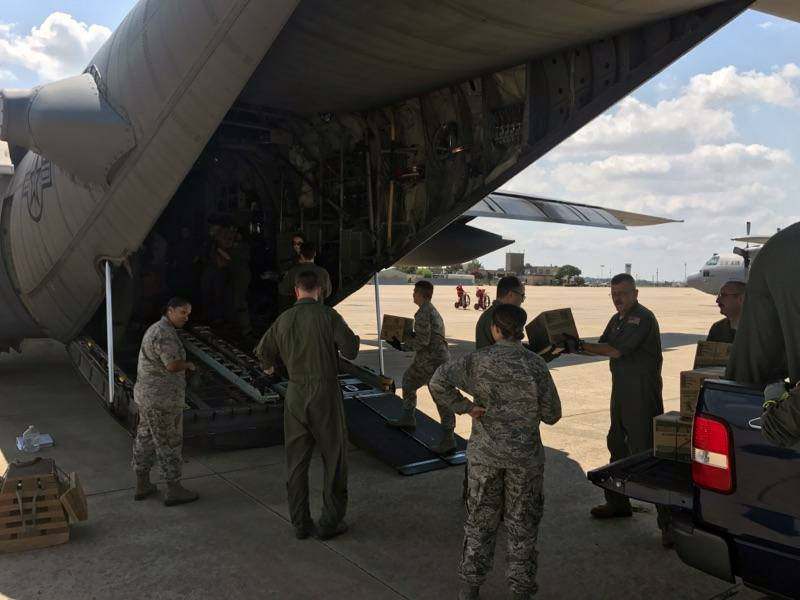
Illinois Air National Guard crews assisting with Hurricane Harvey relief are loading supplies aboard a C-130.

C-130s temporarily based at Kelly Field conducted mosquito control aerial-spray applications over areas of eastern Texas devastated by Hurricane Harvey. This special mission treated more than 2.3 million acres at the direction of Federal Emergency Management Agency and the Texas Department of State Health Services to assist in recovery efforts by helping contain the significant increase in pest insects caused by large amounts of standing, stagnant water. The 910th Airlift Wing operates the Department of Defense's only aerial-spray capability to control pest insect populations, eliminate undesired and invasive vegetation, and disperse oil spills in large bodies of water.

The aerial-spray flight also is now able to operate at night with night-vision devices, which increases the flight's best-case spray capacity from around 60,000 acres per day to 190,000 acres per day. Spray missions are normally conducted at dusk and night when pest insects are most active, the U.S. Air Force Reserve reports.

=== Aerial firefighting ===
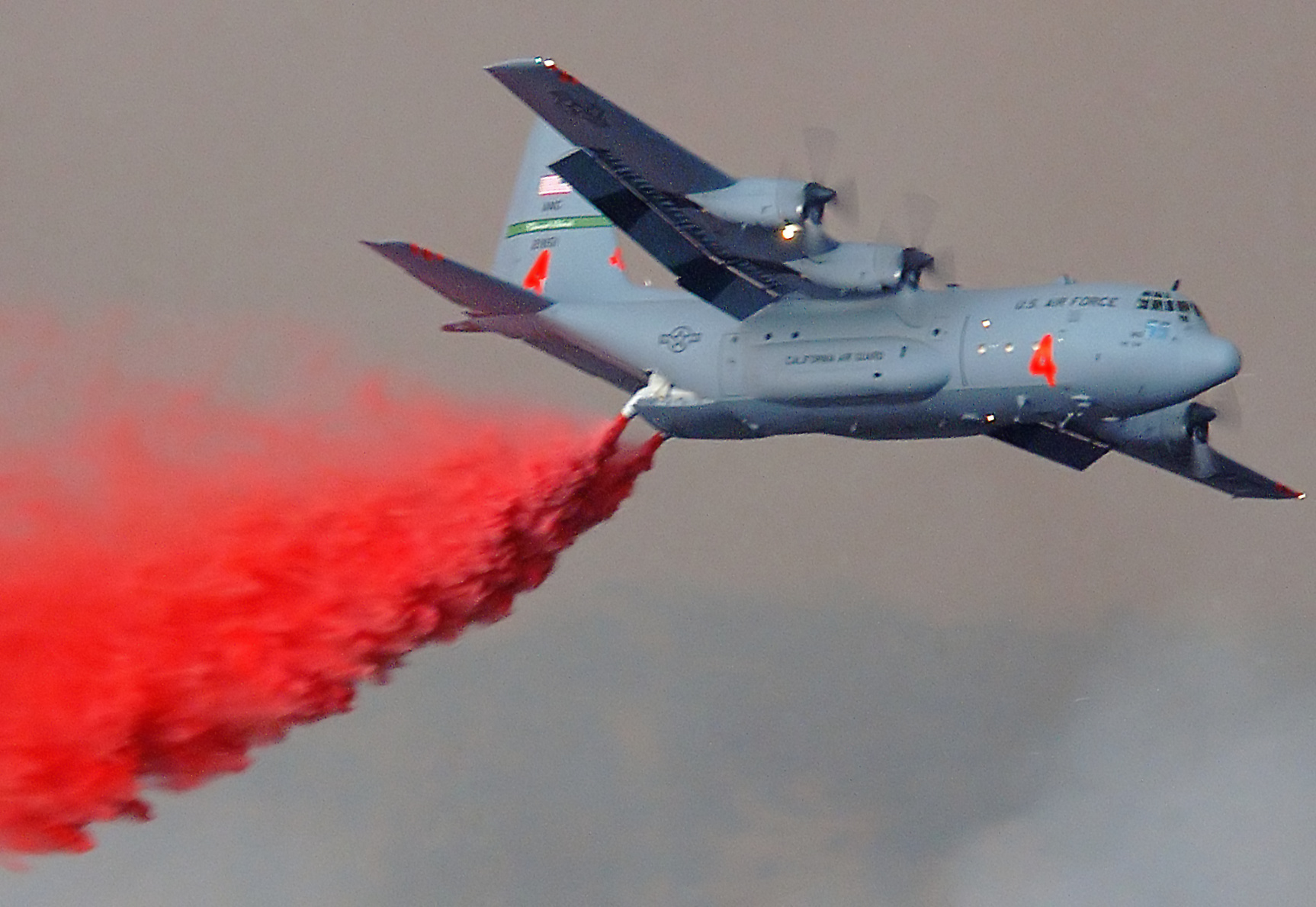
A C-130E fitted is with a MAFFS-1 dropping fire retardant.

In the early 1970s, Congress authorized the Modular Airborne Firefighting System, a joint operation between the U.S. Forest Service and the Department of Defense. This roll-on/roll-off device allows C-130s to be temporarily converted into a 3,000-gallon airtanker for fighting wildfires when demand exceeds the supply of privately contracted and publicly available airtankers.

In the late 1980s, 22 retired USAF C-130As were removed from storage and transferred to the U.S. Forest Service, which then transferred them to six private companies to be converted into airtankers. One of these C-130s crashed in June 2002 while operating near Walker, California. The crash was attributed to wing separation caused by fatigue stress-cracking and contributed to the grounding of the entire large aircraft fleet. After an extensive review, the Forest Service and the Bureau of Land Management declined to renew the leases on nine C-130A over concerns about the age of the aircraft, which had been in service since the 1950s, and their ability to handle the forces generated by aerial firefighting.

More recently, an updated retardant aerial delivery system known as RADS XL was developed by Coulson Aviation USA. That system consists of a C-130H/Q retrofitted with an in-floor discharge system, combined with a removable 3,500- or 4,000-gallon water tank. The combined system is FAA certified. On 23 January 2020, Coulson's Tanker 134, an EC-130Q registered as N134CG, crashed during aerial firefighting operations in New South Wales, Australia, killing all three crew members. The aircraft had taken off from RAAF Base Richmond and was supporting firefighting operations during Australia's 2019–20 fire season.

== Variants ==
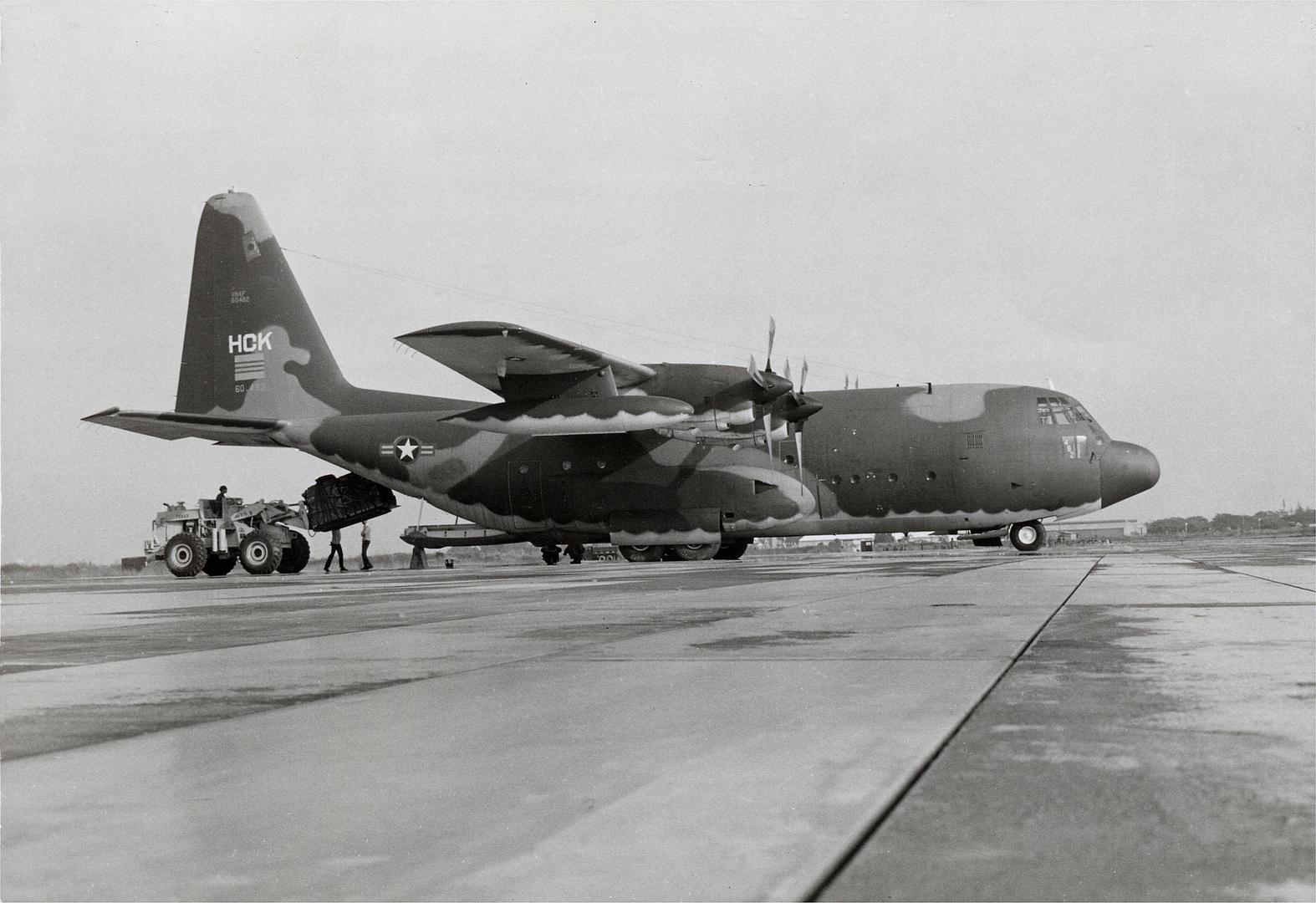
C-130A of the South Vietnam Air Force

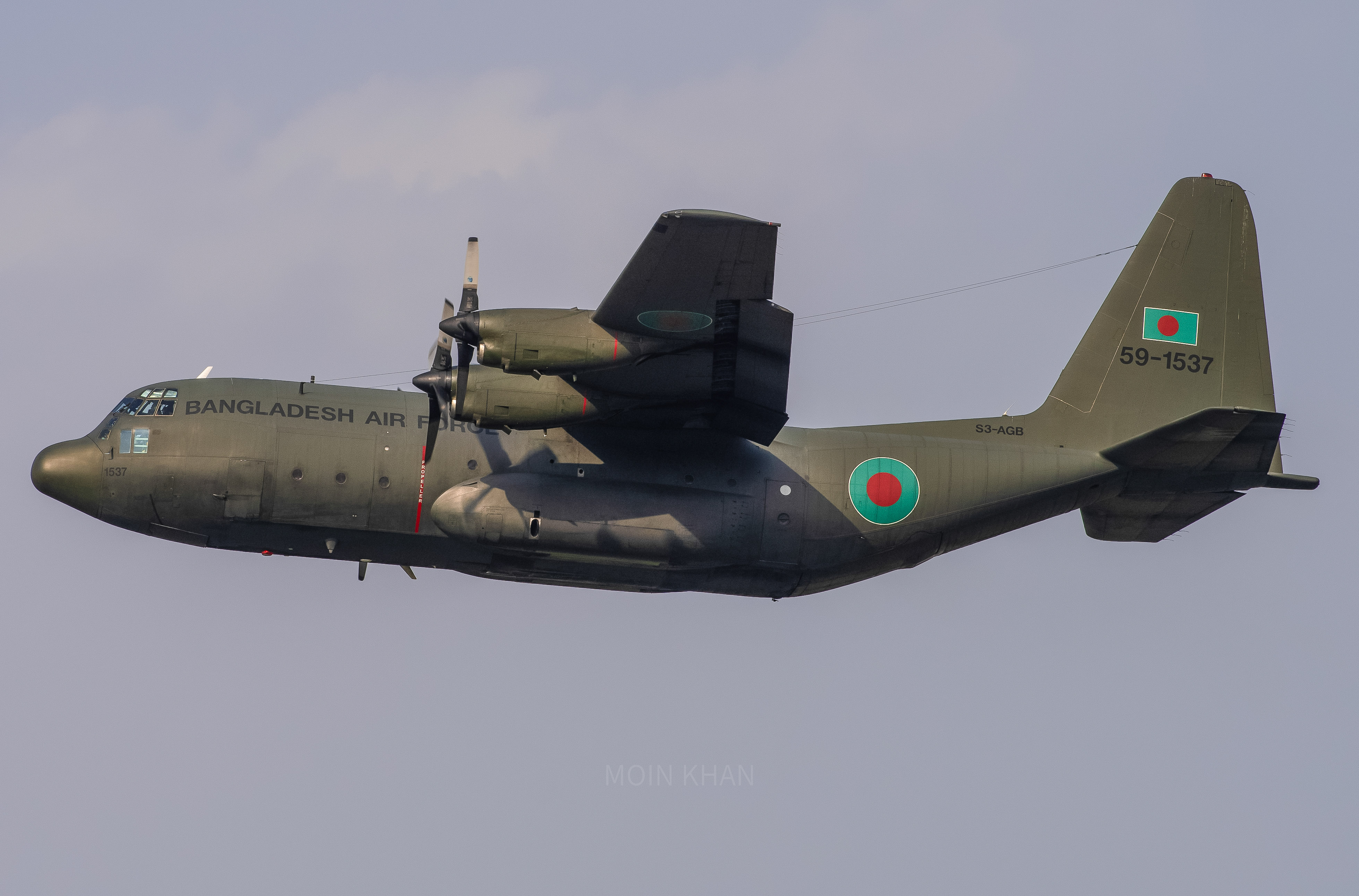
A Bangladesh Air Force C-130B. One of the last C-130Bs and among the oldest in active military service

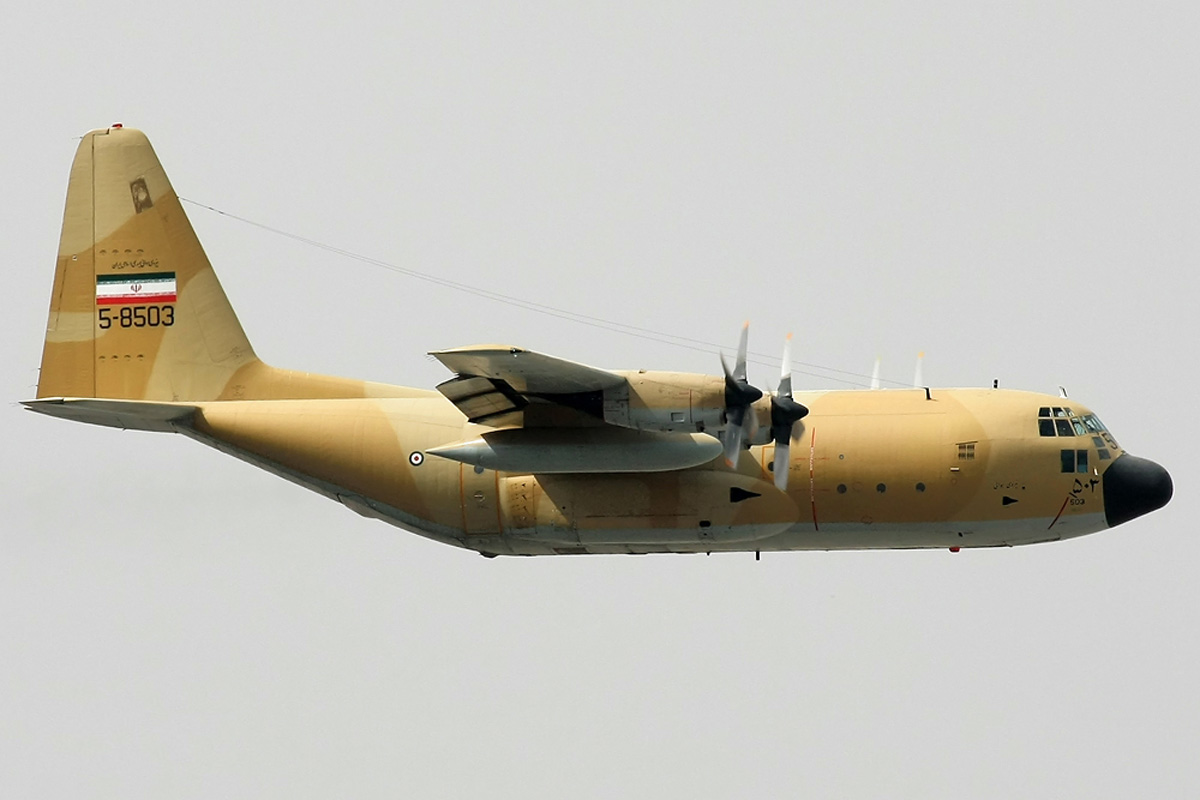
C-130E of the Islamic Republic of Iran Air Force

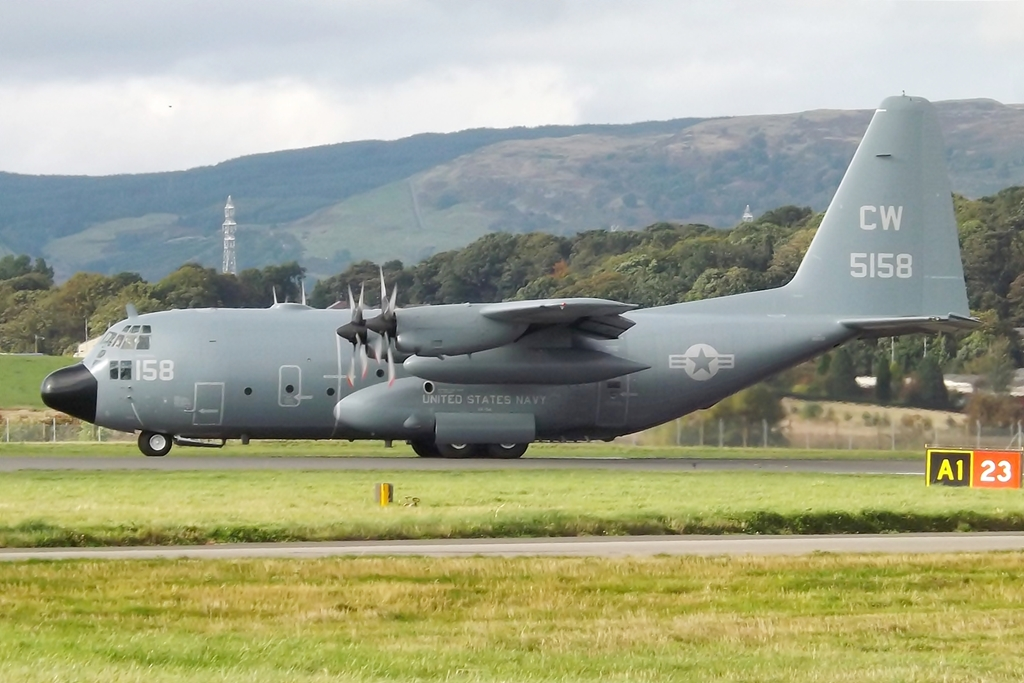
United States Navy C-130T, 2013

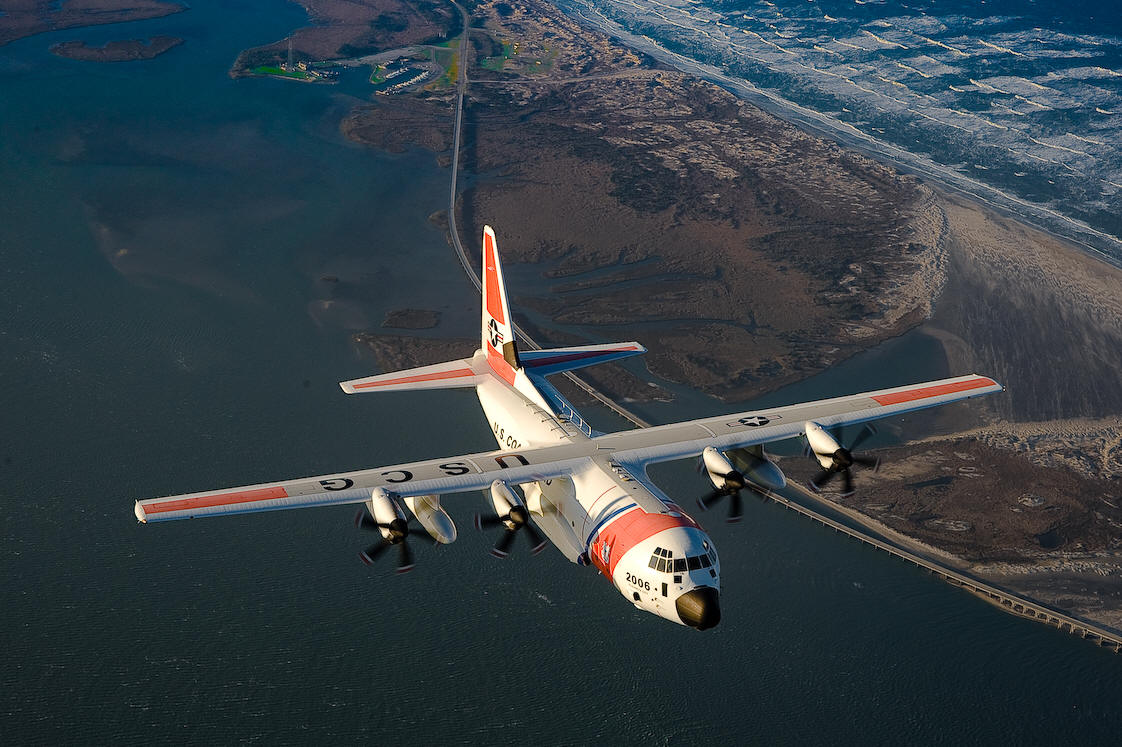
A United States Coast Guard HC-130J

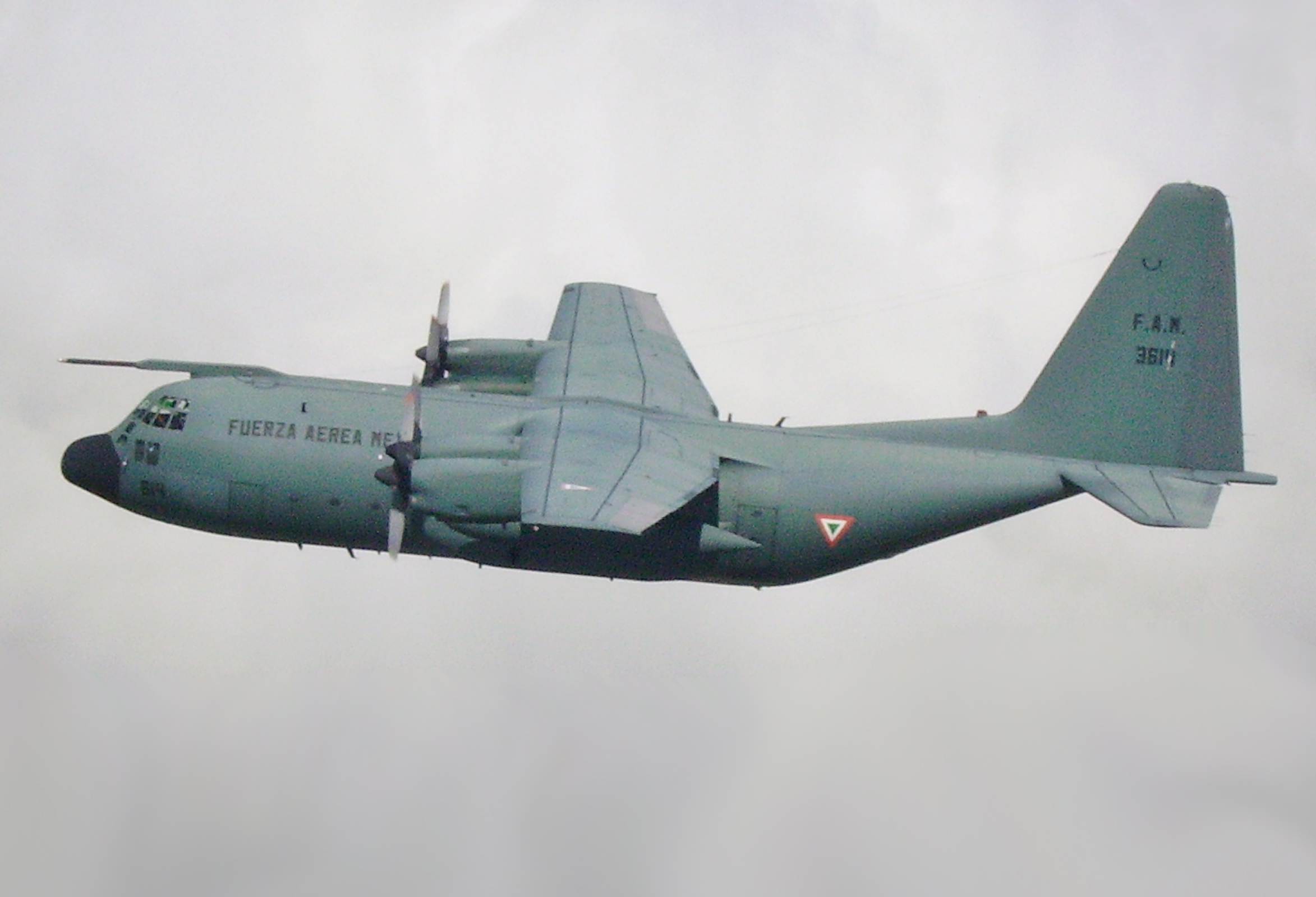
A Mexican Air Force C-130K

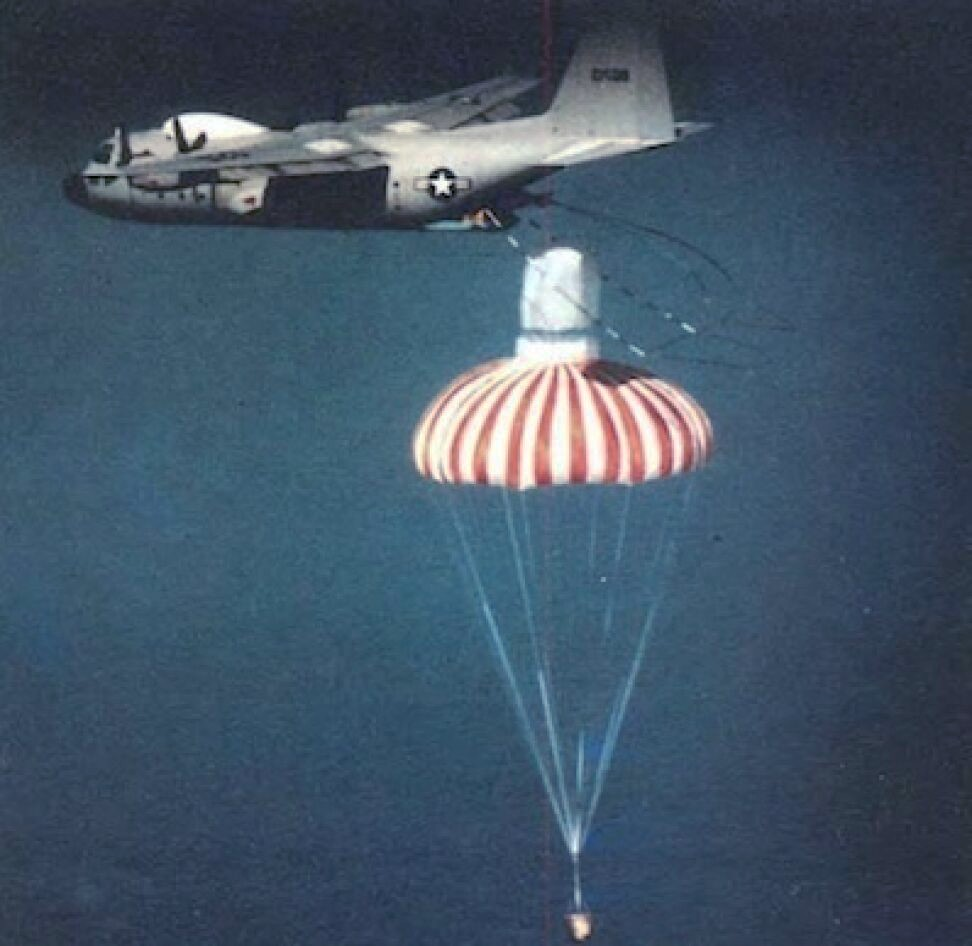
A U.S. JC-130 aircraft retrieving a reconnaissance satellite film capsule under parachute.

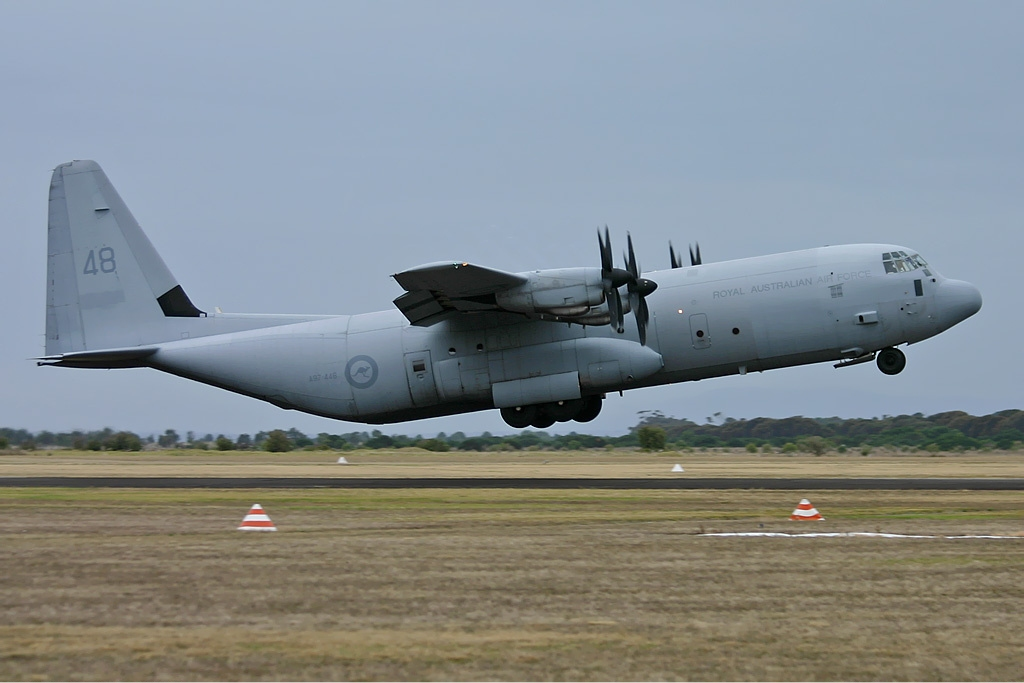
RAAF C-130J-30 at Point Cook, 2006

Significant military variants of the C-130 include:

C-130A
Initial production model with four Allison T56-A-11/9 turboprop engines. 219 were ordered and deliveries to the USAF began in December 1956.
C-130B
Variant with four Allison T56-A-7 engines. 134 were ordered and entered USAF service in May 1959.
C-130E
Same engines as the C-130B but with two 1,290 U.S. gal (4,900 L; 1,070 imp gal) external fuel tanks, and an increased maximum takeoff weight capability. Introduced in August 1962 with 389 were ordered.
C-130F/G
Variants procured by the U.S. Navy for Marine Corps refueling missions, and other support/transport operations.
C-130H
Identical to the C-130E but with more powerful Allison T56-A-15 turboprop engines. Introduced in June 1964 with 308 ordered.
C-130K
Designation for RAF Hercules C1/W2/C3 aircraft (C-130Js in RAF service are the Hercules C.4 and Hercules C.5)
C-130T
Improved variants procured by the U.S. Navy for Marine Corps for refueling and other support/transport operations.
C-130A-II Dreamboat
Early version Electronic Intelligence/Signals Intelligence (ELINT/SIGINT) aircraft
C-130J Super Hercules
Tactical airlifter, with new engines, avionics, and updated systems
C-130B BLC
A one-off conversion of C-130B 58–0712, modified with a double Allison YT56 gas generator pod under each outer wing, to provide bleed air for all the control surfaces and flaps.
AC-130A/E/H/J/U/W
Gunship variants
C-130D/D-6
Ski-equipped version for snow and ice operations United States Air Force / Air National Guard
CC-130E/H/J Hercules
Designation for Canadian Armed Forces / Royal Canadian Air Force Hercules aircraft. U.S. Air Force used the CC-130J designation to differentiate the standard C-130J variant from the "stretched" C-130J (company designation C-130J-30). CC-130H(T) is the Canadian tanker variant of the KC-130H.
C-130M
Designation used by the Brazilian Air Force for locally modified C-130H aircraft.
DC-130A/E/H
USAF and USN Drone control
E-130J
Future USN TACAMO aircraft
EC-130
EC-130E/J Commando Solo – USAF / Air National Guard psychological operations version
EC-130E Airborne Battlefield Command and Control Center (ABCCC) – USAF procedural air-to-ground attack control, also provided NRT threat updates
EC-130E Rivet Rider – Airborne psychological warfare aircraft
EC-130H Compass Call – Electronic warfare and electronic attack.
EC-130Q – USN TACAMO aircraft
EC-130V – Airborne early warning and control (AEW&C) variant used by USCG for counter-narcotics missions
GC-130
Permanently grounded instructional airframes
HC-130
HC-130B/E/H – Early model combat search and rescue
HC-130P/N Combat King – USAF aerial refueling tanker and combat search and rescue
HC-130J Combat King II – Next generation combat search and rescue tanker
HC-130H/J – USCG long-range surveillance and search and rescue, USAFR Aerial Spray & Airlift
JC-130
Temporary conversion for flight test operations; often refers to aircraft fitted with mid-air retrieval gear for recovery of space capsules and drones.
KC-130F/R/T/J
United States Marine Corps aerial refueling tanker and tactical airlifter
LC-130F/H/R
USAF / Air National Guard – Ski-equipped version for Arctic and Antarctic support operations; LC-130F and R previously operated by USN
MC-130
MC-130E/H Combat Talon I/II – Special operations infiltration/extraction variant
MC-130W Combat Spear/Dragon Spear – Special operations tanker/gunship
MC-130P Combat Shadow – Special operations tanker – all operational aircraft converted to HC-130P standard
MC-130J Commando II (formerly Combat Shadow II) – Special operations tanker Air Force Special Operations Command
YMC-130H – Modified aircraft under Operation Credible Sport for second Iran hostage crisis rescue attempt
NC-130
Permanent conversion for flight test operations
PC-130/C-130-MP
Maritime patrol
RC-130A/S
Surveillance aircraft for reconnaissance
SC-130J Sea Herc
Proposed maritime patrol version of the C-130J, designed for coastal surveillance and anti-submarine warfare.

TC-130
Aircrew training
VC-130H
VIP transport
WC-130A/B/E/H/J
Weather reconnaissance ("Hurricane Hunter") version for USAF / Air Force Reserve Command's 53d Weather Reconnaissance Squadron in support of the National Weather Service's National Hurricane Center
C-130HE
Electronic warfare version of C-130H for Republic of China Air Force.
C-130(EM/BM) Erciyes
Turkey's Erciyes modernization program covers modernization of the avionics of C-130B/E variants of the aircraft. In scope of modernization the aircraft is equipped with Digital Cockpit (four-color Multifunctional Display with moving map capability-MFD), two Central Display Units (CDU) and two multifunction Central Control Computers compatible with international navigational requirements, as well as with a multifunction Mission Computer with high operational capability, Flight Management System (FMS), Link-16, Ground Mission Planning Unit compatible with the Air Force Information System, and display and lighting systems compatible with Night Vision Goggles. Other components such as GPS, indicator, anti-collision system, air radar, advanced military and civilian navigation systems, night-time invisible lighting for military missions, black box voice recorder, communication systems, advanced automated flight systems (military and civilian), systems enabling operation in the military network, digital moving map and ground mission planning systems are also included.

B.L.8
(Thai: บ.ล.๘) Royal Thai Armed Forces designation for the C-130H.
B.L.8A
(Thai: บ.ล.๘ก) Royal Thai Armed Forces designation for the C-130H-30.

TP 84
Swedish Air Force designation for the C-130H

== Operators ==
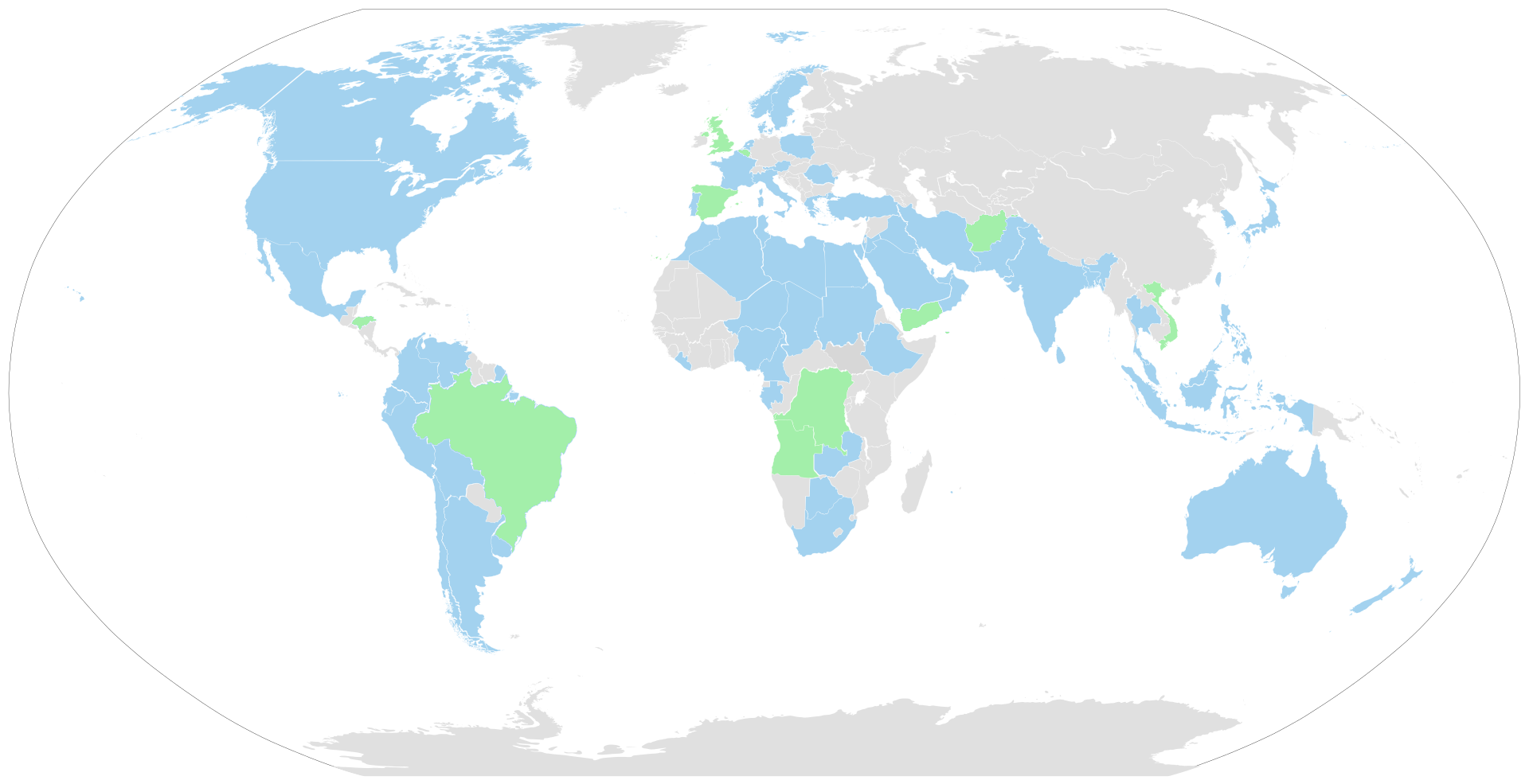
Military operators: Current Former

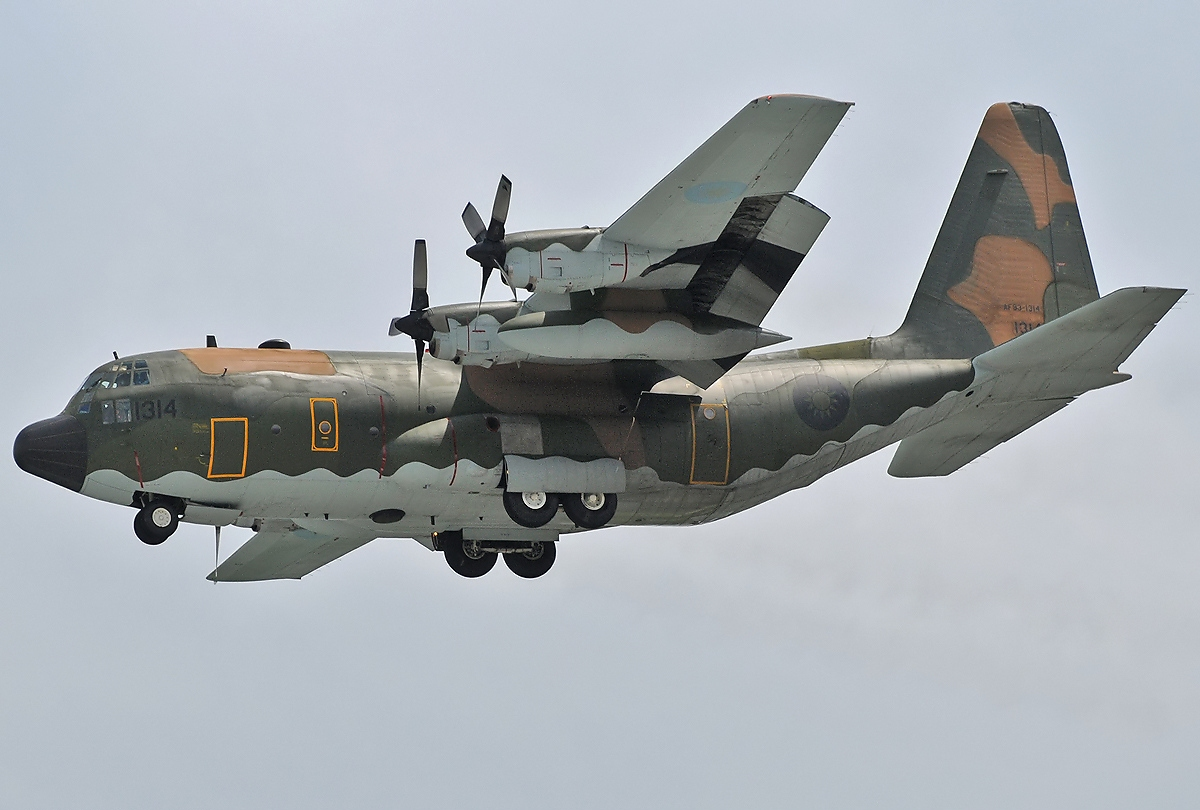
A Republic of China Air Force C-130H, 2011

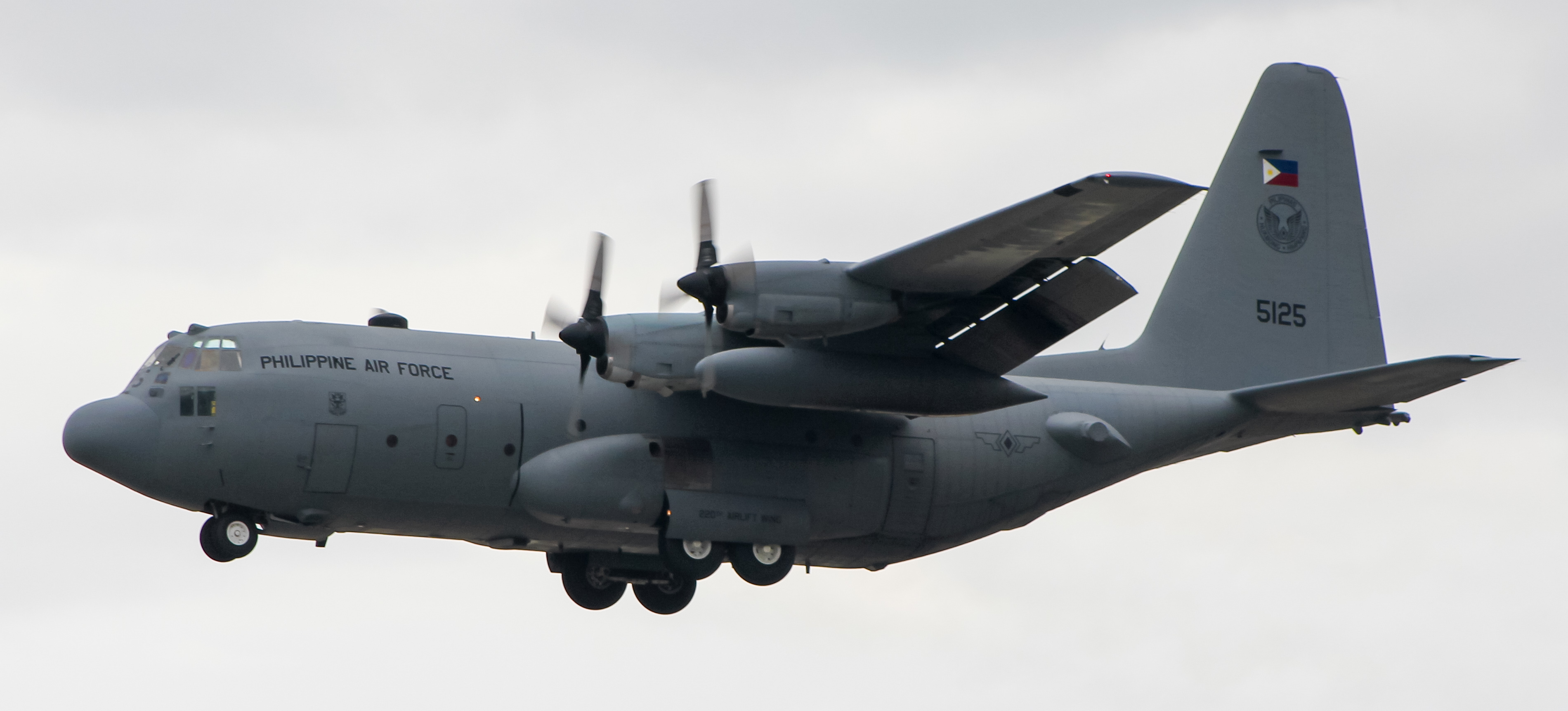
A Philippine Air Force C-130H, 2021

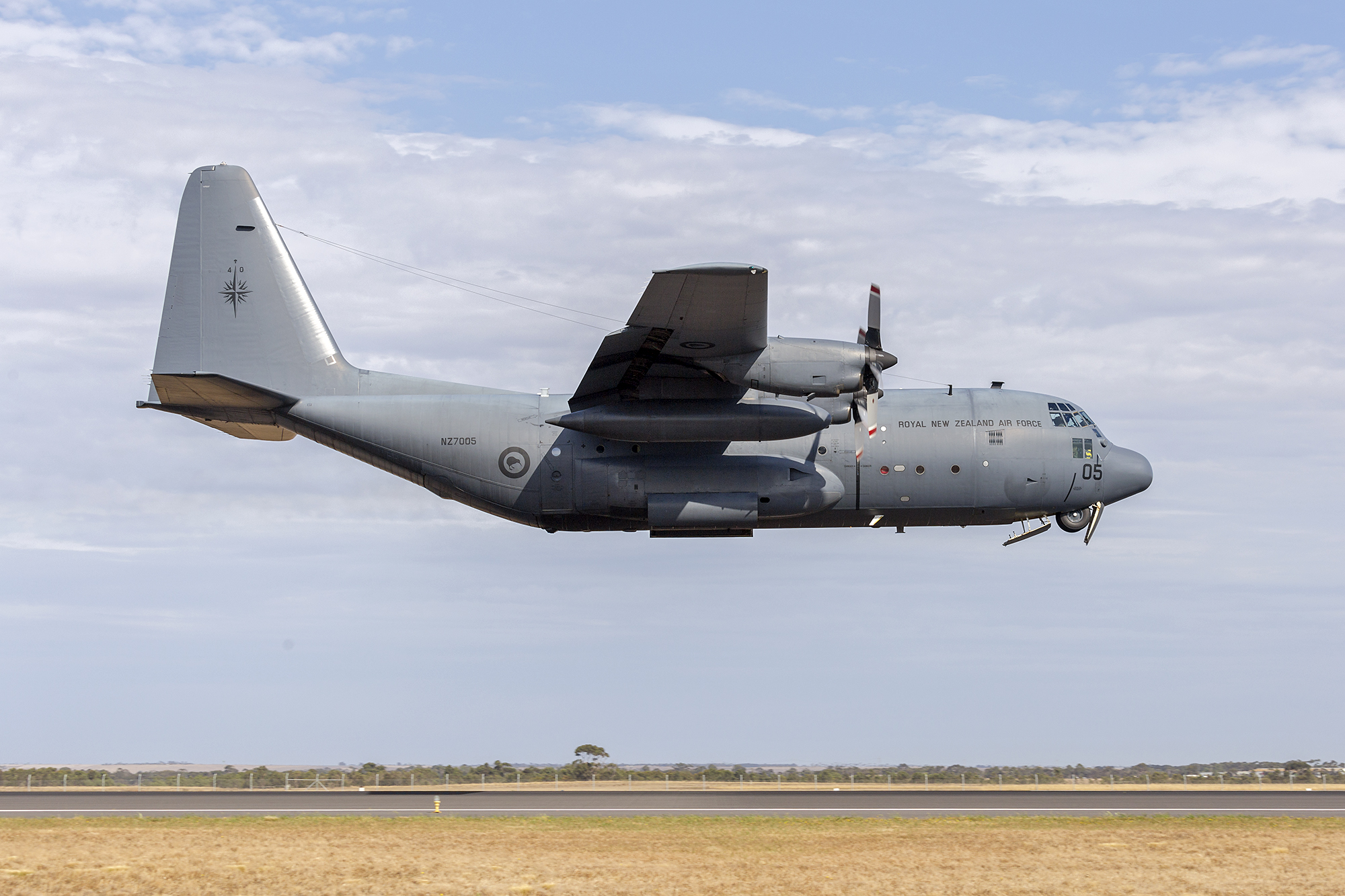
A Royal New Zealand Air Force C-130H, 2019

- Algeria
- Argentina
- Australia
- Austria
- Bangladesh
- Bolivia
- Botswana
- Cameroon
- Canada
- Chad
- Chile
- Colombia
- Denmark
- Ecuador
- Egypt
- Ethiopia
- France
- Gabon
- Germany
- Greece
- India
- Indonesia
- Iran
- Iraq
- Israel
- Italy
- Japan
- Jordan
- Kuwait
- Liberia
- Libya
- Malaysia
- Mexico
- Morocco
- Netherlands
- New Zealand
- Niger
- Nigeria
- Norway
- Oman
- Pakistan
- Peru
- Philippines
- Poland
- Portugal
- Republic of China (Taiwan)
- Romania
- Saudi Arabia
- Singapore
- South Africa
- South Korea
- Sri Lanka
- Sudan
- Sweden
- Thailand
- Tunisia
- Turkey
- United Arab Emirates
- United States
- Uruguay
- Venezuela
- Zambia

Former operators

- Afghanistan
- Angola
- Belgium
- Brazil
- Honduras
- Rhodesia
- South Vietnam
- Spain
- United Kingdom
- Vietnam
- Yemen
- Zaire

== Accidents ==
The C-130 Hercules has had a low accident rate in general. The Royal Air Force recorded an accident rate of about one aircraft loss per 250,000 flying hours over the last 40 years, placing it behind Vickers VC10s and Lockheed TriStars with no flying losses. As of 1989 USAF transports (such as the C-130) had an "attrition" (percent of aircraft destroyed by accident) of 5% as compared to 1–2% for commercial airliners in the U.S., 10% for B-52 bombers, and 20% for fighters (F-4, F-111), trainers (T-37, T-38), and helicopters (H-3).

== Aircraft on display ==
=== Argentina ===
- C-130B FAA TC-60. ex USAF 61-0964 received in February 1992 now at Museo Nacional de Aeronáutica since September 2011.

=== Australia ===
- C-130A RAAF A97-214 used by 36 Squadron from early 1959, withdrawn from use late 1978. Stored at RAAF Museum, RAAF Base Williams, Point Cook. Airframe scrapped in February 2022. Cockpit section preserved and gifted to National Vietnam Veterans Museum, Phillip Island.
- C-130E RAAF A97-160 used by 37 Squadron from August 1966, withdrawn from use November 2000; to RAAF Museum, 14 November 2000, cocooned as of September 2005.
- C-130H A97-011 delivered in October 1978, withdrawn from use December 2012 to RAAF Museum, Point Cook where it is currently on display.

=== Belgium ===
- C-130H Belgian Air Component tailnumber CH13 in service from 2009 until May 2021 is on display at the Beauvechain Air Base at the First Wing Historical Center.

=== Brazil ===
- C-130H Brazilian Air Force FAB-2453 is on display at the Museu Aeroespacial in Rio de Janeiro since 2014.
- Three C-130H Brazilian Air Force FAB2451, FAB2456 and FAB2463 on display at the Gamela Eco Resort Hotel in Cantagalo, Rio de Janeiro.

=== Canada ===
- CC-130E RCAF 10313 (later 130313) is on display at the National Air Force Museum of Canada, CFB Trenton
- CC-130E RCAF 10307 (later 130307) is on display in the Reserve Hangar at the Canada Aviation and Space Museum, Ottawa, Ontario
- CC-130E RCAF 130328 is on display at the Greenwood Military Aviation Museum, CFB Greenwood

=== Colombia ===
- C-130B FAC 1010 (serial number 3521) moved on 14 January 2016 to the Colombian Aerospace Museum in Tocancipá, Cundinamarca, for static display.
- C-130B FAC1011 (serial number 3585, ex 59–1535) preserved at the Colombian Air and Space Museum within CATAM AFB, Bogotá.

=== Indonesia ===
- C-130B Indonesian Air Force A-1301 preserved at Sulaeman Airstrip, Bandung. Also occasionally used for Paskhas Training. The airplane is relocated to Air Force Museum in Yogyakarta in 2017.

=== New Zealand ===
- C-130H(NZ) Royal New Zealand Air Force, aircraft NZ7001 was retired to the Air Force Museum making its final delivery flight into Wigram on 19 February 2025, following 60 years service.

=== Norway ===
- C-130H Royal Norwegian Air Force 953 was retired on 10 June 2007 and moved to the Air Force museum at Oslo Gardermoen in May 2008.

=== Philippines ===
- L-100-20 4512 Philippine Air Force on display at Mactan Air Base aircraft park.

=== Poland ===
- C-130E number 1503 (serial number 70-1272), formerly operated by Polish Air Force and stationed at 33rd Air Base, retired on 30 July 2024. It is currently on display at the Polish Air Force Museum in Dęblin.

=== Saudi Arabia ===
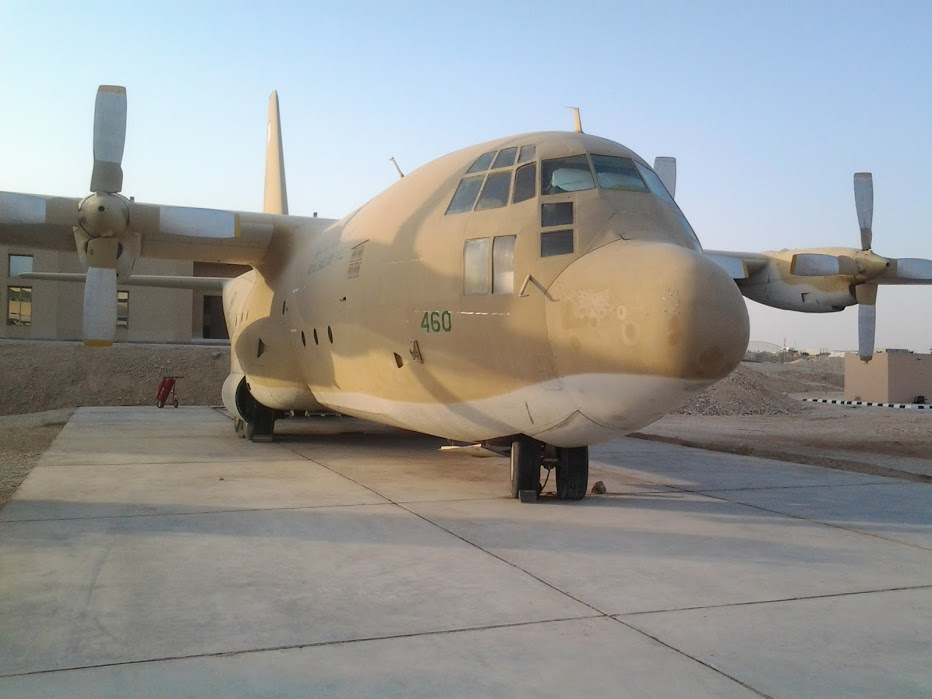
C-130H at the Royal Saudi Air Force Museum

- C-130H RSAF 460 was operated by 4 Squadron Royal Saudi Air Force from December 1974 until January 1987. It was damaged in a fire at Jeddah in December 1989. Restored for ground training by August 1993. At Royal Saudi Air Force Museum, November 2002, restored for ground display by using a tail from another C-130H.

=== United Kingdom ===
- Hercules C3 XV202 that served with the Royal Air Force from 1967 to 2011, is on display at the Royal Air Force Museum Cosford.

=== United States ===
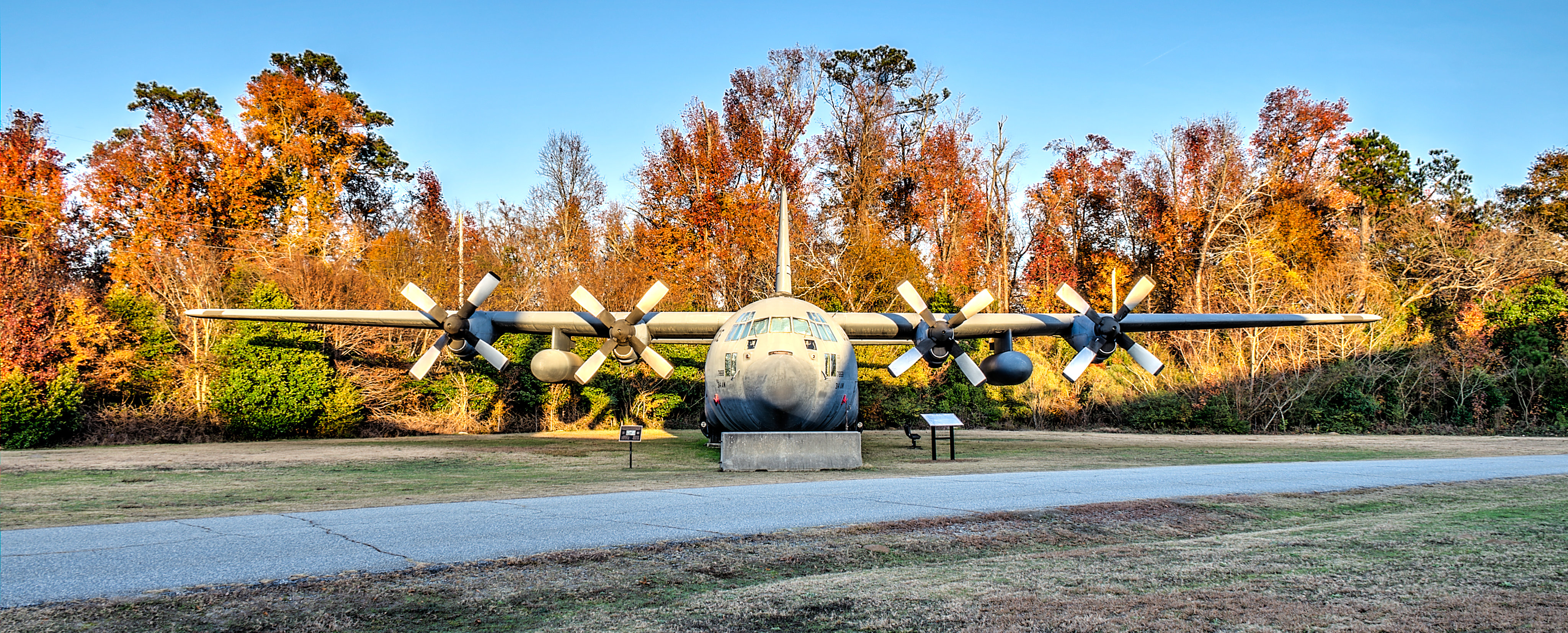
C-130E at the Museum of Aviation

- C-130A, AF Ser. No. 54-1632. Privately owned, stored in Tucson, Arizona near Davis Monthan AFB. It is the 21st aircraft built and the only one left with the early "roman nose".
- GC-130A, AF Ser. No. 55-037 used by the 773 TCS, 483 TCW, 315 AD, 374 TCW, 815 TAS, 35 TAS, 109 TAS, belly-landed at Duluth, Minnesota, April 1973, repaired; 167 TAS, 180 TAS, to Chanute Technical Training Center as GC-130A, May 1984; now displayed at Museum of Missouri Military History, Missouri National Guard Ike Skelton Training Center, Jefferson City, Missouri. Previously displayed at Octave Chanute Aerospace Museum, (former) Chanute AFB, Rantoul, Illinois until museum closed.
- C-130A, AF Ser. No. 56-0518 used by the 314 TCW, 315 AD, 41 ATS, 328 TAS; to Republic of Vietnam Air Force 435 Transport Squadron, November 1972; holds the C-130 record for taking off with the most personnel on board, during the evacuation of SVN, 29 April 1975, with 452. Returned to USAF, 185 TAS, 105 TAS; Flown to Little Rock AFB on 28 June 1989. It was converted to a static display at the LRAFB Visitor Center, Arkansas by Sept. 1989.
- C-130A, AF Ser. No. 57-0453 was operated from 1958 to 1991, last duty with 155th TAS, 164th TAG, Tennessee Air National Guard, Memphis International Airport/ANGB, Tennessee, 1976–1991, named "Nite Train to Memphis"; to AMARC in December 1991, then sent to Texas for modification into a replica of C-130A-II Dreamboat aircraft, AF Ser. No. 56-0528, shot down by Soviet fighters in Soviet airspace near Yerevan, Armenia on 2 September 1958, while on ELINT mission with loss of all crew, displayed in National Vigilance Park, National Security Agency grounds, Fort George Meade, Maryland.
- C-130B, AF Ser. No. 59-0528 was operated by 145th Airlift Wing, North Carolina Air National Guard; placed on static display at Charlotte Air National Guard Base, North Carolina in 2010.
- C-130D, AF Ser. No. 57-0490 used by the 61st TCS, 17th TCS, 139th TAS with skis, July 1975 – April 1983; to MASDC, 1984–1985, GC-130D ground trainer, Chanute AFB, Illinois, 1986–1990; When Chanute AFB closed in September 1993, it moved to the Octave Chanute Aerospace Museum (former Chanute AFB), Rantoul, Illinois. In July 1994, it moved to the Empire State Aerosciences Museum, Schenectady County Airport, New York, until placed on the gate at Stratton Air National Guard Base in October 1994.
- NC-130B, AF Ser. No. 57-0526 was the second B model manufactured, initially delivered as JC-130B; assigned to 6515th Organizational Maintenance Squadron for flight testing at Edwards AFB, California on 29 November 1960; turned over to 6593rd Test Squadron's Operating Location No. 1 at Edwards AFB and spent next seven years supporting Corona Program; "J" status and prefix removed from aircraft in October 1967; transferred to 6593rd Test Squadron at Hickam AFB, Hawaii and modified for mid-air retrieval of satellites; acquired by 6514th Test Squadron at Hill AFB, Utah in Jan. 1987 and used as electronic testbed and cargo transport; aircraft retired January 1994 with 11,000+ flight hours and moved to Hill Aerospace Museum at Hill AFB by January 1994.
- C-130E, AF Ser. No. 62-1787, on display at the National Museum of the United States Air Force, Wright-Patterson AFB, Ohio, was flown to the museum on 18 August 2011. One of the greatest feats of heroism during the Vietnam War involved the C-130E, call sign "Spare 617". (Note: The aircrew of "Spare 617" were: Capt. William Caldwell, pilot; Lt. John Hering, co-pilot; Lt. Richard A. Lentz, navigator; Tech. Sgt. Jon Sanders, flight engineer, loadmasters Tech. Sgt. Charlie Shaub and A1C Dave McAleece) The C-130E attempted to airdrop ammunition to surround South Vietnamese forces at An Loc, Vietnam. Approaching the drop zone, Spare 617 received heavy enemy ground fire that damaged two engines, ruptured a bleed air duct in the cargo compartment, and set the ammunition on fire. Flight engineer TSgt Sanders was killed, and navigator 1st Lt Lentz and co-pilot 1st Lt Hering were both wounded. Despite receiving severe burns from hot air escaping from the damaged air bleed duct, loadmaster TSgt Shaub extinguished a fire in the cargo compartment, and successfully jettisoned the cargo pallets, which exploded in mid-air. Despite losing a third engine on the final approach, pilot Capt Caldwell landed Spare 617 safely. For their actions, Caldwell and Shaub received the Air Force Cross, the U.S. Air Force's second highest award for valor. TSgt Shaub also received the William H. Pitsenbarger Award for Heroism from the Air Force Sergeants Association.
- KC-130F, USN/USMC BuNo 149798 used in tests in October–November 1963 by the U.S. Navy for unarrested landings and unassisted take-offs from the carrier USS Forrestal (CV-59), it remains the record holder for largest aircraft to operate from a carrier flight deck, and carried the name "Look Ma, No Hook" during the tests. Retired to the National Museum of Naval Aviation, NAS Pensacola, Florida in May 2003.
- C-130G, USN/USMC BuNo 151891; modified to EC-130G, 1966, then testbed for EC-130Q TACAMO in 1981, then changed to TC-130G and used by Fleet Air Reconnaissance Squadron Three (VQ-3) for flight proficiency (bounce bird). In early 1991 it was transferred to AMARG Davis-Monthan AFB Tucson, AZ. In May 1991 it was assigned as the U.S. Navy's Blue Angels USMC support aircraft, serving as "Fat Albert Airlines" from 1991 to 2002. Retired to the National Museum of Naval Aviation at NAS Pensacola, Florida in November 2002 where it remains on outside static display reflecting the BLUES colors.
- C-130E, AF Ser. No. 64-0525 was on display at the 82nd Airborne Division War Memorial Museum at Fort Bragg, North Carolina. The aircraft was the last assigned to the 43rd AW at Pope AFB, North Carolina before retirement from the USAF.
- C-130E-LM, AF Ser. No. 64-0533 – Taken in December 1964 by 314th Troop Carrier Wing, Sewart AFB, TN. Last assigned to 37th Airlift Squadron, Rhein-Main AB, Germany. Transferred to Elmendorf AFB for display, May 2004. Marked as 53-2453.
- C-130E, AF Ser. No. 69-6579 operated by the 61st TAS, 314th TAW, 50th AS, 61st AS; at Dyess AFB as maintenance trainer as GC-130E, March 1998; to Dyess AFB Linear Air Park, January 2004.
- MC-130E Combat Talon I, AF Ser. No. 64-0567, unofficially known as "Wild Thing". It transported captured Panamanian dictator Manuel Noriega in 1989 during Operation Just Cause and participated in Operation Eagle Claw, the unsuccessful attempt to rescue U.S. hostages from Iran in 1980. Wild Thing was also the first fixed-wing aircraft to employ night-vision goggles. On display at Hurlburt Field, in Florida.
- C-130E, AF Ser. No. 69-6580 operated by the 61st TAS, 314th TAW, 317th TAW, 314th TAW, 317th TAW, 40th AS, 41st AS, 43rd AW, retired after center wing cracks were detected in April 2002; to the Air Mobility Command Museum, Dover AFB, Delaware on 2 February 2004.
- C-130E, AF Ser. No. 70-1269 was used by the 43rd AW and is on display at the Pope Air Park, Pope AFB, North Carolina as of 2006.
- C-130H, AF Ser. No. 74-1686 used by the 463rd TAW; one of three C-130H airframes modified to YMC-130H for an aborted rescue attempt of Iranian hostages, Operation Credible Sport, with rocket packages blistered onto fuselage in 1980, but these were removed after the mission was canceled. Subsequent duty with the 4950th Test Wing, then donated to the Museum of Aviation at Robins AFB, Georgia, in March 1988.
- C-130H3 AF Ser. No. 93-1458 operated by the North Carolina Air National Guard crashed while fighting the White Draw Fire in Edgemont, SD on 1 July 2012.
- C-130H, AF Ser. No. 88-4401 operated by the Ohio 179th Airlift Wing has been retired and is on display at the MAPS Air Museum in North Canton, Ohio.

== Specifications (C-130H) ==
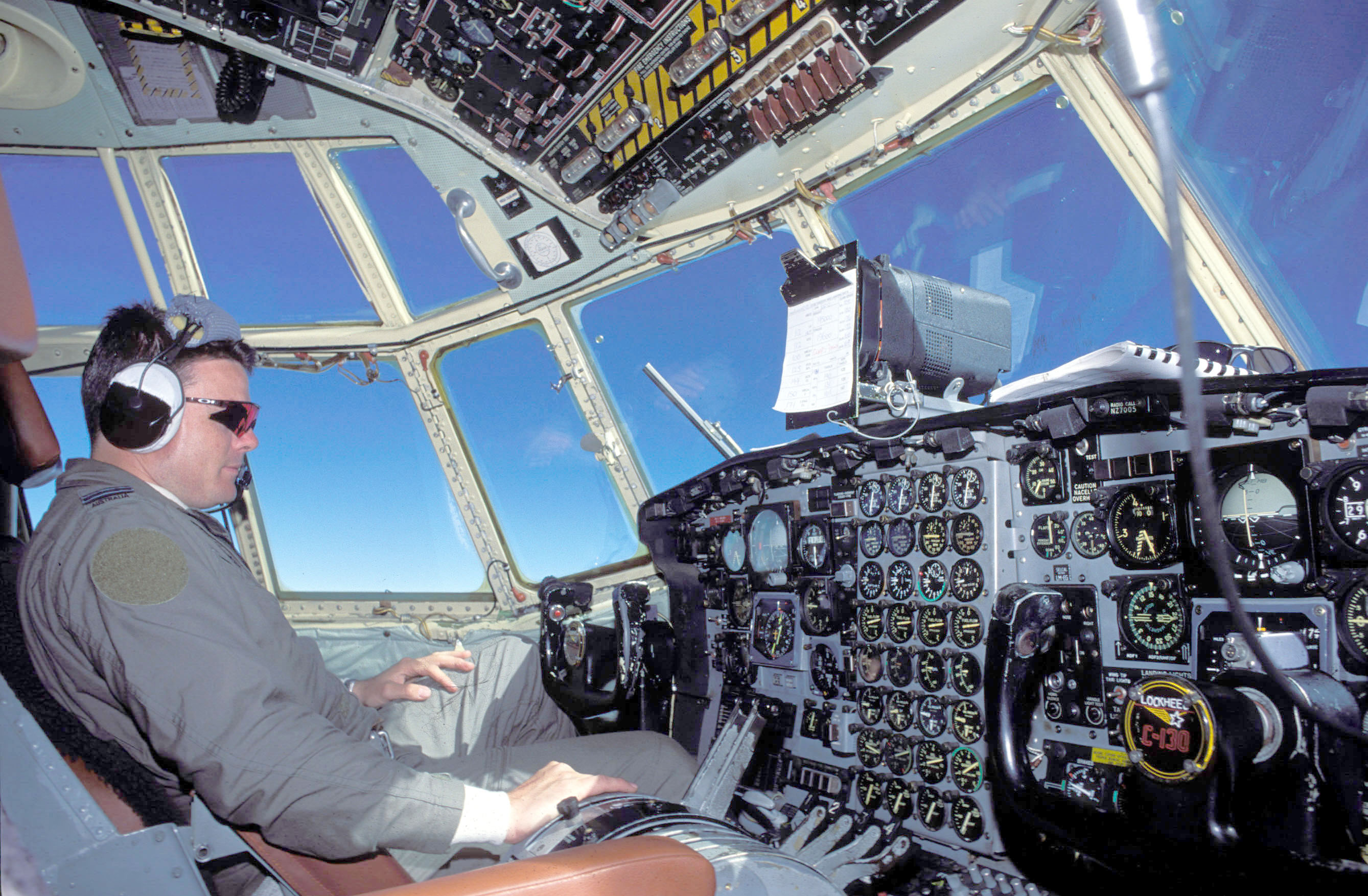
C-130H Hercules flight deck

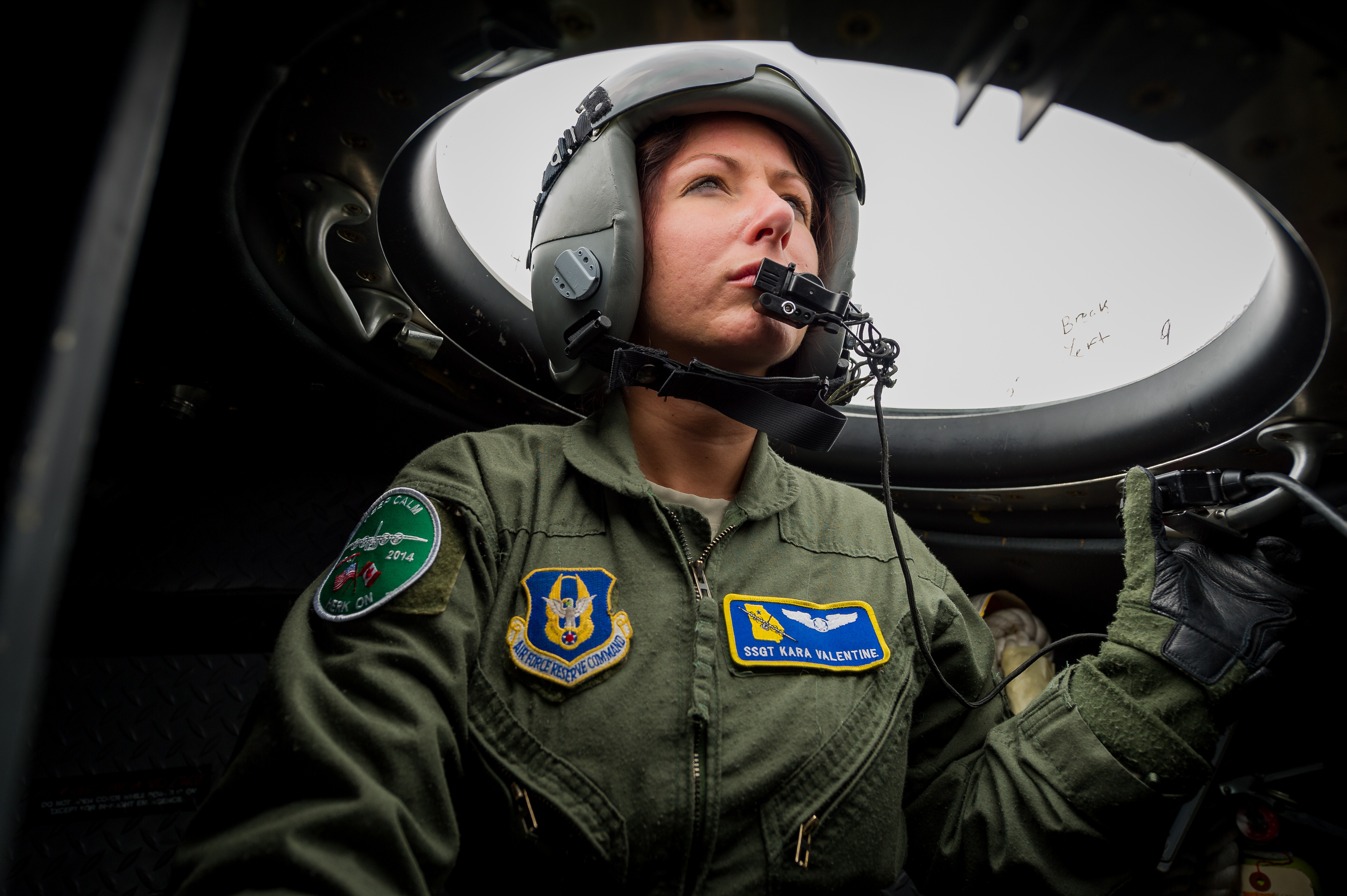
C-130 loadmaster watches through the observation bubble

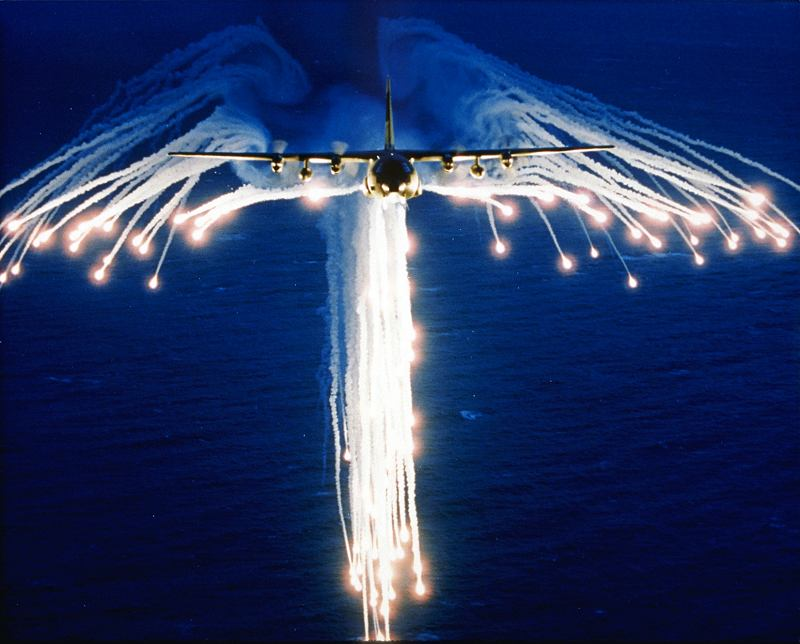
A Hercules deploying flares, sometimes referred to as Angel Flares due to the characteristic pattern

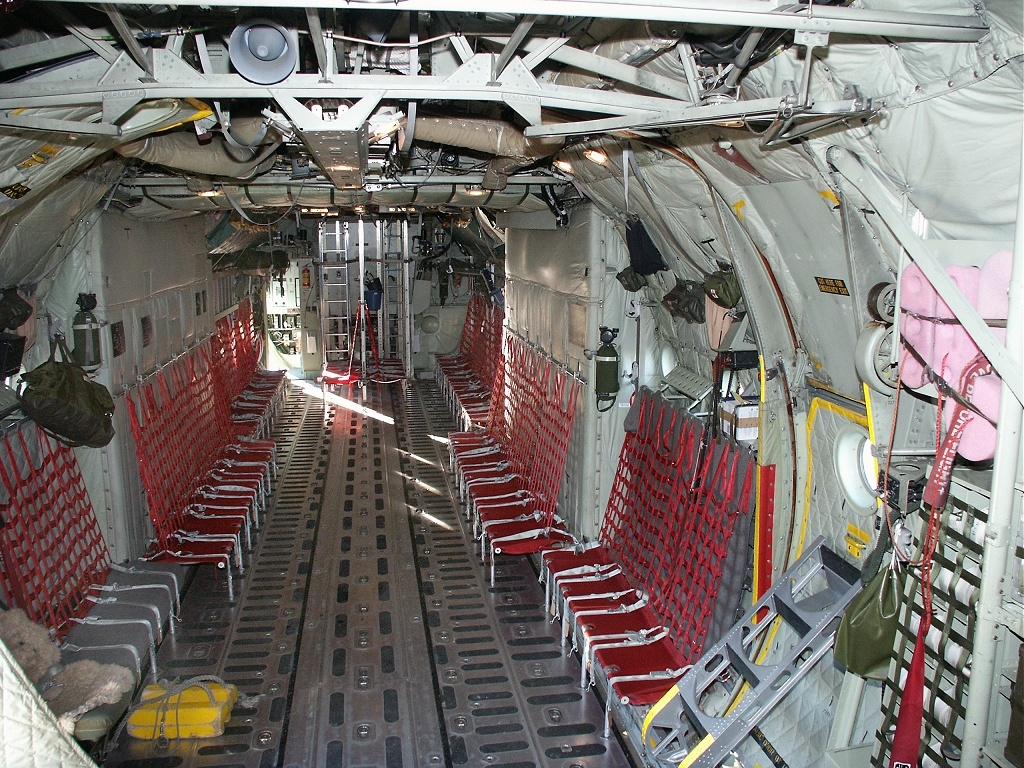
Cargo compartment of a Swedish Air Force C-130

Data from USAF C-130 Hercules fact sheet, International Directory of Military Aircraft, Complete Encyclopedia of World Aircraft, and Encyclopedia of Modern Military Aircraft.

General characteristics

- Crew: 5 (2 pilots, CSO/navigator, flight engineer and loadmaster)
- Capacity: 42,000 lb (19,000 kg) payload
  - C-130E/H/J cargo hold: length, 40 ft (12.19 m); width, 9 ft 11 in (3.02 m); height, 9 ft (2.74 m). Rear ramp: length, 123 in (3.12 m); width, 119 in (3.02 m)
  - C-130J-30 cargo hold: length, 55 ft (16.76 m); width, 9 ft 11 in (3.02 m); height, 9 ft (2.74 m). Rear ramp: length, 123 inches (3.12 m); width, 119 in (3.02 m)
  - 92 passengers or
  - 64 airborne troops or
  - 74 litter patients with 5 medical crew or
  - 6 pallets or
  - 2–3 Humvees or
  - 2 M113 armored personnel carriers
  - 1 CAESAR self-propelled howitzer
- Length: 97 ft 9 in (29.79 m)
- Wingspan: 132 ft 7 in (40.41 m)
- Height: 38 ft 3 in (11.66 m)
- Wing area: 1,745 sq ft (162.1 m^{2})
- Airfoil: root: NACA 64A318; tip: NACA 64A412
- Empty weight: 75,800 lb (34,382 kg)
- Max takeoff weight: 155,000 lb (70,307 kg)
- Powerplant: 4 × Allison T56-A-15 turboprop engines, 4,590 shp (3,420 kW) each
- Propellers: 4-bladed Hamilton Standard 54H60 constant-speed fully feathering reversible propellers, 13 ft 6 in (4.11 m) diameter

Performance

- Maximum speed: 320 kn (370 mph, 590 km/h) at 20,000 ft (6,100 m)
- Cruise speed: 292 kn (336 mph, 541 km/h)
- Range: 2,050 nmi (2,360 mi, 3,800 km)
- Ferry range: 3,995 nmi (4,597 mi, 7,399 km)
- Service ceiling: 33,000 ft (10,000 m) empty

23,000 ft (7,000 m) with 42,000 lb (19,000 kg) payload

- Rate of climb: 1,830 ft/min (9.3 m/s)
- Takeoff distance: 3,586 ft (1,093 m) at 155,000 lb (70,307 kg) max gross weight;

1,400 ft (427 m) at 80,000 lb (36,287 kg) gross weight

Avionics

- Westinghouse Electronic Systems AN/APN-241 weather and navigational radar

== See also ==
Related development

- Lockheed AC-130
- Lockheed DC-130
- Lockheed EC-130
- Lockheed EC-130H Compass Call
- Lockheed HC-130
- Lockheed L-100 Hercules
- Lockheed LC-130
- Lockheed Martin C-130J Super Hercules
- Lockheed Martin KC-130
- Lockheed MC-130
- Lockheed RC-130
- Lockheed WC-130

Aircraft of comparable role, configuration, and era

- Antonov An-12
- Armstrong Whitworth AW.660 Argosy
- Blackburn Beverley
- Douglas C-133 Cargomaster
- Kawasaki C-1
- Shaanxi Y-8
- Short Belfast
- Transall C-160

Related lists

- List of tanker aircraft
- List of accidents and incidents involving the Lockheed C-130 Hercules
- List of non-carrier aircraft flown from aircraft carriers
- List of United States military aerial refueling aircraft
- List of military electronics of the United States

== Sources ==
- Borman, Martin W. (1999). Lockheed C-130 Hercules. Marlborough, UK: Crowood Press. ISBN 978-1-86126-205-9.
- Diehl, Alan E. (2002). Silent Knights: Blowing the Whistle on Military Accidents and Their Cover-ups. Dulles, Virginia: Brassey's Inc. ISBN 1-57488-544-8.
- Donald, David, ed. (1997). "Lockheed C-130 Hercules". The Complete Encyclopedia of World Aircraft. New York: Barnes & Noble Books. ISBN 0-7607-0592-5.
- Eden, Paul (2004). "Lockheed C-130 Hercules". Encyclopedia of Modern Military Aircraft. London: Amber Books. ISBN 1-904687-84-9.
- Frawley, Gerard (2002). The International Directory of Military Aircraft, 2002/03. Fyshwick, ACT, Australia: Aerospace Publications Pty Ltd. ISBN 1-875671-55-2.
- Olausson, Lars (March 2009). Lockheed Hercules Production List 1954–2011 (27th ed.). Såtenäs, Sweden: Self-published.
- Olausson, Lars (2010). Lockheed Hercules Production List 1954–2012 (28th ed.). Såtenäs, Sweden: Self-published.
- "Pentagon Over the Islands: The Thirty-Year History of Indonesian Military Aviation". Air Enthusiast Quarterly (2): 154–162. n.d. ISSN 0143-5450.
- Reed, Chris (1999). Lockheed C-130 Hercules and Its Variants. Atglen, Pennsylvania: Schiffer Publishing. ISBN 978-0-7643-0722-5.
