= Carol Ammons =

American politician

Member of the Illinois House of Representatives from the 103rd district
- Incumbent
- Assumed office January 2015
- Preceded by: Naomi Jakobsson

Personal details
- Party: Democratic
- Spouse: Aaron Ammons
- Relations: Titianna Ammons
- Children: 3
- Occupation: Illinois State Representative
- Profession: Social activist
- Website: Illinois General Assembly

Carol Ammons is a Democratic member of the Illinois House of Representatives who has represented the 103rd district since January 2015. The 103rd district includes all or parts of Champaign, Urbana, and Staley. She is the first African American woman to serve in the seat, and the first from Champaign County to be elected beyond the County Board level.

== Electoral career ==
Ammons' victory in the Illinois 2014 Primary Election for the Illinois House of Representatives' 103rd District was widely considered an upset. Her opponent, Sam Rosenberg, received the endorsement of retiring State Representative Naomi Jakobsson and the financial support of Illinois House Speaker Michael Madigan, whose political committees donated $60,422 to the Rosenberg campaign. Ammons' itemized campaign contributions amounted to $16,000 compared to Rosenberg's $185,000. In her subsequent campaigns, Ammons accepted Illinois House Speaker Michael Madigan's the financial support, including $10,000 from his "Friends of Mike Madigan" campaign committee in 2016.

During the 2014 campaign, Ammons claimed to have graduated from Walsingham University in London, UK. Critics and local media pointed out that Walsingham is considered to be a pay-for-play, "diploma mill" and is not included on any credentialed lists of British government institutions of higher learning. Critics called on Ammons to drop out of the race due to the claim and related controversy.

In 2015, following Ammons' election to the Illinois House but prior to taking office, it was announced that Ammons' husband, Aaron Ammons, was pardoned by the outgoing governor Pat Quinn for violent and non-violent crimes relating to heroin possession and other charges. When local media examined the pardon, they questioned if proper procedures had been followed and if Quinn had exhibited a lack of due diligence or shown favoritism when issuing the pardon. The pardon allowed Aaron Ammons to apply for and be granted Carol Ammons' seat on the Urbana City Council, which she was vacating to take office as State Representative.

In April 2015, Ammons formally announced that she was considering a run for Congress in Illinois' 13th Congressional District, but ultimately decided not to.

Ammons, while unopposed for reelection, was one of eight candidates endorsed by Bernie Sanders during his 2016 presidential campaign.

In 2020, Carol Ammons claimed to be Chairwoman of the Democratic Party for Champaign County, part of a months-long controversy.

== Illinois House of Representatives ==
The 103rd district primarily encompasses the Champaign-Urbana community, including the University of Illinois Urbana-Champaign campus. Ammons is also an active member of the Illinois Legislative Black Caucus and in early 2023 was named Joint Chair of the caucus.

=== Committees ===
As of 2022, Ammons serves on the following committees and subcommittees:

- Appropriations - Higher Education Committee
- Counties & Townships Committee
- Economic Opportunity & Equity Committee
- Energy & Environment Committee
- Ethics & Elections Committee
- Higher Education Committee
- Small Business, Tech Innovation, and Entrepreneurship Committee(Chairperson)
- Campaign Finance Subcommittee

=== Tenure ===
Bills of which Ammons is listed as the Primary Sponsor and which have gone on to become law in Illinois include HB3783, which amends the Illinois Environmental Protection Act to require the Illinois Environmental Protection Agency to certify that all workers who install coal combustion residual surface impoundments have completed specified trainings preparing them to do so, and HB1063, which repealed a statute that had created the criminal offense of transmitting HIV.

In January 2021, incoming Illinois House Speaker Chris Welch appointed Ammons to House leadership as the Democratic Conference Chair. In May 2021, Ammons attempted to halt the passage of a bill she opposed while she was presiding over the House floor, a "misuse of power" that resulted in her removal from House leadership the following weekend. Ammons was replaced as Democratic Conference Chair by Representative LaToya Greenwood.

In early 2023, Ammons received significant criticism from state and local media regarding her conduct following the death of Illinois State Senator Scott Bennett on December 9th, 2022 from complications related to a brain tumor. Ammons was criticized by Bennett's widow, Stacy, for making phone calls within an hour of Bennett's death attempting to secure an appointment to Bennett's senate seat, a claim which Ammons later confirmed after an initial denial. The appointment to Bennett's seat ultimately went to Champaign City Township Assessor Paul Faraci, a close friend of the Bennetts'. A month after Faraci's appointment, Ammons appeared as a guest on her husband Aaron’s WEFT radio show where she called the process a “public lynching” and stated that she had “selflessly sought the Bennett seat."

In July 2026, Ammons and her husband, Champaign County Clerk Aaron Ammons, were indicted by a federal grand jury on charges of wire fraud, false statements, and conspiracy to obstruct justice. Ammons directed state funding to three separate nonprofits based in the Champaign-Urbana area, beginning in the fiscal year that began July 1, 2019., three of which were directed by their daughter, Titianna Ammons. An Illinois House committee has been triggered by a petition of House Republicans to investigate Ammons.

== Personal life ==
Ammons currently resides in Urbana with her husband, Aaron Ammons. Aaron Ammons is currently serving as the County Clerk for Champaign County, Illinois. Carol and Aarons' daughter, Titianna, served on the Champaign County Board until her resignation in 2021.

In the 2016 United States presidential election, Ammons served as a presidential elector from Illinois.

In 2020, Ammons was investigated for the theft of a Coach purse from a non-profit resale shop in Urbana. After a multi-month investigation, a special prosecutor determined that there was “insufficient evidence to meet the State [of Illinois]’s burden of proving guilt beyond a reasonable doubt” and ultimately declined to prosecute Ammons.

== Electoral history ==
2014 Primary Election Results – Illinois’ 103rd House District
Party	Candidate	Votes	%
Democratic	Carol Ammons	3,298	56.91
Democratic	Samuel A. Rosenberg	2,497	43.09
Total votes		5,795	100.00

2014 General Election Results – Illinois’ 103rd House District
Party	Candidate	Votes	%
Democratic	Carol Ammons	13,362	61.42
Republican	Kristin Williamson	8,392	38.58
Total votes		21,754	100.00

2016 General Election Results – Illinois’ 103rd House District
Party	Candidate	Votes	%
Democratic	Carol Ammons (incumbent)	34,071	100.00
Total votes		34,071	100.00

2018 General Election Results – Illinois’ 103rd House District
Party	Candidate	Votes	%
Democratic	Carol Ammons (incumbent)	30,802	100.00
Total votes		30,802	100.00

2020 General Election Results – Illinois’ 103rd House District
Party	Candidate	Votes	%
Democratic	Carol Ammons (incumbent)	31,127	78.65
Libertarian	Brad Bielert	8,452	21.35
Total votes		39,579	100.00
