= Paul Faraci =

Illinois State Senator for the 52nd District

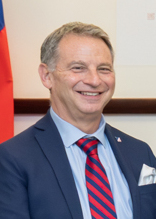
- Faraci in 2026

Member of the Illinois Senate from the 52nd district
- Incumbent
- Assumed office January 11, 2023
- Preceded by: Stacy Bennett

City of Champaign Township Assessor
- In office January 1, 2018 – March 7, 2023
- Preceded by: LaDonna Kaiser
- Succeeded by: Katherine Moore

Deputy Mayor of Champaign
- In office May 5, 2015 – May 2, 2017
- Mayor: Deborah Frank Feinen
- Preceded by: Tom Bruno
- Succeeded by: Will Kyles

Member of the Champaign City Council for the 5th district
- In office May 3, 2011 – May 2, 2017
- Preceded by: Gordy Hulten
- Succeeded by: Vanna Pianfetti

Member of the Champaign County Board for the 7th district
- In office 2000–2002

Personal details
- Born: Chicago, Illinois
- Party: Democratic
- Spouse: Stephanie Faraci
- Children: 1
- Website: http://www.senatorfaraci.com/

Paul Faraci is an American politician from Illinois who has served as a Democratic member of the Illinois Senate for the 52nd district since 2023. He previously served as the Deputy Mayor of Champaign, Illinois from 2015 to 2017 and served on the Champaign City Council representing the 5th district from 2011 to 2017.

Faraci was appointed to the Illinois Senate to fill a term left vacant by the sudden death of Senator Scott Bennett in 2022. He was elected to a full term in 2024. During his time in office, Faraci has focused on supporting individuals with disabilities, increasing education funding, promoting workforce development in Central Illinois, and enhancing environmental protections for the Mahomet Aquifer. The 52nd district includes Champaign, Danville, Rantoul, St. Joseph, and Urbana.

== Early life and career ==
Faraci was born in Chicago, Illinois to Piero and Flora Faraci. Both were well-regarded Champaign restaurateurs and small business owners. His father Piero owned an italian resturaunt named the Great Impasta and his mother Flora owned the Jane Addams Book Shop in Downtown Champaign. Faraci later opened and operated his own restaurant in Downtown Champaign, the City of New Orleans.

Following his career in the restaurant industry, Faraci worked as a senior account manager for the Illinois Department of Commerce and Economic Opportunity before serving as a senior advisor to Illinois State Treasurer Mike Frerichs in the mid-2010s.

=== Early political career ===
In 2000, Faraci was elected as a Democrat for a two year term on the Champaign County Board for the 7th district. He did not seek reelection. In 2011, Faraci was elected to the 5th District on the Champaign City Council as a write-in candidate in a three-way race to succeed council member Gordy Hulten. He was sworn in on May 3, 2011. Faraci was reelected in 2013 and served until May 2, 2017. He was succeeded by Vanna Pianfetti. He also served as Deputy Mayor from 2015 to 2017.

Faraci stands with U.S. Representative Nikki Budzinski (center) in 2023

In 2018, Faraci became the City of Champaign Township assessor following an uncontested election the prior year. He succeeded appointed Republican LaDonna Kaiser, who served for six months following the resignation of previous Republican assessor Brian Christie. Christie resigned on June 30, 2017 after Faraci's election but before his inauguration the following January.

Faraci was reelected assessor in 2021 and served until March 7th, 2023, resigning after his appointment to the Illinois State Senate. He was succeeded by his deputy assessor, Katherine Moore.

== Illinois Senate ==
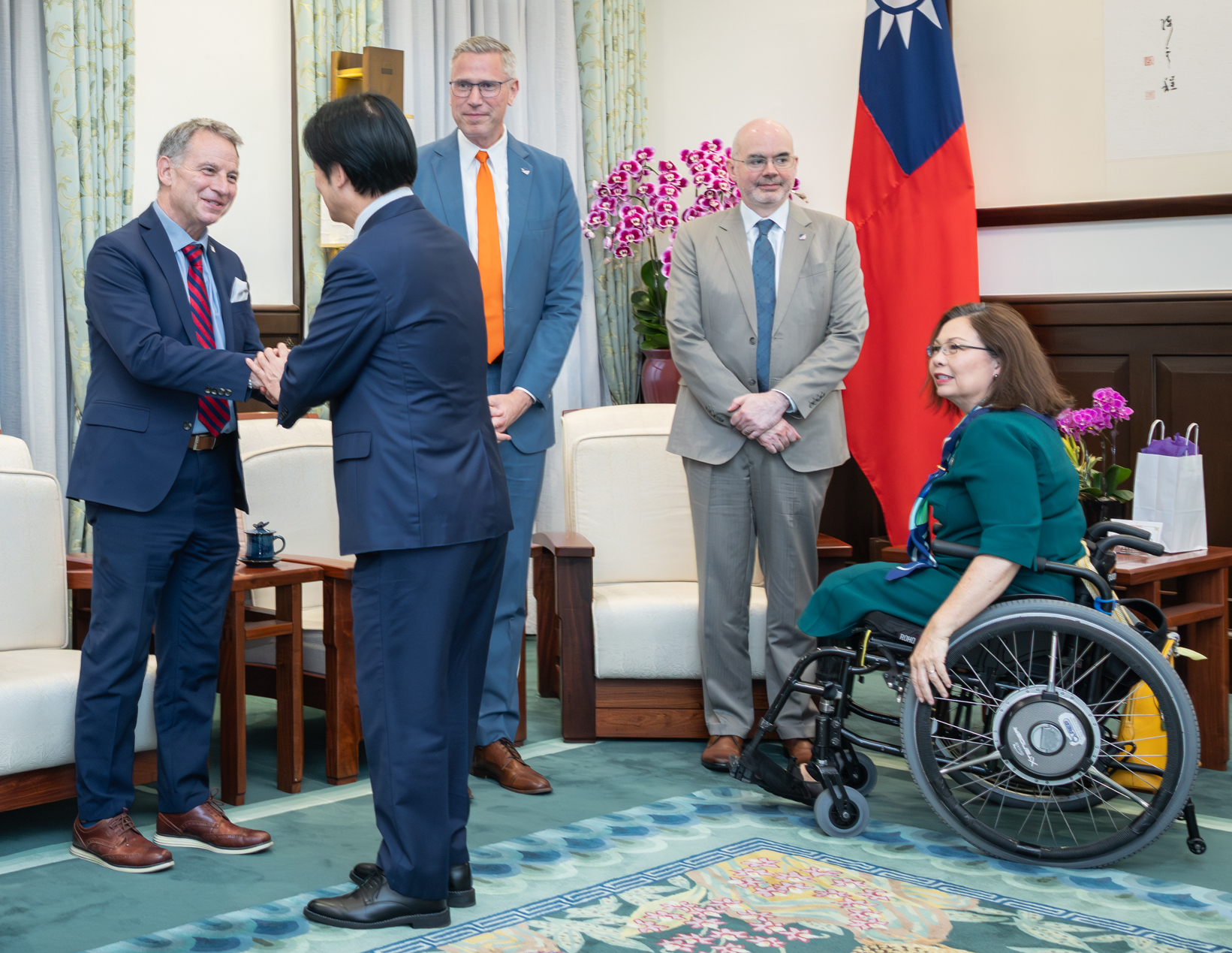
Faraci shaking hands with Taiwanese President Lai Ching-te in 2026

On December 9, 2022, Illinois State Senator Scott Bennett died from complications due to a brain tumor. This created a vacancy in his seat for both the remainder of the 102nd Illinois General Assembly and the upcoming 103rd General Assembly, to which Bennett had just been elected. Scott Bennett's widow, Stacy, was appointed to fill the remainder of her husband's unfinished term but was not a candidate to fill the upcoming full-term vacancy. On January 7, 2023, Faraci was appointed by the Democratic county party chairpersons of Champaign and Vermilion Counties to serve out Bennett's full term. He took office on January 11, 2023. Faraci had been a close friend of Bennett and has emphasized honoring his legacy at multiple points throughout his term, especially when discussing legislation to support individuals with disabilities.

Faraci was elected to a full term in 2024.

In 2025, Faraci was the chief sponsor of Illinois Senate Bill 1723, which increased environmental protections for the Mahomet Aquifer, a sole-source aquifer supplying clean drinking water to "approximately 800,000 people across 15 counties in East Central Illinois." The bill was passed on a bipartisan basis and was signed into law by Governor JB Pritzker in August, 2025.

In June 2026, Faraci accompanied U.S. Senator Tammy Duckworth and Illinois Treasurer Mike Frerichs on a diplomatic visit to Taiwan. The visit included a meeting with Taiwanese President Lai Ching-te.
