= Vegetable Garden Protection Act =

Vegetable Garden Protection Act (HB0633) is an Illinois law signed in 2021 which protects the right of Illinois residents to grow food and edible plants on residential property.

The law prevents local governments and municipalities in Illinois from passing ordinances or rules that ban vegetable gardens, and covers ground plots and raised beds used for vegetables, herbs, fruits, flowers, pollinator plants, and leafy greens.

Illinois is the second state to legally protect for the right to grow one's own food after Florida enacted the Vegetable Garden Protection Act in 2019.
