= Gibson City, Illinois =

Gibson City
- City
- Nickname: The BIG LITTLE CITY of Ford County, Illinois.
- Location of Gibson City in Ford County, Illinois.

- Location of Illinois in the United States
- Coordinates: 40°27′58″N 88°22′29″W
- Country: United States
- State: Illinois
- County: Ford

Government
  - Mayor: Daniel E. Dickey

Area
  - Total: 2.36 sq mi (6.10 km^{2})
  - Land: 2.32 sq mi (6.01 km^{2})
  - Water: 0.035 sq mi (0.09 km^{2})
- Elevation: 745 ft (227 m)

Population (2020)
  - Total: 3,475
  - Density: 1,497.2/sq mi (578.07/km^{2})
- Time zone: UTC-6 (CST)
  - Summer (DST): UTC-5 (CDT)
- ZIP Code(s): 60936
- Area code(s): 217, 447
- FIPS code: 17-29125
- GNIS feature ID: 2394891
- Wikimedia Commons: Gibson City, Illinois
- Website: gibsoncityillinois.com

Gibson City is a city in Ford County, Illinois, United States. The population was 3,475 at the 2020 census.

== History ==
The site of Gibson City was purchased and platted by Jonathan B. Lott in 1869. In 1870, Lott built a home and a post office there, and several stores and a grain elevator were constructed. Lott named the place Gibson after the maiden name of his wife, Margaret Gibson Lott, and City was added later by the post office department. Both the Gilman, Clinton and Springfield Railroad and the Chicago and Paducah Railroad reached the town in 1871, allowing its population to grow. Gibson City was incorporated as a village in 1872, with T. D. Spalding, J. H. Collier, S. J. LeFevre, Bruce McCormick, and W. T. Kerr serving as the first trustees. Spalding acted as the first village president (mayor). A third railroad, the LaFayette, Muncie and Bloomington Railroad, was built through Gibson City in 1874. In the same year, one of the railroads signed a contract that paid Augustana College, located in Paxton at the time, a commission of $1 per acre on all railroad land sold to Swedish settlers.

In 1883, a fire in the town caused $50,000 ($1,500,000 in 2023 dollars) in property damage.

On August 12, 2021, the town experienced what has been labeled as a "Once in a Millennium" flood, due to high levels rainfall. The town received around 10 inches of rain in ten hours, with roads becoming unusable and numerous water rescues conducted. Thomas M. Bennett who is a Gibson City native, and at that time represented the district Gibson City resides in to the Illinois House of Representatives, is quoted as saying about the event: “The rains came and came and you thought there was somebody named Noah.” The flood caused around $10-$12 million in damages, and left many people stranded and/or homeless.

== Geography ==
According to the 2021 census gazetteer files, Gibson City has a total area of 2.36 square miles (6.11 km^{2}), of which 2.32 square miles (6.01 km^{2}) (or 98.47%) is land and 0.04 square miles (0.10 km^{2}) (or 1.53%) is water.

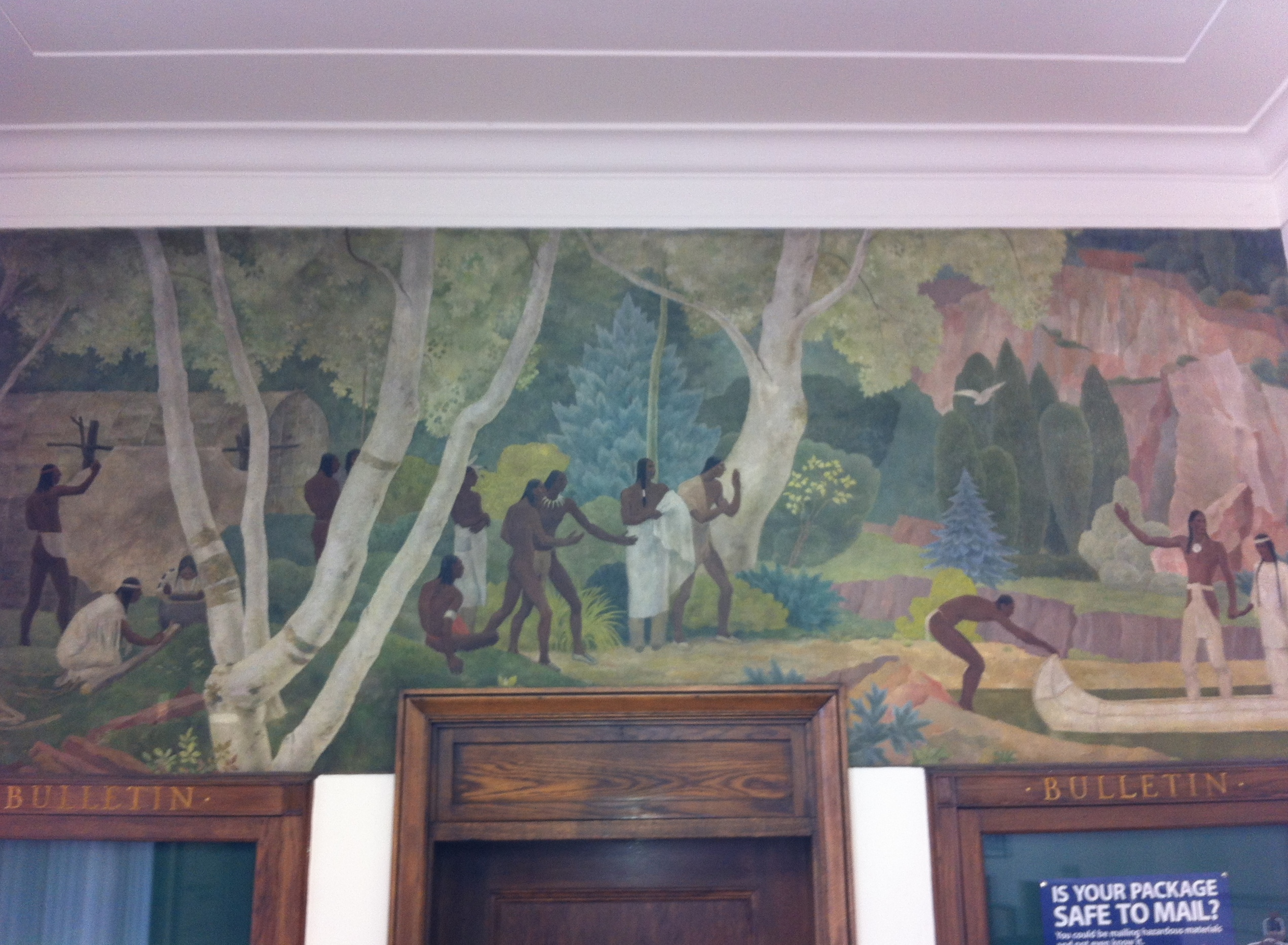
The 1940 WPA mural "Hiawatha Returning with Minnehaha" by Francis Foy is on display in the Gibson City Post Office

=== Climate ===
Climate data for Gibson City, Illinois (1991–2020)
Month	Jan	Feb	Mar	Apr	May	Jun	Jul	Aug	Sep	Oct	Nov	Dec	Year
Mean daily maximum °F (°C)	32.0 (0.0)	36.5 (2.5)	48.2 (9.0)	61.6 (16.4)	72.5 (22.5)	81.7 (27.6)	84.0 (28.9)	82.7 (28.2)	77.8 (25.4)	64.1 (17.8)	49.3 (9.6)	36.7 (2.6)	60.6 (15.9)
Daily mean °F (°C)	24.0 (−4.4)	28.1 (−2.2)	38.8 (3.8)	50.3 (10.2)	61.9 (16.6)	71.2 (21.8)	73.8 (23.2)	72.1 (22.3)	65.5 (18.6)	52.7 (11.5)	40.1 (4.5)	29.4 (−1.4)	50.7 (10.4)
Mean daily minimum °F (°C)	16.0 (−8.9)	19.7 (−6.8)	29.3 (−1.5)	39.1 (3.9)	51.2 (10.7)	60.7 (15.9)	63.6 (17.6)	61.5 (16.4)	53.2 (11.8)	41.4 (5.2)	30.9 (−0.6)	22.1 (−5.5)	40.7 (4.9)
Average precipitation inches (mm)	1.95 (50)	1.77 (45)	2.74 (70)	3.57 (91)	4.51 (115)	4.57 (116)	3.57 (91)	3.64 (92)	3.20 (81)	3.40 (86)	2.63 (67)	2.18 (55)	37.73 (959)
Average snowfall inches (cm)	6.7 (17)	4.1 (10)	1.4 (3.6)	0.3 (0.76)	0.0 (0.0)	0.0 (0.0)	0.0 (0.0)	0.0 (0.0)	0.0 (0.0)	0.1 (0.25)	1.1 (2.8)	4.6 (12)	18.3 (46.41)
Source: NOAA

== Demographics ==
Historical population
Census	Pop.	Note	%±
1880	1,260		—
1890	1,803		43.1%
1900	2,054		13.9%
1910	2,086		1.6%
1920	2,234		7.1%
1930	2,163		−3.2%
1940	2,401		11.0%
1950	3,029		26.2%
1960	3,453		14.0%
1970	3,454		0.0%
1980	3,498		1.3%
1990	3,396		−2.9%
2000	3,373		−0.7%
2010	3,407		1.0%
2020	3,475		2.0%
U.S. Decennial Census

=== 2020 census ===
As of the 2020 census, Gibson City had a population of 3,475. There were 835 families residing in the city, and the population density was 1,474.33 inhabitants per square mile (569.24/km^{2}). The median age was 44.8 years. 21.0% of residents were under the age of 18 and 23.4% of residents were 65 years of age or older. For every 100 females there were 92.9 males, and for every 100 females age 18 and over there were 88.3 males age 18 and over.

0.0% of residents lived in urban areas, while 100.0% lived in rural areas.

There were 1,535 households in Gibson City, of which 26.2% had children under the age of 18 living in them. Of all households, 42.6% were married-couple households, 19.5% were households with a male householder and no spouse or partner present, and 31.8% were households with a female householder and no spouse or partner present. About 39.0% of all households were made up of individuals and 19.6% had someone living alone who was 65 years of age or older.

There were 1,664 housing units, of which 7.8% were vacant. The homeowner vacancy rate was 2.0% and the rental vacancy rate was 9.2%. The average housing unit density was 705.98 per square mile (272.58/km^{2}).

Racial composition as of the 2020 census
Race	Number	Percent
White	3,210	92.4%
Black or African American	27	0.8%
American Indian and Alaska Native	3	0.1%
Asian	28	0.8%
Native Hawaiian and Other Pacific Islander	0	0.0%
Some other race	40	1.2%
Two or more races	167	4.8%
Hispanic or Latino (of any race)	115	3.3%

=== Income and poverty ===
The median income for a household in the city was $44,544, and the median income for a family was $68,977. Males had a median income of $47,443 versus $32,313 for females. The per capita income for the city was $28,872. About 7.2% of families and 11.2% of the population were below the poverty line, including 9.4% of those under age 18 and 4.9% of those age 65 or over.

== Transportation ==
Illinois State Highways 9, 47, and 54 intersect on the edge of Gibson City.

The Norfolk Southern Wabash line runs through Gibson City.

== Media ==
=== Newspaper ===
The town's former newspaper was the Gibson City Courier, published from February 21, 1874, until December 30, 2015. The Courier was last owned by The Pantagraph out of Bloomington after being locally owned for several decades. Gibson City is also served by the Ford County Record based in nearby Paxton.

=== Radio station ===
WGCY is an FM station licensed to Gibson City Broadcasting at a frequency of 106.3 MHz. Its programming consists of easy listening music and local high school sports.

== Notable people ==
- Scott M. Bennett, member of the Illinois Senate, Gibson City native.
- Thomas M. Bennett, former member of both the Illinois House of Representatives and the Illinois Senate, Gibson City native.
- Dwight Eddleman, legendary Illinois Fighting Illini three-sport athlete.
- Earl Hamilton, pitcher for the Detroit Tigers, St. Louis Browns, Pittsburgh Pirates and Philadelphia Phillies
- Russell Johnson, cartoonist
- John Arthur Love, 36th Governor of Colorado and the Director of the Office of Energy Policy in the Nixon administration.
- Frances McDormand, actress; winner of the Triple Crown of Acting, born in Gibson City
- Larry Pratt, catcher for the Boston Red Sox, Brooklyn Tip-Tops and Newark Pepper
