= WGCY =

- Gibson City, Illinois; United States
- Frequency: 106.3 MHz
- Branding: WGCY 106.3

Programming
- Format: Beautiful music; easy listening

Ownership
- Owner: F&G Broadcasting

History
- First air date: November 28, 1983
- Call sign meaning: Gibson City

Technical information
- Licensing authority: FCC
- Facility ID: 20383
- Class: A
- ERP: 6,000 watts
- HAAT: 98 meters (322 ft)
- Transmitter coordinates: 40.566°N 88.347°W

Links
- Public license information: Public file; LMS
- Webcast: Listen live (sports broadcasts)

WGCY (106.3 FM) is a commercial radio station licensed to Gibson City, Illinois, United States. The station is locally owned and operated by the McCullough family (d/b/a F&G Broadcasting) and began broadcasting on November 28, 1983. The station's studios are located at 607 South Sangamon Avenue in Gibson City.

WGCY is one of the few remaining commercial radio stations in North America to feature the beautiful music format, consisting chiefly of a mix of instrumental covers of pop songs and soft vocals (including softer Top 40 oldies, standards, and album cuts by MOR artists). In addition to its easy listening music, WGCY features local newscasts, farm reports and sports play-by-play and hourly newscasts from CBS News Radio.

As of late 2020, newer music of the 1960s and 1970s and forgotten oldies have been played during the day. Soft Nights is still the evening format into overnights.

The station expanded its broadcast schedule to 24 hours a day in 2006 after having previously signed off at Midnight. Popular on-air features include local high school sports featuring the Gibson City-Melvin-Sibley Falcons, Radiofied Ads (a Tradio-type feature), and the Friday Afternoon Oldies Get-Together with Kent Casson.

The Tom Benefiel Show is aired from 6 until Midnight on Friday evenings since August 1995. It is billed as "Train-Wreck Radio" and features big band, jazz, swing, songs from the Hit Parade era, and more modern rock and roll fare and typically has a Friday Night Spotlight each week.
