= Russell Johnson (cartoonist) =

American cartoonist

- Born: December 10, 1893; Gibson City, Illinois
- Died: September 7, 1995 (aged 101); Gibson City, Illinois
- Education: School of the Art Institute of Chicago; Dixon College and Norman School
- Occupation: Cartoonist
- Known for: Creator/artist of Mister Oswald

Russell Johnson (December 10, 1893 – September 7, 1995) was an American cartoonist, best known as the creator and artist of Mister Oswald, a monthly comic strip that ran for more than six decades in the national trade journal now called Hardware Retailing. The strip documents a large portion of the history of American business life, as seen through the eyes of the main character, Oscar S. Oswald, a prominent citizen of the fictional Dippy Center, US. Although the strip was known primarily to hardware retailers, a book, Forty Years With Mister Oswald, was published in 1968, collecting the comic strips.

== Biography ==
Johnson was born on a farm outside Gibson City, Illinois. He graduated from Dixon College and Norman School in 1915, whereupon he left small-town life for the big city and a job at Montgomery Ward's in Chicago. As someone who grew up land-locked on a farm in Illinois, Johnson yearned to be out on the high seas, like his favorite comic strip characters, the Katzenjammer Kids, so during World War I he joined the US Navy. Johnson, however, was an excellent marksman from his years of hunting, and was removed from a ship after two weeks, and was made a shooting instructor. He spent the rest of his tour in the Navy on land. While in the Navy, Johnson also began drawing cartoons for Afloat and Ashore, a Naval paper published in Charleston. After the War, he took night classes at the Chicago Academy of Fine Arts, studying under Billy DeBeck, the creator of Barney Google, and Carl Ed, the creator of Harold Teen.

In 1921, Johnson returned to Gibson City to work in his father's hardware store. In addition to his regular work in the store, Johnson drew advertising cartoons for the store's window displays, which appeared every Tuesday. Johnson's aunt saw his cartoons and was able to get him some cartoon work in the local papers. Soon thereafter, Johnson was asked by the editor of Hardware Retailing to draw some cartoons for their magazine. He started contributing work to Hardware Retailing in 1925. Two years later, in October 1927, Mister Oswald was born, appearing in a twelve-panel, Sunday page-format strip, titled "It's a Sad Store, Mates." By the early 1930s, Johnson also took assignments from the Armstrong Cork Company, doing strips like Bunker Bunk and the Boys (about wholesalers) and Sellem and Son (about retail salesmen). He additionally made Adam and Steve for The Sporting Goods Dealer, and a full-page monthly strip for the Remington Arms Company.

Mister Oswald is a metanym of one segment of U.S. social history. Mister Oswald shows how the hardware business, changed over the years. And Johnson knew his stuff, as he ran both a hardware store and a shoe store, all while drawing his cartoons. His ideas were derived from his daily life.

Eventually, Johnson dropped his other strips to work exclusively on Mister Oswald. Even after his retirement from retailing in 1963, he continued his strip for many years, finally handing it over to Larry Day in 1989, at the age of 95. Russ Johnson had worked on his strip continuously for 62 years. Even in retirement, Johnson continued to work, trying to peddle a mainstream comic strip about retirees. The strip remained unpublished. He died on September 7, 1995, at the age of 101.
