= Triple Crown of Acting =

Winners of the three main U.S. awards

The "triple crown of acting" is a term used in the American entertainment industry to describe performers who have won an Academy Award, Emmy Award, and Tony Award in acting categories, the highest awards recognized in American film, television, and theater, respectively. The term "triple crown" is used in other competitive areas, such as the Triple Crown of Horse Racing.

Only 24 people, 15 women and 9 men, have achieved the "triple crown of acting".

Helen Hayes became the first actor to do so with her Emmy Award on February 5, 1953. Less than two months later, Thomas Mitchell became the first man to do so when he received a Tony Award on March 29, 1953. Hayes, Rita Moreno, and Viola Davis are the only Triple Crown winners in competitive acting categories who have also won a Grammy Award to complete the EGOT (Emmy, Grammy, Oscar, Tony).

Living winners of the "triple crown of acting" are Rita Moreno, Jeremy Irons, Vanessa Redgrave, Al Pacino, Geoffrey Rush, Ellen Burstyn, Helen Mirren, Frances McDormand, Jessica Lange, and Viola Davis.

== Summary ==
- The year in the Oscar, Emmy, and Tony columns indicates the year the actor first won the award
- The total wins column indicates the total number of competitive Oscar, Emmy, and Tony wins

Actor	Completed	Years to complete	Oscar	Emmy	Tony	Total wins	Ref.
Helen Hayes	1953	21	1932	1953	1947	5	
Thomas Mitchell	1953	13	1940	1953	1953	3	
Ingrid Bergman	1960	15	1945	1960	1947	6	
Shirley Booth	1962	13	1953	1962	1949	6	
Melvyn Douglas	1968	8	1964	1968	1960	4	
Paul Scofield	1969	7	1967	1969	1962	3	
Jack Albertson	1975	10	1969	1975	1965	4	
Rita Moreno	1977	15	1962	1977	1975	4	
Maureen Stapleton	1981	31	1982	1968	1951	4	
Jason Robards	1988	29	1977	1988	1959	4	
Jessica Tandy	1989	42	1990	1988	1948	5	
Jeremy Irons	1997	13	1991	1997	1984	4	
Anne Bancroft	1999	41	1963	1999	1958	4	
Vanessa Redgrave	2003	25	1978	1981	2003	4	
Maggie Smith	2003	33	1970	2003	1990	7	
Al Pacino	2004	35	1993	2004	1969	5	
Geoffrey Rush	2009	12	1997	2005	2009	3	
Ellen Burstyn	2009	34	1975	2009	1975	4	
Christopher Plummer	2011	38	2012	1977	1974	5	
Helen Mirren	2015	19	2007	1996	2015	6	
Frances McDormand	2015	18	1997	2015	2011	5	
Jessica Lange	2016	33	1983	2009	2016	6	
Viola Davis	2017	16	2017	2015	2001	4	
Glenda Jackson	2018	47	1971	1972	2018	6	

== "Triple crown" achievements ==
Ordered by date of achieving the triple crown.

=== Helen Hayes ===
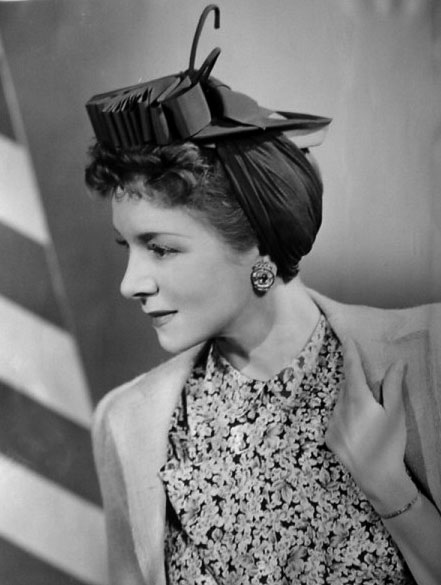
Helen Hayes (1940)

The American actress Helen Hayes (1900–1993) was the first performer to achieve the triple crown of acting, doing so in 1953. Hayes was a nine-time Emmy, three-time Tony, and two-time Oscar nominee, for a total of 14 triple crown (TC) nominations. She won two Oscars, two Tonys and an Emmy for a total of five competitive TC awards. Hayes also won a Grammy in 1977 for Best Spoken Word Recording to complete the EGOT. Hayes is one of only three Triple Crown winners (along with Rita Moreno and Viola Davis) to have achieved EGOT status.

- Academy Awards:
1. 1932: Best Actress in a Leading Role – The Sin of Madelon Claudet
2. 1971: Best Actress in a Supporting Role – Airport
- Primetime Emmy Awards:
1. 1953: Best Actress
- Tony Awards:
1. 1947: Best Actress in a Play – Happy Birthday
2. 1958: Best Leading Actress in a Play – Time Remembered

=== Thomas Mitchell ===
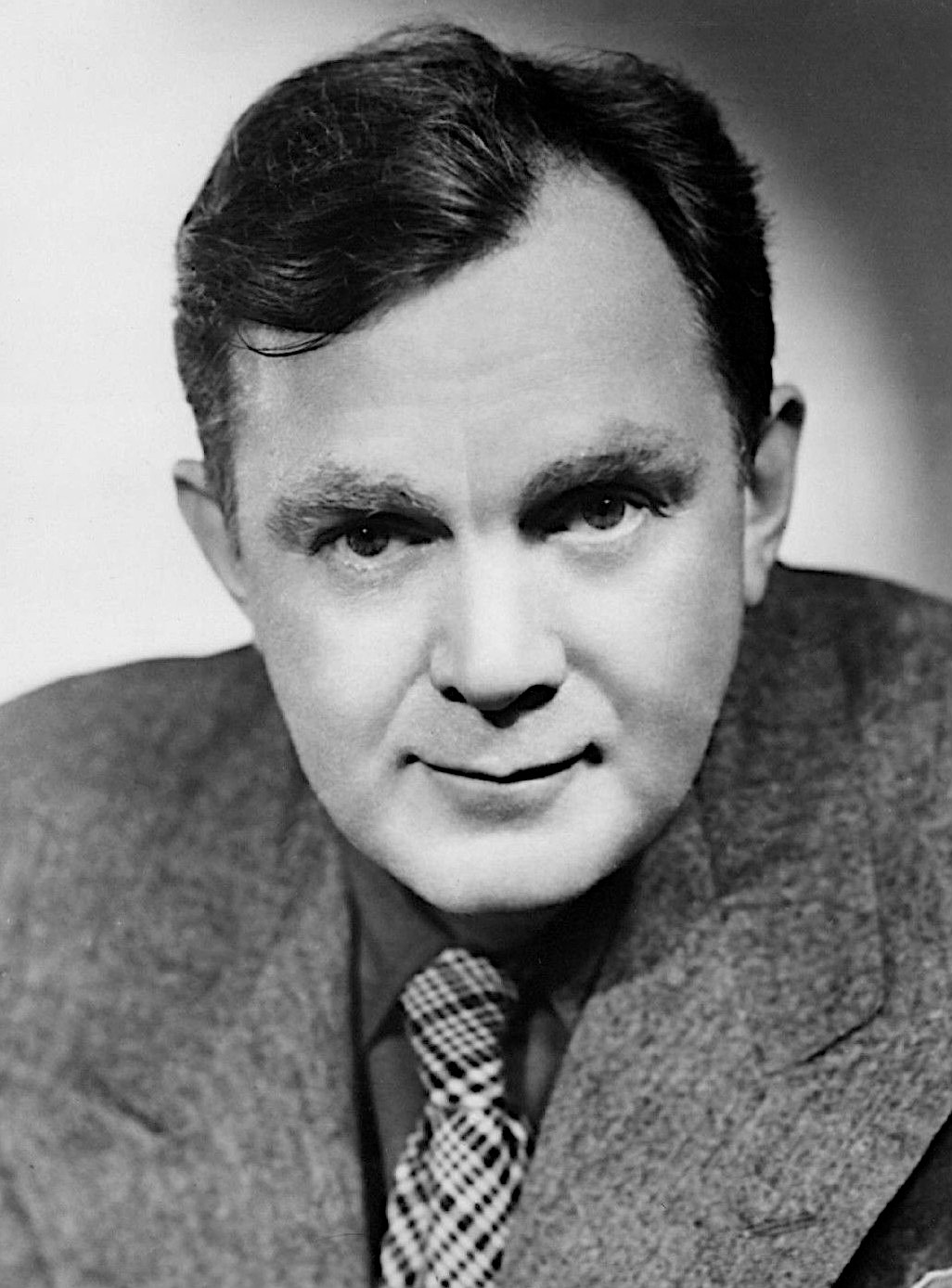
Thomas Mitchell (1953)

The American actor and writer Thomas Mitchell (1892–1962) completed the triple crown in 1953, two months after Helen Hayes. He was a three-time Emmy, two-time Oscar, and one-time Tony nominee, for a total of six TC nominations. Mitchell won three awards.

- Academy Awards:
1. 1940: Best Actor in a Supporting Role – Stagecoach
- Primetime Emmy Awards:
1. 1953: Best Actor
- Tony Awards:
1. 1953: Distinguished Musical Actor – Hazel Flagg

=== Ingrid Bergman ===
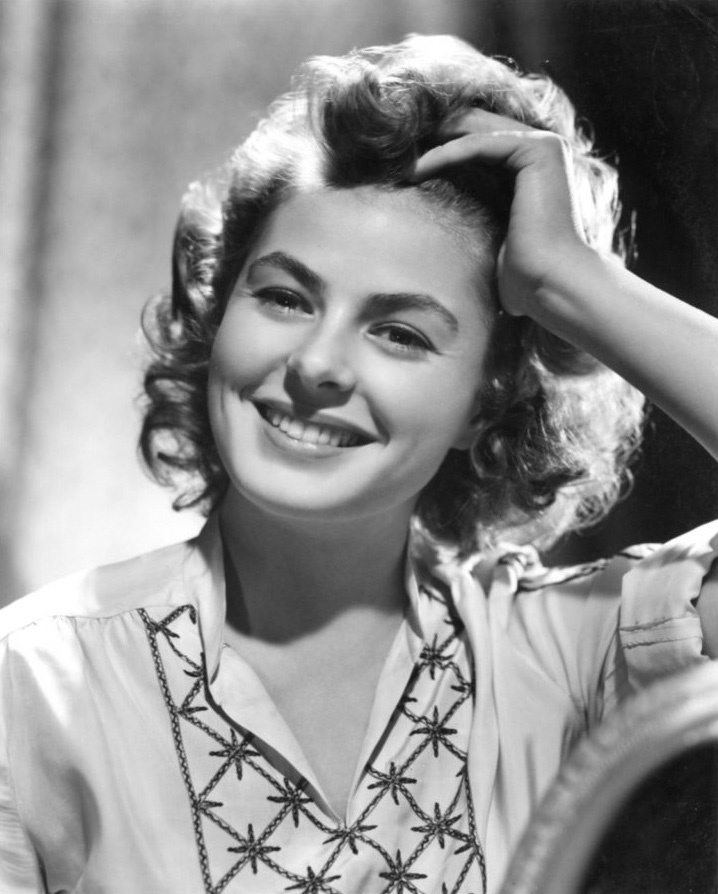
Ingrid Bergman (1944)

The Swedish actress Ingrid Bergman (1915–1982) completed the triple crown in 1960 and was the youngest to achieve it. She was a seven-time Oscar, three-time Emmy, and one-time Tony nominee, for a total of 11 TC nominations. Bergman won six awards.

- Academy Awards:
1. 1945: Best Actress in a Leading Role – Gaslight
2. 1957: Best Actress in a Leading Role – Anastasia
3. 1975: Best Actress in a Supporting Role – Murder on the Orient Express
- Primetime Emmy Awards:
1. 1960: Outstanding Single Performance by an Actress (Lead or Support) – Startime (Episode: "The Turn of the Screw")
2. 1982: Outstanding Lead Actress in a Limited Series or Movie – A Woman Called Golda
- Tony Awards:
1. 1947: Best Actress in a Play – Joan of Lorraine

=== Shirley Booth ===
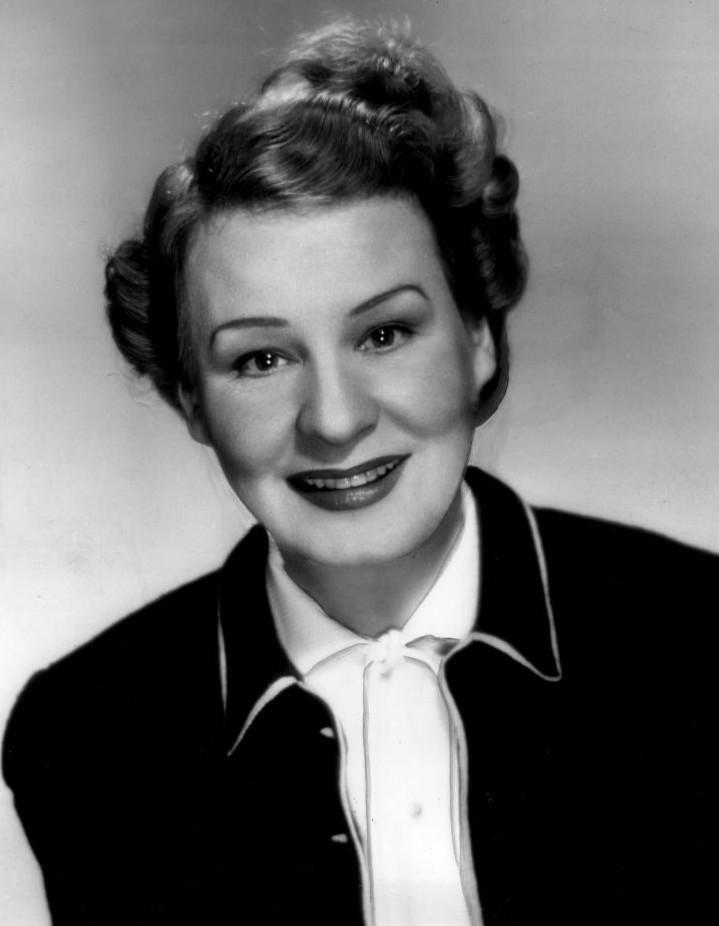
Shirley Booth (1950)

The American actress Shirley Booth (1898–1992) completed the triple crown in 1962. She was a four-time Emmy, three-time Tony, and one-time Oscar nominee, for a total of eight TC nominations. Booth won six awards.

- Academy Awards:
1. 1953: Best Actress in a Leading Role – Come Back, Little Sheba
- Primetime Emmy Awards:
1. 1962: Outstanding Continued Performance by an Actress in a Series (Lead) – Hazel
2. 1963: Outstanding Continued Performance by an Actress in a Series (Lead) – Hazel
- Tony Awards:
1. 1949: Best Supporting or Featured Actress in a Play – Goodbye, My Fancy
2. 1950: Best Actress in a Play – Come Back, Little Sheba
3. 1953: Distinguished Dramatic Actress – The Time of the Cuckoo

=== Melvyn Douglas ===
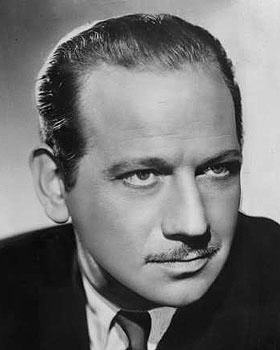
Melvyn Douglas (c. 1939)

The American actor Melvyn Douglas (1901–1981) completed the triple crown in 1968. He was a three-time Oscar, two-time Emmy, and one-time Tony nominee, for a total of six TC nominations. Douglas won four awards.

- Academy Awards:
1. 1964: Best Actor in a Supporting Role – Hud
2. 1979: Best Actor in a Supporting Role – Being There
- Primetime Emmy Awards:
1. 1968: Outstanding Single Performance by an Actor in a Leading Role in a Drama – CBS Playhouse (Episode: "Do Not Go Gentle Into That Good Night")
- Tony Awards:
1. 1960: Best Leading Actor in a Play – The Best Man

=== Paul Scofield ===
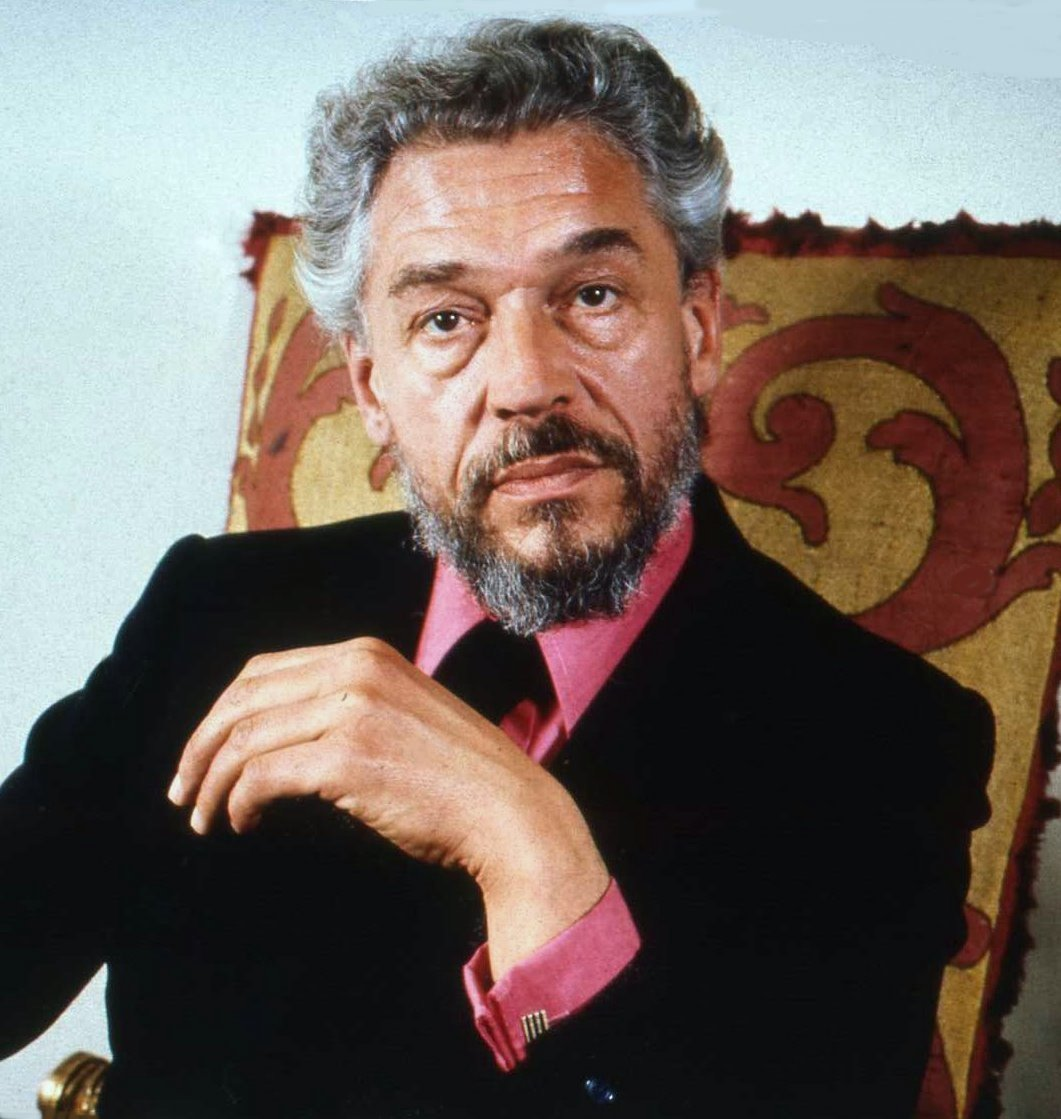
Paul Scofield (1974)

The English actor Paul Scofield (1922–2008) completed the triple crown in 1969. He was a two-time Oscar, one-time Emmy, and one-time Tony nominee, for a total of four TC nominations. Scofield won three awards over a span of seven years, making him the fastest TC recipient.

- Academy Awards:
1. 1967: Best Actor in a Leading Role – A Man for All Seasons
- Primetime Emmy Awards:
1. 1969: Outstanding Single Performance by an Actor in a Leading Role – Male of the Species
- Tony Awards:
1. 1962: Best Leading Actor in a Play – A Man for All Seasons

=== Jack Albertson ===
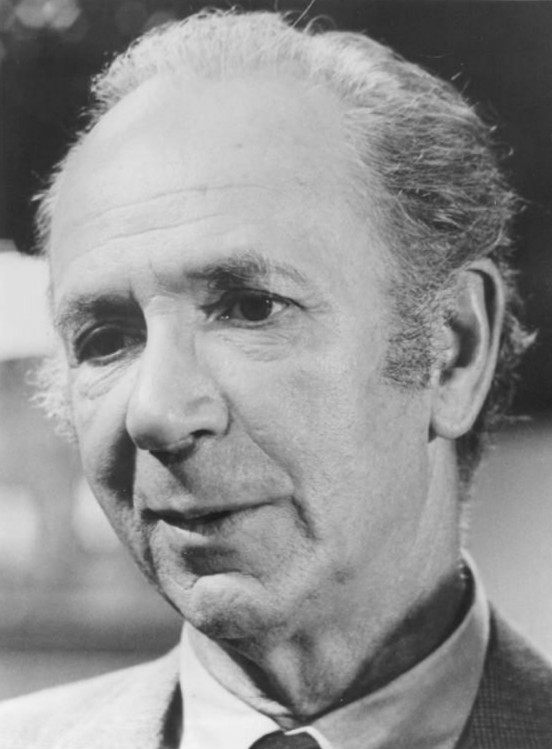
Jack Albertson (1971)

The American actor, comedian, dancer and singer Jack Albertson (1907–1981) completed the triple crown in 1975. He was a five-time Emmy, two-time Tony, and one-time Oscar nominee, for a total of eight TC nominations. Albertson won four awards.

- Academy Awards:
1. 1969: Best Actor in a Supporting Role – The Subject Was Roses
- Primetime Emmy Awards:
1. 1975: Outstanding Continuing or Single Performance by a Supporting Actor in Variety or Music – Cher
2. 1976: Outstanding Lead Actor in a Comedy Series – Chico and the Man
- Tony Awards:
1. 1965: Best Supporting or Featured Actor in a Play – The Subject Was Roses

=== Rita Moreno ===
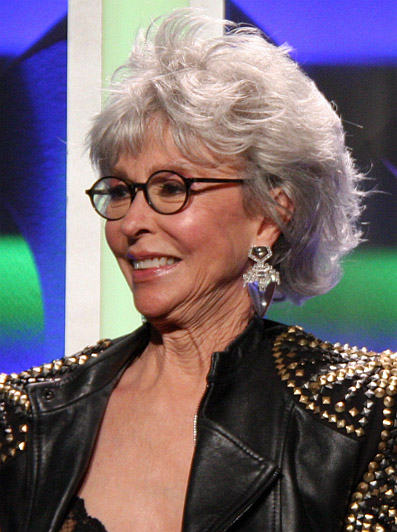
Rita Moreno (2014)

The Puerto Rican actress, dancer, and singer Rita Moreno (born 1931) completed the triple crown in 1977. She is a six-time Emmy, one-time Oscar, and one-time Tony nominee, for a total of eight TC nominations. Moreno has won 4 TC qualifying awards. She is the first Hispanic actor to achieve the triple crown. Moreno also won a Grammy in 1973 for Best Recording for Children to complete the EGOT. She is one of only three Triple Crown winners (along with Helen Hayes and Viola Davis) to have also achieved EGOT status.

- Academy Awards:
1. 1962: Best Actress in a Supporting Role – West Side Story
- Primetime Emmy Awards:
1. 1977: Outstanding Continuing or Single Performance by a Supporting Actress in Variety or Music – The Muppet Show (Episode: "Rita Moreno")
2. 1978: Outstanding Lead Actress for a Single Appearance in a Comedy or Drama Series – The Rockford Files (Episode: "The Paper Palace")
- Tony Awards:
1. 1975: Best Supporting or Featured Actress in a Play – The Ritz

=== Maureen Stapleton ===
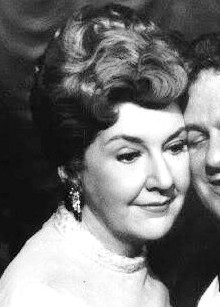
Maureen Stapleton (1975)

The American actress Maureen Stapleton (1925–2006) completed the triple crown in 1982. She was a seven-time Emmy, six-time Tony, and four-time Oscar nominee, for a total of 17 nominations. Stapleton won four awards.

- Academy Awards:
1. 1982: Best Actress in a Supporting Role – Reds
- Primetime Emmy Awards:
1. 1968: Outstanding Single Performance by an Actress in a Leading Role in a Drama – Among the Paths to Eden
- Tony Awards:
1. 1951: Best Supporting or Featured Actress in a Play – The Rose Tattoo
2. 1971: Best Leading Actress in a Play – The Gingerbread Lady

=== Jason Robards ===
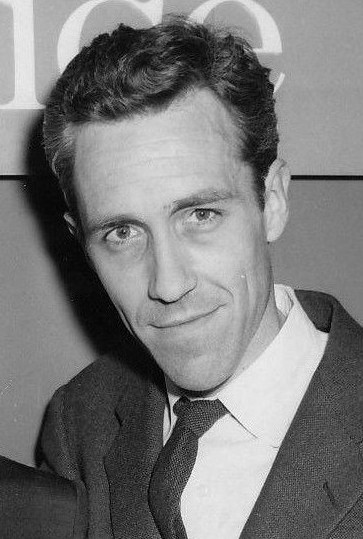
Jason Robards (1956)

The American actor Jason Robards (1922–2000) completed the triple crown in 1988. He was an eight-time Tony, five-time Emmy, and three-time Oscar nominee, for a total of 16 TC nominations. Robards won four awards.

- Academy Awards:
1. 1977: Best Actor in a Supporting Role – All the President's Men
2. 1978: Best Actor in a Supporting Role – Julia
- Primetime Emmy Awards:
1. 1988: Outstanding Lead Actor in a Miniseries or a Special – Inherit the Wind
- Tony Awards:
1. 1959: Best Leading Actor in a Play – The Disenchanted

=== Jessica Tandy ===
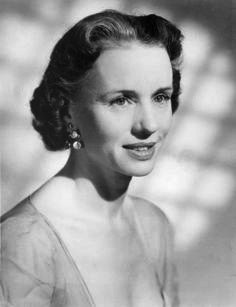
Jessica Tandy (c. 1950s)

The British-American actress Jessica Tandy (1909–1994) completed the triple crown in 1990. She was a five-time Tony, three-time Emmy, and two-time Oscar nominee, for a total of 10 TC nominations. Tandy won five awards.

- Academy Awards:
1. 1990: Best Actress in a Leading Role – Driving Miss Daisy
- Primetime Emmy Awards:
1. 1988: Outstanding Lead Actress in a Miniseries or Special – Foxfire
- Tony Awards:
1. 1947: Best Actress in a Play – A Streetcar Named Desire
2. 1978: Best Leading Actress in a Play – The Gin Game
3. 1983: Best Leading Actress in a Play – Foxfire

=== Jeremy Irons ===
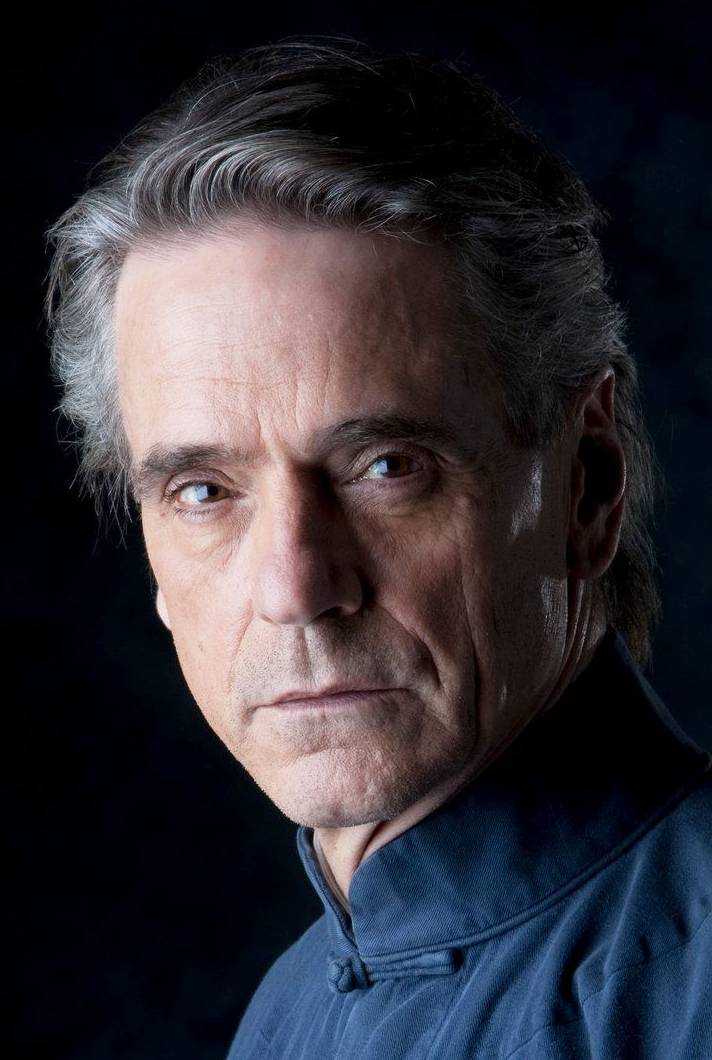
Jeremy Irons (2014)

The English actor and activist Jeremy Irons (born 1948) completed the triple crown in 1997. He is a three-time Emmy, one-time Oscar, and one-time Tony nominee, for a total of five TC nominations. Irons has won four TC awards.

- Academy Awards:
1. 1991: Best Actor in a Leading Role – Reversal of Fortune
- Primetime Emmy Awards:
1. 1997: Outstanding Voice-Over Performance – The Great War and the Shaping of the 20th Century
2. 2006: Outstanding Supporting Actor in a Miniseries or a Movie – Elizabeth I
- Tony Awards:
1. 1984: Best Leading Actor in a Play – The Real Thing

Note: Irons has an additional Emmy win in a non-acting category, winning the Primetime Emmy Award for Outstanding Narrator in 2014 for Game of Lions.

=== Anne Bancroft ===
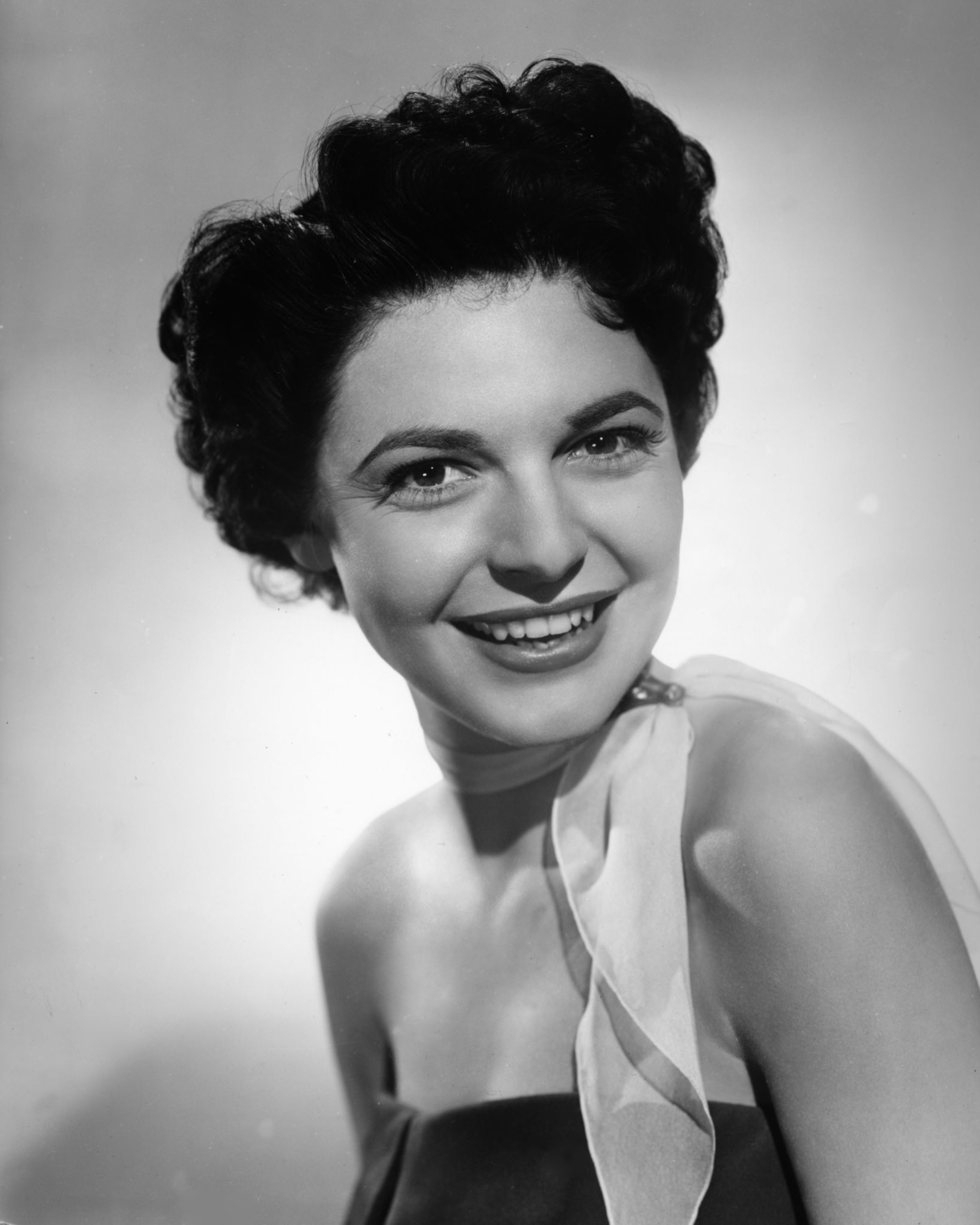
Anne Bancroft (1952)

The American actress Anne Bancroft (1931–2005) completed the triple crown in 1999. She was a six-time Emmy, five-time Oscar, and three-time Tony nominee, for a total of 14 TC nominations. Bancroft won four awards.

- Academy Awards:
1. 1963: Best Actress in a Leading Role – The Miracle Worker
- Primetime Emmy Awards:
1. 1999: Outstanding Supporting Actress in a Miniseries or a Movie – Deep in My Heart
- Tony Awards:
1. 1958: Best Supporting or Featured Actress in a Play – Two for the Seesaw
2. 1960: Best Leading Actress in a Play – The Miracle Worker

Note: Bancroft won an additional Emmy in 1970 in the category Outstanding Variety or Musical Program – Variety and Popular Music, as the star of the special Annie, the Women in the Life of a Man.

=== Vanessa Redgrave ===
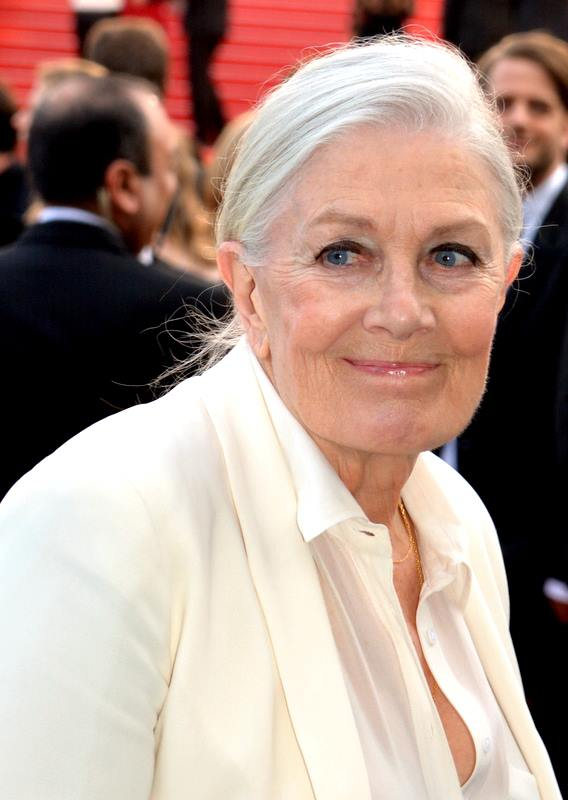
Vanessa Redgrave (2016)

The English actress and activist Vanessa Redgrave (born 1937) completed the triple crown in 2003. She is a six-time Oscar, six-time Emmy, and three-time Tony nominee, for a total of 15 TC nominations. Redgrave has won four TC qualifying awards.

- Academy Awards:
1. 1978: Best Actress in a Supporting Role – Julia
- Primetime Emmy Awards:
1. 1981: Outstanding Lead Actress in a Limited Series or a Special – Playing for Time
2. 2000: Outstanding Supporting Actress in a Miniseries or a Movie – If These Walls Could Talk 2
- Tony Awards:
1. 2003: Best Leading Actress in a Play – Long Day's Journey into Night

=== Maggie Smith ===
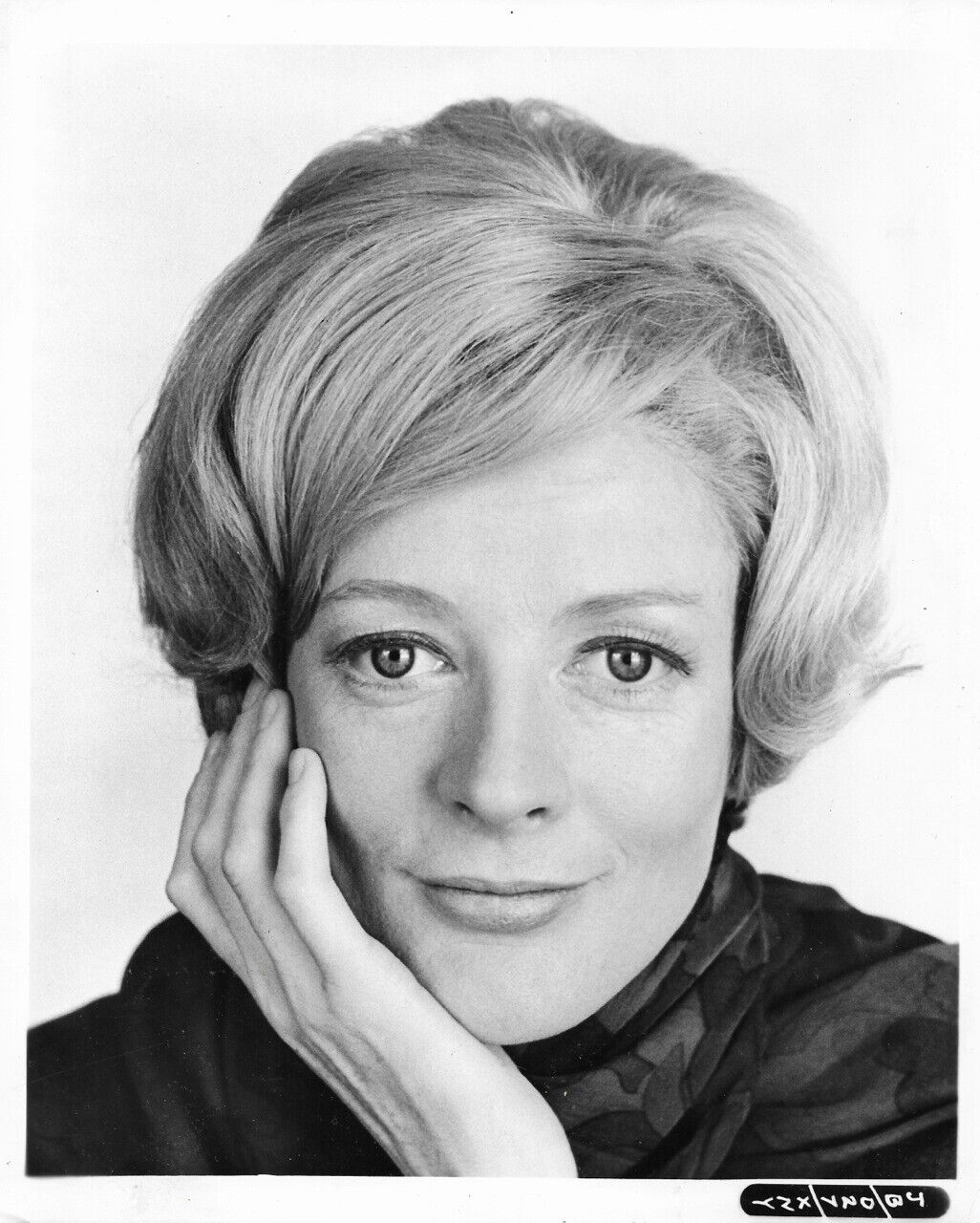
Maggie Smith (c. 1970)

The English actress Maggie Smith (1934–2024) completed the triple crown in 2003. She was a nine-time Emmy, six-time Oscar, and three-time Tony nominee, for a total of 18 TC nominations. Smith was the first and only triple crown winner to win seven TC awards.

- Academy Awards:
1. 1970: Best Actress in a Leading Role – The Prime of Miss Jean Brodie
2. 1979: Best Actress in a Supporting Role – California Suite
- Primetime Emmy Awards:
1. 2003: Outstanding Lead Actress in a Miniseries or Movie – My House in Umbria
2. 2011: Outstanding Supporting Actress in a Miniseries or a Movie – Downton Abbey
3. 2012: Outstanding Supporting Actress in a Drama Series – Downton Abbey
4. 2016: Outstanding Supporting Actress in a Drama Series – Downton Abbey
- Tony Awards:
1. 1990: Best Leading Actress in a Play – Lettice and Lovage

=== Al Pacino ===
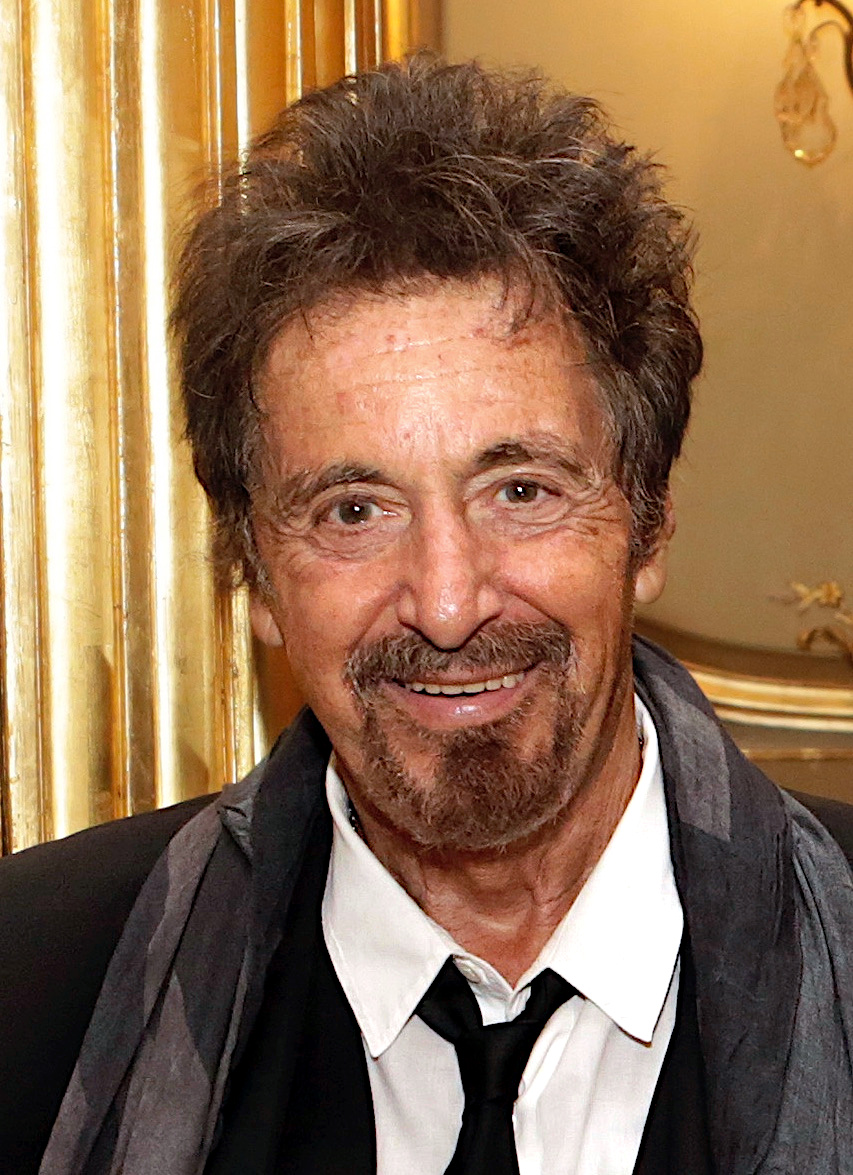
Al Pacino (2016)

The American actor Al Pacino (born 1940) completed the triple crown in 2004. He is a nine-time Oscar, three-time Emmy, and three-time Tony nominee, for a total of 15 TC nominations. Pacino has won five TC awards.

- Academy Awards:
1. 1993: Best Actor in a Leading Role – Scent of a Woman
- Primetime Emmy Awards:
1. 2004: Outstanding Lead Actor in a Miniseries or a Movie – Angels in America
2. 2010: Outstanding Lead Actor in a Miniseries or a Movie – You Don't Know Jack
- Tony Awards:
1. 1969: Best Supporting or Featured Actor in a Play – Does a Tiger Wear a Necktie?
2. 1977: Best Leading Actor in a Play – The Basic Training of Pavlo Hummel

=== Geoffrey Rush ===
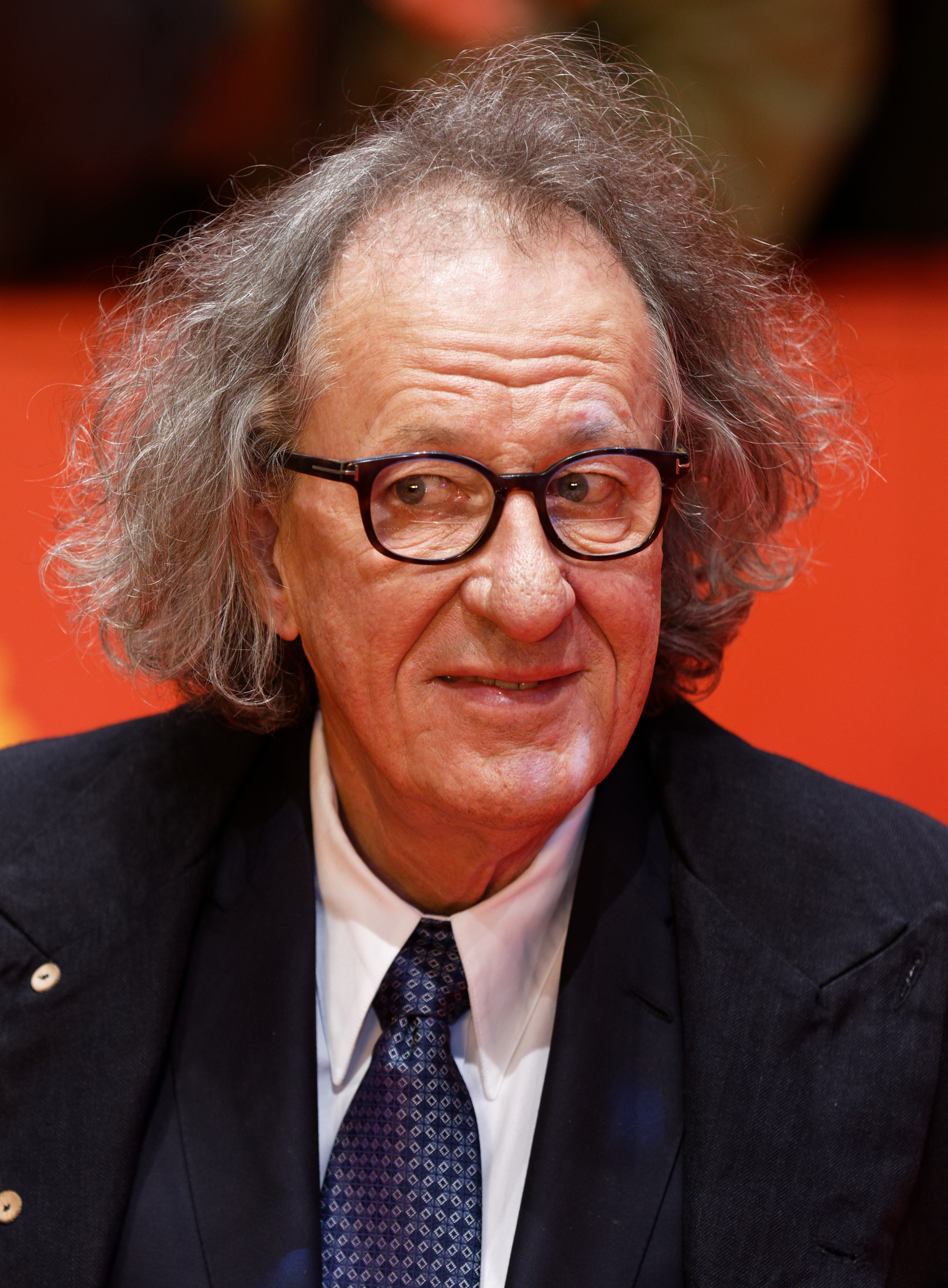
Geoffrey Rush (2017)

The Australian actor Geoffrey Rush (born 1951) completed the triple crown in 2009. He is a four-time Oscar, two-time Emmy, and one-time Tony nominee, for a total of seven TC nominations. Rush has won three TC awards.

- Academy Awards:
1. 1997: Best Actor in a Leading Role – Shine
- Primetime Emmy Awards:
1. 2005: Outstanding Lead Actor in a Miniseries or a Movie – The Life and Death of Peter Sellers
- Tony Awards:
1. 2009: Best Leading Actor in a Play – Exit the King

=== Ellen Burstyn ===
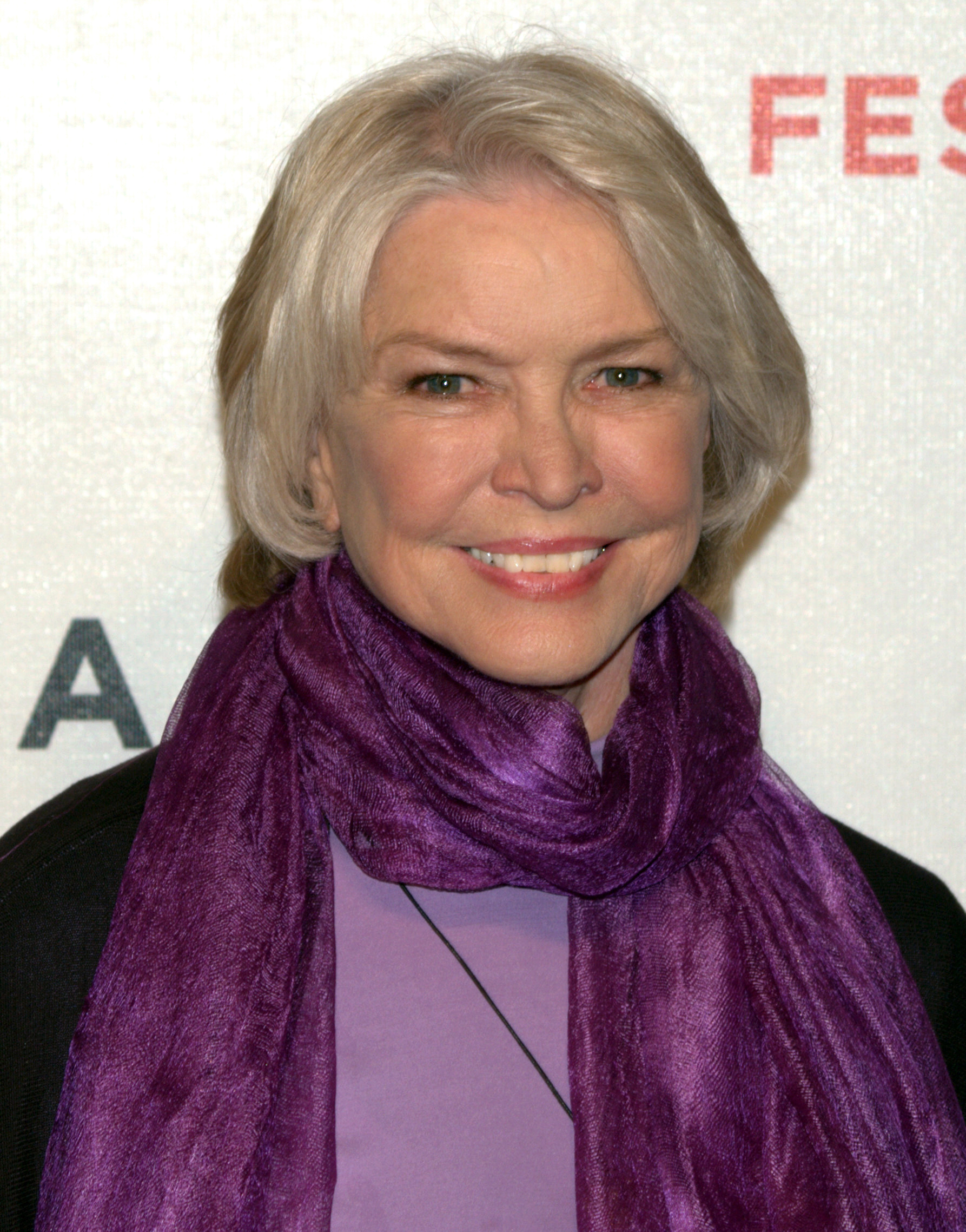
Ellen Burstyn (2009)

The American actress Ellen Burstyn (born 1932) completed the triple crown in 2009. She is an eight-time Emmy, six-time Oscar, and one-time Tony nominee, for a total of 15 TC nominations. Burstyn has won four TC awards.

- Academy Awards:
1. 1975: Best Actress in a Leading Role – Alice Doesn't Live Here Anymore
- Primetime Emmy Awards:
1. 2009: Outstanding Guest Actress in a Drama Series – Law & Order: Special Victims Unit (Episode: "Swing")
2. 2013: Outstanding Supporting Actress in a Miniseries or Movie – Political Animals
- Tony Awards:
1. 1975: Best Leading Actress in a Play – Same Time, Next Year

=== Christopher Plummer ===
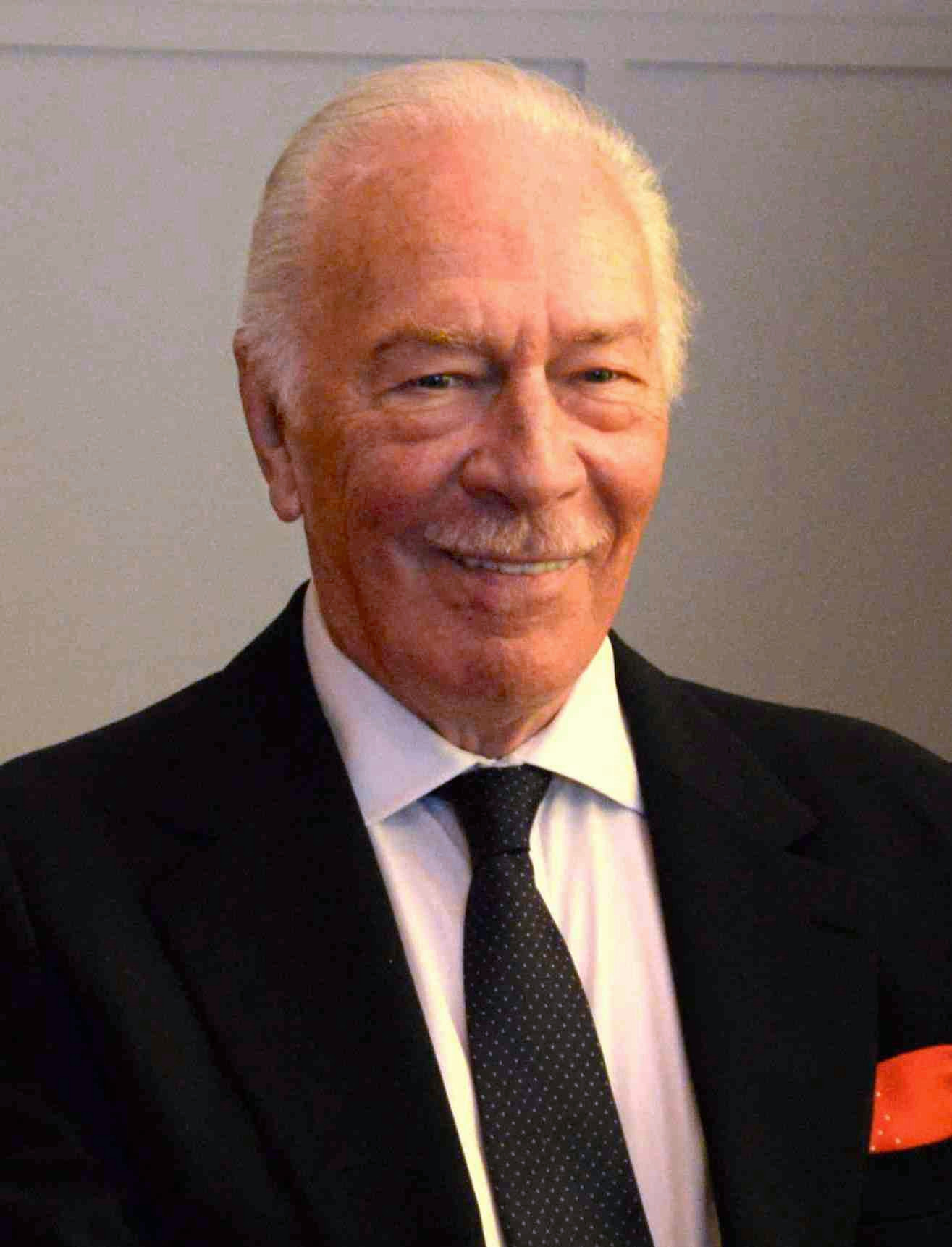
Christopher Plummer (2014)

The Canadian actor Christopher Plummer (1929–2021) completed the triple crown in 2012. He was a seven-time Emmy, six-time Tony, and three-time Oscar nominee, for a total of 17 TC nominations. Plummer won five awards. With his Oscar win in 2012, 82-year-old Plummer became the oldest person to complete the triple crown.

- Academy Awards:
1. 2012: Best Actor in a Supporting Role – Beginners
- Primetime Emmy Awards:
1. 1977: Outstanding Lead Actor in a Limited Series – The Moneychangers
2. 1994: Outstanding Voice-Over Performance – Madeline
- Tony Awards:
1. 1974: Best Leading Actor in a Musical – Cyrano
2. 1997: Best Leading Actor in a Play – Barrymore

=== Helen Mirren ===
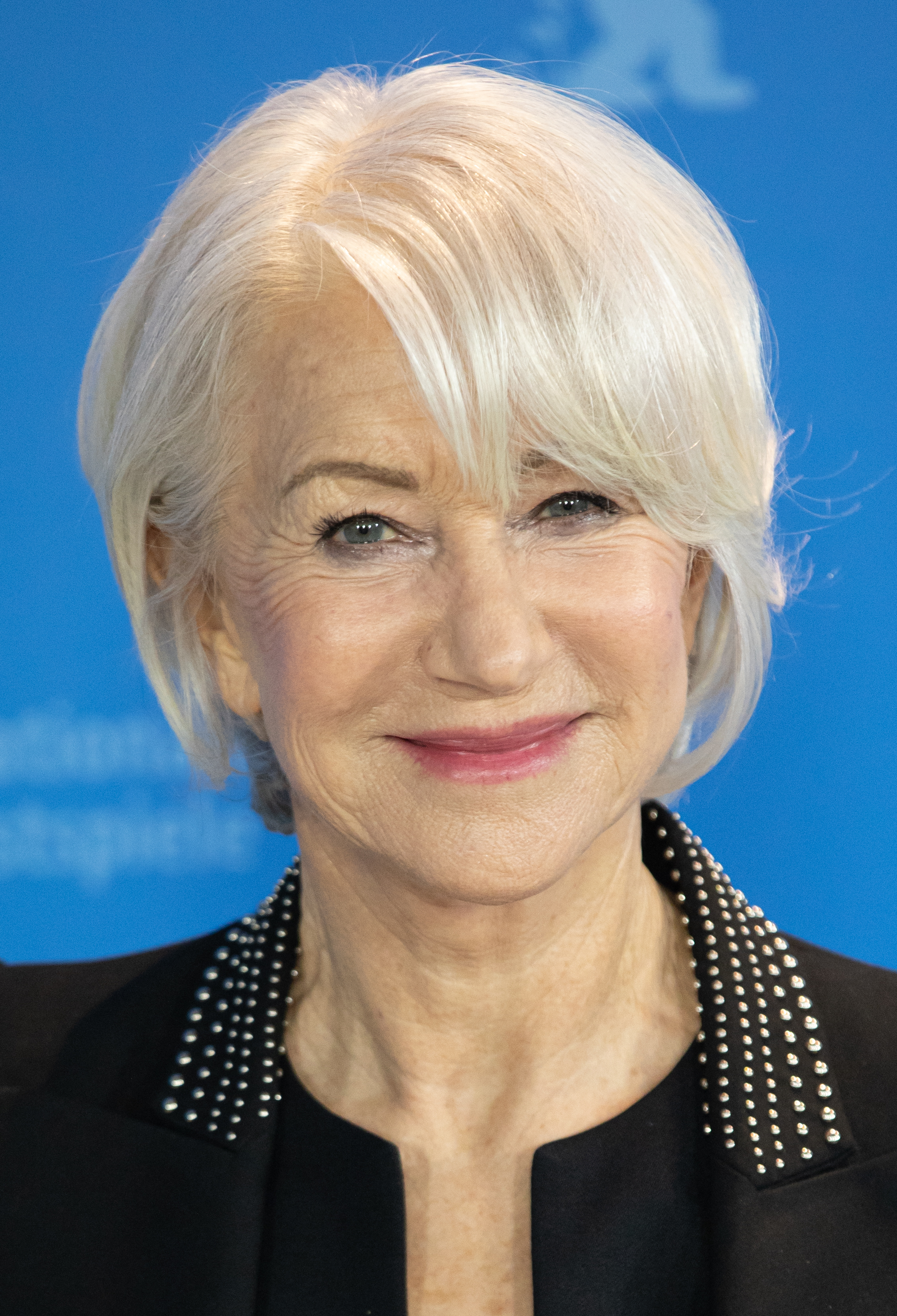
Helen Mirren (2020)

The English actress Helen Mirren (born 1945) completed the triple crown in 2015. She is an 11-time Emmy, four-time Oscar, and three-time Tony nominee, for a total of 18 TC nominations. Mirren has won six TC awards.

- Academy Awards:
1. 2007: Best Actress in a Leading Role – The Queen
- Primetime Emmy Awards:
1. 1996: Outstanding Lead Actress in a Miniseries or a Special – Prime Suspect: The Scent of Darkness
2. 1999: Outstanding Lead Actress in a Miniseries or a Movie – The Passion of Ayn Rand
3. 2006: Outstanding Lead Actress in a Miniseries or a Movie – Elizabeth I
4. 2007: Outstanding Lead Actress in a Miniseries or a Movie – Prime Suspect: The Final Act
- Tony Awards:
1. 2015: Best Leading Actress in a Play – The Audience

Note: Mirren has an additional Emmy win in a non-acting category, winning the Children's and Family Emmy Award for Outstanding Host in 2022 for Harry Potter: Hogwarts Tournament of Houses.

=== Frances McDormand ===
Frances McDormand (2015)

The American actress and producer Frances McDormand (born 1957) completed the triple crown in 2015. She is a six-time Oscar, two-time Tony, and two-time acting Emmy nominee, for a total of 10 TC nominations. McDormand has won five TC awards.

- Academy Awards:
1. 1997: Best Actress in a Leading Role – Fargo
2. 2018: Best Actress in a Leading Role – Three Billboards Outside Ebbing, Missouri
3. 2021: Best Actress in a Leading Role – Nomadland
- Primetime Emmy Awards:
1. 2015: Outstanding Lead Actress in a Limited Series or a Movie – Olive Kitteridge
- Tony Awards:
1. 2011: Best Leading Actress in a Play – Good People

Note: McDormand has two additional Emmy and Oscar wins in non-acting categories, winning the Primetime Emmy Award for Outstanding Limited Series for executive producing Olive Kitteridge, and the Academy Award for Best Picture for producing Nomadland.

=== Jessica Lange ===
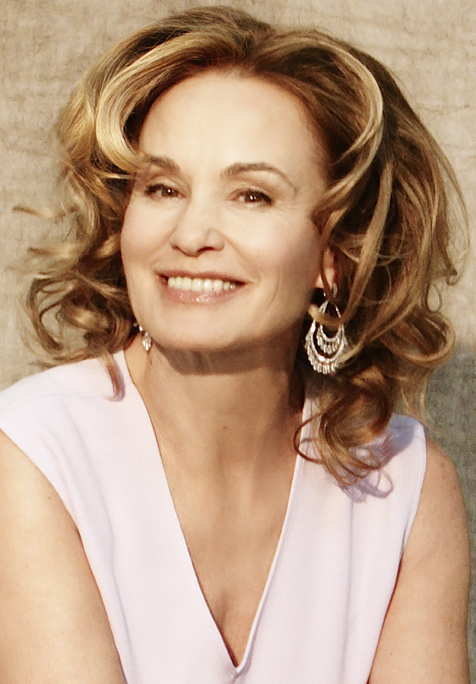
Jessica Lange (2008)

The American actress Jessica Lange (born 1949) completed the triple crown in 2016. She is a ten-time Emmy, six-time Oscar, and two-time Tony nominee, for a total of 18 TC nominations. Lange has won six TC awards.

- Academy Awards:
1. 1983: Best Actress in a Supporting Role – Tootsie
2. 1995: Best Actress in a Leading Role – Blue Sky
- Primetime Emmy Awards:
1. 2009: Outstanding Lead Actress in a Miniseries or a Movie – Grey Gardens
2. 2012: Outstanding Supporting Actress in a Miniseries or a Movie – American Horror Story: Murder House
3. 2014: Outstanding Lead Actress in a Miniseries or a Movie – American Horror Story: Coven
- Tony Awards:
1. 2016: Best Leading Actress in a Play – Long Day's Journey into Night

=== Viola Davis ===
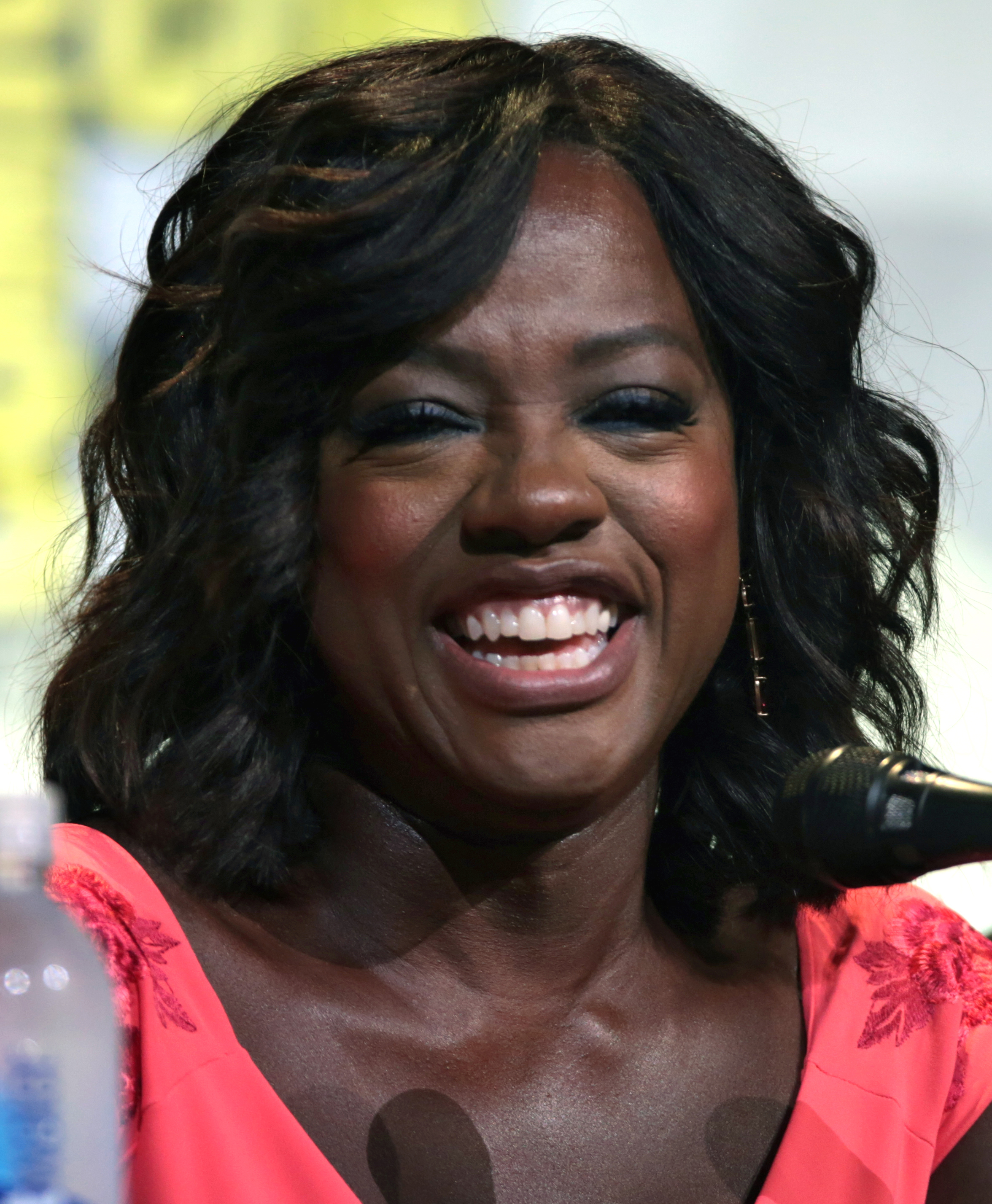
Viola Davis (2016)

The American actress and producer Viola Davis (born 1965) completed the triple crown in 2017. She is the first African American to achieve the triple crown. She is a four-time Oscar, three-time Tony, and five-time Emmy nominee, for a total of 12 TC nominations. Davis has won four TC awards. She also won a Grammy in 2023 for Best Audio Book, Narration & Storytelling Recording to complete the EGOT. Davis is one of only three Triple Crown winners (along with Helen Hayes and Rita Moreno) to have also achieved EGOT status.

- Academy Awards:
1. 2017: Best Actress in a Supporting Role – Fences
- Primetime Emmy Awards:
1. 2015: Outstanding Lead Actress in a Drama Series – How to Get Away with Murder
- Tony Awards:
1. 2001: Best Featured Actress in a Play – King Hedley II
2. 2010: Best Leading Actress in a Play – Fences

=== Glenda Jackson ===
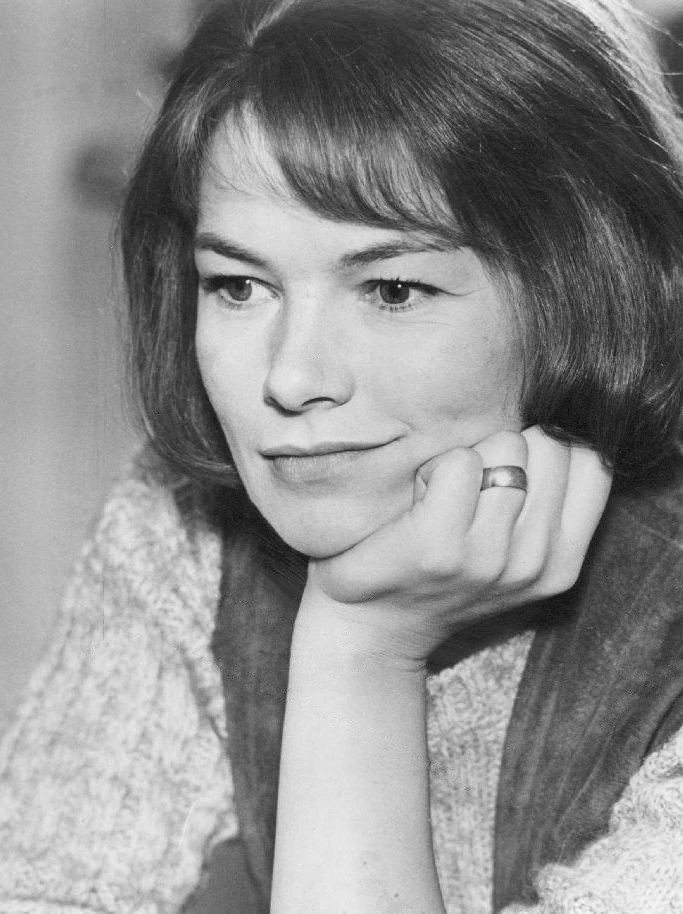
Glenda Jackson (1971)

The English actress and former Member of Parliament Glenda Jackson (1936–2023) completed the triple crown in 2018. She was a five-time Tony, five-time Emmy, and four-time Oscar nominee, for a total of 14 TC nominations. Jackson won six awards over a 48 year span, the longest of any triple crown recipient.

- Academy Awards:
1. 1971: Best Actress in a Leading Role – Women in Love
2. 1974: Best Actress in a Leading Role – A Touch of Class
- Primetime Emmy Awards:
1. 1972: Outstanding Single Performance by an Actress in a Leading Role – Elizabeth R
2. 1972: Outstanding Continued Performance by an Actress in a Leading Role in a Dramatic Series – Elizabeth R
- International Emmy Awards:
1. 2020: Best Performance by an Actress – Elizabeth Is Missing
- Tony Awards:
1. 2018: Best Leading Actress in a Play – Three Tall Women

== Two competitive awards ==
The following people have each won two out of the three major entertainment awards that honor acting in competitive categories.

=== Missing an Academy Award ===
1. Jane Alexander^{◊}
2. Mary Alice^{†}
3. Judith Anderson^{†◊}
4. Bea Arthur^{†}
5. Christine Baranski
6. Ellen Barkin
7. Gertrude Berg^{†}
8. Philip Bosco^{3} ^{†}
9. Pamela Brown^{†}
10. David Burns^{†}
11. Nell Carter^{†}
12. Stockard Channing^{◊}
13. Kristin Chenoweth
14. Glenn Close^{◊✼}
15. Jodie Comer
16. James Corden
17. Bryan Cranston^{◊}
18. Darren Criss
19. Hume Cronyn^{†◊}
20. Billy Crudup
21. Tyne Daly
22. Blythe Danner
23. André De Shields
24. Colleen Dewhurst^{†}
25. Stephen Dillane^{4}
26. Nanette Fabray^{†}
27. Laurence Fishburne^{◊}
28. Ed Flanders^{†}
29. Helen Gallagher^{3} ^{†}
30. Vincent Gardenia^{†◊}
31. George Grizzard^{†}
32. Julie Harris^{†◊}
33. Neil Patrick Harris
34. Rosemary Harris^{◊}
35. Sean Hayes
36. George Hearn
37. Edward Herrmann^{†}
38. Gregory Hines^{3} ^{†}
39. Judd Hirsch^{◊}
40. Hal Holbrook ^{†◊}
41. Ken Howard^{†}
42. Barnard Hughes^{†}
43. Hugh Jackman^{◊}
44. Derek Jacobi
45. Michael Jeter^{†}
46. Cherry Jones
47. James Earl Jones^{†◊✼}
48. Madeline Kahn^{3} ^{†◊}
49. Shirley Knight^{†◊}
50. Richard Kiley^{†}
51. Swoosie Kurtz
52. Nathan Lane
53. Anthony LaPaglia
54. John Larroquette
55. Ron Leibman^{†}
56. Margaret Leighton^{†◊}
57. Judith Light
58. John Lithgow^{◊}
59. Cleavon Little^{†}
60. Alfred Lunt^{†◊}
61. Mary Martin^{†}
62. Roddy McDowall^{†}
63. Laurie Metcalf^{◊}
64. Bette Midler^{◊}
65. Debra Monk
66. Michael Moriarty
67. Robert Morse^{†}
68. Donna Murphy^{3}
69. Bebe Neuwirth
70. Cynthia Nixon
71. Mary-Louise Parker
72. Mandy Patinkin
73. Sarah Paulson
74. David Hyde Pierce
75. Amanda Plummer
76. Billy Porter
77. Diana Rigg^{†}
78. Tony Shalhoub
79. Phil Silvers^{†}
80. Sarah Snook
81. Jeremy Strong^{◊}
82. Lily Tomlin^{◊}
83. Cicely Tyson^{†◊✼}
84. Dick Van Dyke
85. Courtney B. Vance
86. Eli Wallach^{†✼}
87. Jeffrey Wright^{◊}

=== Missing an Emmy Award ===
1. Alan Arkin^{†◊}
2. Martin Balsam^{†◊}
3. Ed Begley^{†◊}
4. Yul Brynner^{†}
5. Judi Dench^{◊}
6. Sandy Dennis^{†}
7. José Ferrer^{†◊}
8. Henry Fonda^{†◊}
9. Joel Grey^{◊}
10. Alec Guinness^{†◊}
11. Marcia Gay Harden^{◊}
12. Rex Harrison^{†}
13. Audrey Hepburn^{†}^{1}
14. Judy Holliday^{†}
15. Lila Kedrova^{†}
16. Kevin Kline^{◊}
17. Vivien Leigh^{†}
18. Fredric March^{†◊}
19. Walter Matthau^{†◊}
20. Liza Minnelli^{1}
21. Paul Muni^{†◊}
22. Patricia Neal^{†◊}
23. Eddie Redmayne
24. Anne Revere^{†}
25. Mercedes Ruehl
26. Mark Rylance^{◊}
27. Kevin Spacey^{◊}
28. Beatrice Straight^{†◊}
29. Jo Van Fleet^{†}
30. Denzel Washington^{2}
31. Catherine Zeta-Jones^{◊}

=== Missing a Tony Award ===
1. Julie Andrews^{◊}
2. Patricia Arquette
3. Kathy Bates^{◊}
4. Halle Berry
5. Marlon Brando^{†}
6. Jim Broadbent^{4}
7. Art Carney^{†◊}
8. Olivia Colman
9. Kieran Culkin
10. Jamie Lee Curtis
11. Bette Davis^{†}
12. Laura Dern
13. Michael Douglas
14. Patty Duke^{†}
15. Faye Dunaway
16. Robert Duvall^{†}
17. Sally Field^{◊}
18. Jane Fonda^{◊}
19. Jodie Foster
20. John Gielgud^{5} ^{†◊✼}
21. Ruth Gordon^{†◊}
22. Louis Gossett Jr.^{†}
23. Lee Grant
24. Anne Hathaway
25. Eileen Heckart^{†◊✼}
26. Katharine Hepburn^{†◊}
27. Dustin Hoffman^{◊}
28. William Holden^{†}
29. Anthony Hopkins
30. Helen Hunt
31. Holly Hunter
32. Allison Janney^{◊}
33. Nicole Kidman
34. Regina King
35. Cloris Leachman^{†}
36. Tommy Lee Jones
37. Melissa Leo
38. Jack Lemmon^{†◊}
39. Karl Malden^{†}
40. Rami Malek
41. Julianne Moore
42. Paul Newman^{†◊}
43. Lupita Nyong'o^{3},^{◊}
44. Laurence Olivier^{†◊}
45. Geraldine Page^{†◊}
46. Jack Palance^{†}
47. Gwyneth Paltrow
48. Cliff Robertson^{†}
49. Eva Marie Saint
50. George C. Scott^{†◊}
51. Simone Signoret^{†}
52. Meryl Streep^{◊}
53. Emma Thompson
54. Claire Trevor^{†}
55. Peter Ustinov^{†◊}
56. Dianne Wiest
57. Robin Williams^{†}
58. Kate Winslet
59. Shelley Winters^{†}
60. Joanne Woodward
61. Loretta Young^{†}

=== Notes ===
- † – Person is deceased.
- ◊ – Person has been nominated at least once, but has failed to win.
- ✼ – Person won a non-competitive award.

^1Won an Emmy in a non-acting category.
^2Nominated for an Emmy in a non-acting category.
^3Won a Daytime Emmy.
^4Won an International Emmy.
^5Won a Tony in a non-acting category.

== Three nominations ==
The following people have not won all three awards in competitive acting categories, but have received at least one nomination for each of them:

1. Alan Alda
2. Jane Alexander
3. Joan Allen
4. Judith Anderson^{†}
5. Julie Andrews
6. Alan Arkin^{†}
7. Lauren Bacall^{†}
8. Alec Baldwin
9. Martin Balsam^{†}
10. Antonio Banderas^{✧}
11. Barbara Barrie^{†}^{✧}
12. Kathy Bates
13. Ed Begley^{†}
14. Ralph Bellamy^{†}
15. Annette Bening^{✧}
16. Cate Blanchett
17. Joan Blondell^{†✧}
18. Charles Boyer^{†✧}
19. Richard Burton^{†}
20. Rose Byrne^{✧}
21. Diahann Carroll^{†}
22. Art Carney^{†}
23. Stockard Channing
24. Jessica Chastain
25. Patricia Clarkson
26. George Clooney
27. Glenn Close
28. James Coco^{†}
29. Claudette Colbert^{†}
30. Toni Collette
31. Chris Cooper
32. Gladys Cooper^{†✧}
33. Tom Courtenay^{✧}
34. Bryan Cranston
35. Hume Cronyn^{†}
36. Judi Dench
37. Colman Domingo
38. Adam Driver^{✧}
39. Charles Durning^{†}
40. Cynthia Erivo
41. José Ferrer^{†}
42. Sally Field
43. Ralph Fiennes
44. Albert Finney^{†}
45. Laurence Fishburne
46. Henry Fonda^{†}
47. Jane Fonda
48. Morgan Freeman
49. Vincent Gardenia^{†}
50. Andrew Garfield
51. John Gielgud^{†}
52. Jack Gilford^{†}
53. Jackie Gleason^{†}
54. Ruth Gordon^{†}
55. Joel Grey
56. Alec Guinness^{†}
57. Jake Gyllenhaal^{✧}
58. Tom Hanks
59. Marcia Gay Harden
60. Ed Harris^{✧}
61. Julie Harris^{†}
62. Rosemary Harris
63. Eileen Heckart^{†}
64. Brian Tyree Henry^{✧}
65. Katharine Hepburn^{†}
66. Judd Hirsch
67. Dustin Hoffman
68. Philip Seymour Hoffman^{†}
69. Hal Holbrook^{†}
70. Ian Holm^{†}
71. Tom Hulce
72. William Hurt^{†}
73. Hugh Jackman
74. Allison Janney
75. James Earl Jones^{†}
76. Madeline Kahn^{†}
77. Diane Keaton^{†}
78. Anna Kendrick^{✧}
79. Kevin Kline
80. Shirley Knight^{†}
81. Angela Lansbury^{†}
82. Jude Law^{✧}
83. Eva Le Gallienne^{†}
84. Margaret Leighton^{†}
85. Jack Lemmon^{†}
86. Laura Linney
87. John Lithgow
88. Alfred Lunt^{†}
89. Lesley Manville
90. Fredric March^{†}
91. Walter Matthau^{†}
92. Ian McKellen
93. Janet McTeer
94. Laurie Metcalf
95. Bette Midler
96. Carey Mulligan^{✧}
97. Paul Muni^{†}
98. Mildred Natwick^{†}
99. Patricia Neal^{†}
100. Ruth Negga^{✧}
101. Kate Nelligan^{✧}
102. Paul Newman^{†}
103. Lupita Nyong'o
104. Leslie Odom Jr.
105. Sophie Okonedo
106. Laurence Olivier^{†}
107. Geraldine Page^{†}
108. Joan Plowright^{†}
109. Sidney Poitier^{†}
110. Jonathan Pryce
111. Anthony Quayle^{†}
112. Anthony Quinn^{†}
113. Da'Vine Joy Randolph
114. Stephen Rea^{✧}
115. Lynn Redgrave^{†✧}
116. John C. Reilly^{N/A}
117. Lee Remick^{†✧}
118. Debbie Reynolds^{†✧}
119. Beah Richards^{†}
120. Thelma Ritter^{†}
121. Sam Rockwell
122. Mickey Rooney^{†}
123. Mark Ruffalo
124. Mark Rylance
125. George C. Scott^{†}
126. Michael Shannon^{✧}
127. Gary Sinise
128. Kevin Spacey
129. Kim Stanley^{†}
130. Beatrice Straight^{†}
131. Meryl Streep
132. Jeremy Strong
133. Lily Tomlin
134. Rip Torn^{†}
135. Cicely Tyson^{†}
136. Stanley Tucci
137. Peter Ustinov^{†}
138. Christopher Walken
139. Sam Waterston^{✧}
140. Sigourney Weaver^{✧}
141. James Whitmore^{†}
142. Michelle Williams
143. Mare Winningham
144. Jeffrey Wright
145. Catherine Zeta-Jones

=== Notes ===
† – Person is deceased.
✧ – Person has not won any of the three awards (excluding non-acting awards and non-competitive awards).

== See also ==
- Academy Awards
- Emmy Awards
  - Children's and Family Emmy Awards
  - Daytime Emmy Awards
  - International Emmy Awards
  - Primetime Emmy Awards
- Tony Awards
- EGOT
