= Josh Harms =

American politician

Member of the Illinois House of Representatives from the 106th district
- In office January 2013 – January 2015
- Preceded by: Keith P. Sommer (redistricted)
- Succeeded by: Thomas M. Bennett

Personal details
- Born: October 7, 1973 (age 52) Watseka, Illinois
- Party: Republican
- Spouse: Rebecca Harms
- Children: Two
- Education: Governors State University; Illinois State University
- Profession: Teacher

Josh Harms is a former member of the Illinois House of Representatives as a representative for the 106th district from January 2013 to January 2015. This district includes all of Iroquois County and Ford County as well as parts of Vermillion, Livingston and Woodford counties in Central Illinois.

== Early life and teaching career ==
Josh grew up on his family's farm near Watseka, Illinois. After graduating from Watseka Community High School, he attended Illinois State University where he received a Bachelor of Arts in music education. While working as a teacher at the Iroquois Special Education Association, he earned a Master of Arts from Governors State University.

== Illinois General Assembly ==
=== Campaign ===
In June 2011, Harms announced his intention to run for the state representative in the new 106th district. During the primary election he was endorsed by Illinois State Representative Roger Eddy and retired Illinois State Representative William Black On election day, Harms won 33% of ballots cast in a five way primary that included the Chairman of the Parkland College Board of Trustees, Tom Bennett and former Mayor of Pontiac Scott McCoy to secure the nomination. Harms was unopposed in the general election as no Democratic candidate filed to run in the historically Republican area. After winning the election unopposed, Harms resigned from his teaching position to become a full-time legislator.

=== Tenure ===
Committee Assignments, 98th General Assembly
- Agriculture & Conservation
- Appropriations-Higher Education
- Business Occupational Licenses
- Cities & Villages
- Public Safety: Police & Fire Committee
- Economic Development
- Veterans' Affairs.

When Representative Harms was sworn into office in January 2013, he joined a bipartisan group of 21 other lawmakers who chose not to take a legislative pension.

During the spring session of the 98th General Assembly, four of the ten bills he sponsored were signed into law by Governor Pat Quinn.

His first bill, sponsored with his associated Senator Jason Barickman, amended the Illinois Finance Authority Act to require the next two appointees to the Illinois Finance Authority have agribusiness experience and that the Authority must have at least two members with such experience.

The second, which was signed into law four days after the first, mandates that if a mobile home park owner knows from law enforcement that a mobile home has been used for the manufacture of methamphetamine then the information must be disclosed to the potential home buyer. The third involving the Illinois Marriage and Dissolution of Marriage Act, to give parents with joint-custody the right of first refusal in the case where one parent needs to leave a child with a substitute child care provider for a significant period to lessen kids being used against the first parent. The final bill allowed for veterans to have the requirement for an associate degree to enter law enforcement waived if they served for 24 months of honorable active duty to better enable veterans to enter the job market.

In late June, Harms decided to retire and remove himself from the ballot for the 2014 general election citing a desire to return to teaching and spend more time with his family. He has announced that he will serve out the remainder of his term. A committee of party officials from Iroquois, Ford, Vermillion, Livingston and Woodford counties will select his replacement on the ballot by a weighted vote based on the number of Republican primary ballots pulled in each county during the 2014 Republican primary. Individuals speculated to replace Harms on the ballot include former State Senator Shane Cultra, Parkland College trustee and Ford County Republican Party chairman Tom Bennett and Susan Wynn Bence, an Iroquois County Board member who also is an aide to Harms. He was replaced on the ballot by Parkland College Trustee Tom Bennett. Bennett defeated Democratic candidate and Watseka City Council member William Nutter.

=== Election results ===
106th Representative District General Election, 2012
Party	Candidate	Votes	%
Republican	Josh Harms	38,516	100
Republican hold			

106th Representative District Republican Primary Election, 2012
Party	Candidate	Votes	%
Republican	Josh Harms	5,846	33.30
Republican	Tom Bennett	4,923	28.05
Republican	Scott McCoy	4,014	22.87
Republican	Brian Gabor	1,877	10.69
Republican	Richard Thomas	893	5.09
Total votes		17,553	100
