= Thomas M. Bennett =

Illinois politician

Tom Bennett
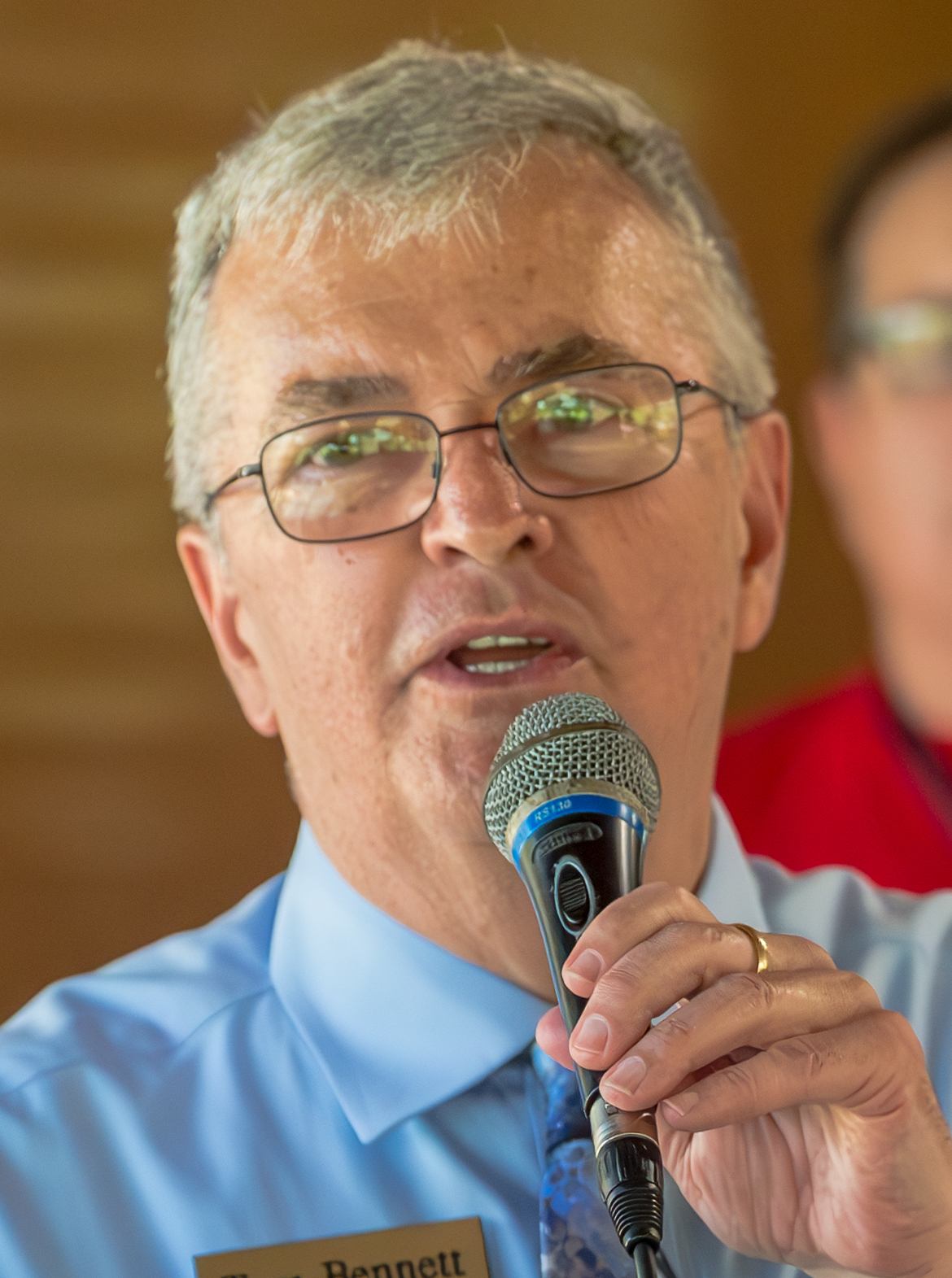
- Bennett saying words of encouragement and support prior to the balloon launch of a high-altitude weather balloon

Member of the Illinois Senate from the 53rd district
- In office January 11, 2023 – January 8, 2025
- Preceded by: Jason Barickman
- Succeeded by: Chris Balkema

Member of the Illinois House of Representatives from the 106th district
- In office January 14, 2015 – January 11, 2023
- Preceded by: Josh Harms
- Succeeded by: Jason Bunting

Chair of the Parkland College Board of Trustees
- In office April 18, 2012 – January 14, 2015
- Preceded by: James L. Ayers
- Succeeded by: Dana Trimble

Personal details
- Born: June 8, 1956 (age 70) Gibson City, Illinois, U.S.
- Party: Republican
- Relations: Scott M. Bennett (nephew)
- Education: Eastern Illinois University (BS); Illinois State University (BS, MBA); N.S.U. (D.B.A.)
- Profession: IT Manager; High School Teacher (former)
- Website: Senate website

Thomas Michael Bennett (born June 8, 1956) is a former Republican member of the Illinois Senate from the 53rd district. The 53rd district includes all or portions of Bureau, Ford, Grundy, Iroquois, LaSalle, Marshall, McLean, Peoria, Putnam, Tazewell, Will, and Woodford counties in central Illinois.

Prior to his appointment to the Illinois Senate, Bennett represented the 106th district in the Illinois House of Representatives and was Chairman of the Parkland College Board of Trustees.

== Early life and career ==
Bennett is a lifelong resident of Gibson City. He worked at State Farm for 30 years and was previously a teacher at Melvin-Sibley High School. Tom and his wife Kathy, a retired high school teacher, have two children and four grandchildren. His nephew, Scott M. Bennett, represented Champaign–Urbana. An elected member of the Parkland College Board of Trustees, Bennett became the board's chair taking over for James L. Ayers in April 2012. Bennett was succeeded in the role by Dana Trimble. In 2016, he was selected as an elector from Illinois's 16th congressional district who would have been pledged to Donald Trump and Mike Pence had they won Illinois's 20 electoral votes.

== Illinois House of Representatives ==
At the time, the 106th district included all or parts of Ford, Iroquois, Vermillion, Livingston and Woodford counties. During the 102nd General Assembly, Bennett was a member of the following Illinois House committees:

- Appropriations - Elementary & Secondary Education Committee (HAPE)
- Appropriations - Public Safety Committee (HAPP)
- Child Care Access & Early Child Access Committee (HCEC)
- Elementary & Secondary Education: School Curriculum & Policies (HELM)
- Law Enforcement Subcommittee (SHPF-LAWE)
- Police & Fire Committee (SHPF)

On January 28, 2020, Governor J.B. Prizker appointed Bennett to serve as a member of the Guardianship and Advocacy Commission for a term ending June 30, 2022. He was not confirmed during the 101st General Assembly and his appointment was carried over to the 102nd General Assembly for consideration.

== Illinois Senate ==
After the resignation of Jason Barickman, Bennett was appointed to succeed Barickman as Senator from the 53rd district for the 103rd General Assembly. Bennett did not run for reelection in the 2024 general election.

== Electoral history ==
2014 Illinois House of Representatives District 106 General Election
Party	Candidate	Votes	%
Republican	Tom Bennett	26,349	80.2
Democratic	William Nutter	6,516	19.8
Total votes		32,865	100.0

2016 Illinois House of Representatives District 106 General Election
Party	Candidate	Votes	%
Republican	Tom Bennett	41,047	100.0
Total votes		32,865	100.0

2018 Illinois House of Representatives District 106 General Election
Party	Candidate	Votes	%
Republican	Tom Bennett	32,952	100.0
Total votes		32,952	100.0

2020 Illinois House of Representatives District 106 General Election
Party	Candidate	Votes	%
Republican	Tom Bennett	45,477	100.0
Total votes		45,477	100.0

2022 Illinois House of Representatives District 106 General Election
Party	Candidate	Votes	%
Republican	Tom Bennett	34,652	100.0
Total votes		34,652	100.0
