= Champaign County Courthouse (Illinois) =

Coordinates: 40°6′44″N 88°12′25″W

The Champaign County Courthouse is the governmental center and courthouse of Champaign County, Illinois. Its court sessions hear cases in the 6th circuit of Illinois' Fifth District Appellate Court. The courthouse is part of a complex that also serves as the seat of Champaign County government. The county courthouse is located at 101 East Main Street in the county seat of Urbana.

== History ==
After Champaign County's creation in 1833, the county operated an 1836−1837 log cabin courthouse, an 1840 frame courthouse, and then an 1848−1849 Abraham Lincoln-era brick-sheathed frame courthouse. All of these courthouses disappeared with the construction of the 1900−1901 Old Courthouse, which survives as the heart of the modern Champaign County courthouse complex.

The Old Courthouse was designed by local Champaign-Urbana architect Joseph W. Royer. Constructed in the Romanesque Revival style with a 135-foot-tall clock tower, the $150,000 structure was intended to house all of the county's governmental functions and to serve as a visual centerpiece for the city of Urbana.

== Today ==
The Old Courthouse grew inadequate for urban courthouse use, and a large addition was built in 1996–2002. This addition contains most of the actual Champaign County courthouse functional space used by the 6th Circuit.

Other county functions also needed more space. A jail building was built across the street. In addition, Champaign County took over the former Norris L. Brookens Junior High School (1969−1970), at 1776 East Washington Street, non-adjacent to the courthouse, and began to use it as non-courthouse administrative office space.

Finally in the 2010s, the office of the Champaign County Sheriff asked for more space of its own, separate from the county jail. In 2022, the county bought space adjacent to the Courthouse and jail, and renovated it in 2023−2025 as the Scott M. Bennett Administrative Building. Nearly 200 sheriff's personnel and county officials, including personnel from the former Brookens location, began to move into the county administrative building in April 2025.
