= Stacy Bennett =

American politician

Member of the Illinois Senate from the 52nd district
- In office December 22, 2022 – January 11, 2023
- Preceded by: Scott M. Bennett
- Succeeded by: Paul Faraci

Personal details
- Party: Democratic
- Spouse: Scott M. Bennett (died. 2022)

Stacy Bennett is an American politician. She served as a Democratic member for the 52nd district of the Illinois Senate from December 2022 to January 2023.

== Life and career ==
Bennett is a member of the Democratic Party.

In 2022, Bennett was appointed by party leaders Mike Ingram and Sandra Lawlyes to represent the 52nd district of the Illinois Senate, following the death of her husband, Scott M. Bennett.
