= 5th Primetime Emmy Awards =

- Date: February 5, 1953
- Location: Hotel Statler, Los Angeles, California
- Presented by: Academy of Television Arts and Sciences
- Hosted by: Art Linkletter

Highlights
- Best Dramatic Program: Robert Montgomery Presents
- Best Situation Comedy: I Love Lucy
- Best Variety Program: Your Show of Shows

Television/radio coverage
- Network: KLAC

The 5th Emmy Awards, retroactively known as the 5th Primetime Emmy Awards after the debut of the Daytime Emmy Awards, were presented at the Hotel Statler in Los Angeles, California on February 5, 1953. The ceremonies were hosted by Art Linkletter.

== Winners and nominees ==
Winners are listed first, highlighted in boldface, and indicated with a double dagger (‡).

=== Programs ===
Programs
**Best Situation Comedy**: **I Love Lucy (CBS)**‡; The Adventures of Ozzie & Harriet (ABC); The Amos 'n Andy Show (CBS); The George Burns and Gracie Allen Show (CBS); Mister Peepers (NBC); Our Miss Brooks (CBS)	**Best Dramatic Program**: **Robert Montgomery Presents (NBC)**‡; Celanese Theatre (ABC); Goodyear Television Playhouse (NBC); Kraft Television Theatre (NBC); Studio One (CBS)
**Best Variety Program**: **Your Show of Shows (NBC)**‡; Arthur Godfrey and His Friends (CBS); The Colgate Comedy Hour (NBC); The Jackie Gleason Show (CBS); Toast of the Town (CBS)	**Best Audience Participation, Quiz or Panel Program**: **What's My Line? (CBS)**‡; Down You Go (DuMont); This Is Your Life (NBC); Two for the Money (NBC); You Bet Your Life (NBC)
**Best Mystery, Action or Adventure Program**: **Dragnet (NBC)**‡; The Big Story (NBC); Foreign Intrigue (Syndicated); Martin Kane, Private Eye (NBC); Racket Squad (NBC)	**Best Children's Program**: **Time for Beany (KTLA)**‡; Big Top (CBS); The Gabby Hayes Show (NBC); Kukla, Fran and Ollie (NBC); Puppet Playhouse (NBC); Super Circus (NBC); Zoo Parade (NBC)
**Best Public Affairs Program**: **See It Now (CBS)**‡; Camel News Caravan (NBC); Life Is Worth Living (DuMont); Meet the Press (NBC); Victory at Sea (NBC)

=== Acting ===
Acting
**Best Actor**: **Thomas Mitchell**‡; John Forsythe; Charlton Heston; John Newland; Vaughn Taylor; Jack Webb	**Best Actress**: **Helen Hayes**‡; Sarah Churchill; June Lockhart; Maria Riva; Peggy Wood

=== Hosting ===
Hosting
**Best Comedian**: **Jimmy Durante (NBC)**‡; Sid Caesar (NBC); Wally Cox (NBC); Jackie Gleason (CBS); Herb Shriner (ABC)	**Best Comedienne**: **Lucille Ball (CBS)**‡; Eve Arden (CBS); Imogene Coca (NBC); Joan Davis (NBC); Martha Raye (NBC)
**Most Outstanding Personality**: **Fulton J. Sheen (DuMont)**‡; Lucille Ball (CBS); Jimmy Durante (CBS); Arthur Godfrey (CBS); Edward R. Murrow (CBS); Donald O'Connor (NBC); Adlai Stevenson (NBC)
