= Sole Source Aquifer =

A Sole Source Aquifer (SSA) is an aquifer that has been designated by the United States Environmental Protection Agency (EPA) as the sole or principal source of drinking water for an area. By definition, SSA is an aquifer that supplies at least 50% of the drinking water consumed in the area overlying the aquifer. There may be other factors to designate SSA. For example, in New York City, Kings and Queens Counties are designated as SSA not because the aquifer of these areas are the sole or principal sources of drinking water for these counties; they are designated as SSA because the geographic boundaries of Kings and Queens Counties are within the recharge zone for the aquifers underlying the southeastern portion of Queens County. Groundwater beneath Manhattan and the Bronx is not used for drinking or non-potable purposes.

These areas may have no alternative drinking water source(s) that could physically, legally and economically supply all those who depend on the aquifer for drinking water and therefore, if contamination occurs, using an alternative source would be extremely expensive. SSA designation works as a tool to protect drinking water supplies in these areas.

== See also ==
- Aquifer
