= Scott M. Bennett =

American politician (1977–2022)

Scott Bennett
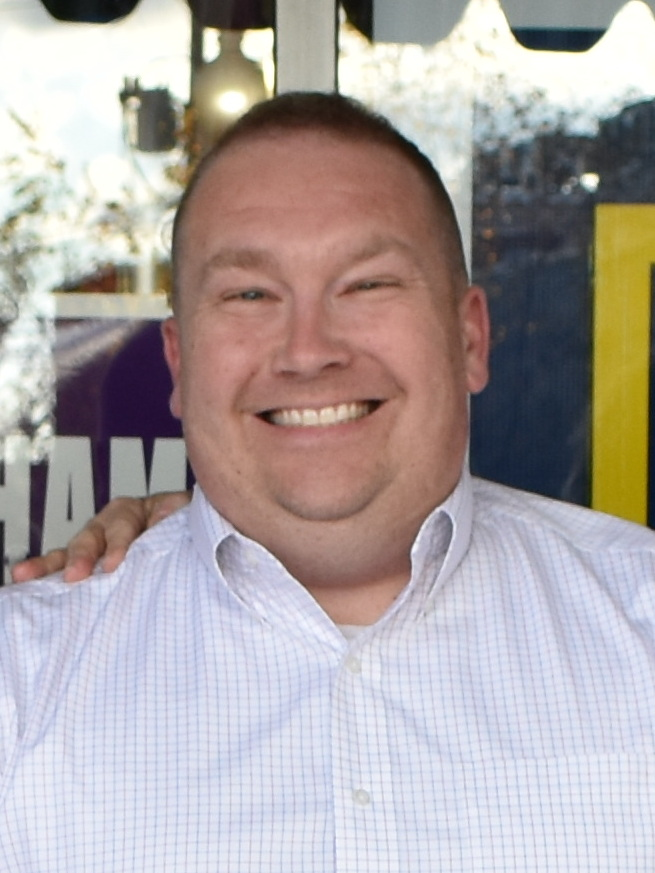
- Bennett in 2018

Member of the Illinois Senate from the 52nd district
- In office January 12, 2015 – December 9, 2022
- Preceded by: Mike Frerichs
- Succeeded by: Stacy Bennett

Personal details
- Born: July 16, 1977 Gibson City, Illinois, U.S.
- Died: December 9, 2022 (aged 45) Urbana, Illinois, U.S.
- Party: Democratic
- Spouse: Stacy
- Relations: Thomas M. Bennett (uncle)
- Children: 2
- Education: Illinois State University (B.A.); University of Illinois (J.D.)
- Profession: Attorney

Scott Michael Bennett (July 16, 1977 – December 9, 2022) was an American attorney, politician and Democratic member of the Illinois Senate representing the 52nd district from 2015 to 2022.

== Illinois Senate ==
Bennett was appointed to fill the vacancy left by Mike Frerichs, who resigned from representing the 52nd legislative district after he was elected Treasurer of Illinois in the 2014 general election. The 52nd district, located in Central Illinois, includes the towns of Champaign, Danville, Georgetown, Gifford, Rantoul, Thomasboro, and Urbana. His uncle Thomas M. Bennett also served in the Illinois General Assembly. Stacy Bennett succeeded Scott Bennett for the remainder of the 102nd General Assembly. On January 7, 2023, Paul Faraci, the Champaign Township Assessor, was appointed to fill the vacancy in the 103rd General Assembly created by Bennett's death.

=== Committee assignments ===
During the 102nd General Assembly, Senator Bennett was a member of the following Illinois Senate committees:

- Agriculture Committee (SAGR)
- (Chairman of) Appropriations - Higher Education Committee (SAPP-SAHE)
- Executive Appointments Committee (SEXA)
- (Chairman of) Higher Education Committee (SCHE)
- Judiciary Committee (SJUD)
- Judiciary - Business Entities Committee (SJUD-SJBE)
- (Chairman of) Judiciary - Privacy Committee (SJUD-SJPR)
- Labor Committee (SLAB)
- Redistricting Committee (SRED)
- (Chairman of) Redistricting - East Central & Southeast Illinois Committee (SRED-SRSE)
- Redistricting - Southern Illinois Committee (SRED-SRSI)
- Redistricting - West Central Illinois Committee (SRED-SRWC)
- State Government Committee (SGOA)
- (Chairman of) Unemployment Insurance (SLAB-SLUI)

== Death ==
Bennett died from complications of a brain tumor in Urbana, Illinois, on December 9, 2022, at the age of 45. In 2025, the Scott M. Bennett Administrative Building, a county administrative center, was named in his honor.
