= 103rd Illinois General Assembly =

Illinois state legislative session from 2023 to 2025

←	102nd	104th	→
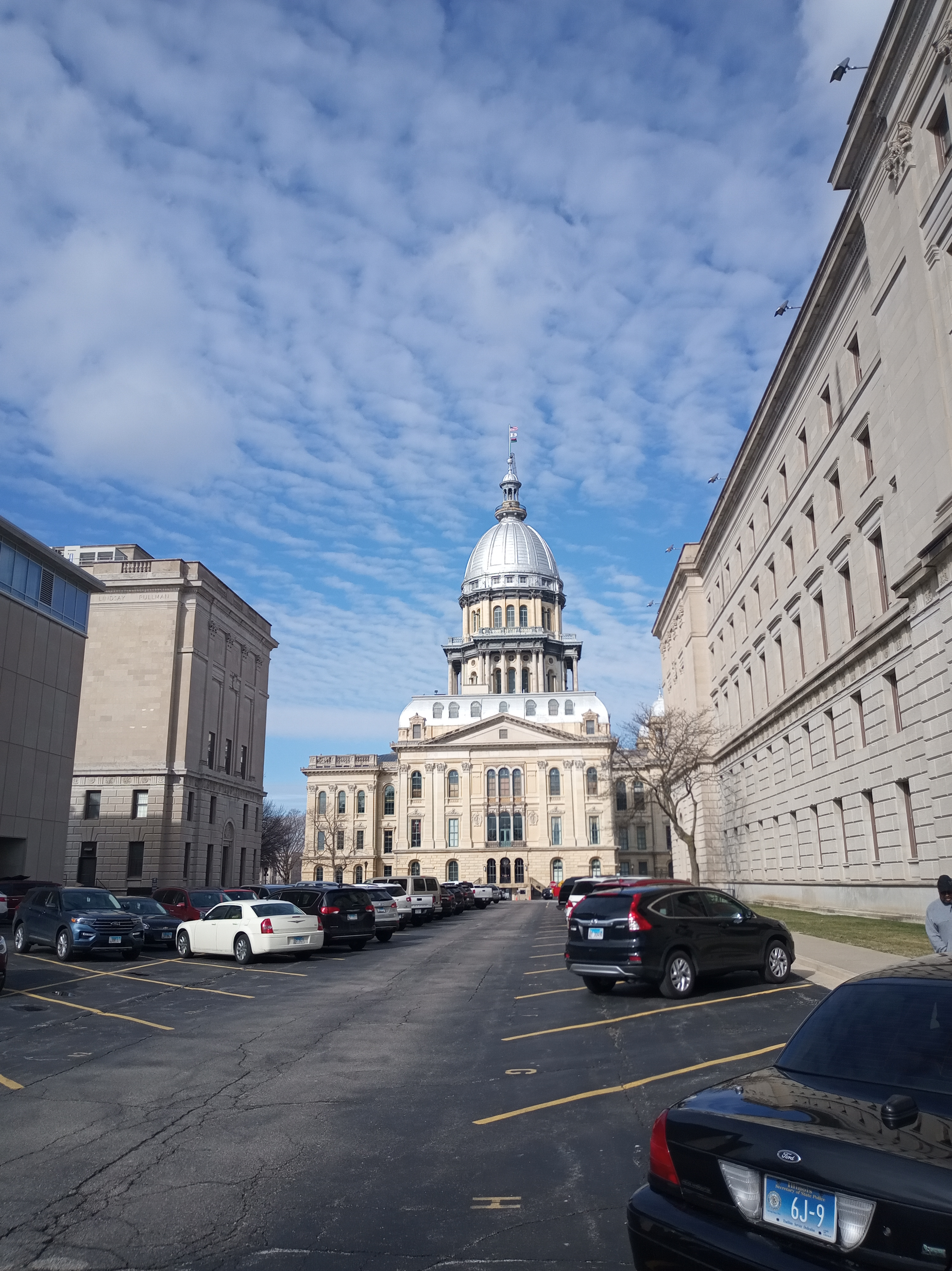
- The Illinois State Capitol in 2020

Overview
- Meeting place: Springfield, Illinois
- Term: 2023 – 2025
- Election: 2022
- Website: Official site

Illinois Senate
- President: Don Harmon, Democrat

Illinois House of Representatives
- Speaker: Emanuel Welch, Democrat

The 103rd Illinois General Assembly, consisting of the Illinois House and Illinois Senate, convened on January 11, 2023, and adjourned sine die on January 7, 2025.

The membership of the 103rd General Assembly was decided by the 2022 elections. The election resulted in the Democratic supermajority losing one seat in the Senate to the Republican party and gaining five seats in the House of Representatives.

== Senate ==
=== Party composition ===
Map of 2022 Illinois Senate election results

All of the Senate's 59 members were up for election in the 2022 Illinois Senate election. Two seats in the Senate changed hands from the Democratic to the Republican party, and one seat changed hands from the Republican party to the Democratic party.

Affiliation	Members
Democratic Party	40
Republican Party	19
Total	59

== House ==
=== Party composition ===
Map of 2022 Illinois House election results.

The House of the 103rd General Assembly consisted of 40 Republicans and 78 Democrats. The party composition reflected the results of the 2022 election.

Affiliation	Members
Democratic Party	78
Republican Party	40
Total	118

== See also ==
- List of Illinois state legislatures
