= 102nd Illinois General Assembly =

Illinois state legislative session from 2021 to 2023

←	101st	103rd	→
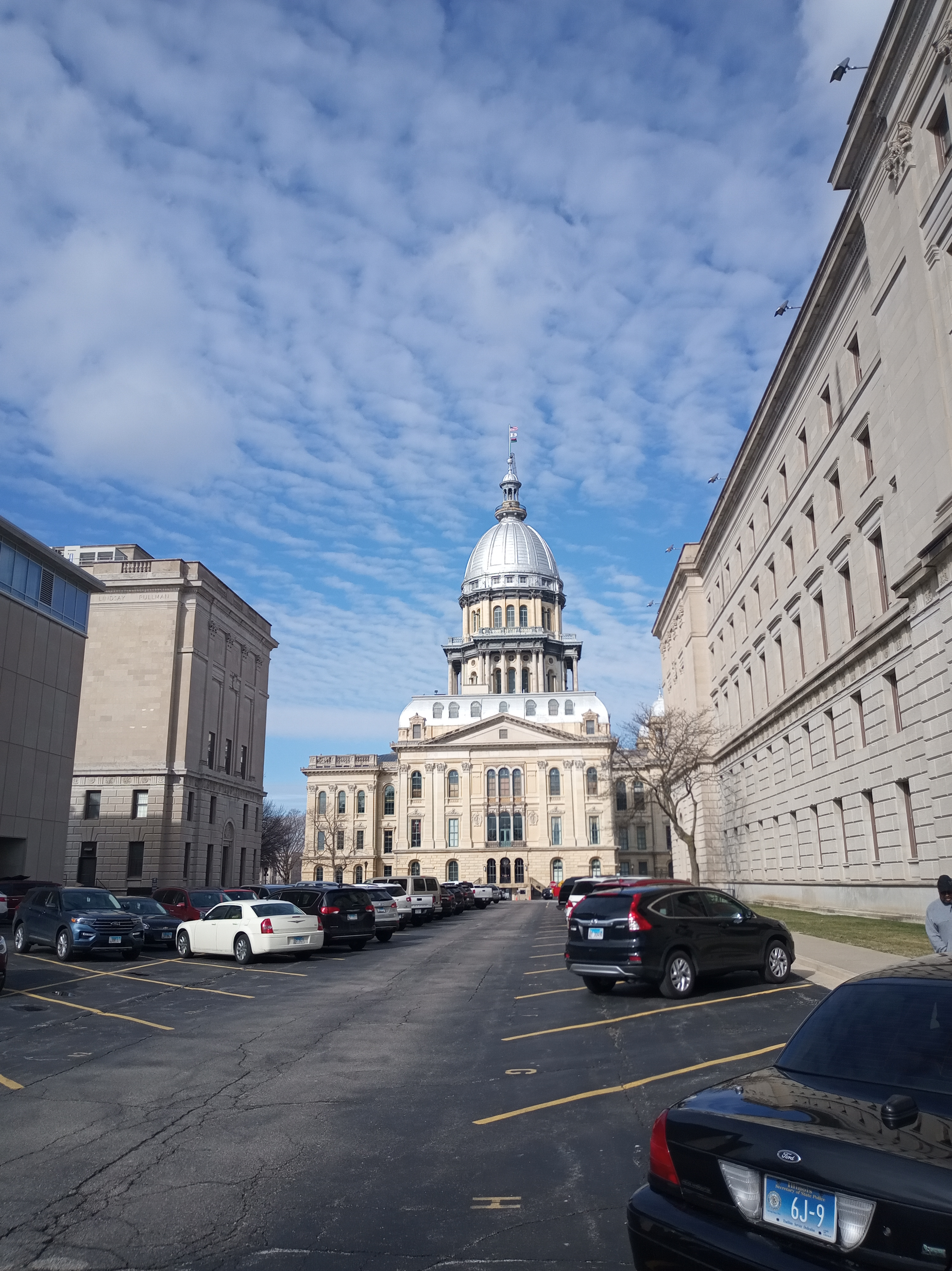
- The Illinois State Capitol in 2020

Overview
- Meeting place: Springfield, Illinois
- Term: 2021 – 2023
- Election: 2020
- Website: Official site

Illinois Senate
- President: Don Harmon, Democrat

Illinois House of Representatives
- Speaker: Emanuel Welch, Democrat

The 102nd Illinois General Assembly, consisting of the Illinois House and Illinois Senate, convened on January 13, 2021, and adjourned sine die on January 10, 2023. Over that period, it was in session for a total of 112 days.

The membership of the 102nd General Assembly was decided by the 2020 elections. The election resulted in the Democratic supermajority gaining one seat in the Senate and losing one seat to the Republican party in the House of Representatives.

== Legislation ==
The 102nd General Assembly passed a total of 1,116 bills into law.

== Senate ==
Map of 2020 Illinois Senate election results.

Of the Senate's 59 members, 22 were up for election in the 2020 Illinois Senate election. One seat in the Senate changed hands from the Republican to the Democratic party, and one seat changed hands from the Democratic party to the Republican party in the House.

=== Senate leadership ===
At the start of the session, the Senate reelected Don Harmon as president of the Senate, a position which he held since January 19, 2020, after he was unanimously elected to replace resigning president John J. Cullerton. The Senate Democrats reelected Kimberly Lightford as the majority leader, and the Senate Republicans elected Dan McConchie as the minority leader.

Position	Name	Party	District
President of the Senate	Don Harmon	Democratic	39
Majority Leader	Kimberly Lightford	Democratic	4
Minority Leader	Dan McConchie	Republican	26

=== Party composition ===
The Senate of the 102nd General Assembly consisted of 18 Republicans and 41 Democrats.

Affiliation	Members
Democratic Party	41
Republican Party	18
Total	59

== House ==
=== Party composition ===
Map of 2020 Illinois House election results.

The House of the 102nd General Assembly consisted of 45 Republicans and 73 Democrats. The party composition reflects the results of the 2020 election.

Affiliation	Members
Democratic Party	73
Republican Party	45
Total	118

=== House leadership ===
Position	Name	Party	District
Speaker of the House	Emanuel Welch	Democratic	7
Majority Leader	Greg Harris	Democratic	13
Minority Leader	Jim Durkin	Republican	82

== See also ==
- List of Illinois state legislatures
