= Mike Frerichs =

American politician

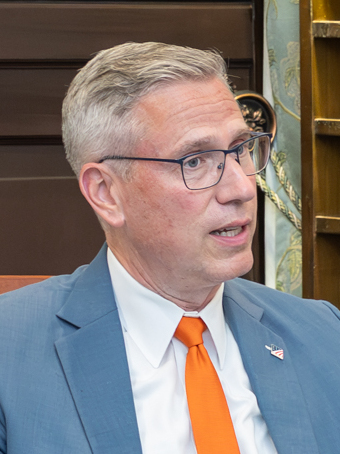
- Frerichs in 2026

74th Treasurer of Illinois
- Incumbent
- Assumed office January 12, 2015
- Governor: Bruce Rauner; JB Pritzker
- Preceded by: Dan Rutherford

Member of the Illinois Senate from the 52nd district
- In office January 2007 – January 12, 2015
- Preceded by: Rick Winkel
- Succeeded by: Scott Bennett

Auditor of Champaign County
- In office 2002–2007
- Preceded by: Gerrie Parr
- Succeeded by: Tony Fabri

Personal details
- Born: July 28, 1973 (age 53) Gifford, Illinois, U.S.
- Party: Democratic
- Spouses: Laura Appenzeller (m. 2003; div. 2013); Erica Baker (m. 2022)
- Children: 3
- Education: Yale University (BA); National Cheng Kung University

Michael W. Frerichs (/ˈfrɛrɪks/; born July 28, 1973) is an American politician who has been serving as the 74th state treasurer of Illinois since 2015. A member of the Democratic Party, he previously served in the Illinois Senate for the 52nd District from 2007 to 2015. The district, located in Champaign and Vermilion counties, includes all or parts of Champaign, Danville, Georgetown, Gifford, Rantoul, Thomasboro, and Urbana.

== Early life and career ==
Michael W. Frerichs was born on July 28, 1973, in Gifford, Illinois. After graduating from Rantoul Township High School, Frerichs attended Yale University and received his B.A. in 1995. He then went to Taiwan to study Mandarin Chinese at National Cheng Kung University in Tainan while also teaching English courses. He returned to Champaign County and launched his own technology business and served on his local volunteer fire department.

== Champaign County official ==
In 1998, Frerichs ran against then-State Representative Tim Johnson but lost. In 2000, Frerichs was elected to the Champaign County Board and re-elected in 2002.

Later that year, Frerichs was appointed to succeed Gerrie Parr as the Champaign County Auditor by his fellow board members. As Auditor, he was responsible for preparing budget reports, maintaining financial records, ensuring the county met state and federal financial reporting requirements, preventing fraud, and improving the financial health of the county. At the time, he was the only County Auditor in the state to become a Certified Public Finance Officer. Two years later, he was elected to the position.

== Illinois State Senator ==
In 2005, Frerichs announced he would run for the 52nd Senate District seat – which includes most of Champaign County and Vermilion County – to fill the vacancy caused by Rick Winkel's retirement. In what became the most expensive State Senate race of 2006, Frerichs was elected over former Senator Judith Myers by a margin of approximately 500 votes. He was the first Democratic State Senator to represent East Central Illinois since 1936.

Frerichs served as Chairman of the Illinois Senate's Committee on Higher Education, where he championed efforts to make college more affordable, and the Agriculture & Conservation and Enterprise Zone Extensions Committees. He also served on the Financial Institutions, Licensed Activities and Pensions, Public Pensions & State Investments, and the Agriculture & Conservation committees.

== Treasurer of Illinois ==
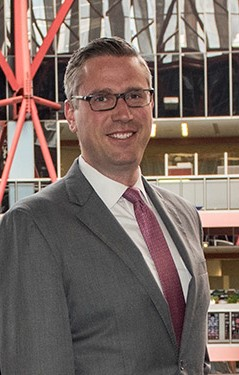
Frerichs in 2016

=== 2014 election ===
Frerichs announced his intention to run for the vacated office of Illinois Treasurer in early January 2014, after incumbent Republican Treasurer Dan Rutherford had announced his intention to run for Governor of Illinois. Frerichs ran uncontested in the Democratic Party primary and faced Republican Illinois State Representative and former Illinois State House Minority Leader Tom Cross in the General Election on November 4.

For more than two weeks after election day, the election was too close to call. Frerichs was declared the winner, defeating Cross 48.1% to 47.8%. The election was one of the closest in Illinois state history, being decided by only 9,225 votes out of more than 3.5 million ballots cast.

=== 2018 election ===
Frerichs sought reelection as State Treasurer in the 2018 election. He ran unopposed in the Democratic Party primary and faced Orland Park Village Trustee Jim Dodge, the Republican candidate, and financial analyst Mike Leheney, the Libertarian candidate, in the November 6, 2018, general election. Frerichs won with over 57.6% of the vote.

=== 2022 election ===
Frerichs was unopposed for State Treasurer in the 2022 primary election. In the November 8, 2022, general election, he faced Republican State Rep. Tom Demmer and Libertarian candidate Preston Nelson. Frerichs won with 54.3% of the vote.

=== Tenure ===
Frerichs was first inaugurated on January 12, 2015. He is currently serving as the 74th Treasurer of Illinois. He also serves as a Trustee and vice-chair of the Illinois State Board of Investment (ISBI). Frerichs was unanimously elected president of the bipartisan National Association of State Auditors, Comptrollers, and Treasurers in 2022. He was elected to serve as senior vice-president of the National Association of State Treasurers (NAST) in 2022. Frerichs was elected Secretary-Treasurer of the National Association of State Treasurers (NAST) for 2022, and was also elected by his peers across the country to serve on the National Association of State Auditors, Comptrollers and Treasurers' (NASACT) Executive Committee. The College Savings Plans Network honored Frerichs with its Distinguished Service Award in 2022.

In November 2018, Treasurer Frerichs launched Secure Choice, a retirement savings program for private-sector workers in Illinois who do not have access to an employer-sponsored retirement plan.

Frerich has invested $115 million into Israeli bonds, $30 million of which he agreed to invest after October 7, 2023.

== Personal life ==
Frerichs married Laura Appenzeller in 2003. They had one daughter in 2008 and divorced in 2013. Frerichs married marketing executive Erica Baker in 2022.

== Electoral history ==
2006 General Election Results – Illinois’s 52nd Senate District
Party	Candidate	Votes	%
Democratic	Mike Frerichs	27,149	48.8
Republican	Judith Myers	26,607	47.8
Socialist	Joseph Parnaraukis	1,894	3.4
Democratic gain from Republican			

2010 General Election Results- Illinois's 52nd Senate District
Party	Candidate	Votes	%
Democratic	Mike Frerichs (incumbent)	32,583	61.5
Republican	Al Reynolds	20,450	38.5
Democratic hold			

2012 General Election Results- Illinois's 52nd Senate District
Party	Candidate	Votes	%
Democratic	Mike Frerichs (incumbent)	48,493	100
Democratic hold			

2014 General Election Results – Illinois’s State Treasurer
Party	Candidate	Votes	%
Democratic	Mike Frerichs	1,694,884	48.05
Republican	Tom Cross	1,685,659	47.79
Libertarian	Matt Skopek	146,654	4.16
Democratic gain from Republican			

2018 General Election Results – Illinois’s State Treasurer
Party	Candidate	Votes	%
Democratic	Mike Frerichs (incumbent)	2,593,816	57.6
Republican	Jim Dodge	1,710,082	38.9
Libertarian	Mike Leheney	155,256	3.5
Democratic hold			

2022 General Election Results – Illinois’s State Treasurer
Party	Candidate	Votes	%
Democratic	Mike Frerichs (incumbent)	2,206,434	54.2
Republican	Tom Demmer	1,767,242	43.4
Libertarian	Preston Nelson	90,647	2.2
Write-in		38	0.0
Democratic hold			

Party political offices
Preceded by Robin Kelly	Democratic nominee for Treasurer of Illinois; 2014, 2018, 2022, 2026	Most recent
Political offices
Preceded by Dan Rutherford	Treasurer of Illinois; 2015–present	Incumbent
