= List of people from Urbana, Illinois =

The following list includes notable people who were born or have lived in Urbana, Illinois. For a similar list, see the category page People from Urbana, Illinois.

== Academics and writing ==
- Philip W. Anderson, earned the Nobel Prize in Physics (1977)
- John Bardeen, inventor of the transistor; awarded Nobel Prize in Physics (1956 & 1972); winner of IEEE Medal of Honor (1971)
- Iris Chang, author (The Rape of Nanking)
- Ward Churchill, author and political activist
- David Forsyth, computer scientist; co-author of Computer Vision: A Modern Approach
- Eugie Foster, science-fiction writer
- Theodore Gray, co-founder of Wolfram Research and winner of the Ig Nobel Prize in Chemistry (2002)
- José Graziano, Brazilian agronomist; secretary general of the FAO
- Robert W. Holley, earned the Nobel Prize in Physiology or Medicine (1968); graduate of Urbana High School (1939)
- Braj Kachru, linguist; created the "circle model" of world English varieties
- Edwin G. Krebs, recipient of the Nobel Prize in Physiology or Medicine (1994); graduate of Urbana High School (1937)
- Paul Christian Lauterbur, earned the Nobel Prize in Physiology or Medicine (2003)
- Sir Anthony James Leggett, earned the Nobel Prize in Physics (2003)
- Revilo P. Oliver, professor, writer, University of Illinois (1977)
- Hamilton O. Smith, earned the Nobel Prize in Medicine (1978)
- Thelma Strabel, novelist, grew up in Urbana
- James Tobin, earned the Nobel Prize in Economics (1981)
- David Foster Wallace, author (Infinite Jest); graduate of Urbana High School
- Brian Wansink, author (Mindless Eating: Why We Eat More Than We Think); professor at Cornell University
- Gregorio Weber, Argentinian spectroscopist and protein chemist, worked in Urbana from 1962
- Carl Woese, microbiologist; identified Archaea as a domain of life

== Fine arts ==
- Christopher Brown, painter, printmaker, and professor.

== Media and music ==
- Ken Baumann, actor (The Secret Life of the American Teenager)
- Jay Bennett, founding member of Wilco; solo musician; died in May 2009
- Emily Blue, singer-songwriter, Chicago Reader Award winner
- Deborah Blum, journalist, Pulitzer Prize winner, author of The Poisoner's Handbook; graduate of Urbana High School
- Roger Ebert, movie critic; Pulitzer Prize winner
- Jennie Garth, actress (What I Like About You, Beverly Hills, 90210 and 90210)
- Erika Harold, 2002 Miss Illinois and 2003 Miss America; graduate of Urbana High School
- Michael S. Hart, author, inventor of the electronic book; founder of Project Gutenberg, first project to make ebooks freely available via the Internet
- William Slavens McNutt, screenwriter (Huckleberry Finn)
- Nina Paley, cartoonist, animator, and free culture activist
- Mark Roberts, actor, comedian, writer, creator of the TV series Mike and Molly
- Chic Sale, author, actor, and vaudevillian
- Virginia Sale, actress
- Gil Shaham, violinist
- David Ogden Stiers, actor (Major Charles Emerson Winchester III on the TV series M*A*S*H)
- Peter Thoegersen, composer
- Sasha Velour, drag queen, artist, fashion forward winner of Season 9 of RuPaul's Drag Race
- American Football (band), midwestern emo and math rock band
- Jeff Austin, Founding member and frontman of the bluegrass band Yonder Mountain String Band until his departure in 2014.

=== Fictional ===
- HAL 9000, character in the film 2001: A Space Odyssey; upon "dying" claims he was made operational in Urbana

== Business ==
- Brady Dougan, CEO of Credit Suisse Group
- Tony Hsieh, former CEO of Zappos
- Shahid Khan, CEO of Flex-N-Gate; owner of the Jacksonville Jaguars
- Tony Khan, son of Shahid Khan; owner of All Elite Wrestling

== Military ==
- Larry Allen Abshier, U.S. soldier who defected to North Korea after the Korean War in 1962
- Charles Carpenter (Lt. Col.), U.S. Army officer and army observation pilot (Second World War); taught history at Urbana High School
- Reginald C. Harmon, first US Air Force Judge Advocate General; Mayor of Urbana

== Politics and law ==
- Thomas B. Berns, Illinois state legislator, civil engineer, and surveyor
- Bird Sim Coler, Comptroller of Greater New York
- George W. Dilling, mayor of Seattle from 1911 to 1912
- Stanley B. Weaver, Illinois state legislator, funeral director, and Mayor of Urbana
- William B. Webber, Illinois state legislator, lawyer, and mayor of Urbana
- Dennis Yao, member of the Federal Trade Commission (FTC)

== Sports ==
- LaToya Bond, guard for the Indiana Fever (WNBA)
- Scott Garrelts, pitcher for the San Francisco Giants
- Jonathan Kuck, Olympic speed skater; silver medalist
- Ella Masar, forward for the Chicago Red Stars
- Spencer Patton, pitcher for the Chicago Cubs
- Nancy Thies, American gymnast who competed at the 1972 Summer Olympics
