= General Elliott =

General Elliott, Eliott, or Elliot, may refer to:

- Alexander Elliot (British Army officer) (1825–1909), British Army major general
- Christopher Haslett Elliott (born 1947), British Army major general
- Christopher Leslie Elliott (born 1947), British Army major general
- Edward Locke Elliot (1850–1938), British Army lieutenant general
- Francis Augustus Eliott, 2nd Baron Heathfield (1750–1813), British Army general
- Frank Worth Elliott Jr. (1924–1997), U.S. Air Force major general
- George Augustus Eliott, 1st Baron Heathfield (1717–1790), British Army general
- George F. Elliott (1846–1931), U.S. Marine Corps major general
- Granville Elliott (1713–1759), British Army major general
- Harold Elliott (Australian Army officer) (1878–1931), Australian Army major general
- Roger Elliott (governor) (c. 1665–1714), English Army major general
- Stephen Elliott Jr. (1830–1866), Confederate States Army brigadier general
- Washington Lafayette Elliott (1825–1888), Union Army brigadier general
- William Henry Elliott (1792–1874), British Army general

== See also ==
- Attorney General Elliott (disambiguation)
