= Laurel Lunt Prussing =

American politician

Mayor of Urbana, Illinois
- In office May 2005 – May 2017
- Preceded by: Tod Satterthwaite
- Succeeded by: Diane Wolfe Marlin

Member of the Illinois House of Representatives from the 103rd district
- In office January 1993 – January 1995
- Preceded by: Helen Satterthwaite (redistricted)
- Succeeded by: Rick Winkel

Personal details
- Born: February 21, 1941 (age 85) New York City, New York, U.S.
- Party: Democratic
- Spouse: John Prussing
- Children: 3
- Education: Wellesley College (BA); Boston University (MA); University of Illinois (ABD)
- Profession: Economist

Laurel Lunt Prussing (born February 21, 1941) is a Democratic politician who has served as a member of the Illinois House of Representatives, the Mayor of Urbana, Illinois, and County Treasurer of Champaign County, Illinois.

== Early career ==
After earning degrees from Wellesley College and Boston University Lunt-Prussing worked as a research economist at the University of Illinois at Urbana–Champaign In 1972, she was elected to the Champaign County Board and in 1976 she was elected Champaign County Auditor. While Auditor, Prussing served as president of the Illinois Association of County Auditors and a member of two of the Illinois Comptroller's committees; the local government audit advisory committee and the committee on accounting, auditing and financial reporting. She is married to John Prussing and has three children. She is the author of "Downstate County Government," and advocated for Champaign County to adopt the position of county executive as per the Illinois County Executive Act of 1970.

== Illinois House of Representatives ==
In the 1990 redistricting, the 103rd district’s longtime incumbent, Helen F. Satterthwaite was drawn into a more conservative district that removed the University of Illinois' campus and replaced it with rural, staunchly Republican territory in Champaign, Ford, and Douglas counties. Prussing chose to run in the new 103rd district which now consisted of northeastern Champaign County and southern Ford County. Lunt was narrowly elected, defeating Republican candidate Gregory Cozad, an attorney and financial planner. A Republican target in 1994, she was defeated by Champaign County board member Rick Winkel in an election that saw a record number of Republicans elected.

== Interim ==
In 1996 and 1998, Lunt Prussing ran for Congress in Illinois's 15th congressional district against Tom Ewing. She ran again in 2000, but lost to college professor Mike Kelleher. Kelleher went on to lose to State Representative Tim Johnson. In 2000, she endorsed the presidential campaign of Ralph Nader. In 2002, she lost the Democratic primary for the 103rd district, which now only included Champaign and Urbana, to former Champaign County Recorder of Deeds Naomi Jakobsson.

== Mayor of Urbana ==
In 2004, Prussing announced her candidacy for the Democratic nomination for Mayor of Urbana against three term incumbent Tod Satterthwaite, the son of Helen F. Satterthwaite, her predecessor in the state house. She won the municipal primary and ran unopposed in the 2005 municipal election. She served as the first female mayor of Urbana. She was re-elected in 2009 and 2013. She was defeated in the 2017 primary by Alderwoman Diane Wolfe Marlin.

While Mayor of Urbana, Prussing served as a member of the Illinois P-20 Council and the Law Enforcement Training and Standards Board.

== Champaign County Treasurer ==
Lunt Prussing was elected County Treasurer of Champaign County in the 2018 general election. She resigned from the office effective January 31, 2020.
