= William Webber =

William Webber may refer to:

- William Webber (criminal) (1877–1936), underworld figure in New York
- William Lloyd Webber (1914–1982), English organist and composer
- William Webber (bishop) (1837–1903), Anglican bishop of Brisbane
- William Webber (surgeon) (1800–1875), English surgeon
- William B. Webber (1836–1916), American lawyer and politician from Illinois
- William L. Webber (1825–1901), American politician from Michigan
- Bill Webber (trade unionist) (1901–1982), Welsh trade union leader
- Wee Willie Webber (Bill Webber, 1929–2010), Philadelphia TV and radio personality

== See also ==
- William Weber (disambiguation)
