= Judith A. Myers =

American educator, secretary, and politician

Judith A. "Judy" Myers (October 29, 1939) is an American educator, secretary, and politician.

Born in Winamac, Indiana, Myers received her bachelor's degree in education from Purdue University. She moved to Danville, Illinois and was a public school teacher and a secretary for a manufacturing company. In 1980, Myers was elected recorder for Vermillion County, Illinois and was a Republican. Myers was appointed to the Illinois Senate in 1997 and served until 2003. She lost her seat when redistricting drew her into a district based in Champaign-Urbana, and she was defeated in the Republican primary by State Representative Rick Winkel. After Winkel retired from the Illinois Senate, Myers made a failed comeback bid losing to Democratic candidate and then-Champaign County Auditor Mike Frerichs in the 2006 general election.

Secretary of State Jesse White appointed Myers to the Secretary of State Merit Commission most recently for a term starting February 3, 2014 and ending November 12, 2019. Myers was confirmed for this term by the Illinois Senate on February 17, 2015.
