= Octave Chanute Aerospace Museum =

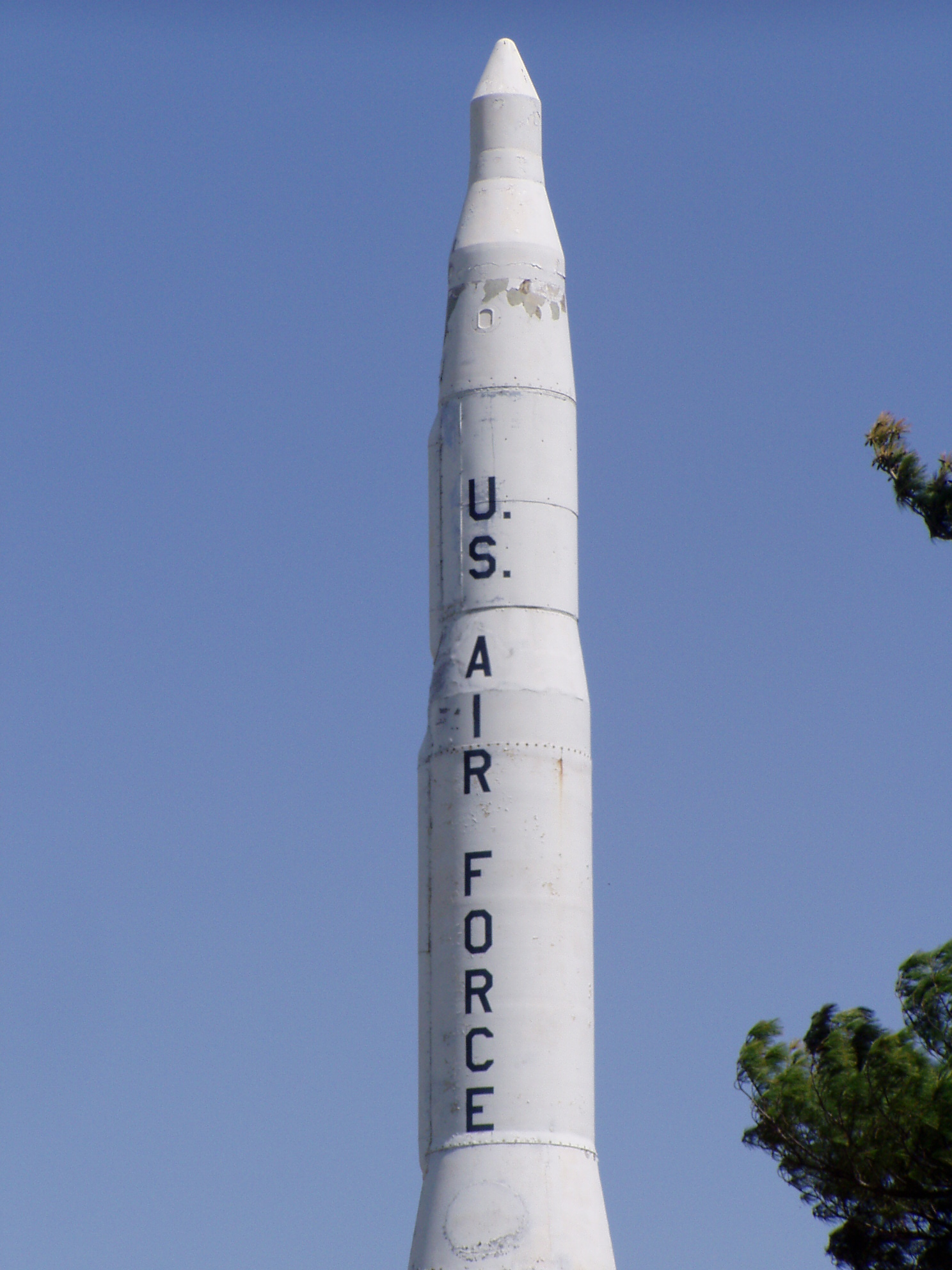
- LGM-30A Minuteman I

- Location within Illinois Location within the United States
- Established: 8 October 1994
- Dissolved: 1 November 2015
- Location: Rantoul, Illinois
- Coordinates: 40°17′42″N 88°9′9″W
- Type: Aviation museum
- President: William S. Clayton
- Curator: Mark Hanson
- Website: Archived 2015-07-01 at the Wayback Machine

The Octave Chanute Aerospace Museum, the largest aviation museum in Illinois, occupied part of the grounds of the decommissioned Chanute Air Force Base in Rantoul, Illinois. It and the base were named for Octave Chanute, railroad engineer and aviation pioneer. The museum was dedicated to the life and works of Chanute, the former air base, the history of aviation in the state of Illinois, and hosted an annual air show.

Highlights of the museum included a collection of over 40 aircraft including military fighters, bombers, rescue, recon, and cargo aircraft. Many of these were used for training purposes at Chanute, and most were on loan from the United States Air Force Museum. Other exhibits of note included a replica of the Wright 1903 Flyer, a large collection of Frasca Flight Simulators, and tributes to the veterans who have served in America's conflicts and wars.

The museum closed on November 1, 2015.

== History ==
Chanute Air Force Base operated in Rantoul from 1917-1993. After decommission, the cleanup and conversion of the 2,125-acre (8.60 km^{2}) grounds began. Economic redevelopment of the former base was a paramount concern to the surrounding community. As of 2008, portions of the site are still unoccupied, due in part to environmental concerns including asbestos contamination. Nevertheless, much has been repurposed into civilian concerns. The Octave Chanute Aerospace Museum was one of the earliest efforts, opening in 1994.

The museum was located in Grissom Hall, which functioned as the missile maintenance training facility during active Air Force operations. Until base closure in 1993, all Air Force Minuteman missile maintenance training was provided at Chanute. The building has largely been preserved and was restored to its condition at the time of base closure; four authentic Minuteman training silos were displayed at the museum.

The museum was administered under the direction of a private foundation.

Efforts to found a museum started as early as 1991, after it was recognized that the closure of the base would cause the dispersal of the aircraft on display there. A few months before it opened on 8 October 1994, the museum was involved in a dispute over the display of a B-25. The United States Air Force wanted to transfer the airplane to a base in Alabama.

On 23 April 2015, it was announced that the museum would be closing due to lack of funds on December 30 of that year. However, the closing date was later moved up and the museum closed on November 1. Some of the exhibits went to other museums in the state of Illinois. In 2016, the museum’s archival records, including blueprints, maps, publications, oral histories, photographs, scrapbooks, videotapes, and administrative records, were sent to the Champaign County Historical Archives for public access and research. Some aircraft remained onsite until 2018, when they were scrapped.

== Status of artifacts ==
Identity (S/N or BuNo)	Aircraft	Status	History
41-17372	North American AT-6B Texan	National Museum of the United States Air Force, Wright-Patterson Air Force Base, Dayton, Ohio	Built as an AT-6B, not known to have converted to any other configuration. Formerly displayed at the Chanute Air Museum, IL (marked as 42-805). When this museum closed, the aircraft was sent to the National Museum of the United States Air Force, and placed in storage.
43-49336	Douglas VC-47B Skytrain	Scrap	Built as a C-47B, later converted to VC-47B. Formerly displayed at the Chanute Air Museum, IL. When this museum closed, the plane was auctioned by Government Liquidation for scrapping on Sep 25, 2017.
44-30635	North American TB-25N Mitchell	Southern Museum of Flight, Birmingham, Alabama	Built as a B-25J, later converted to TB-25N. Formerly displayed at the Chanute Air Museum, IL. Before this museum closed, Southern Museum of Flight began taking apart the plane to move it to its museum.
44-64265	North American P-51H Mustang	Museum of Aviation, Robins Air Force Base, Warner Robins, Georgia	Built as a P-51H, not known to have converted to any other configuration. Was accepted by USAAF July 1945 and sent to Pinecastle AAF in Florida where it was used as a training and familiarization aircraft. Transferred to Chanute Field to be used as airframe maintenance trainer. Officially retired in 1949. Formerly displayed at the Chanute Air Museum, IL. When this museum closed, the aircraft was sent to then to display at Museum of Aviation, named “Louisiana Heatwave.”
45-8501	Lockheed P-80B Shooting Star	Kirtland Air Force Base, Albuquerque, New Mexico	Built as a P-80B, not known to have converted to any other configuration. Formerly displayed at the Chanute Air Museum, IL. Was seen on display at Kirtland Air Force Base as early as 2013, but may have been here well before that.
45-59494	Republic YP-84A Thunderjet	Discovery Park of America, Union City, Tennessee	Built as a YP-84A, not known to have converted to any other configuration. Formerly displayed at the Chanute Air Museum, IL, improperly marked as 488656. When this museum closed, the plane was sent to display at Discovery Park of America.
46-66	Boeing XB-47 Stratojet	Air Force Flight Test Museum, Edwards Air Force Base, Lancaster, California	Built at Boeing Seattle as a XB-47, not known to have converted to any other configuration. The second XB-47 built, after 46-65. First flight 21 July 1948. Test flown at Edwards Air Force Base. In 1954, 46-65 was scrapped, making 46-66 the oldest B-47 in existence, and the only surviving XB-47. Formerly displayed at the Chanute Air Museum, IL. When this museum closed, the aircraft was sent to Edwards Air Force Base, to the Air Force Flight Test Museum in 2016. Awaiting funds for restoration.
47-615	North American F-86A Sabre	Fort Wayne Air National Guard Station, Fort Wayne, Indiana	Built as a P-86A, later redesignated F-86A in 1948. Formerly displayed at the Chanute Air Museum, IL (once falsely marked as 72910). When this museum closed, the aircraft was sent to display at the Fort Wayne Air National Guard Station heritage park.
51-7200	Grumman HU-16B Albatross	Scrap	Built as a SA-16B, redesignated HU-16B in 1962. Formerly displayed at the Chanute Air Museum, IL. When this museum closed, the plane was auctioned by Government Liquidation for scrapping on Sep 25, 2017.
51-9531	Republic F-84F Thunderstreak	Palm Springs Air Museum, Palm Springs, California	Built by General Motors as a F-84F, not known to have converted to any other configuration. Formerly displayed at the Chanute Air Museum, IL. The plane was seen dismantled at Palm Springs Air Museum in September 2015. Was noted as being reassembled and marked as 26675 in April 2017.
52-898	Boeing C-97G Stratofreighter	McGhee Tyson Air National Guard Base, Alcoa, Tennessee	Only the vertical stabilizer was preserved. Built as a KC-97G, later converted to C-97G. Formerly displayed near the Chanute Air Museum, IL. When this museum closed, the plane was destined for scrapping. Put up for sale in auction by Government Liquidation for scrapping on Sep 25, 2017. Vertical stabilizer sent to McGhee Tyson Air National Guard Base, near Knoxville, Tennessee, for display. The tail has been painted with the serial number of KC-97L Stratofreighter, s/n 53-354, a plane that flew with the 134th ARW at the base. The actual 53-354 is on display at Castle Air Museum, California.
52-9797	Lockheed T-33A Shooting Star	Fort Wayne Air National Guard Station, Fort Wayne, Indiana	Built as a T-33A, not known to have converted to any other configuration. Formerly displayed at the Chanute Air Museum, IL. When this museum closed, the aircraft was sent to display at the Fort Wayne Air National Guard Station heritage park.
53-412	Douglas JRB-66B Destroyer	Scrap	Built as a RB-66B, later modified as a JRB-66B to test radar and control system of Boeing-MARC BOMARC missiles. Formerly displayed at the Chanute Air Museum, IL. When this museum closed, the plane was auctioned by Government Liquidation for scrapping on Sep 25, 2017.
54-104	Republic F-105B Thunderchief	Scrap	Built as a F-105B, not known to have converted to any other configuration. Formerly displayed at the Chanute Air Museum, IL. When this museum closed, the plane was auctioned by Government Liquidation for scrapping on Sep 25, 2017.
54-1784	North American F-100C Super Sabre	Prairie Aviation Museum, Bloomington, Illinois	Built as a F-100C, not known to have converted to any other configuration. Formerly displayed at the Chanute Air Museum, IL. Went to Prairie Aviation Museum, Bloomington, Illinois, for display, in August 2009.
54-1785	North American F-100C Super Sabre	Yankee Air Museum, Belleville, Michigan	Built as a F-100C, not known to have converted to any other configuration. Formerly displayed at the Chanute Air Museum, IL. When this museum closed, the aircraft was sent to the Yankee Air Museum, near Detroit, Michigan.
55-037	Lockheed GC-130A Hercules	Museum of Missouri Military History, Missouri National Guard Ike Skelton Training Center, Jefferson City, Missouri	Built as a C-130A, later converted to GC-130A. Formerly displayed at the Chanute Air Museum, IL. When this museum closed, the plane was destined for scrapping, but was moved in May 2016 to display at the Museum of Missouri Military History at the Missouri National Guard Ike Skelton Training Center, Jefferson City, Missouri.
51-13730	Convair B-36 Peacemaker	Castle Air Museum, Atwater, California	Built as a RB-36H, not known to have converted to any other configuration. Formerly displayed at the Chanute Air Museum, IL. Went to Castle Air Museum, before Chanute Air Museum closed.
55-095	Boeing B-52D Stratofortress	Valiant Air Command Warbird Museum, Titusville, Florida	Only the nose and cockpit section preserved. Built as a B-52D, not known to have converted to any other configuration. Became ground instruction airframe; only the nose and cockpit section remained. Formerly displayed at the Chanute Air Museum, IL. Went to Valiant Air Command Warbird Museum before Chanute Air Museum closed; under restoration.
55-666	Convair B-58A Hustler	Castle Air Museum, Atwater, California	Built as a YB-58A, later redesignated B-58A, modified as an engine test bed for the General Electric J79-GE-5 engine. Assigned to Air Force Flight Test Center, Edwards Air Force Base, California. Put on display at Chanute Air Force Base, IL as 61-2059. Later painted as itself. Was damaged by Chanute Air Museum staff while they were attempting to move the plane while the wheels on the main gear were locked up and the nose gear was irreparably fractured. When this museum closed, the plane remained in a hangar at Chanute until August 2017, when it moved to Castle Air Museum.
56-273	McDonnell NF-101B Voodoo	Rantoul National Aviation Center, Rantoul, Illinois	Built as a F-101B, later converted to NF-101B. Formerly displayed at the Chanute Air Museum, IL. When this museum closed, the aircraft was to be sent to Southern Museum of Flight, Birmingham, Alabama. It was seen still on tarmac behind the former Octave Chanute Aerospace Museum in July 2018.
56-732	Lockheed F-104A Starfighter	McGhee Tyson Air National Guard Base, Alcoa, Tennessee	Built as a F-104A, not known to have converted to any other configuration. Formerly displayed at the Chanute Air Museum, IL. Before this museum closed, the plane was sent to McGhee Tyson Air National Guard Base, near Knoxville, Tennessee, for display.
56-2009	Douglas C-133A Cargomaster	Scrap	Built as a C-133A, not known to have converted to any other configuration. To Chanute Air Force Base Apr 1971 as a training airframe. Transferred to National Museum of the United States Air Force custody Jun 1977, but remained on display at Chanute AFB, and eventually to Chanute Air Museum, IL. When this museum closed, the plane was auctioned by Government Liquidation for scrapping on Sep 25, 2017.
59-2796	North American AGM-28A Hound Dog	Museum of Aviation, Robins Air Force Base, Warner Robins, Georgia	Built as a GAM-77; GAM-77s were later redesignated AGM-28As in June 1963. Formerly displayed at the Chanute Air Museum, IL. When this museum closed, the missile was sent to display at Museum of Aviation.
61-686	Bell UH-1B Iroquois (“Huey”)	Discovery Park of America, Union City, Tennessee	Built as a HU-1B, later redesignated UH-1B in 1962. Formerly displayed at the Chanute Air Museum, IL. When this museum closed, the helicopter was sent to display at Discovery Park of America.
62-4494	North American CT-39A Sabreliner	Scrap	Built as a T-39A, later converted to CT-39A. Formerly displayed at the Chanute Air Museum, IL. When this museum closed, the plane was auctioned by Government Liquidation for scrapping on Sep 25, 2017.
62-12201	McDonnell RF-4C Phantom II	Regional Military Museum, Houma, Louisiana	Built as a YRF-110A Spectre (the third of the aircraft that would become USAF F-4s), soon redesignated RF-4C. Delivered to GE Flight Test Jan 1966 for General Electric J79 engine development work. Returned to USAF Jun 1972. Also used for development of SUU-16/A gun pod. Formerly displayed at the Chanute Air Museum, IL. When this museum closed, the aircraft was sent to display at the Regional Military Museum, Houma, Louisiana.
63-8287	Republic F-105F Thunderchief	Aviation Museum of Kentucky, Lexington, Kentucky	Built as a F-105F, not known to have converted to any other configuration. Formerly displayed at the Chanute Air Museum, IL. When this museum closed, the plane was destined for scrapping, but found a new home at Aviation Museum of Kentucky.
63-8441	Northrop F-5B Freedom Fighter	Phillip and Patricia Frost Museum of Science, Miami, Florida	Built as a F-5B, not known to have converted to any other configuration. Formerly displayed at the Chanute Air Museum, IL. When this museum closed, the plane was sent to display at Phillip and Patricia Frost Museum of Science. Currently displayed completely covered in chrome.
63-9767	General Dynamics F-111A Aardvark	Waukegan National Airport, Waukegan, Illinois	Built as a F-111A, not known to have converted to any other configuration. Was used as an engine/intake test bed. Formerly displayed at the Chanute Air Museum, IL. When this museum closed, the plane was sent to Waukegan National Airport and restored. To be put on display at the Lake County Veterans Memorial at the airport.
67-21411	Cessna O-2A Skymaster	Museum of Aviation, Robins Air Force Base, Warner Robins, Georgia	Built as an O-2A, not known to have converted to any other configuration. Formerly displayed at the Chanute Air Museum, IL. When this museum closed, the aircraft was sent to Museum of Aviation; in storage there.
69-6190	Ling-Temco-Vought GA-7D Corsair II	Russell Military Museum, Zion, Illinois	Built as an A-7D. The plane ended its career by being sent to the Technical Training Center at Chanute Air Force Base in February 1977 for use as a ground instruction airframe for mechanics, and redesignated GA-7D. Around 1985 it was restored and placed on display at a memorial park on the base. When the base closed in 1993, it became property of the National Museum of the United States Air Force, who loaned it to the new Chanute Air Museum in 1994. When this museum closed, the plane was sent to display at Russell Military Museum, Zion, Illinois.
71-0286	McDonnell Douglas GF-15A Eagle	Combat Air Museum, Topeka, Kansas	Built as a F-15A. First flight Jun 14, 1973 at St. Louis, Missouri. Used as the trials aircraft for armament development and external fuel stores testing. Assigned to the F-15 Joint Test Force at Edwards Air Force Base, Sep 1973 to Nov 1980. Withdrawn from use and redesignated GF-15A. Was at Technical Training Center, Chanute AFB from Mar 1982 to Aug 1990. Formerly displayed at the Chanute Air Museum, IL. When this museum closed, the aircraft was sent to the Saint Louis Science Center; likely in storage off site. Currently on display at the Combat Air Museum, Topeka, KS. as of July 2022.
Unknown	Boeing LGM-30A Minuteman I	Rantoul National Aviation Center, Rantoul, Illinois	This LGM-30A was a gate guard at the former front gate of Chanute Air Force Base. Was put up for sale in auction by Government Liquidation for scrapping on Sep 25, 2017, but it seems the Minuteman was not scrapped, as seen in current satellite imagery.
139947 (Navy BuNo)	Douglas A-4A Skyhawk	MAPS Air Museum, North Canton, Ohio	Built as an A4D-1, later redesignated A-4A in 1962. In June 1987, the plane was finally retired from the Navy and transferred to Chanute Air Force Base for use in maintenance training. After one year, it was marked as a Blue Angels aircraft and placed on display, transferring to the Chanute Air Museum when the base closed in 1993. When this museum closed, the plane was transferred to MAPS Air Museum.
141311 (Navy BuNo)	Lockheed EC-121K Warning Star	Yankee Air Museum, Belleville, Michigan	Built as a PO-2W, redesignated WV-2 before delivery, then to EC-121K in 1962. Formerly displayed at the Chanute Air Museum, IL. When this museum closed, the plane was destined for scrapping, but was moved in 2017 to the Yankee Air Museum, near Detroit, Michigan, awaiting restoration.

=== Non-military and replica airframes ===
- Aeronca 65-LB Super Chief (N34496), fate unknown
- American Aerolights Eagle ultralight, fate unknown
- Chanute 1896 Glider replica (Indiana Dunes Visitor Center)
- Curtiss JN-4D Jenny replica, fate unknown
- Foose Tigercat,, fate unknown
- Mong Sport biplane (N4253J), fate unknown
- Piper PA-22-135 Tri-Pacer (N8726C), fate unknown
- Wright Flyer replica, fate unknown
- Frasca International in Urbana, Illinois has reclaimed the flight simulators it had loaned to the museum.

== See also ==
- List of aerospace museums
