= Frank Elliott =

Frank Elliott may refer to:

- Frank Elliott (police officer) (1874–1939), assistant commissioner of the London Metropolitan Police
- Frank R. Elliott (1877–1931), hardware merchant and political figure in Nova Scotia, Canada
- Frank Elliott (actor) (1880–1970), English actor
- Frank Elliott (cyclist) (1911–1964), Canadian Olympic cyclist
- Frank Elliott (racing driver) (1891–1959), American racecar driver
- Frank Worth Elliott Jr. (1924–1997), United States Air Force general
- Frank Elliott (footballer) (1929–2018), Welsh footballer who played for Fulham, Mansfield Town and Stoke City
