= Senator Weatherford =

Senator Weatherford may refer toL

- James K. Weatherford (1850–1935), Oregon State Senate
- Zadoc L. Weatherford (1888–1983), Alabama State Senate
- Chuck Weaver (born 1956), Illinois State Senate
- Isaac Weaver Jr. (1756–1830), Pennsylvania State Senate
- Richard Weaver (American politician) (1827–1906), Wisconsin State Senate
- Stanley B. Weaver (1925–2003), Illinois State Senate
- Zebulon Weaver (1872–1948), North Carolina State Senate
