= 2022 Illinois State Treasurer election =

Illinois Treasurer election, 2022
- November 8, 2022
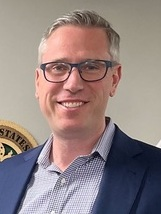

Nominee	Mike Frerichs	Tom Demmer
Party	Democratic	Republican
Popular vote	2,206,434	1,767,242
Percentage	54.29%	43.48%
- Frerichs: 40–50% 50–60% 60–70% 70–80% 80–90% Demmer: 40–50% 50–60% 60–70% 70–80% 80–90%
Treasurer before election
Mike Frerichs
Democratic
Elected Treasurer
Mike Frerichs
Democratic

The 2022 Illinois State Treasurer election was held on November 8, 2022, to elect the treasurer of Illinois. Incumbent Mike Frerichs won re-election to a third term.

== Democratic primary ==
=== Candidates ===
==== Nominee ====
- Mike Frerichs, incumbent treasurer

=== Endorsements ===
Mike Frerichs

Organizations

- Equality Illinois
- Illinois AFL–CIO
- International Union of Operating Engineers Local 150

=== Results ===
Democratic primary results
Party	Candidate	Votes	%
Democratic	Mike Frerichs (incumbent)	811,732	100.0%
Total votes		811,732	100.0%

== Republican primary ==
=== Candidates ===
==== Nominee ====
- Tom Demmer, state representative from the 90th district (2013–present)

==== Disqualified ====
- Patrice McDermand

=== Results ===
Republican primary results
Party	Candidate	Votes	%
Republican	Tom Demmer	670,758	100.0%
Total votes		670,758	100.0%

== Third parties and independents ==
=== Candidates ===
==== Declared ====
- Preston Nelson (Libertarian)

== General election ==
=== Post-primary endorsements ===
Mike Frerichs (D)

Labor unions

- United Mine Workers

=== Polling ===
Poll source	Date(s) administered	Sample size (Note: Key: A – all adults RV – registered voters LV – likely voters V – unclear)	Margin of error	Mike Frerichs (D)	Tom Demmer (R)	Other	Undecided
Emerson College	October 20–24, 2022	1,000 (LV)	± 3.0%	46%	36%	6% (Note: Nelson (L) with 4%; "Someone else" with 2%)	14%
Victory Geek (D)	August 25–28, 2022	512 (LV)	± 4.3%	54%	33%	–	13%

=== Results ===
2022 Illinois State Treasurer election
Party	Candidate	Votes	%	±%
Democratic	Mike Frerichs (incumbent)	2,206,434	54.29%	−3.35%
Republican	Tom Demmer	1,767,242	43.48%	+4.57%
Libertarian	Preston Nelson	90,647	2.23%	−1.22%
Write-in		38	0.0%	±0.0%
Total votes		4,064,361	100.0%	
Democratic hold				

==== By congressional district ====
Frerichs won 14 of 17 congressional districts.

District	Frerichs	Demmer	Representative
1st	67%	31%	Bobby Rush (117th Congress)
1st	67%	31%	Jonathan Jackson (118th Congress)
2nd	67%	31%	Robin Kelly
3rd	67%	31%	Marie Newman (117th Congress)
3rd	67%	31%	Delia Ramirez (118th Congress)
4th	68%	30%	Chuy García
5th	67%	31%	Mike Quigley
6th	52%	46%	Sean Casten
7th	84%	14%	Danny Davis
8th	53%	44%	Raja Krishnamoorthi
9th	70%	29%	Jan Schakowsky
10th	59%	39%	Brad Schneider
11th	53%	45%	Bill Foster
12th	26%	72%	Mike Bost
13th	55%	43%	Nikki Budzinski
14th	51%	47%	Lauren Underwood
15th	31%	67%	Mary Miller
16th	35%	62%	Darin LaHood
17th	49%	48%	Cheri Bustos (117th Congress)
17th	49%	48%	Eric Sorensen (118th Congress)
