= Wilhelm Weber =

Wilhelm Weber may refer to:

- Wilhelm Eduard Weber (1804–1891), German physicist
- Wilhelm Weber (gymnast) (1880–1963), German Olympic gymnast
- Wilhelm Weber (SS officer) (1918–1980), Waffen-SS officer
- Willi Weber (Wilhelm Friedrich Weber, born 1942), motorsport manager

== See also ==
- William Weber (disambiguation)
