= Tom Demmer =

American politician

Member of the Illinois House of Representatives from the 90th district
- In office January 2013 – January 11, 2023
- Preceded by: Jerry L. Mitchell
- Succeeded by: John Cabello (redistricted)

Personal details
- Born: Thomas Michael Demmer; August 3, 1986 (age 40) Dixon, Illinois, U.S.
- Party: Republican
- Spouse: Rebecca Bach
- Education: University of Dayton (BA)
- Website: Campaign website

Thomas Michael "Tom" Demmer (born August 3, 1986) is a Republican member of the Illinois House of Representatives representing the 90th district from 2013 to 2023. The 90th district, located in northwestern Illinois included parts of Lee County, Ogle County, LaSalle County, and DeKalb County.

== Education and career ==
Demmer was born and raised in Dixon, Illinois, where he continues to live with his wife. He attended St. Anne School, Newman Central Catholic High School, and the University of Dayton, where he earned a Bachelor of Arts degree in communications with a minor in political science.

He was a White House intern in the Office of the Vice President of the United States in 2006. For a time, Demmer was Director of Innovation & Strategy at KSB Hospital. From 2008 to 2012, he was a member of the Lee County Board of Commissioners.

In 2023, he became Executive Director of the Lee County Industrial Development Association. The Lee County Industrial Development Association is a not-for-profit organization whose mission is to promote, develop, and facilitate industrial, commercial, and business enterprises in Lee County

== Illinois House of Representatives ==
Demmer was a top Illinois House Republican who served as Deputy Republican Leader from 2018 to 2023. Demmer was the chief budget negotiator for the Illinois House Republicans, and was the caucus leader on Medicaid and healthcare policy issues.

Previously, Demmer was Republican Conference Chairman from January 2017 to July 2018. He was a member of the Joint Committee on Administrative Rules from 2016 to 2023.

Demmer was the Republican Spokesperson on the Special Investigating Committee II in 2020 to investigate the conduct of Michael Madigan, the then-Speaker of the Illinois House of Representatives, who was later indicted by a federal grand jury on 22 counts of racketeering and bribery in connection with alleged corruption schemes.

Demmer served as an Illinois co-chair for the John Kasich's 2016 presidential campaign.

In the 2022 general election, Demmer ran for Illinois Treasurer. Demmer lost the election to incumbent Mike Frerichs.

== Electoral history ==
Illinois Treasurer, 2022
Party	Candidate	Votes	%
Democratic	Michael Frerichs (incumbent)	2,134,658	53.8
Republican	Tom Demmer	1,744,391	44.0
Libertarian	Preston Nelson	88,069	2.2
Total votes		3,967,118	100.0

90th District, Illinois House of Representatives, 2020
Party	Candidate	Votes	%
Republican	Tom Demmer (incumbent)	34,129	67.3
Democratic	Seth Wiggins	16,589	32.7
Total votes		50,718	100.0

90th District, Illinois House of Representatives, 2018
Party	Candidate	Votes	%
Republican	Tom Demmer (incumbent)	23,690	61.2
Democratic	Amy Davis	15,030	38.8
Total votes		38,720	100.0

90th District, Illinois House of Representatives, 2016
Party	Candidate	Votes	%
Republican	Tom Demmer (incumbent)	40,456	100
Total votes		40,456	100.0

90th District, Illinois House of Representatives, 2014
Party	Candidate	Votes	%
Republican	Tom Demmer (incumbent)	28,668	100
Total votes		28,668	100.0

90th District, Illinois House of Representatives, 2012
Party	Candidate	Votes	%
Republican	Tom Demmer	27,442	62.1
Democratic	Thomas Boken, Jr.	16,724	37.9
Total votes		44,166	100.0

Party political offices
Preceded by Jim Dodge	Republican nominee for Treasurer of Illinois; 2022	Succeeded by Max Solomon
