= William Weber =

William Weber may refer to:

- William Alfred Weber (1918–2020), American botanist
- William Gilmore Weber (born 1963), American guitarist, former member of rock band The Murder Junkies
- William V. Weber (1901–1989), Michigan State Representative
- Ben Weber (composer) (William Jennings Bryan Weber, 1916–1979), American composer
- Bill Weber (Minnesota politician) (born 1956), Minnesota State Senator
- Bill Weber (New York politician) (born 1969), New York State Senator
- Bill Weber (1957–2024), American sports commentator
- Wilhelm Eduard Weber (1804–1891), German physicist

== See also ==
- William Webber (disambiguation)
- Wilhelm Weber (disambiguation)
