= Rick Winkel =

American politician

Member of the Illinois Senate from the 52nd district
- In office January 2003 – January 2007
- Preceded by: Stanley B. Weaver
- Succeeded by: Mike Frerichs

Member of the Illinois House of Representatives from the 103rd district
- In office January 1995 – January 2003
- Preceded by: Laurel Lunt Prussing
- Succeeded by: Naomi Jakobsson

Personal details
- Born: September 25, 1956 (age 70) Kankakee, Illinois, U.S.
- Party: Republican
- Education: University of Illinois (B.A.); DePaul University (J.D.)
- Profession: Attorney

Richard J. Winkel (born September 25, 1956) is an American politician and lawyer.

== Early life and education ==
Born in Kankakee, Illinois, Winkel received his bachelor's degree in economics at University of Illinois at Urbana–Champaign and his J.D. degree at DePaul University College of Law. He practiced law first in Bourbonnais, Illinois and later in Champaign, Illinois.

== Career in politics ==
In 1992, he was elected to the Champaign County Board. In 1994, he was elected to the Illinois House of Representatives, defeating one term incumbent Laurel Lunt Prussing. From 1995 to 2003, Winkel served in the Illinois House of Representatives as a Republican. In 2002, he defeated Democrat and former Champaign mayor Dan McCollum to succeed longtime Senator Stanley B. Weaver in the Illinois Senate. He served in the Illinois Senate for one term from 2003 to 2007.

Winkel is the director of the Office of Public Leadership at the University of Illinois' Institute of Government and Public Affairs. In 2012, Winkel ran for the Republican nomination for Champaign County Circuit Clerk, but withdrew before the primary to take a job with the University of Illinois at Urbana-Champaign.

On April 26, 2010, Senate Minority Leader Christine Radogno appointed Winkel to the Illinois Plain Language Task Force. The task force was assembled to conduct a study and propose legislative measures designed to realize: (1) the potential benefits of incorporating plain language in State government documents, statutes, and contracts; and (2) how plain language principles might be incorporated into the statutes governing contracts among private parties so as to provide additional protections to Illinois consumers, to reduce litigation between private parties over the meaning of contractual terms, and to foster judicial economy.
