= Museum of Missouri Military History =

- Location within Missouri
- Established: April 1999
- Location: Jefferson City, Missouri
- Coordinates: 38.5494°N 92.0728°W
- Type: Military museum
- Director: Charles Machon

The Museum of Missouri Military History is in Jefferson City, Missouri.

== History ==
The museum opened in April 1999 in a two-story building at the Ike Skelton Training Site. However, after 13 years the collection had become to large to display in the 1,000 sq ft (93 m^{2}) space and the museum announced plans to move. It began relocating to a series of 6,400 sq ft (590 m^{2}) maintenance bays adjacent to the Missouri National Guard headquarters in 2013. The museum held a grand opening in the new space on 7 December 2014.

In the following years the museum received several aircraft for display, including an F-4 in August 2015 and a C-130 from the closed Octave Chanute Aerospace Museum in May 2016. The latter was repainted in European camouflage in July 2017.

== Exhibits ==
Temporary exhibits at the museum have covered subjects such as African-Americans in the military, military food and military toys.

== Collection ==
=== Aircraft ===
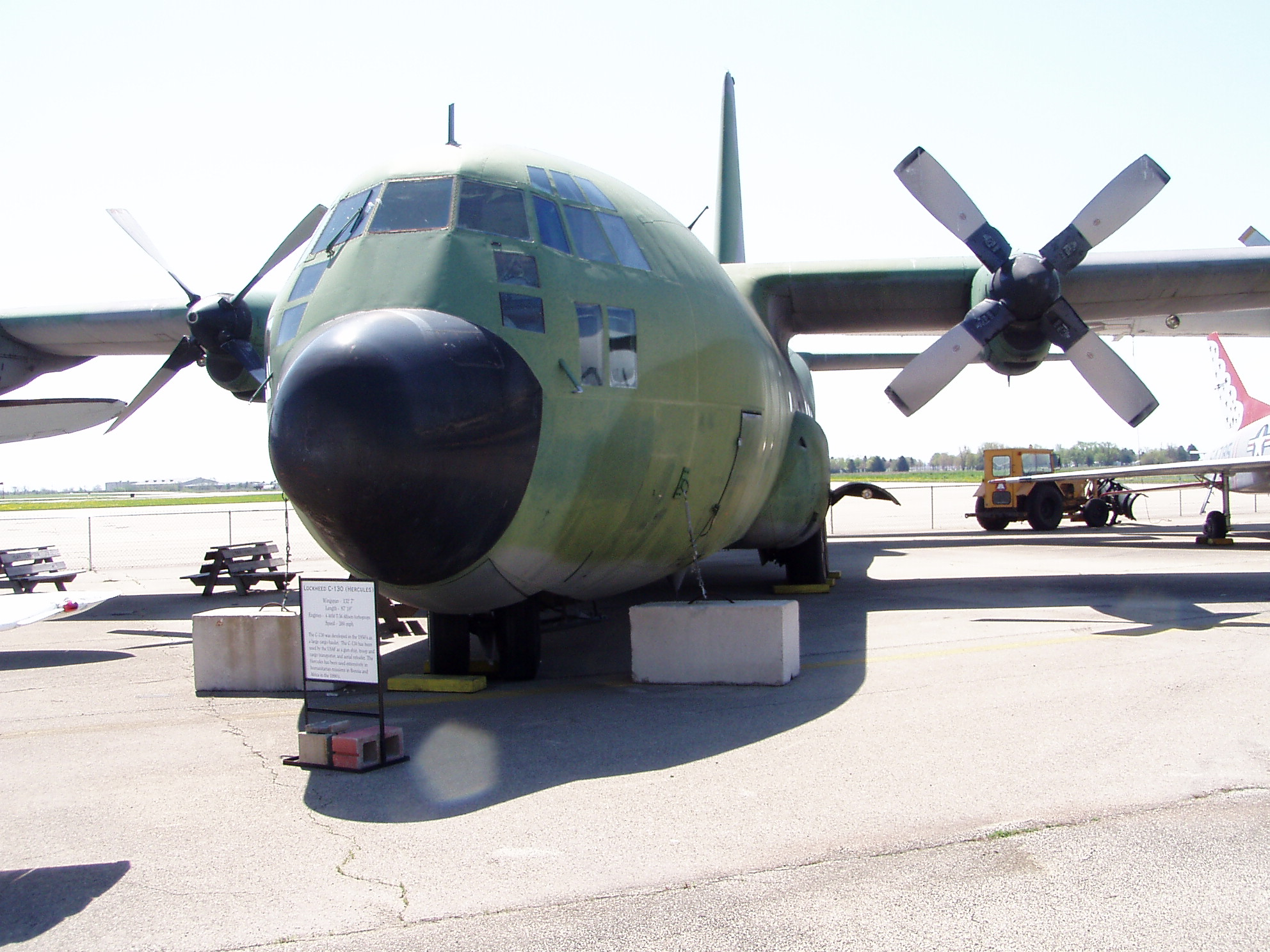
The museum's C-130A was previously on display at the Octave Chanute Aerospace Museum.

- Bell AH-1F Cobra
- Bell GUH-1H Iroquois
- Lockheed GC-130A Hercules
- McDonnell Douglas F-4E Phantom II
- McDonnell Douglas F-15A Eagle

=== Ground vehicles ===
- 1927 Chrysler staff car
- M4E8 Sherman
- M113
- M551 Sheridan
- M901
- Willys M38A1

=== Other ===
- M1841 6-pounder field gun
- World War I anti-aircraft gun

== Events ==
The museum holds a Veterans Appreciation Weekend twice annually around Memorial Day and Veterans Day, with reenactors and recreations of military life.
