= Chanute Air Force Base =

Former USAF base in Champaign County, Illinois

Chanute Air Force Base Chanute Field
- Located in Rantoul, Illinois
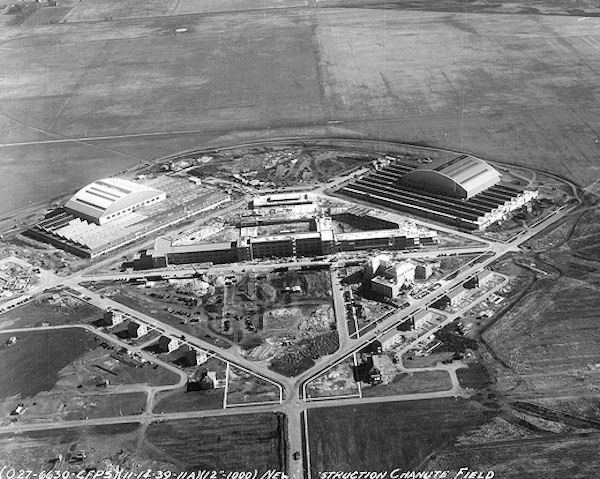
- Chanute Field, Illinois, 12 November 1939. Note the lack of concrete runways.

Site information
- Type: Air Force base
- Controlled by: United States Air Force; Air Training Command

Location
- Coordinates: 40°17′40″N 88°08′35″W

Site history
- Built: 1917
- In use: 1917–1993
- Battles/wars: World War I World War II

Garrison information
- Garrison: 3345th Air Base Group (1948–1993)
- Chanute Field Historic District
- U.S. National Register of Historic Places
- U.S. Historic district
- Location within Illinois
- Location: Rantoul National Aviation Center, Rantoul, Illinois
- Area: 90 acres (36 ha)
- Architect: U.S. Army Quartermaster General; et.al.
- Architectural style: Late Gothic Revival, Art Deco
- NRHP reference No.: 06000594
- Added to NRHP: July 14, 2006

Chanute Air Force Base is a decommissioned United States Air Force facility, located in Champaign County, Illinois, south of and adjacent to Rantoul, Illinois, about 130 miles (210 km) south of Chicago. Its primary mission throughout its existence was Air Force technical training. Chanute Field was established on 21 May 1917, being one of thirty-two Air Service training camps established after the United States entry into World War I.

The base was closed in 1993 and is currently being redeveloped for civilian uses.

== Octave Chanute ==
Chanute Field was named in honor of Octave Chanute (1832–1910), a pioneer aeronautical engineer and experimenter, a friend and adviser to the Wright Brothers. Chanute's biplane glider (1896) with "two arched wings held rigidly together by vertical struts and diagonal wire bracing" (the principle of the Pratt truss used in the railroad bridges which Chanute constructed) served as a prototype design for airplanes.

== History ==
=== World War I ===
To increase U.S. air strength after its late entry to World War I in 1917, Congress appropriated $640 million to build up the Air Service. The War Department immediately opened ground schools at eight colleges and established twenty-seven flying fields to train pilots. The War Department selected Rantoul because it was one of the few level sites in Illinois in close proximity to the Illinois Central Railroad and the ground school at the University of Illinois. The village of Rantoul would also be a source for electricity and water.

The contract to build Chanute Field was given to English Brothers Construction of Champaign, Illinois on 22 May 1917, with the expectation that construction would be complete in 60 days. Building material began arriving on site on 25 May, and work began in earnest on 4 June. At its peak construction, 2,000 men, 200 teams of horses, 3 steam shovels and multiple steam tractors were working on Chanute Field, with a weekly payroll reaching US$96,000 (equivalent to about $2,412,000 in 2025).

The construction of Chanute Field was an economic boom for the small town of Rantoul; money and people flowed into the village at a rapid rate, with both workers and visitors coming to see the large construction spectacle. Chanute Field's first commander, Captain Charles C. Benedict, arrived in late June, and on 4 July, the first airplanes arrived at the new facility.

Major James L. Dunsworth arrived on 15 July 1917 and took command. He immediately ordered flight training to begin on 17 July, at which point Curtiss JN-4 "Jenny" trainers began flying from dawn until dusk.

The airfield was completed on 22 July 1917 at a cost of about $1 million, and was officially accepted by the Air Service on 31 July. Starting on 20 August, the field had to be closed to visitors who had become a distraction to the pilots and the operation of the training school.

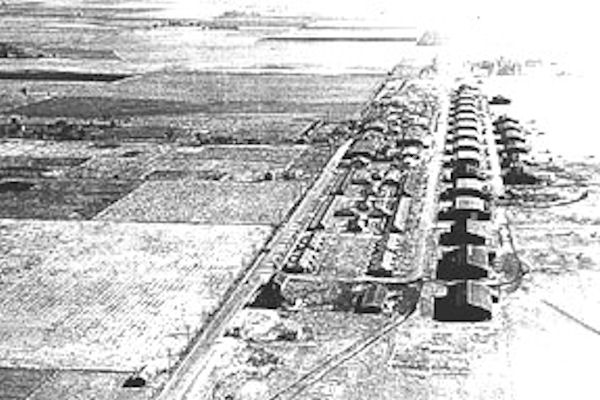
Chanute Field, 1918

Chanute Field was an Air Service primary flying school, offering an eight-week course to new aviation cadets. It had a maximum student capacity of 300. By the end of the war, the training units assigned there were:

- Post Headquarters, Chanute Field – December 1919
- 38th Aero Squadron, August 1917–

Re-designated as Squadron "A", July–December 1918

- 112th Aero Squadron (II), May 1918

Re-designated as Squadron "B", July–December 1918

- 203d Aero Squadron (II), March 1918

Re-designated as Squadron "C", July–December 1918

- 287th Aero Squadron (Service), June 1918

Re-designated as Squadron "D", July–December 1918

- 288th Aero Squadron, June 1918

Re-designated as Squadron "E", July–December 1918

- Flying School Detachment (Consolidation of Squadrons A–D), December 1918 – November 1919

As World War I ended in November 1918, Chanute Field had trained several thousand pilots, and pilot training ended. In December, the last Aero Squadrons were demobilized and the airplanes flown out to other airfields. The base became a storage depot for OX-5 aircraft engines and paint, with a staff of about 30 personnel.

=== Inter-war period ===
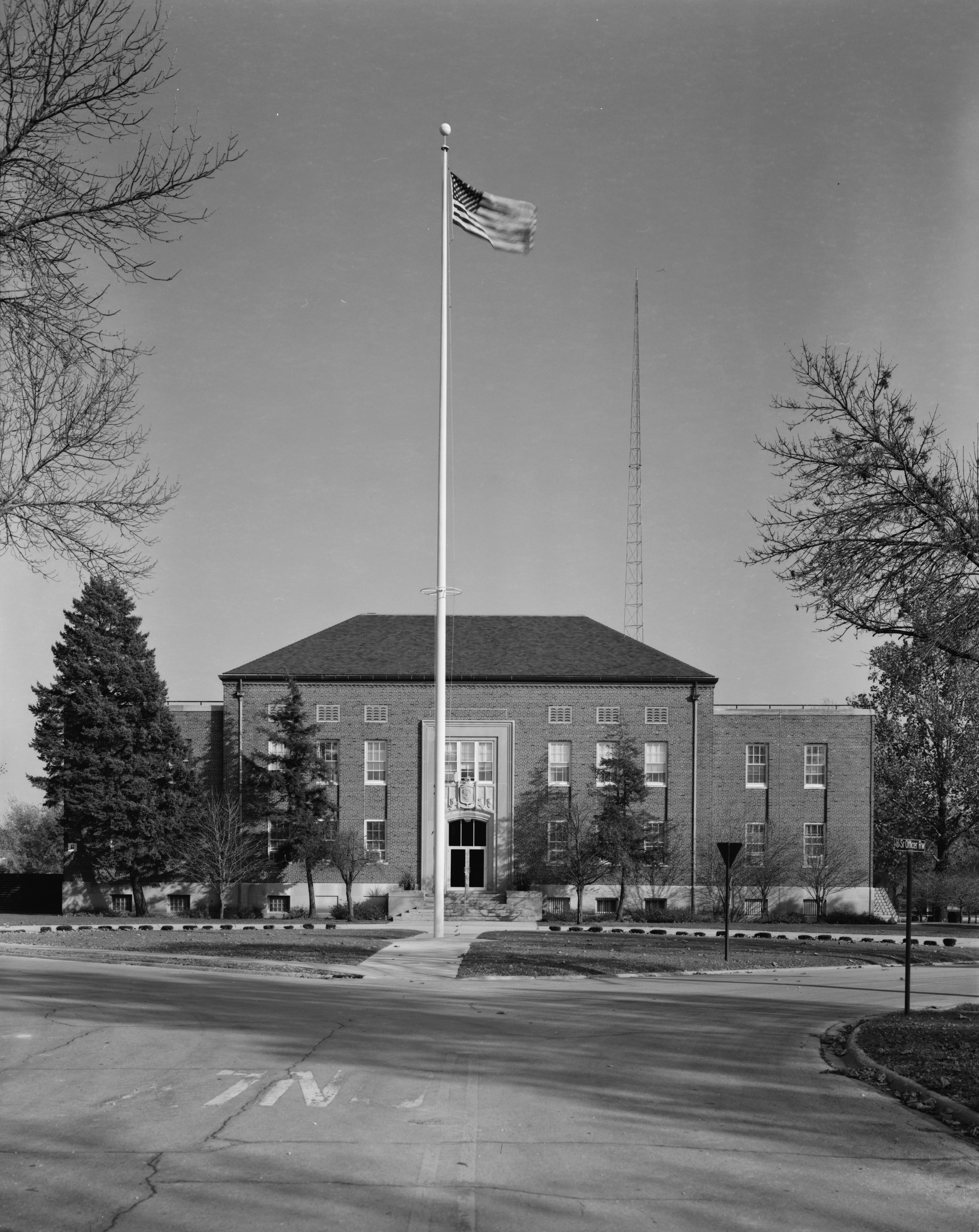
Chanute Air Force Base Headquarters and Administrative Building

When World War I ended in November 1918, the Army Air Service, along with the rest of the Army, faced crucial reductions. Thousands of officers and enlisted men were released, leaving only 10,000 men to fly and repair the planes and engines left over from the war. Hundreds of small flying fields closed, forcing consolidation of supply and aviation repair depots.

In November 1918, the first talk of base closure occurred and in August 1919, the recommendation was made in Washington to close Chanute Field. However, on 11 February 1920 Congress approved funding to buy Chanute Field. The state of the facility, however, was less than optimal. The facility was constructed rapidly due to the pressing need to train pilots during World War I, and by 1920, the facility was falling into disrepair. On 4 January 1921, Chanute was given a mission and the Air Service Mechanics School was transferred to Chanute from Kelly Field, Texas, followed by the entire Air Corps Training School.

In 1922 the photography school at Langley Field, Virginia and the communications school at Fort Sill, Oklahoma, both joined the mechanics course at Chanute, grouping all technical training in the Air Service at that location.

In 1922, funds were appropriated to construct nine steel hangars on the south edge of the original 1917 airfield. The completion of Hangar 10 in 1923 represented the last major construction at Chanute until 1938. By 1923 these nine hangars had been converted to classrooms. The three previously autonomous schools consolidated to form the Air Service Technical School, re-designated the Air Corps Technical School in 1926, with the former separate schools becoming "Departments". From 1922 to 1938, Chanute Field provided all technical training for the U.S. Army Air Corps.

Chanute Field's "Great Renaissance", as the period came to be known, brought the construction of many new buildings. Since most of the base was of wooden construction, the threat of fire became Chanute's greatest enemy during the early thirties. After several fires the Army Air Corps named Chanute as one of four bases to be rebuilt.

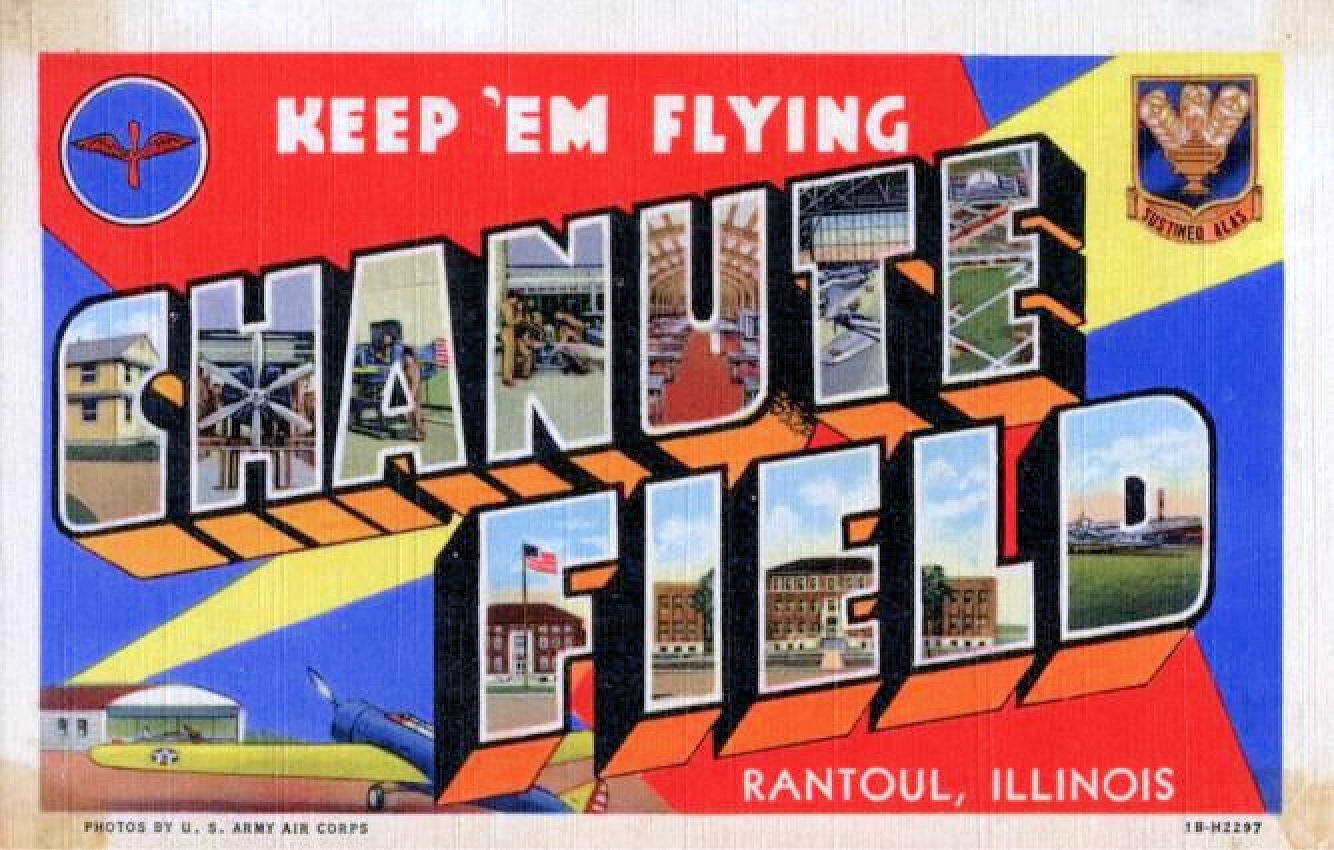
Chanute Air Force Base – 1940s postcard

In late summer 1938 work began on two massive hangars. By the following year the headquarters building, hospital, warehouses, barracks, officers' quarters, test cells, a fire station, and a 300,000 gallon water tower were all finished. The total expenditure amounted to $13.8 million with most of it being funded by President Roosevelt's Works Progress Administration (WPA). Two additional hangars, theaters, numerous barracks and family housing units, a gymnasium, and a network of concrete runways were also added. These projects were completed in 1941, just months before Pearl Harbor.

Scott Field, Illinois, came under the jurisdiction of the Chanute school in 1939. The Department of Basic Instruction, inaugurated in 1935 at Chanute, relocated to the new location. The department returned to Chanute, however, when Scott became a radio school in 1940. Four of the departments—mechanics, communications, photography, and armament—taught both officers and enlisted personnel.

The commandant of the Air Corps Technical School at Chanute had final authority for curricular development and supervised technical training in all Air Corps schools, but he lacked command authority over the schools and the installations where they were located. To rectify this problem, the Air Corps established the Technical Training Command on 26 March 1941, headquartered at Chanute Field. The new command was responsible for the orientation, classification, basic, and technical training of enlisted men and the training of non-rated officers at officer candidate and officer training schools and in technical subjects like armament, engineering, communications, and photography. The headquarters of the new command moved from Chanute to Tulsa, Oklahoma, in 1941.

=== World War II ===
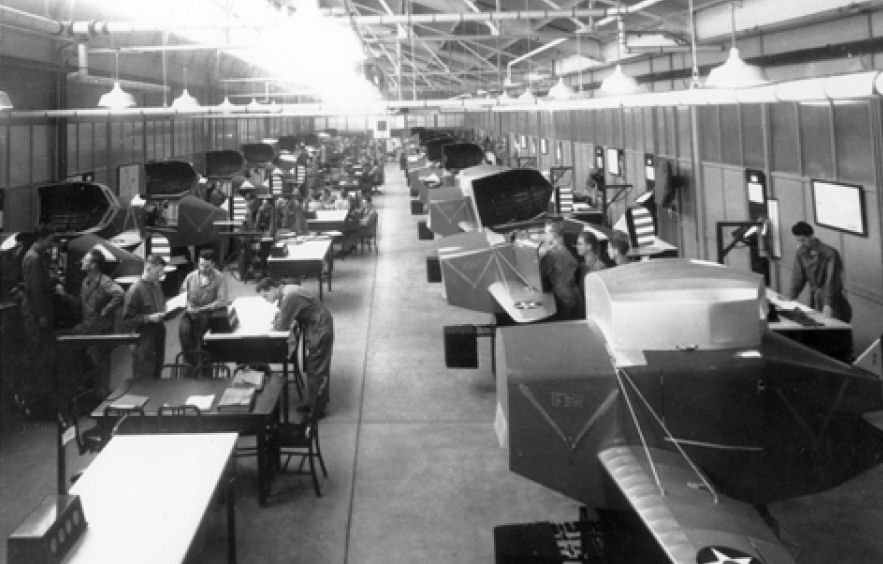
Rows of Link trainers fill this Chanute Field, Illinois, classroom in 1943. These trainers were used to teach both Link trainer operators and maintenance technicians.

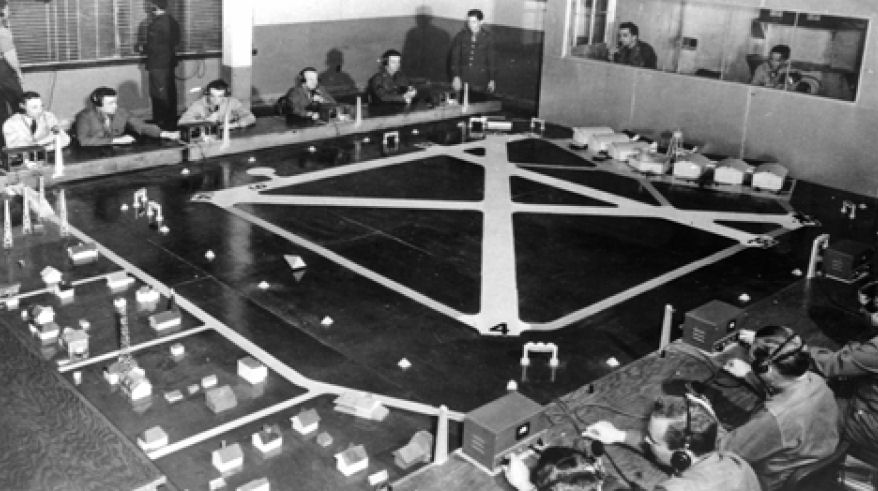
The Control Tower Operator Course at Chanute Field used a model airport and a full-scale mockup control tower, shown above.

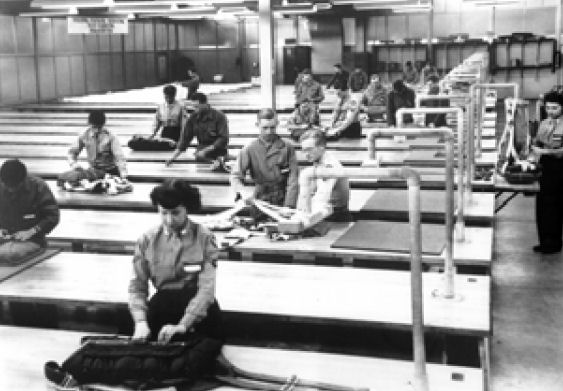
Enlisted personnel learn how to pack parachutes at Chanute Field.

Chanute Army Air Field photo pictorial

With Japan's attack on Pearl Harbor in December 1941, citizens flocked to Chanute Field in large numbers to enlist in the U.S. Army Air Forces. Chanute's transition from peace to war became apparent immediately following Japan's surprise attack. The technical training mission remained; however, a massive influx of new recruits and volunteers led to a critical housing shortage. The new 15,000-man quarters built during Chanute's "Great Renaissance" proved insufficient to accommodate the large influx of new personnel. Many soldiers were housed temporarily in large tents. Chanute's student load continued to grow until it reached a peak of 25,000 in January 1943.

The Women's Army Corps School was established in early 1944. Along with the military at Chanute, the city of Rantoul mobilized during the war, with family opening their homes on holidays and aggressively participating in war bond and defense stamp drives. To help provide recreational opportunities for the large number of students at Chanute, local organizations such as the St. Malachy Catholic Church and Masonic Lodge opened servicemen's centers.

Army Air Forces Training Command (AAFTC) moved helicopter training to Chanute Field at the end of 1944 so it could consolidate the flying training operation with helicopter mechanic training. Helicopter pilot training remained at Chanute until 1 June 1945 when it transferred to Sheppard Field, Texas.

After September 1945, Chanute Field became a primary separation center for the armed forces, processing about 100 men per day from the armed forces back to civilian life.

==== Tuskegee Airmen ====
On 22 March 1941, the first all-black fighter squadron was activated at Chanute Field. Formed without pilots with the purpose of training the officer corps and ground support personnel, the 99th Pursuit Squadron was the first unit of what popularly became known as the Tuskegee Airmen. Over 250 enlisted men were trained at Chanute in aircraft ground support trades such as airplane mechanics, supply clerks, armorers, and weather forecasters. This small number of enlisted men was to become the core of other black squadrons forming at Tuskegee Field and Maxwell Field in Alabama—the famed Tuskegee Airmen.

=== United States Air Force ===
Following World War II, on 14 January 1948, Chanute Field became Chanute Air Force Base with the establishment of the United States Air Force as a separate military service. At this time, Chanute was also undergoing a major technological shift with the introduction and adoption of jet engines and the required technical curricula to support them. One of the first generalized courses was airplane and engine mechanic, jet propulsion, which opened at Chanute on 17 September. By mid-1948 this course made up almost 50 percent of Chanute's student body.

In October 1949, Air Training Command organized the 3499th Training Aids Wing, the purpose of which was to provide training in the field for maintenance personnel assigned to work on various types of aircraft in general use in the Air Force. By 1 January 1950, the wing possessed 37 detachments: 15 bomber, 7 cargo, and 15 fighter. This unit, which eventually grew to over 170 detachments, was to become the nucleus of a new field training program at Air Force Bases worldwide. Effective 24 June 1957, ATC discontinued the 3499th Mobile Training Wing and activated the 3499th Field Training Wing at Chanute. The new wing operated the command's extensive field training program. Effective 1 September 1959, ATC discontinued the 3499th Field Training Wing when ATC decided that there would be less duplication of effort if field training responsibilities were reassigned to the technical training centers.

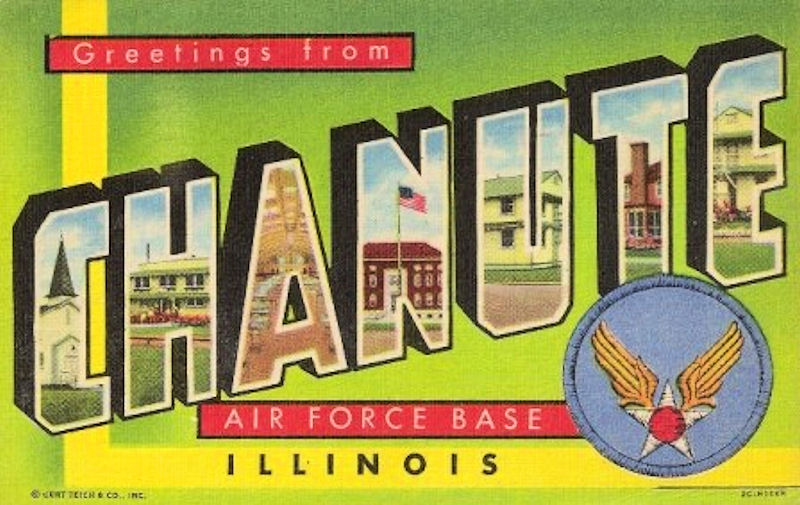
Korean War–era postcard

The North Korean invasion of South Korea on 25 June 1950 soon affected the training workload at Chanute Field. In October 1949, the student load had been 5,235 but by 1953 almost 12,000 students were at Chanute for critical training. Air Training Command also had to in-process thousands of volunteer reservists. Between late July and the end of October 1950, the command brought on active duty about 20,000 reservists. Most of this work was done at Chanute.

In early 1960, HQ USAF suggested the foreign language training program, conducted at 22 colleges and universities, be transferred from Air University control to ATC. After considerable study, the Air Force passed control of the program to ATC on 1 July. At that time, the training program covered 59 languages. Air Training Command subsequently assigned management responsibility to the Chanute Technical Training Center. This program provided language instruction for USAF personnel.

In the 1960s Chanute became the prime training center for one of the most important missile programs in history, the LGM-30 Minuteman intercontinental ballistic missile. The Minuteman ICBM became a key missile deterrent against the Soviet Union for America and her western allies. In September 1970, ATC transferred Chanute's Minuteman missile launch officer course to Vandenberg AFB, California. Beginning in the late 1960s Chanute also trained thousands of allied airmen from Asia and the Middle East.

During the 1970s Chanute provided training for thousands of USAF airmen for service in Vietnam. The base invested heavily in quality-of-life programs, building new student dormitories and other support facilities. Due to the cessation of aircraft support requirements for Chanute's training mission, the Air Force closed the base's remaining active runway in 1971. In 1977, Chanute became the prime training center for the Air-Launched Cruise Missile (ALCM). The base was also involved in the Ground-Launched Cruise Missile (GLCM) and Peacekeeper missile programs.

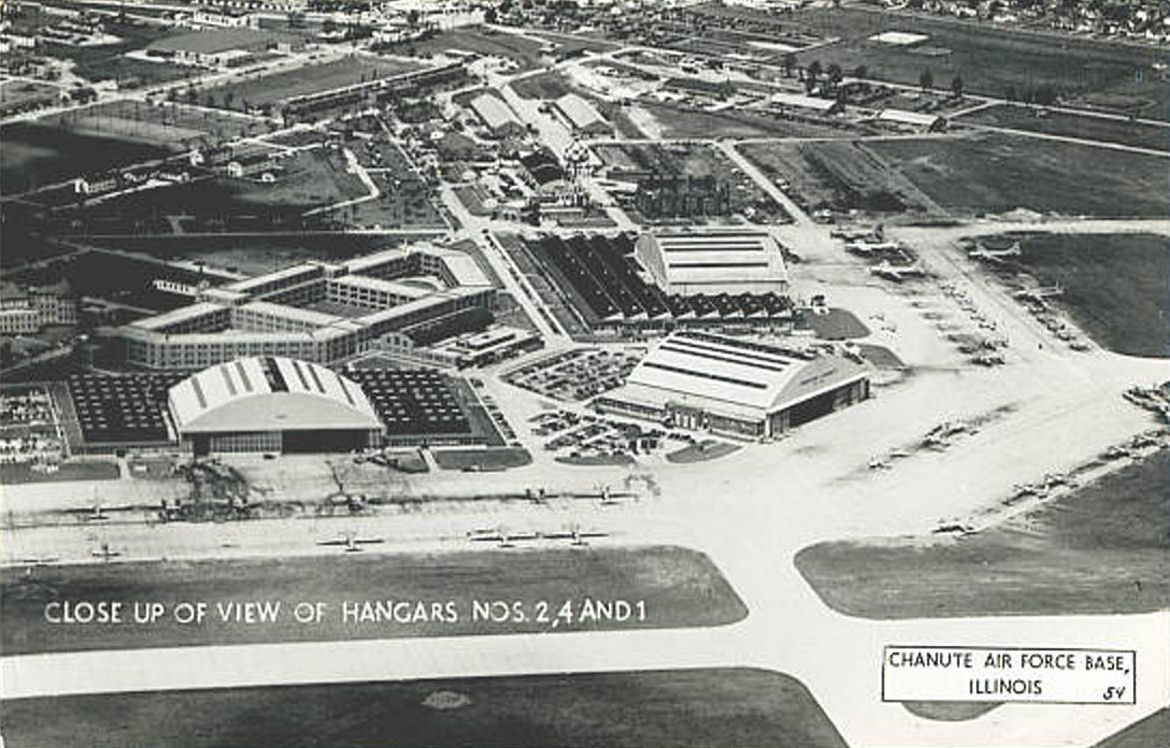
1964 base yearbook photo highlighting the flight line and aircraft hangar area

In September 1978, Air Training Command announced project Able Avionic which restructured and consolidated avionics specialists for F-111, F-15, and F-16 aircraft. With the introduction of modular F-100 engines used in the F-15 and F-16 aircraft, new Chanute training courses emerged to keep abreast of the changing equipment students would encounter in the field. The Jet Engine Branch received four J-85 engines during 1983 to familiarize students with engines used in the T-38 pilot trainer aircraft and the F-5 aggressor aircraft.

In 1982 the 928th Tactical Airlift Group proposed the establishment of drop and landing zones at Chanute. The zones would be used to conduct short-field landings and air drops to help C-130 pilots and navigators maintain proficiency. Additional benefits of the landing zone included opportunities for training experiences for students during drop operations, and increased interface between the active force and the Air Reserve Forces. Chanute's drop zone also improved contingency planning and operations.

In the three years from 1983 to 1985 Chanute training personnel worked closely with HQ USAF and ATC to restructure the Basic Jet Engine Courses to accommodate both conventional and modular engine technology. The center received four F-100 PW 200 engines and six F-110 GE 100 engines for updated training programs in 1985. Chanute's continuing drive to enhance technical training resulted in the consolidation of the Aircraft Environmental/Pneudraulics and Electrical Systems Division on July 1, 1985.

Chanute AFB eventually served as a major training facility for Air Force aircraft maintenance officers; Air Force, Navy and Marine Corps meteorology personnel (officer and enlisted); and enlisted technical training for Air Force fire fighters, aircraft maintenance, flight simulator maintenance, fuel system maintenance and ICBM missile maintenance.

Chanute AFB also contained training ICBM launch facility ("silos") for Minuteman ICBM maintenance personnel. These training facilities were housed at a hangar located on the flight line. After the deactivation of Chanute AFB, ICBM maintenance training was transferred to Vandenberg SFB, California.

An Air Force Technical Training Instructors Course was conducted as well. Additionally, Chanute AFB was the site for training USAF firefighters, life support specialists (ejection seat, aircrew survival equipment, aerospace ground equipment {AGE}, etc.), welders, non-destructive inspection (of materials), airframe repair and most of vehicle maintenance (general purpose, special purpose, fire truck maintenance, materiel handling equipment maintenance) technical schools.

=== Closure ===
On 29 December 1988 the Department of Defense recommended Chanute's closure as part of the 1988 Base Realignment and Closure Commission. The subject of base closure had been considered numerous times during Chanute's 75-year history. The end of the Cold War and the reduced threat of future conflicts prompted the government to downsize the armed forces.

In October 2023, U.S. Air Force representatives joined Village of Rantoul leaders and residents, and other state and federal officials to celebrate 106 years of partnership, support and friendship during a ceremony marking the complete transfer of the former Chanute Air Force Base back to the community.

=== Facility names ===
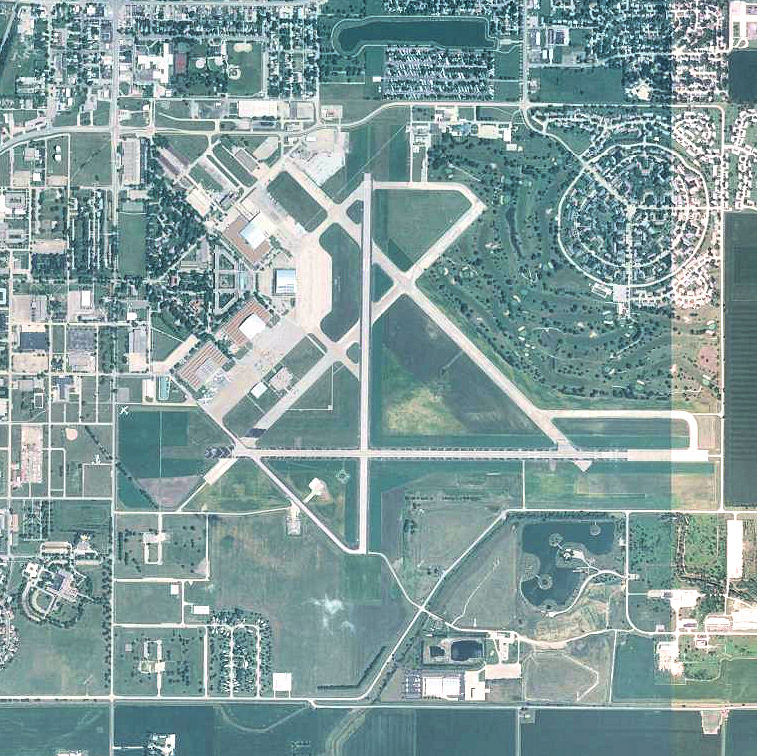
US Geological Survey photograph of the former Chanute Air Force Base, 2008

- Rantoul Aviation Field, 21 May 1917
- Chanute Field, 6 June 1917
- Chanute Air Force Base, 13 January 1948 – 30 September 1993

=== Major commands to which assigned ===
- Aviation Section, Signal Corps, July 1917
- Director of Military Aeronautics, 29 May 1918

Re-designated, Director of Air Service

- United States Army Air Service, 4 June 1920

Also Sixth Corps, United States Army, c. 1921–1940

- United States Army Air Corps, 2 July 1926
- Air Corps Technical Training Command, 26 March 1941

Re-designated: AAF Technical Training Command, March 1942

- AAF Flying Training Comd, 7 July 1943

Re-designated: AAF Training Command, 31 July 1943

- Air Training Command, 1 July 1946
- Air Education and Training Command, 1 June 1992 – 30 September 1993

=== Major units assigned ===
- Post Headquarters, Chanute Field, 6 June 1917 – March 1920
- 3rd Aviation School Squadron/16th Aero Squadron, 12 July 1917 – 4 November 1917
- 10th Aero Squadron, 7 July–November 1917
- 38th Aero Squadron/Squadron, A, Chanute Field, 25 August 1917 – 1 December 1918
- 203rd Aero Squadron/Squadron, C, Chanute Field, March 1918 – December 1918
- Air Service Mechanics School 18 April 1921 – 15 August 1973

Renamed: Air Service Technical School July 1922
Renamed: Air Corps Technical School July 1926
Renamed: Army Air Forces Technical School March 1942
Renamed: Air Force Technical School, 26 September 1947

- 15th Squadron (Observation)/15th Observation Squadron, 21 September 1921 – June 1927
- Army Air Corps Technical School, 1922

Re-designated: Headquarters Technical School, AAF

- 98th School Squadron

Re-designated: 98th Service Squadron
Re-designated: 10th Air Base Squadron
Re-designated: 10th Air Base Group
Re-designated: 13th Materiel Squadron
Re-designated: 13th Service Squadron, 1 August 1933 – 28 August 1942

- 48th School Squadron/48th Pursuit Squadron, 1 August 1933 – 1 September 1936
- 98th School Squadron/98th Service Squadron, 1 August 1933 – 1 September 1936
- Army Air Forces Technical School, 9 May 1941

Re-designated: USAF Technical School, September 1947 – 15 August 1972

- Army Air Forces Pilot School (Specialized), 15 August 1943 – 30 April 1944
- Army Air Forces Pilot School (Helicopter), 1 December 1944 – 1 June 1945
- 3502d AAF Base Unit (Technical School), 1 May 1944
- 3502d AAF Base Unit (Technical School and Helicopter School), 1 December 1944
- 3502d AAF Base Unit (Technical School), 1 June 1945
- 3345th Air Base Group, 26 August 1948 – 30 September 1993
- 3345th Technical Training Wing, 26 August 1948 – 30 September 1993
- Air Force Processing Center, Chanute, 27 September 1950 – 15 February 1978
- USAF School of Applied Aerospace Sciences, 1 August 1972 – 1 April 1977
- USAF Technical Training School, Chanute, 1 April 1977 – 30 September 1993
- Naval Technical Training Unit Chanute, UNK – 1 December 1992

=== Tenant operating units ===
- 2865th Ground Electronic Engineering-Installation Agency (GEEIA) Sq (AFLC) 1956–1970
- 1963rd Communications Squadron (Radio & Teletype communications)
- 1853rd AACS Flight Check

== Current status ==
Parts of Chanute AFB have been converted to civilian and other alternative uses. Many of the Air Force base's buildings and facilities have found new life with purposes that range from motels, retirement communities, restaurants, a fitness center, a prominent data center and several light manufacturing facilities. The golf course, once only available to service members and their guests, is now privately owned and open to the public. The housing on base, once comprising homes for airmen with families, is now occupied by civilians. Many buildings still remain unoccupied and are slowly deteriorating due to lack of maintenance. White Hall was demolished in December, 2016. Widespread use of asbestos and the discovery of toxic chemical dumps have forced the condemnation of certain parts of the former base.

The Chanute AFB airfield and its associated hangars and flight line facilities have been converted into an uncontrolled general aviation airport known as the Rantoul National Aviation Center / Frank Elliott Field. The latter title is derived from the late Major General Frank Worth Elliott Jr., USAF, former Chanute Technical Center Commander and the Village of Rantoul's Economic Development Consultant following closure of Chanute AFB. An aviation-centric museum, the Octave Chanute Aerospace Museum, was also located on the former Chanute AFB site, commemorating much of the installation's military history as Chanute Field and Chanute AFB, but it closed in the winter of 2015. In 2016 the museum's archival records, including blueprints, maps, publications, oral histories, photographs, scrapbooks, videotapes, and administrative records were sent to the Champaign County Historical Archives for public access and research. Finally, a 6-month quasi-military academy program, the Lincoln's ChalleNGe Academy, is run for troubled youths, ages 16–18, by the Illinois Army National Guard and the Illinois Air National Guard in other former Chanute AFB facilities.

Portions of the base were added to the National Register of Historic Places as the Chanute Field Historic District.

In 2019, the World Championship Punkin Chunkin announced its intent to hold that year's competition at the base.

In every odd-numbered year the base hosts the Half Century of Progress, the largest working antique tractor show in the world.

On October 25, 2023, the Department of the Air Force handed over control of the final buildings and properties to the Village of Rantoul, IL.

B-52 Hangar MX operates an indoor motocross track inside one of the large hangars at the facility.

== Post-closure environmental issues ==
Chanute has been designated an EPA Superfund site, citing areas of contamination with volatile organic compounds, SVOCs, dioxins and furans, pesticides and polychlorinated biphenyls, and metals detected in the soil and/or ground water/leachate. The State of Illinois has also documented contamination at the site.

== See also ==
- Illinois World War II Army Airfields
- Central (later Eastern) Technical Training Command
- List of Training Section Air Service airfields
