= Frank Worth Elliott Jr. =

United States Air Force general

Major General Frank Worth Elliott Jr.
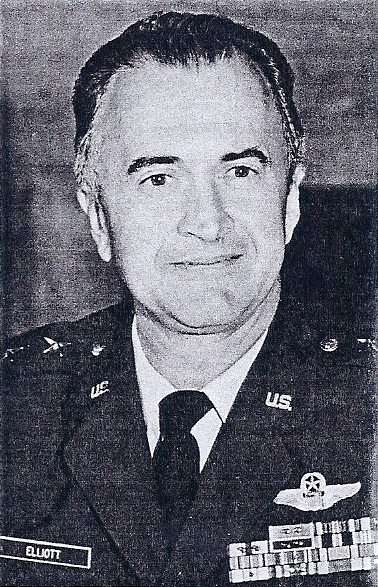
- Born: Frank Worth Elliott Jr. December 2, 1924; Statesville, North Carolina
- Died: October 20, 1997 (aged 72); Rantoul, Illinois
- Burial place: Camp Butler National Cemetery, Springfield, Illinois
- Education: Eastern Illinois University
- Military career
- Allegiance: United States of America
- Branch: United States Air Force
- Service years: 1942–1975
- Rank: Major general
- Commands: 92d Air Refueling Wing; 14th Air Division; 307th Strategic Wing; 7217th Air Division
- Conflicts: World War II; Vietnam War
- Awards: Air Force Distinguished Service Medal; Legion of Merit; Distinguished Flying Cross; Air Force Distinguished Service Medal; Air Medal; Air Force Commendation Medal

Frank Worth Elliott Jr. (December 2, 1924 – October 20, 1997) was a major general in the United States Air Force. General Elliott served in World War II as the captain of a B-24 Liberator, commander of the 14th Strategic Aerospace Division, and commander of Chanute Air Force Base in Rantoul, Illinois. Elliott also held the distinction of having piloted the SR-71 Blackbird.

During his military career, General Elliott was awarded several commendations. Among them were the Air Force Distinguished Service Medal with one oak leaf cluster, the Legion of Merit with two oak leaf clusters, the Distinguished Flying Cross., and The Order of the Sword.

Following his retirement from the USAF in 1975, General Elliott resided in Rantoul, IL. When Chanute AFB closed on September 30, 1993, General Elliott worked as an economic development consultant for the city and was instrumental in helping the city attract corporations to fill the vacuum left behind by the base closing. Following his death, Rantoul National Aviation Center was formally renamed Frank Elliott Field.

== Biography ==
Frank Worth Elliott Jr. was born in 1924, in Statesville, N.C., and graduated from high school in Catawba, North Carolina in 1941. He attended San Diego State College, California, in 1941, and Lenoir Rhyne College, North Carolina, in 1942. In December 1942 he enlisted in the U.S. Army Air Corps as an aviation cadet and received his pilot wings and commission as a second lieutenant when he completed flight training in March 1944.

During World War II, after B-24 combat crew training, General Elliott was assigned to the 449th Bombardment Group of the Fifteenth Air Force in the Mediterranean Theater of Operations and completed a combat tour of duty. He returned to the United States in June 1945 and was assigned as a flight instructor in B-17 and B-24 aircraft.

In March 1946 he was assigned to the 28th Bombardment Group (Strategic Air Command) at Grand Island, Neb., and in October 1946 went with the group to Elmendorf Field, Alaska, for a six-month tour of duty. The 28th Group returned to the United States and was assigned to Rapid City Air Force Base, S.D., where Elliott served as base supply officer and deputy director of Materiel for the 28th Bombardment Wing. From October 1948 to February 1949, he served as military observer with the United Nations Truce Observer Team in Palestine.

From February 1951 to April 1952, he attended navigator and bombardier school. He then was assigned to the 93d Bombardment Wing (Strategic Air Command) at Castle Air Force Base, Calif., where he flew B-50, B-47, and B-52 aircraft as a crewmember and served as squadron operations officer.

In May 1957 he was assigned to the 28th Bombardment Wing at Ellsworth Air Force Base, South Dakota, as chief, Air Training Branch. In April 1958 he went to Headquarters Fifteenth Air Force, March Air Force Base, Calif., where he assumed duties as chief of the Flying Training Branch, Directorate of Operations. He was transferred to Beale Air Force Base, Calif., in July 1961 where he served as deputy commander for operations for the 4126th Strategic Aerospace Wing (redesignated 456th Strategic Aerospace Wing).

From August 1964 to July 1965, he attended the National War College in Washington, D.C., and then was assigned to the War Plans Division, Directorate of Plans, Deputy Chief of Staff, Plans and Operations, Headquarters U.S. Air Force. In May 1966 he was assigned to the Office of the Vice Chief of Staff, U.S. Air Force, as deputy executive, and in May 1968 became executive. In July 1969 he assumed duties as commander, 92d Strategic Aerospace Wing at Fairchild Air Force Base, Wash. In February 1970 he returned to Beale Air Force Base, Calif., as commander, 14th Strategic Aerospace Division.

In July 1971 he became commander of the 307th Strategic Wing, U-Tapao Royal Thai Air Force Base, Thailand. The wing was composed of B-52 strategic bombers and KC-135 tankers.

From August 1972 until July 1974, General Elliott was commander of the Chanute Technical Training Center at Chanute Air Force Base, Ill., one of the major technical training centers in the U.S. Air Force. While at Chanute he received a bachelor of arts degree in social sciences from Eastern Illinois University, Charleston, Ill.

Elliott assumed command of The United States Logistics Group at Ankara, Turkey, in September 1974 until his retirement in 1975.

== Awards and decorations ==
His awards include:

USAF Command pilot badge
Air Force Distinguished Service Medal
Legion of Merit with two bronze oak leaf clusters
Distinguished Flying Cross
Air Medal with four bronze oak leaf clusters
Air Force Commendation Medal
Army Commendation Medal
Presidential Unit Citation
Air Force Outstanding Unit Award with valor device
American Campaign Medal
European-African-Middle Eastern Campaign Medal with three bronze campaign stars
World War II Victory Medal
National Defense Service Medal with service star
Vietnam Service Medal with two bronze campaign stars
Air Force Longevity Service Award with silver and bronze oak leaf clusters
Vietnam Air Force Distinguished Service Order (1st Class)
Vietnam Gallantry Cross, with palm
Vietnam Air Service Medal (Honor Class)
Republic of Vietnam Gallantry Cross Unit Citation
Vietnam Campaign Medal
