= Rantoul Township, Champaign County, Illinois =

Rantoul Township
- Township
- Location in Champaign County

- Champaign County's location in Illinois
- Coordinates: 40°16′22″N 88°09′56″W
- Country: United States
- State: Illinois
- County: Champaign
- Established: November 8, 1859

Area
  - Total: 49.64 sq mi (128.6 km^{2})
  - Land: 49.54 sq mi (128.3 km^{2})
  - Water: 0.11 sq mi (0.28 km^{2}) 0.22%
- Elevation: 728 ft (222 m)

Population (2020)
  - Total: 10,705
  - Density: 216.1/sq mi (83.43/km^{2})
- Time zone: UTC-6 (CST)
  - Summer (DST): UTC-5 (CDT)
- FIPS code: 17-019-62796

Rantoul Township is a township in Champaign County, Illinois, USA. As of the 2020 census, its population was 10,705 and it contained 4,778 housing units.

== Geography ==
Rantoul is Township 21 North, Range 9 East and part of Range 10 East of the Third Principal Meridian.

According to the 2010 census, the township has a total area of 49.64 square miles (128.6 km^{2}), of which 49.54 square miles (128.3 km^{2}) (or 99.80%) is land and 0.11 square miles (0.28 km^{2}) (or 0.22%) is water.

=== Cities and towns ===
- Rantoul (south three-quarters)
- Thomasboro

=== Cemeteries ===
The township contains five cemeteries: Beckman, Eden, Elizabeth, Elmwood and Saint Elizabeth.

=== Major highways ===
- Interstate 57
- U.S. Route 45
- U.S. Route 136

=== Airports and landing strips ===
- Schmidt Airport

== Demographics ==
As of the 2020 census there were 10,705 people, 4,074 households, and 2,433 families residing in the township. The population density was 215.64 inhabitants per square mile (83.26/km^{2}). There were 4,778 housing units at an average density of 96.25 per square mile (37.16/km^{2}). The racial makeup of the township was 58.44% White, 20.13% African American, 0.59% Native American, 1.00% Asian, 0.08% Pacific Islander, 8.53% from other races, and 11.23% from two or more races. Hispanic or Latino of any race were 15.78% of the population.

There were 4,074 households, out of which 31.60% had children under the age of 18 living with them, 35.76% were married couples living together, 19.86% had a female householder with no spouse present, and 40.28% were non-families. 33.30% of all households were made up of individuals, and 9.50% had someone living alone who was 65 years of age or older. The average household size was 2.62 and the average family size was 3.45.

The township's age distribution consisted of 32.7% under the age of 18, 7.4% from 18 to 24, 23.4% from 25 to 44, 24.9% from 45 to 64, and 11.5% who were 65 years of age or older. The median age was 32.0 years. For every 100 females, there were 90.8 males. For every 100 females age 18 and over, there were 92.5 males.

The median income for a household in the township was $47,598, and the median income for a family was $50,863. Males had a median income of $41,232 versus $33,228 for females. The per capita income for the township was $24,153. About 16.2% of families and 21.3% of the population were below the poverty line, including 35.3% of those under age 18 and 6.4% of those age 65 or over.

Historical population
Census	Pop.	Note	%±
2010	11,273		—
2020	10,705		−5.0%
U.S. Decennial Census
