= Attorney General Elliott =

Attorney General Elliott may refer to:

- Ivan A. Elliott (1889–1990), Attorney General of Illinois
- Robert B. Elliott (1842–1884), Attorney General of South Carolina
