= Rantoul National Aviation Center =

Rantoul National Aviation Center Airport Frank Elliott Field
- IATA: none; ICAO: KTIP; FAA LID: TIP

Summary
- Airport type: Public
- Owner: Village of Rantoul
- Serves: Rantoul, Illinois
- Built: 1993
- Time zone: UTC−06:00 (-6)
  - Summer (DST): UTC−05:00 (-5)
- Elevation AMSL: 737 ft / 225 m
- Coordinates: 40°17′37″N 88°08′33″W
- Website: Rantoul Airport

Map
- Location of airport in Illinois TIP (the United States)

Runways
Direction	Length		Surface
Direction	ft	m	Surface
9/27	5,001	1,524	Asphalt
18/36	4,894	1,492	Asphalt

Statistics
- Aircraft operations (2005): 20,000
- Based aircraft (2016): 11
- Source: Federal Aviation Administration

Rantoul National Aviation Center (ICAO: KTIP, FAA LID: TIP), also known as Frank Elliott Field, is a public use airport located in Rantoul, a village in Champaign County, Illinois, United States. It is owned by the Village of Rantoul.

Although most U.S. airports use the same three letter location identifier for the FAA and IATA, Rantoul National Aviation Center is assigned TIP by the FAA but has no designation from the IATA (which assigned TIP to Tripoli International Airport in Tripoli, Libya).

In 2021, the airport was selected for the Illinois Department of Transportation's Transportation Improvement Program. The airport received $100,000 to convert existing fuel facility dispensers to self-service dispensers.

== History ==
The airport was established in 1993 after the closure of Chanute Air Force Base (which was established as Chanute Field in 1917).

== Facilities and aircraft ==
Rantoul National Aviation Center covers an area of 1,192 acres (482 ha) and contains two asphalt paved runways: 9/27 measuring 5,001 by 75 ft (1,524 by 23 m) and 18/36 measuring 4,894 by 75 ft (1,492 by 23 m). For the 12-month period ending March 31, 2020, the airport had 20,000 aircraft operations, an average of 55 per day: all general aviation. For the same time period, there were 14 aircraft based at this airport: 10 single-engine and 2 multi-engine airplanes as well as 2 helicopters.

The Village of Rantoul operates a fixed-base operator on the airport offering fueling, aircraft parking, crew cars, and computer stations.

== Accidents and incidents ==
- On August 2, 2002, a Bell 412 helicopter's rotor struck a photographer on the ground while the helicopter was lifting off for a skydiving flight. The probable cause was identified as a congested takeoff and landing area and a low-altitude maneuver performed by the pilot.
- On July 24, 2011, a Piper PA 46-350P Malibu impacted terrain and power lines while taking off from Rantoul. The pilot and two passengers sustained fatal injuries. The preflight was reported as hurried due to the private pilot's concern over an approaching storm. After departure, strong winds were reported to push the plane's tail up and nose down, forcing the aircraft into the ground. The engine was reportedly producing thrust until the crash. The probable cause of the aircraft was the pilot's inability to maintain aircraft control during takeoff with approaching thunderstorms; contributing to the accident was the pilot's decision to depart into adverse weather conditions.

== Ground transportation ==
While no public transit service is provided directly to the airport, Champaign County Area Rural Transit System provides bus service nearby.

== See also ==
- List of airports in Illinois
- Rantoul station
