= Tim Johnson (Illinois politician) =

American politician and lawyer (1946–2022)

Timothy V. Johnson
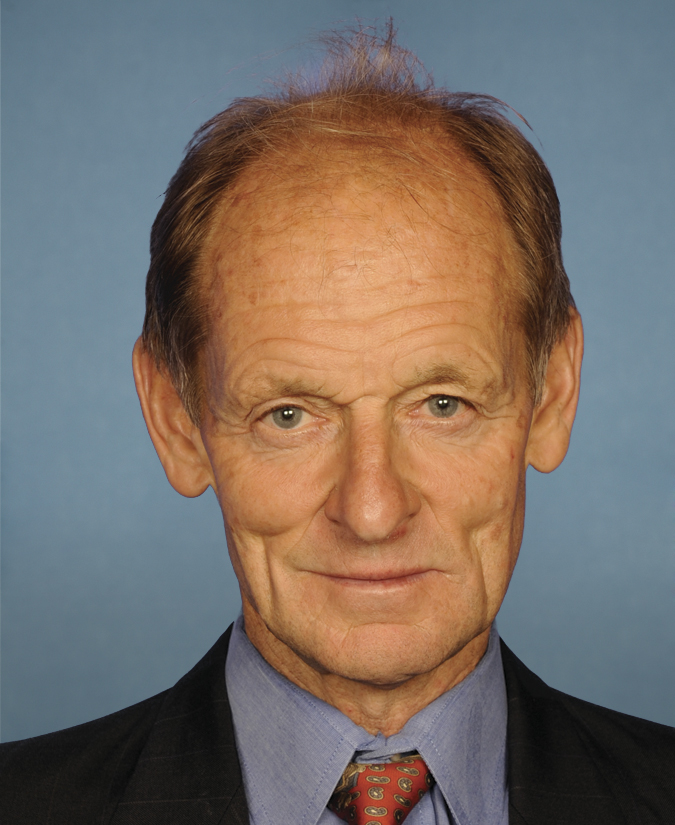

Member of the U.S. House of Representatives from Illinois's 15th district
- In office January 3, 2001 – January 3, 2013
- Preceded by: Tom Ewing
- Succeeded by: Rodney Davis (redistricting)

Member of the Illinois House of Representatives
- In office January 1977 – January 2001
- Preceded by: multi-member district
- Succeeded by: Thomas B. Berns
- Constituency: 52nd district (1977-1983); 104th district (1983-2001)

Member of the Urbana City Council
- In office 1971–1975

Personal details
- Born: Timothy Vincent Johnson; July 23, 1946 Champaign, Illinois, U.S.
- Died: May 9, 2022 (aged 75) Urbana, Illinois, U.S.
- Party: Republican
- Children: 9
- Education: University of Illinois, Urbana-Champaign (BA, JD)
- Occupation: Attorney

Timothy Vincent Johnson (July 23, 1946 – May 9, 2022) was an American politician and lawyer from Illinois. He was the U.S. representative for Illinois's 15th congressional district, serving from 2001 to 2013. He was a member of the Republican Party and did not run for re-election in 2012.

== Early life, education, and early political career ==
Johnson was born in Champaign to Robert and Margaret Evans Johnson, and spent his childhood in Urbana, where he graduated from Urbana High School.

He attended the United States Military Academy at West Point in 1964, followed by the University of Illinois at Urbana-Champaign. Johnson majored in history and graduated in 1969 Phi Beta Kappa, receiving the Bronze tablet, an honor given to the top 3% of undergraduates. In 1972, Johnson graduated with honors from the University of Illinois College of Law and was elected to the Order of the Coif, a national legal honor society.

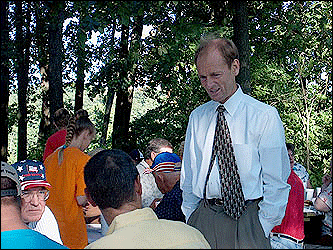
Johnson greets constituents at the annual Mill Creek Lake Steak Fry, held in Edgar County, Illinois.

In 1971, Johnson was elected to the city council of Urbana, Illinois.

== Illinois House of Representatives ==
In 1976, Johnson was elected to serve as a representative in Springfield, after besting five other Republican candidates in the 1976 Republican primary. Johnson remained a member of the Illinois House of Representatives from 1976 to 2000.

While running for re-election in 1980, a photograph was published showing Johnson had rigged a paper clip on the voting panel at his desk in the legislative chamber, pressing down the "yes" button so an affirmative vote could be recorded, even if he was not in the chamber. He initially denied installing it, but later said it was "accepted practice" in the legislature. Twenty years later, when Johnson ran for U.S. Congress, Mike Kelleher, his Democratic rival, had the story documented on a website dedicated to the photograph and Johnson's reactions, saying "It would be funny, if it weren't so serious..."

For most of his career, Johnson represented much of the more rural and conservative portion of Champaign County, along with portions of Ford and Douglas counties. After the 1990 census, Johnson was drawn into the same district as Democrat Helen F. Satterthwaite, who had long represented the other side of Urbana, as well as the University of Illinois at Urbana-Champaign. However, the new district was more Johnson's territory than Satterthwaite's; Republicans outnumbered Democrats by almost 3 to 1. It also did not include Satterthwaite's old base at the U of I. At that election, Johnson won with 60 percent of the vote.

== U.S. House of Representatives ==
=== Elections ===
2004

In 2004, Johnson raised $533,478 in campaign funds, less than half the national average for a Republican running for reelection ($1,206,138). The 2004 campaign fundraising was about a quarter of the $1,943,630 raised by his initial campaign in 2000; that in turn was nearly double the amount raised by his fellow freshmen Republicans ($1,171,118). Johnson defeated Democratic candidate David Gill 61% to 39%.

2006

In his 2000 campaign, Johnson pledged not to serve more than three terms. However, he ran for re-election in 2008 and 2010. Johnson "underestimated the value of seniority," spokesman Phil Bloomer says of his boss' decision to run for a fifth term. "As a rookie going in, (he) didn't understand what he could accomplish for his district by being there a longer period."

In the 2006 election in November, Johnson again faced Democrat David Gill.

At the end of June 2006, Johnson had over $130,000 available for spending for his 2006 campaign, more than double the total amount raised by his opponent at that point. In the 2006 midterm elections, he was reelected by a slightly narrower 58-42% margin.

2008

Johnson received 64.19% of his district's votes, defeating Democratic nominee Steve Cox.

2010

Johnson defeated Democratic nominee David Gill.

2012

Due to congressional apportionment following the 2010 Census, Johnson's district was renumbered as the 13th District for the 2012 elections. The redrawn district stretched from Champaign-Urbana through Springfield and Bloomington to the outer suburbs of St. Louis. Johnson now found himself in a district that was mostly new to him; he only retained about 30 percent of his former territory.

On March 14, 2012, Johnson endorsed Texas Congressman Ron Paul in the 2012 Republican Presidential primary in Illinois.

On April 5, 2012, just days after winning the Republican nomination for the reconfigured 13th, Johnson announced his retirement from office, to the surprise of many.

=== Tenure ===
Outside of meetings, committee hearings, and votes, Johnson was said to spend "nearly every waking minute" cold-calling his constituents; the practice amounted to calls to "more than a half-million constituents" during his first six terms in office.

In the House, Johnson's voting record was the most moderate among Illinois Republicans outside of the Chicago metropolitan area. In 2010, American Conservative Union gave him its second-lowest rating among Illinois Republicans, behind only Mark Steven Kirk of the 10th District. However, he was a member of the conservative Republican Study Committee.

For each of the 107th, 108th, 109th, and 110th Congresses Johnson received a score of 0% from the Human Rights Campaign. This was for, among other things, voting against the Employment Non-Discrimination Act, which would have prohibited discrimination in the workplace based on sexual orientation, and for refusing to adopt a written policy for his own office pledging not to discriminate on the basis of sexual orientation in employment decisions. Meanwhile, the Family Research Council, a conservative watchdog, in its most recent scorecard gives Johnson a 100%.

- Johnson voted against the Stem Cell Research Enhancement Act, which passed but was vetoed by President George W. Bush.
- In June 2006, Johnson voted against net neutrality, by voting for the COPE Act, and against the Markey amendment that would have inserted provisions to preserve network neutrality.
- Johnson was the sole Republican congressman to vote against the FISA Amendments Act of 2008 including immunity for American telecommunications companies that implemented warrantless wiretaps outside of the scope of the FISA program for the Bush administration. The bill passed, 293-129.
- On November 7, 2009, Johnson was the only Republican voting against the Republican Health Care Reform plan, the Boehner amendment to the Affordable Health Care for America Act.
- On February 8, 2011, Johnson was one of 26 Republicans who voted against extending the PATRIOT Act.

=== Committee assignments ===
- Committee on Agriculture
  - Subcommittee on Department Operations, Oversight, and Credit
  - Subcommittee on Rural Development, Research, Biotechnology, and Foreign Agriculture (Chairman)
- Committee on Transportation and Infrastructure
  - Subcommittee on Economic Development, Public Buildings and Emergency Management
  - Subcommittee on Highways and Transit
  - Subcommittee on Water Resources and Environment

=== Caucus memberships ===
- Congressional Central Aisle Caucus (Co-founder)
- Congressional Fire Services Caucus
- Congressional Internet Caucus
- Congressional Rural Caucus
- International Conservation Caucus
- Congressional Caucus on Foster Youth

== Post congressional career ==
In 2015, Johnson was elected to the Parkland College Board of Trustees.

In 2015, Johnson petitioned to become a delegate for Senator Marco Rubio's Presidential campaign.

== Personal life ==
Johnson had nine children. He died at his home in Urbana, Illinois, on May 9, 2022, aged 75.

== Awards and honors ==
Johnson was inducted as a Laureate of The Lincoln Academy of Illinois and awarded the Order of Lincoln (the State’s highest honor) by the then Governor of Illinois, Pat Quinn in 2013 in the area of Communications.

Illinois House of Representatives
Preceded by John C. Hirschfeld; Paul Stone	Member of the Illinois House of Representatives from the 52nd district 1977–1983; Served alongside: Helen F. Satterthwaite, Virgil C. Wikoff	Succeeded by Eugene C. Doyle
Preceded by Constituency established	Member of the Illinois House of Representatives from the 104th district 1983–2001	Succeeded by Thomas B. Berns
U.S. House of Representatives
Preceded by Tom Ewing	Member of the U.S. House of Representatives from Illinois's 15th congressional district 2001–2013	Succeeded by John Shimkus
