= Helen F. Satterthwaite =

American politician (born 1928)

Helen F. Satterthwaite (born July 8, 1928) is an American retired politician.

== Formative years ==
Born in western Pennsylvania, Satterthwaite went to public school in the rural Pittsburgh, Pennsylvania area. She received her bachelor's degree in chemistry from Duquesne University. In 1961, Satterthwaite, her husband Cameron, and family moved to Urbana, Illinois.

== Career ==
Satterthwaite worked at the College of Veterinary Medicine at the University of Illinois Urbana-Champaign as a laboratory technician. She then served in the Illinois House of Representatives from 1975 to 1993 and was a Democrat.

For most of her tenure, Satterthwaite represented a compact, urban district that included portions of Champaign and Urbana, including the campus of the University of Illinois Urbana-Champaign. However, in the 1990 redistricting, Satterthwaite's home in Urbana was drawn into the same district as Republican Tim Johnson. Satterthwaite now found herself in territory that was significantly more rural and Republican than its predecessor; Republicans had a 3-to-1 edge in registration. She also lost her longstanding base at U of I. During that election, Satterthwaite was defeated by a substantial margin, taking only 39 percent of the vote.
