= Thomas B. Berns =

American politician and civil engineer

Member of the Illinois House of Representatives
- In office 2000–2003

Personal details
- Born: August 8, 1945 Chicago, Illinois, U.S.
- Died: February 19, 2018 (aged 72) St. Louis, Missouri, U.S.
- Party: Republican
- Education: University of Illinois
- Profession: Politician, civil engineer

Thomas B. Berns (August 8, 1945 – February 19, 2018) was an American politician and civil engineer.

Berns was born in Chicago, Illinois. He graduated from University of Illinois with a degree in civil engineering. He lived in Urbana, Illinois with his wife and family. Berns was a civil engineer and surveyor. He taught surveying at the University of Illinois. Berns served in the Illinois House of Representatives from 2000 to 2003 and was a Republican. Berns died at Barnes-Jewish Hospital in St. Louis, Missouri, from complications following heart surgery.
