= William B. Webber =

American politician (1836–1916)

Member of the Illinois House of Representatives
- In office 1885–1886

Personal details
- Born: October 31, 1836 Urbana, Illinois, U.S.
- Died: September 8, 1916 (aged 79) Urbana, Illinois, U.S.
- Party: Democratic
- Occupation: Politician, lawyer

William B. Webber (October 31, 1836 – September 8, 1916) was an American lawyer and politician.

Webber was born in Urbana, Illinois to pioneer parents Thomson R. Webber and Nancy Baskett and went to the public schools. His grandfather, William T. Webber, with Isaac Busey and Matthew Busey, donated land for the formation of the township.

He studied law and was admitted to the Illinois bar in 1863. Webber practiced law in Urbana, Illinois. He served in the Illinois House of Representatives in 1885 and 1886 and was a Democrat. He served as mayor of Urbana, Illinois (1893-1895). Webber died at his home in Urbana, Illinois, from heart problems.
