= Rantoul, Illinois =

- Village
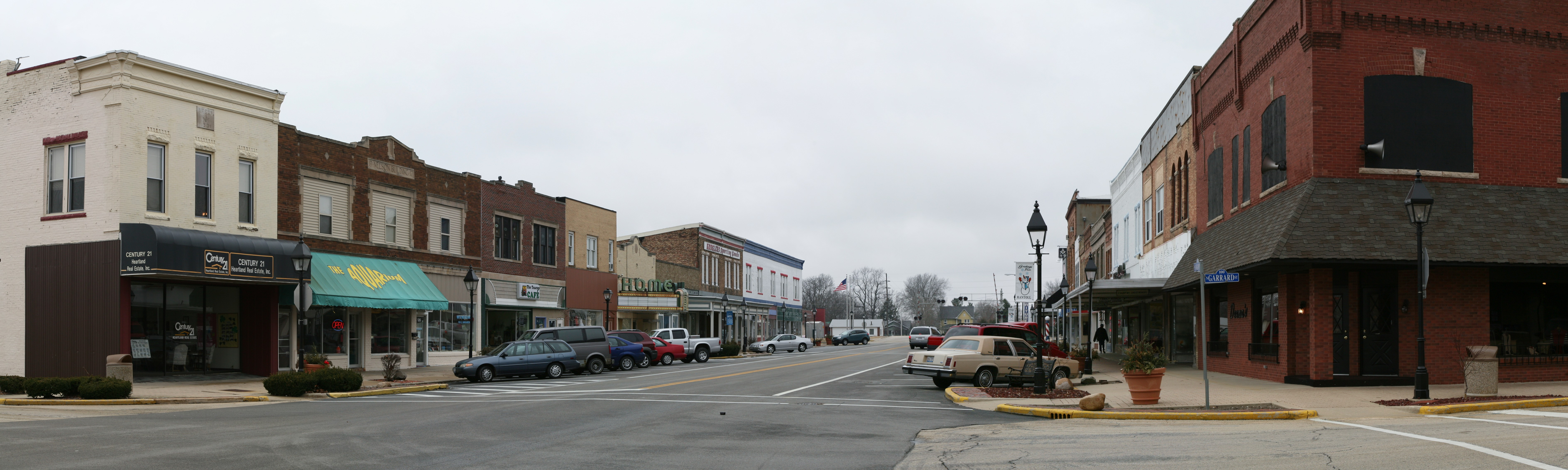
- Downtown Rantoul

- Location of Rantoul, Illinois

- Location within Champaign County Rantoul (Illinois)
- Coordinates: 40°18′11″N 88°09′18″W
- Country: United States
- State: Illinois
- County: Champaign
- Townships: Rantoul and Ludlow
- Founded: March 4, 1854
- Chartered: 1869

Government
  - Mayor: Charles Smith

Area
  - Total: 8.594 sq mi (22.258 km^{2})
  - Land: 8.490 sq mi (21.990 km^{2})
  - Water: 0.104 sq mi (0.270 km^{2}) 1.21%
- Elevation: 745 ft (227 m)

Population (2020)
  - Total: 12,371
  - Estimate (2023): 11,956
  - Density: 1,408.2/sq mi (543.71/km^{2})
- Time zone: UTC–6 (Central (CST))
  - Summer (DST): UTC–5 (CDT)
- ZIP Code: 61866
- Area codes: 217 and 447
- FIPS code: 17-62783
- GNIS feature ID: 2399042
- Sales tax: 9.0%
- Website: village.rantoul.il.us

Rantoul is a village in northern Champaign County, Illinois, United States. The population was 12,371 at the 2020 census. It is part of the Champaign–Urbana metropolitan area.

== History ==
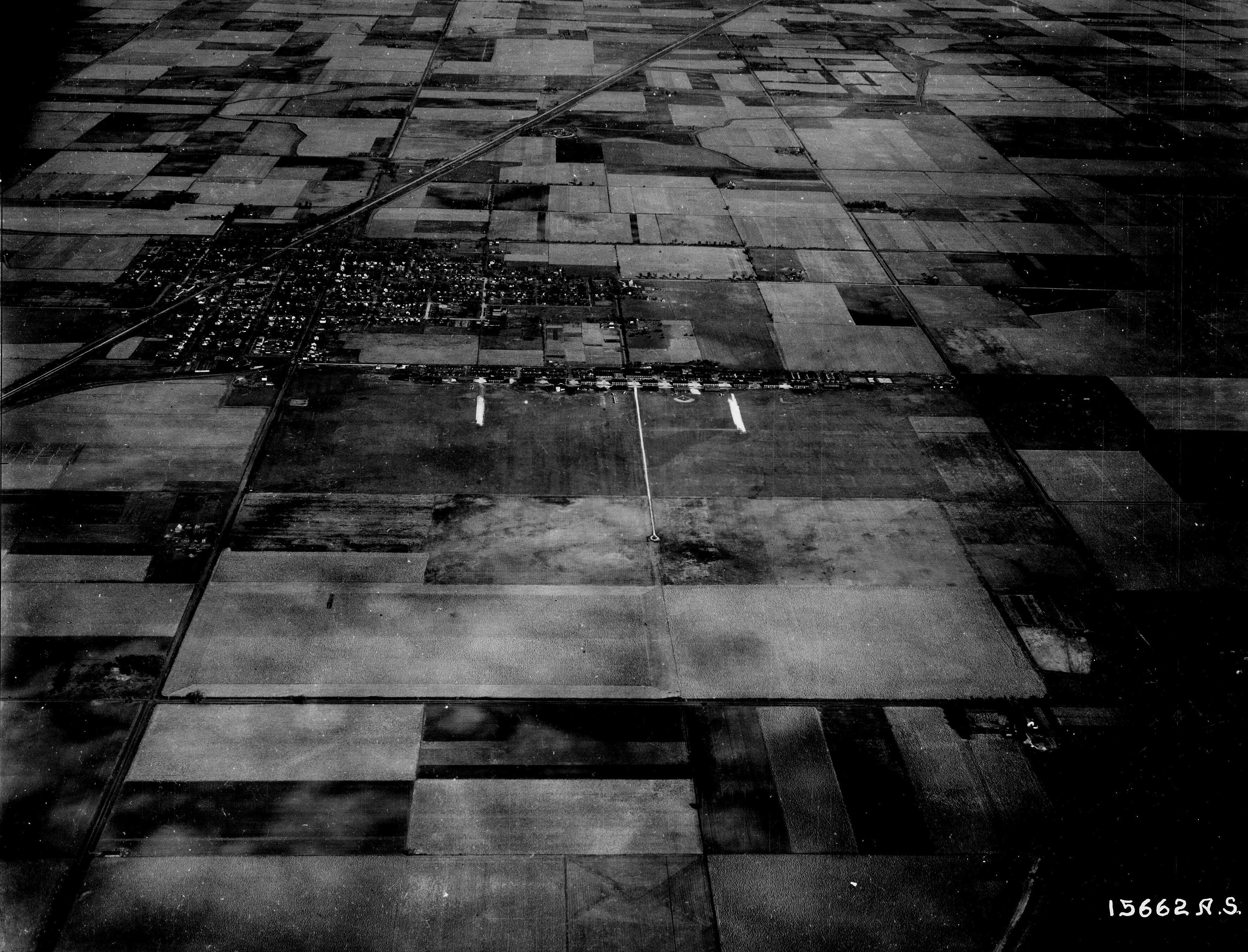
Rantoul in 1930

The first permanent settlement in the area known as Mink’s Grove (originally called “Neipswah” by Native Americans) was established by Archa Campbell, who later served as the first mayor of Urbana. Campbell settled in the area in 1848, where he constructed a log cabin.

Mink's Grove was laid out in 1854 for the Illinois Central Railroad by John Penfield. A post office was established in 1856 as Rantoul Station; the name was changed to Rantoul in May 1862.

The community was named after Robert Rantoul, Jr., a U.S. representative from Massachusetts, and a director of the Illinois Central Railroad.

During the late nineteenth century, Rantoul’s economy was closely tied to agriculture. Champaign County was characterized by highly fertile soil and extensive grain production, particularly corn. Towns such as Rantoul functioned as shipping and trade centers for local farmers, and the Illinois Central Railroad enabled crops to be transported efficiently to larger markets, including Chicago.

Rantoul experienced steady population growth during this period. By the time the village was incorporated in 1869, it had approximately 1,634 residents. This reflected its development as a small but stable agricultural community. This pattern of gradual growth continued until the establishment of Chanute Field in 1917.

In 1917, Rantoul was chosen by the United States Army to be the site of Chanute Field, due to its proximity to the Illinois Central railroad and the War Department's ground school at the University of Illinois. In the 1930s, Chanute Field grew, dominating the local economy as thousands of airmen were stationed there to train recruits. Renamed Chanute Air Force Base after World War II, it was closed in 1993, but was partly reoccupied by the Octave Chanute Aerospace Museum, which was permanently closed on December 30, 2015, and the Rantoul National Aviation Center. Rantoul's economy has taken a sharp decline due to the base's closing, from which it has never recovered. The book Eye of the Storm: Chanute Closes by Katy B. Podagrosi tells the story of this period.

Rantoul Family Sports Complex opened in August 2021 as a premier amateur sports facility featuring 10 all weather baseball / softball and 8 all weather multi-purpose fields. The complex plays host to thousands of amateur teams for tournament and local play. It also serves as home field for the University of Illinois "Fighting Illini" men's lacrosse team. In 2022, the Rantoul Family Sports Complex was visited by nearly 1 million people.

== Geography ==
According to the United States Census Bureau, the village has an area of 8.594 square miles (22.26 km^{2}), of which 8.490 square miles (21.99 km^{2}) (98.79%) is land and 0.104 square miles (0.27 km^{2}), (1.21%) is water.

=== Climate ===
Climate data for Rantoul, Illinois (1991–2020 normals, extremes 1965–present)
Month	Jan	Feb	Mar	Apr	May	Jun	Jul	Aug	Sep	Oct	Nov	Dec	Year
Record high °F (°C)	68 (20)	72 (22)	86 (30)	90 (32)	99 (37)	104 (40)	105 (41)	102 (39)	101 (38)	93 (34)	82 (28)	72 (22)	105 (41)
Mean daily maximum °F (°C)	34.4 (1.3)	39.6 (4.2)	51.4 (10.8)	64.3 (17.9)	75.4 (24.1)	84.9 (29.4)	87.5 (30.8)	85.9 (29.9)	80.7 (27.1)	67.3 (19.6)	52.3 (11.3)	39.8 (4.3)	63.6 (17.6)
Daily mean °F (°C)	25.1 (−3.8)	29.6 (−1.3)	40.4 (4.7)	51.9 (11.1)	63.3 (17.4)	73.3 (22.9)	75.8 (24.3)	73.7 (23.2)	67.5 (19.7)	54.7 (12.6)	41.8 (5.4)	30.9 (−0.6)	52.3 (11.3)
Mean daily minimum °F (°C)	15.8 (−9.0)	19.6 (−6.9)	29.3 (−1.5)	39.6 (4.2)	51.3 (10.7)	61.7 (16.5)	64.1 (17.8)	61.6 (16.4)	54.3 (12.4)	42.1 (5.6)	31.4 (−0.3)	22.1 (−5.5)	41.1 (5.1)
Record low °F (°C)	−27 (−33)	−19 (−28)	−13 (−25)	10 (−12)	26 (−3)	38 (3)	43 (6)	38 (3)	29 (−2)	21 (−6)	3 (−16)	−22 (−30)	−27 (−33)
Average precipitation inches (mm)	2.54 (65)	2.01 (51)	2.58 (66)	3.98 (101)	4.33 (110)	4.61 (117)	4.44 (113)	3.86 (98)	3.28 (83)	3.32 (84)	3.19 (81)	2.21 (56)	40.35 (1,025)
Average precipitation days (≥ 0.01 in)	8.2	7.1	8.8	10.2	11.0	9.8	8.7	8.0	6.5	8.1	8.5	7.4	102.3
Source: NOAA

== Demographics ==
Historical population
Census	Pop.	Note	%±
1880	850		—
1890	1,074		26.4%
1900	1,207		12.4%
1910	1,384		14.7%
1920	1,551		12.1%
1930	1,555		0.3%
1940	2,367		52.2%
1950	6,387		169.8%
1960	22,116		246.3%
1970	25,562		15.6%
1980	20,161		−21.1%
1990	17,212		−14.6%
2000	12,857		−25.3%
2010	12,941		0.7%
2020	12,371		−4.4%
2023 (est.)	11,956	▼	−3.4%
U.S. Decennial Census; 2020 Census

As of the 2023 American Community Survey, there are 5,086 estimated households in Rantoul with an average of 2.42 persons per household. The village has a median household income of $49,821. Approximately 18.7% of the village's population lives at or below the poverty line. Rantoul has an estimated 57.4% employment rate, with 11.9% of the population holding a bachelor's degree or higher and 90.6% holding a high school diploma.

The top five reported ancestries (people were allowed to report up to two ancestries, thus the figures will generally add to more than 100%) were English (83.3%), Spanish (15.0%), Indo-European (1.2%), Asian and Pacific Islander (0.1%), and Other (0.4%).

The median age in the village was 35.0 years.

=== Racial and ethnic composition ===
Rantoul village, Illinois – Racial and ethnic composition Note: the US Census treats Hispanic/Latino as an ethnic category. This table excludes Latinos from the racial categories and assigns them to a separate category. Hispanics/Latinos may be of any race.
Race / Ethnicity (NH = Non-Hispanic)	Pop 2000	Pop 2010	Pop 2020	% 2000	% 2010	% 2020
White alone (NH)	9,709	8,045	6,387	75.52%	62.17%	51.63%
Black or African American alone (NH)	2,133	2,877	2,720	16.59%	22.23%	21.99%
Native American or Alaska Native alone (NH)	47	35	25	0.37%	0.27%	0.20%
Asian alone (NH)	220	212	146	1.71%	1.64%	1.18%
Native Hawaiian or Pacific Islander alone (NH)	6	7	7	0.05%	0.05%	0.06%
Other race alone (NH)	19	13	47	0.15%	0.10%	0.38%
Mixed race or Multiracial (NH)	377	500	882	2.93%	3.86%	7.13%
Hispanic or Latino (any race)	346	1,252	2,157	2.69%	9.67%	17.44%
Total	12,857	12,941	12,371	100.00%	100.00%	100.00%

=== 2020 census ===
As of the 2020 census, there were 12,371 people, 5,045 households, and 3,035 families residing in the village. The population density was 1,457.1 inhabitants per square mile (562.6/km^{2}). There were 5,639 housing units at an average density of 664.2 per square mile (256.4/km^{2}), and 10.5% of housing units were vacant.

There were 5,045 households in Rantoul, of which 32.3% had children under the age of 18 living in them. Of all households, 33.9% were married-couple households, 20.6% were households with a male householder and no spouse or partner present, and 35.8% were households with a female householder and no spouse or partner present. About 32.2% of all households were made up of individuals, and 11.1% had someone living alone who was 65 years of age or older. The homeowner vacancy rate was 2.7% and the rental vacancy rate was 9.7%.

The median age was 36.1 years. 27.0% of residents were under the age of 18 and 14.8% of residents were 65 years of age or older. For every 100 females there were 89.8 males, and for every 100 females age 18 and over there were 85.3 males age 18 and over.

100.0% of residents lived in urban areas, while 0.0% lived in rural areas.

=== 2000 census ===
As of the 2000 census, there were 12,918 people, 5,330 households, and 3,368 families residing in the village. The population density was 1,776.5 inhabitants per square mile (685.9/km^{2}). There were 6,161 housing units at an average density of 851.3 per square mile (328.7/km^{2}). The racial makeup of the village was 76.69% White, 16.88% African American, 0.47% Native American, 1.75% Asian, 0.05% Pacific Islander, 0.89% from some other races and 3.27% from two or more races. Hispanic or Latino people of any race were 2.69% of the population.

There were 5,330 households out of which 33.7% had children under the age of 18 living with them, 43.9% were married couples living together, 15.0% had a female householder with no husband present, and 36.8% were non-families. 30.8% of all households were made up of individuals and 10.2% had someone living alone who was 65 years of age or older. The average household size was 2.41 and the average family size was 3.02.

In the village the population was spread out with 28.6% under the age of 18, 9.5% from 18 to 24, 32.2% from 25 to 44, 18.2% from 45 to 64, and 11.4% who were 65 years of age or older. The median age was 32 years. For every 100 females there were 91.0 males. For every 100 females age 18 and over, there were 86.7 males.

The median income for a household in the village was $36,904, and the median income for a family was $43,543. Males had a median income of $32,440 versus $22,382 for females. The per capita income for the village was $17,948. About 8.5% of families and 10.7% of the population were below the poverty line, including 14.7% of those under age 18 and 4.6% of those age 65 or over.

== Activities ==
- Octave Chanute Aerospace Museum, detailing the history of Flight, Military Aviation, and Chanute Air Force Base, located on the old Base. Closed in 2015.
- Korean War Veterans Museum, a museum currently under construction detailing the history of the Korean War, located on the old Base.

== Education ==
The majority is in the Rantoul City School District 137 while a small piece is in the Thomasboro Community Consolidated School District 130. All of it is in the Rantoul Township High School District 193.

Public schools include:

- Rantoul Township High School, the only high school in Rantoul, Illinois and stands as its own district. RTHS serves students from Rantoul, Gifford, Thomasboro, Ludlow and the surrounding rural area. More information is provided through the provided link. The University of Illinois football scrimmage game is usually held at the high school field in August.
- Rantoul City Schools District 137 is a Pre-K-8 District with Grade Level Centers, made up of 5 schools: Eastlawn (Pre-K-5), Pleasant Acres (Pre-K-5), Broadmeadow (Pre-K-5), Northview (Pre-K-5), and Eater (6–8).

Private schools

- St. Malachy Grade School, a Catholic Grade School in Rantoul.

Other education

- Lincoln's ChalleNGe Academy In 1993, the Center for Strategic and International Studies published a study entitled, Forging a Military Youth Corps. That same year, Congress, acting upon the studies recommendations, provided funding in the 1993 Defense Authorization Act for the National Guard Bureau to conduct a pilot youth intervention program. The purpose of this pilot program was to determine if life coping skills and employability of a high school dropout could be significantly improved through participation in a life skills program using a military model.
- University of Illinois Advanced Transportation and Research Engineering Laboratory (ATREL) is a 47-acre laboratory site where pavement, railroad, and transportation systems are researched, studied, and tested.

== Transportation ==
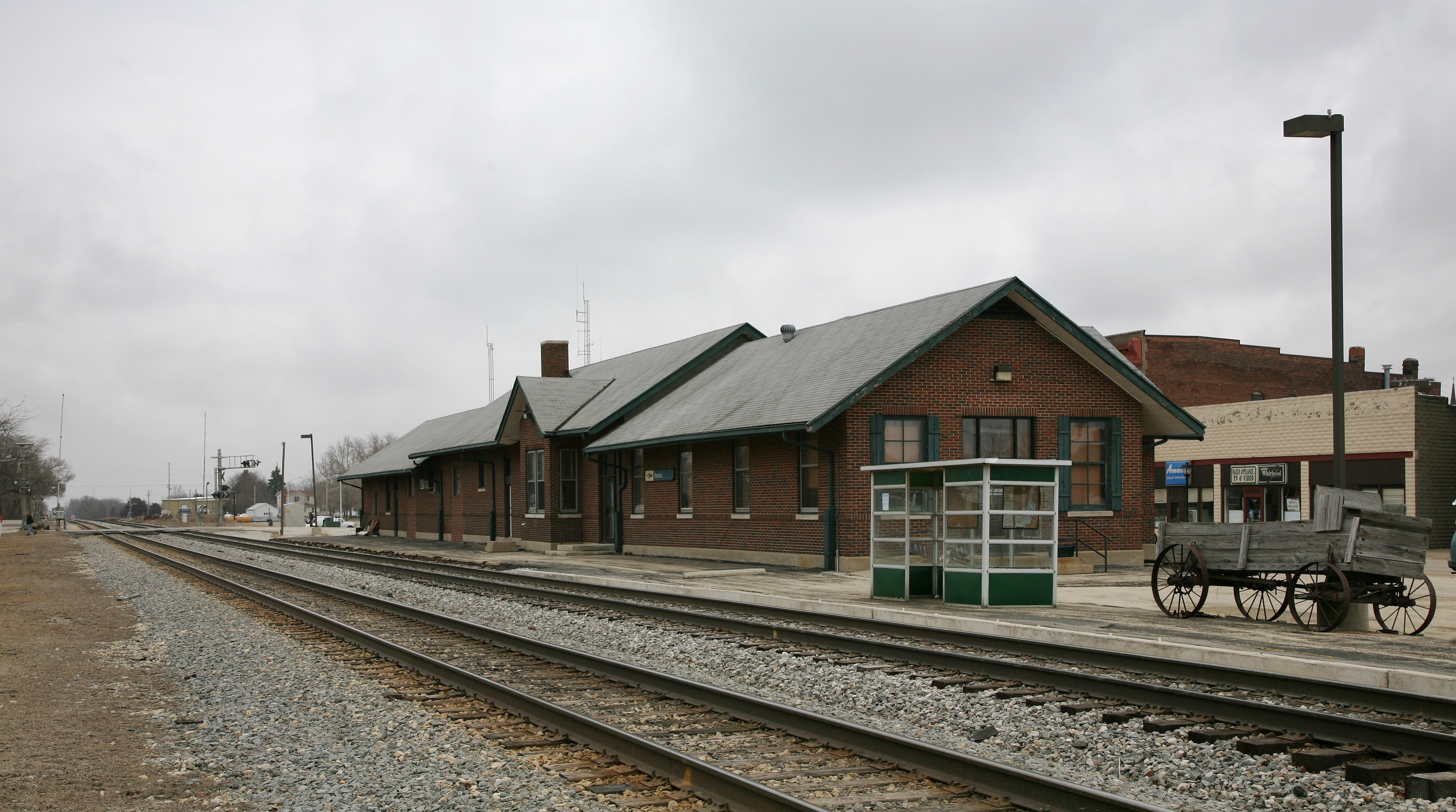
Rantoul station

=== Public transit ===
Bus service in Rantoul is provided by Champaign County Area Rural Transit System (C-CARTS). C-CARTS operates four routes within Rantoul and one route connecting Rantoul to Champaign-Urbana.

=== Rail transportation ===
Amtrak, the national passenger rail system, provides service to Rantoul. Amtrak Train 391, the southbound Saluki, is scheduled to depart Rantoul at 11:10am daily with service to Champaign-Urbana, Mattoon, Effingham, Centralia, Du Quoin, and Carbondale. Amtrak Train 393, the southbound Illini, is scheduled to depart Rantoul at 6:00pm daily serving the same points as the southbound Saluki. Amtrak Train 390, the northbound Saluki, is scheduled to depart Rantoul at 10:27am daily with service to Gilman, Kankakee, Homewood, and Chicago. Amtrak Train 887, the northbound Illini, is scheduled to depart Rantoul at 7:02pm daily serving the same points as the northbound Saluki.

=== Air transportation ===
- Rantoul National Aviation Center

== Notable people ==
- Don Branson, auto racer
- Sean Bubin, offensive lineman of the Detroit Lions and New England Patriots
- Michelle Franzen, television and radio reporter, graduated from Rantoul Township High School
- Harry M. McCaskrin, Illinois state legislator and lawyer
- Darren W. McDew, U.S. Air Force general
- Greg McMahon, special teams coordinator for the New Orleans Saints; Rantoul native
- C. Adrian Pillars, sculptor
- Jheri Redding, hairdresser, hair care products entrepreneur; best known for creating the Jheri curl.
- Kareem Richardson, former men's basketball coach at University of Missouri–Kansas City.
- Alan Ritchson, actor most known for Blue Mountain State
- Blake Schilb, professional basketball player, playing for Red Star Belgrade
- Craig Vetter, innovative designer of motorcycles, inducted into the AMA Motorcycle Hall of Fame in 1999
