= Stanley B. Weaver =

American funeral director and politician

Member of the Illinois Senate
- In office 1971–2003

Member of the Illinois House of Representatives
- In office 1969–1971

Personal details
- Born: May 23, 1925 Harrisburg, Illinois, U.S.
- Died: November 11, 2003 (aged 78) Urbana, Illinois, U.S.
- Party: Republican
- Education: Urbana High School; Michigan State College
- Occupation: Politician, funeral director

Military service
- Allegiance: United States
- Branch/service: United States Army (United States Army Air Corps)
- Battles/wars: World War II

Stanley B. Weaver (May 23, 1925 – November 11, 2003) was an American funeral director and Republican politician active in Illinois.

Weaver was born May 23, 1925, in Harrisburg, Illinois. He graduated from Urbana High School in Urbana, Illinois. He served in the United States Army Air Corps in the Pacific theater during World War II. He attended Michigan State College, University of Illinois, and graduated from the Indiana College of Mortuary Science. He was elected Mayor of Urbana in 1957 and served until 1969. During his tenure as mayor, he served as President of the Illinois Municipal League. He then served in the Illinois House of Representatives from 1969 to 1971. From 1971 until 2003, Weaver served in the Illinois State Senate. In 1977, Weaver joined Republican leadership in the Illinois Senate and would continue to serve in various leadership positions for the remainder of his time in office. In 1997, he was elevated to the newly created post of Senate Majority Leader.

Weaver died of cancer in Urbana, Illinois. The portion of U.S. Route 45 in Illinois that goes through Urbana-Champaign is named in his honor.
