= List of Illinois State University alumni =

This is a list of Illinois State University alumni who are notable enough to warrant an article in Wikipedia. The list is organized by general fields of achievement.

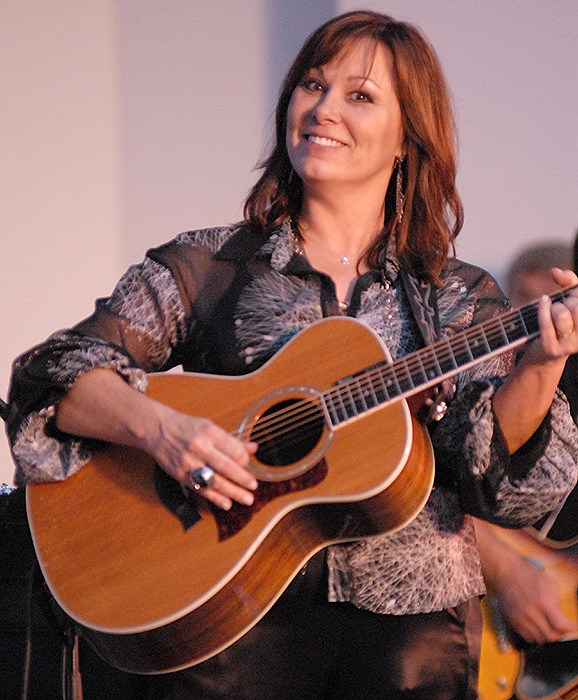
Suzy Bogguss

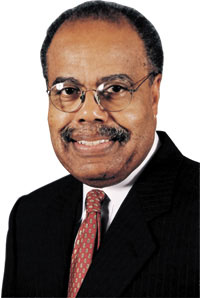
Donald McHenry

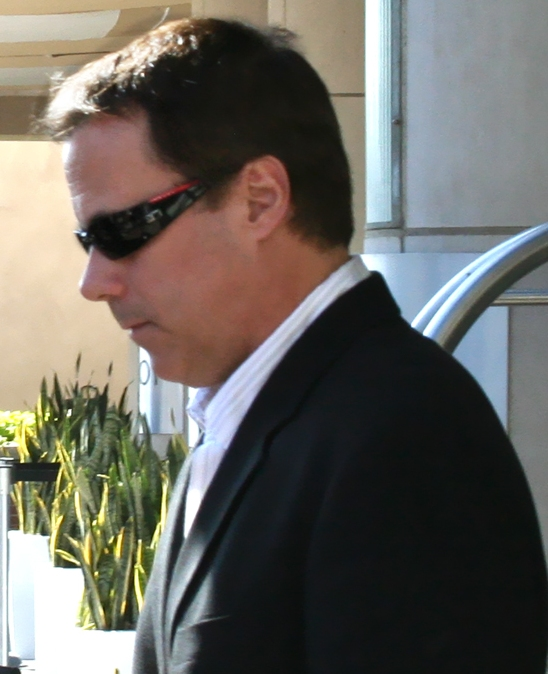
Richard Roeper

== Business ==
Name	Graduation year	Notes
Tricia Griffith	1986	CEO of Progressive Corporation; first woman named as Fortune magazine's Businessperson of the Year (2018)
Patti S. Hart	1978	Vice chairman of International Game Technology; named one of the "50 Most Powerful Women in Business" in 1998 by Fortune magazine

== Education ==
Name	Graduation year	Notes
J. Michael Adams	1969	President of Farleigh Dickinson University
K. Patricia Cross	1948	Retired professor at University of California-Berkeley; former senior lecturer and chair of the Department of Administration, Planning, and Social Policy at the Harvard Graduate School of Education
John Dossey		Mathematician, distinguished professor in the department of mathematics
Donald McHenry	1957	U.S. ambassador to the United Nations during the Carter Administration; Distinguished Professor of Diplomacy at Georgetown University
Patrick Schloss	1974	Author, researcher, and former president of Northern State University and Valdosta State University
Kenneth "Buzz" Shaw	1961	Chancellor of Syracuse University in Syracuse, New York 1991–2004
Reg Weaver	1962	President of National Education Association 2002–2008
Paul Wehman	1974 M.S.	Professor of counseling and special education and director of the Rehabilitation Research and Training Center, Virginia Commonwealth University

== Journalism and letters ==
- Todd Heisler – photojournalist and winner of Pulitzer Prize for Feature Photography
- Richard Roeper – author, columnist, film critic for Chicago Sun-Times, co-host of television's At the Movies with Ebert & Roeper
- Randy Salerno – Emmy Award-winning news anchor at WGN-TV and WBBM-TV in Chicago

== Law ==
- Michael P. McCuskey – federal judge
- Owen P. Thompson – Illinois district judge

== Literature ==
- Norbert Blei – author of the Chicago trilogy of Neighborhoods, The Ghost of Sandburg-Es Phizzog, and Chi Town
- Mort Castle – writer specializing in the horror genre; has written seven novels, two short story collections, and hundreds of shorter works
- Kate Charles – mystery novelist who bases all of her novels out of the Church of England; wrote Evil Angels Among Them, Unruly Passions, and Cruel Habitations
- Eric Rohmann – author and illustrator of children's books; received the 2003 Caldecott medal for My Friend Rabbit; received a 1995 Caldecott Honor book award for Time Flies; wrote The Cinder Cats and The Prairie Train
- Lester W. Smith – game designer specializing in role-playing games; creator of the Origins Award-winning game Dragon Dice

== Music ==
- Lil Bibby – rapper, producer, and record executive
- Suzy Bogguss – country music singer and guitarist
- Syleena Johnson – musician
- Gregory Kunde – operatic tenor
- Michelle Williams (attended) – musician, Destiny's Child

== Science ==
Name	Graduation year	Notes
Curt M. Horvath	1985	Virologist and immunologist
Malcolm L. McCallum	1995	Conservation scientist, herpetologist
Jenny P. Y. Ting	1975	President of Farleigh Dickinson University
Amy Wagner	1992	Neuroscientist

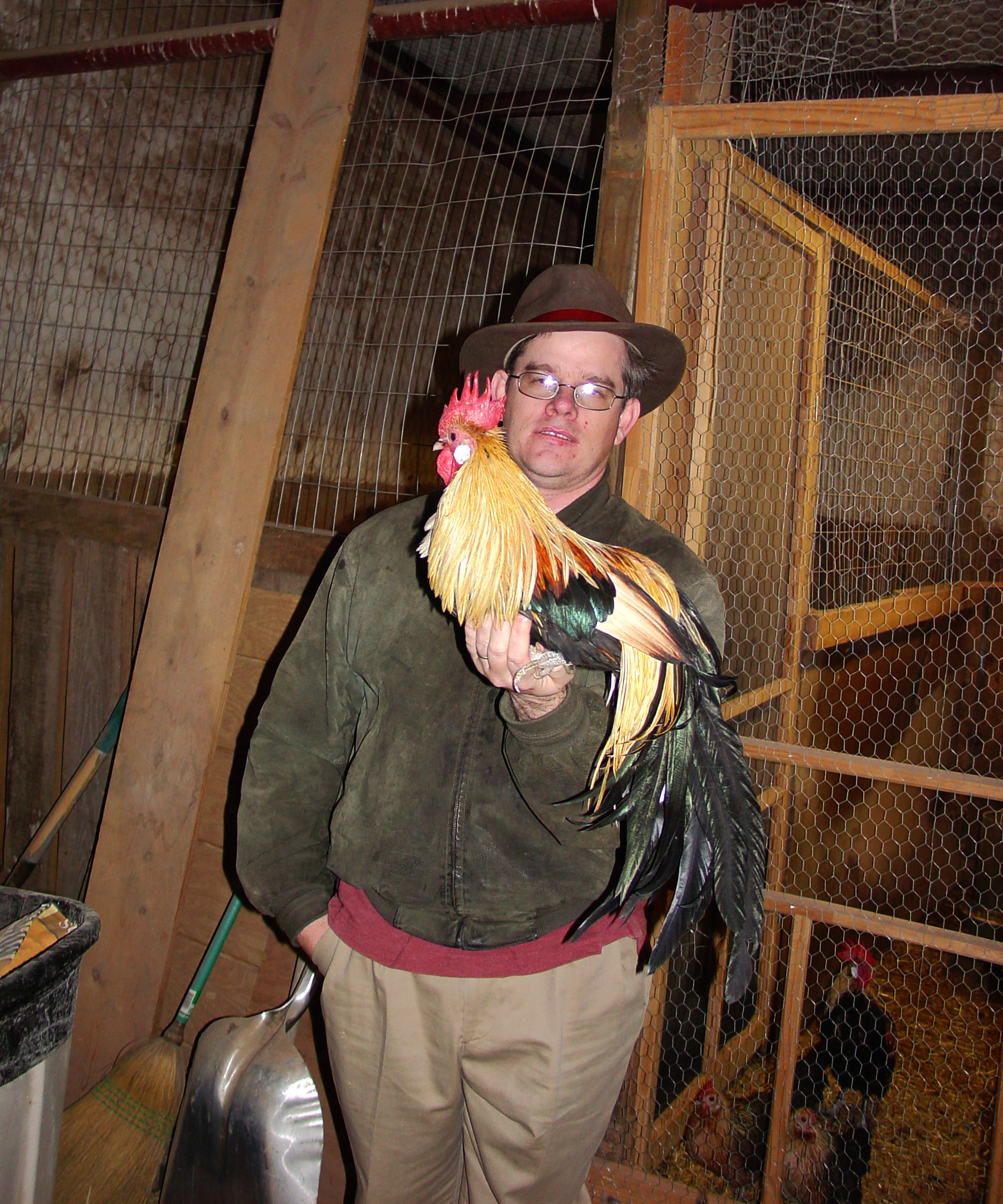
Malcolm L. McCallum

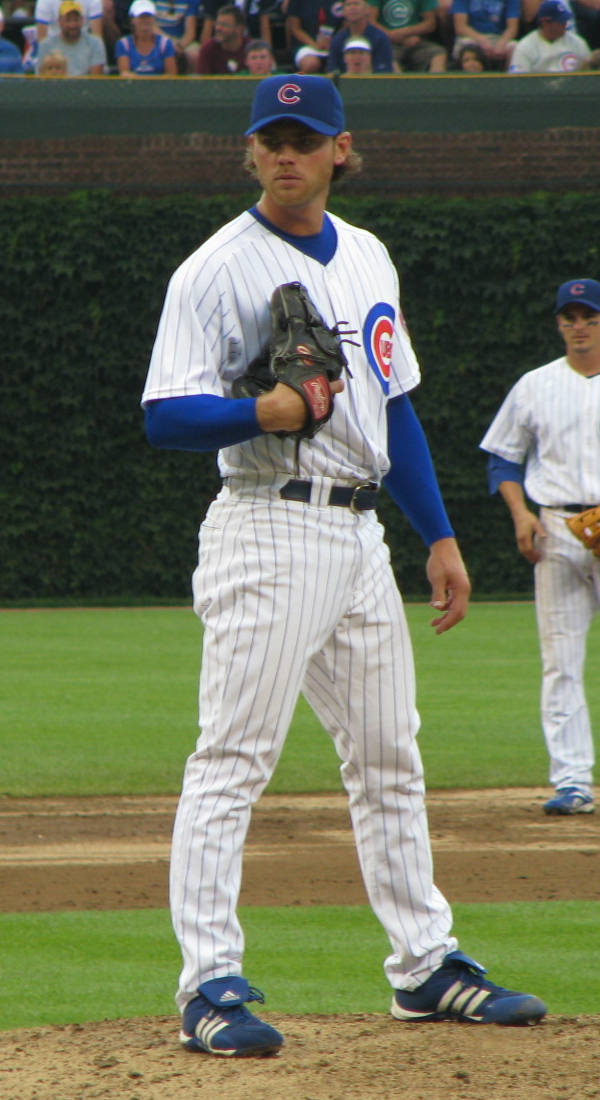
Neal Cotts

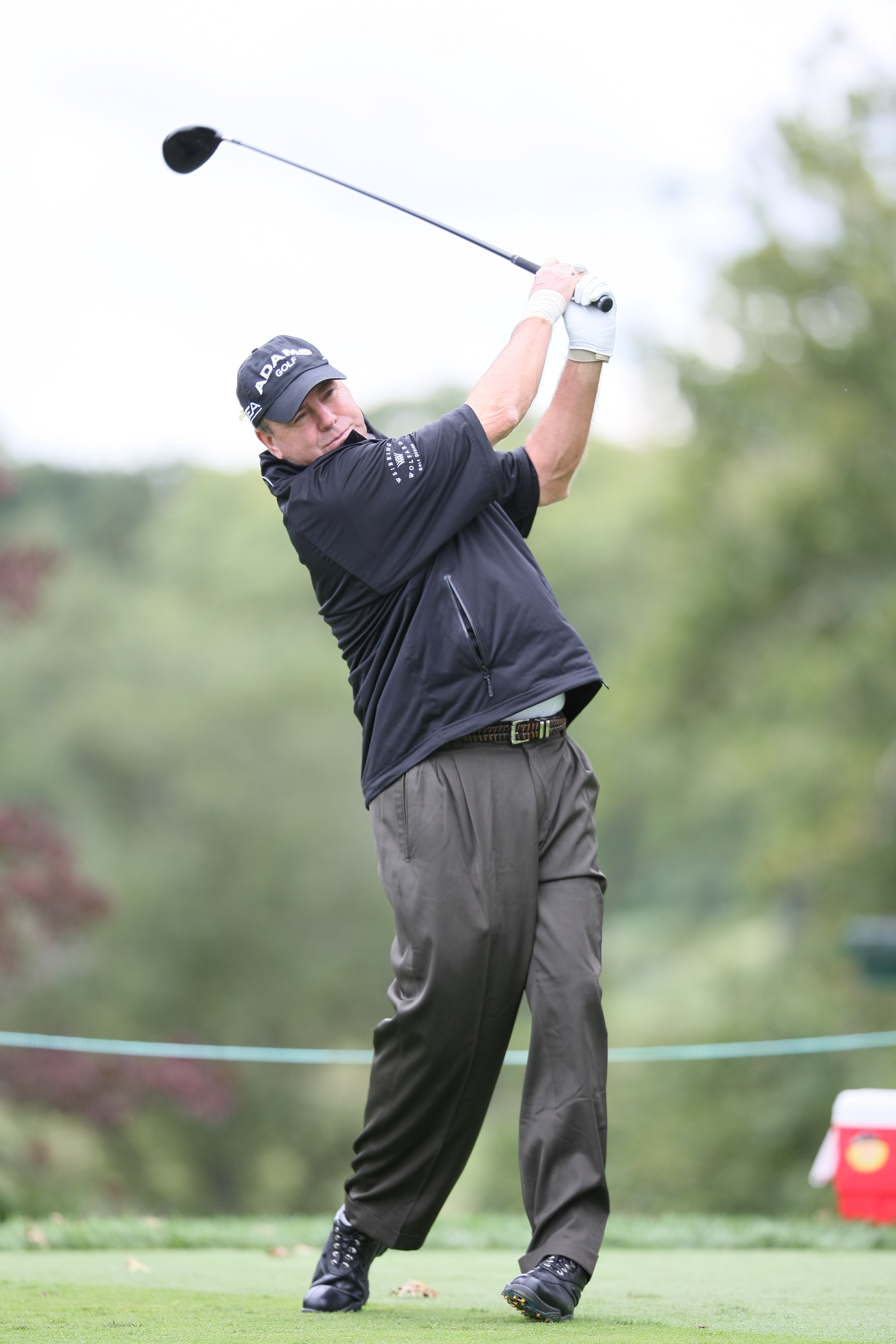
D. A. Weibring

== Government ==
=== Federal government ===
- Adam Kinzinger – served as a U.S. representative for Illinois's 16th congressional district
- Thomas R. Lamont – assistant secretary of the Army (Manpower and Reserve Affairs) (2009–2014)
- Donald McHenry – former U.S. ambassador to the United Nations (1979–81)

=== State government ===
- Pamela Althoff – Republican member of the Illinois Senate (2003–present) and mayor of McHenry, Illinois (2001–2003)
- Bob Bacon – Democratic member of the Colorado Senate (2005–2013) and Colorado House of Representatives (1997–2003)
- Jason Barickman – Republican member of the Illinois Senate (2013–present)
- Scott M. Bennett – Democratic member of the Illinois Senate (2015–present)
- Thomas M. Bennett – Republican member of the Illinois House of Representatives (2015–present)
- Jennifer Bertino-Tarrant – Democratic member of the Illinois Senate (2013–present) and Will County regional superintendent of schools (2007–2013)
- William B. Black – Republican member of Illinois House of Representatives
- Jim Durkin – Republican minority leader and member of Illinois House of Representatives (2006–present)
- Josh Harms – Republican member of the Illinois House of Representatives (2013–2015)
- Jay Hoffman – Democratic member of the Illinois House of Representatives (2013–present); previously served 1995–2001
- Lyman Beecher Kellogg – president of Emporia State University 1865–1871; 14th Kansas attorney general
- Frank Mautino – Illinois auditor general (2015–present) and Democratic member of the Illinois House of Representatives (1991–2015)
- Jerry L. Mitchell – Republican member of the Illinois House of Representatives (1995–2012)
- Rosemary Mulligan – Republican member of the Illinois House of Representatives (1993–2013)
- Laura Murphy – Democratic member of the Illinois Senate (2015–present)
- Michele Reagan – 27th secretary of state of Arizona
- Kitty Rhoades – Republican member of the Wisconsin State Assembly (1998–2010)
- Dan Rutherford – Illinois treasurer (2011–2015) and gubernatorial candidate in 2014 Republican primary
- Sue Scherer – Democratic member of the Illinois House of Representatives (2013–present)
- Elgie Sims – Democratic member of the Illinois House of Representatives (2012–present)
- Thomas P. Sinnett – state representative, Illinois House of Representatives (1924–1938), Democratic floor leader (1933–1934)
- Arthur Turner – House majority leader and Democratic member of the Illinois House of Representatives (1981–2010)
- Tammie Wilson – Republican member of the Alaska House of Representatives (2009–present)
- Christine Winger – Republican member of the Illinois House of Representatives (2015–present)

=== Local government ===
- Jim Ardis – mayor of Peoria, Illinois (2005–2021)
- Denny Doyle – mayor of Beaverton, Oregon (2009–present)
- J. Michael Houston – mayor of Springfield, Illinois 1979–1987 and 2011–2015
- George P. McLain (1847–1930) – Los Angeles City Council member at the end of the 19th century
- Mboka Mwilambwe – first African-American mayor of Bloomington, Illinois
- Harry Osterman – member of the Chicago City Council from the 48th ward (2011–present)

== Sports ==
- Jeremy Accardo – former relief pitcher (2005–12) for several Major League Baseball (MLB) teams
- Dave Bergman – former MLB first baseman (1975, 77–92); member of the 1984 World Series champion Detroit Tigers; his uniform No. 12 was retired by the ISU baseball team
- Cathy Boswell – member of the 1984 U.S. Olympic gold medal basketball team; played professional basketball in Italy
- Duane Butler – NFL linebacker
- Lee "Buzz" Capra – former All-Star MLB pitcher (1971–77); led the National League in ERA in 1974
- Jackie Carmichael (born 1990) – basketball player
- Aveion Cason – former NFL running back (2001–08)
- Doug Collins – television sports commentator and former head coach of the Chicago Bulls, Detroit Pistons, Philadelphia 76ers, and Washington Wizards
- Neal Cotts – former MLB relief pitcher; member of the 2005 World Series champion Chicago White Sox
- Paul DeJong (born 1993) – MLB infielder for the Chicago White Sox
- Luke Drone – former NFL player and current AF2 player
- Eric Eckenstahler – former MLB pitcher, played for the Detroit Tigers
- Steve Fisher – retired college basketball coach; was head coach at San Diego State University (1999–2017) and Michigan (1989–97); led the Michigan Wolverines to the 1989 NCAA Men's Division I Basketball Championship
- Kevin Glenn – former Canadian Football League (CFL) quarterback; finalist for the league's MVP award in 2007; played for several CFL teams, most recently the Saskatchewan Roughriders
- James "Boomer" Grigsby – former NFL fullback (2005–08), playing most of his career for the Kansas City Chiefs
- Shelby Harris (born 1991) – NFL defensive end
- Brent Hawkins – former NFL defensive end (2006–07), playing his entire NFL career for the Jacksonville Jaguars; most recently played for the Saskatchewan Roughriders of the CFL
- Robert Hawkins – NBA basketball player (1975–79)
- Brent Headrick (born 1997)– MLB pitcher for Minnesota Twins and NY Yankees
- Matt Herges – former MLB relief pitcher (1999–2009)
- Brandon Joyce – professional football offensive lineman for several teams
- Ed Kinsella – first athlete from ISU to play in MLB (1905, 1910)
- Dan Kolb – former MLB relief pitcher (1999–2007)
- John Kropke – defensive tackle in the CFL (1989–97)
- Paris Lee (born 1995) – basketball guard in the Israeli Basketball Premier League
- Charlotte Lewis – member of the 1976 U.S. Olympic gold medal women's basketball team
- Reggie Lynch (born 1994) – basketball player for Bnei Herzliya of the Israeli Basketball Premier League
- Cameron Meredith – former NFL wide receiver
- Jim Meyer – former NFL offensive tackle (1987)
- Dennis Nelson – starting offensive tackle for the Super Bowl championship team of the Baltimore Colts during the 1970s
- Tom Nelson – NFL safety for the Cincinnati Bengals, Philadelphia Eagles and Baltimore Ravens
- Nate Palmer – former NFL linebacker for the Tennessee Titans
- Mike Prior – former NFL defensive back (1985, 87–98); member of the Super Bowl XXXI champion Green Bay Packers
- Lorene Ramsey – retired women's basketball coach of Illinois Central College, who with a career record of 887–197, won more games than any other women's basketball coach at any college level
- John Rave – MLB outfielder for Kansas City Royals
- James Robinson (born 1998) – free agent NFL-RB and formerly with USL Louisville Kingsrunning back
- Laurent Robinson – NFL wide receiver (2007–12), most recently for the Jacksonville Jaguars
- Mark Rodenhauser – center for seven NFL teams
- Cameron Siskowic – linebacker for the CFL's Hamilton Tiger-Cats (2008–09)
- Brock Stewart (born 1991) – MLB pitcher for the Toronto Blue Jays
- Kye Stewart – linebacker with the CFL's Saskatchewan Roughriders (2010–11)
- Colton Underwood – football defensive end; contestant on the Bachelor franchise
- Zeke Upshaw – professional basketball player
- D. A. Weibring – PGA golfer; ISU's golf course is named in his honor
- Tom Wieghaus – former MLB catcher (1981, 83–84)
- Jeff Wilkins – professional basketball player (1977–93)
- Joe Woods – defensive coordinator of the NFL's Denver Broncos, champions of Super Bowl 50
- Margie Wright – named to the USA Olympic softball team as an assistant coach for the 1996 Atlanta Games; became in 2000 the softball coach with the most all-time NCAA wins
- Mike Zimmer – former head coach of the NFL's Minnesota Vikings; assistant coach with the Super Bowl XXX champion Dallas Cowboys

== Theatre and film ==
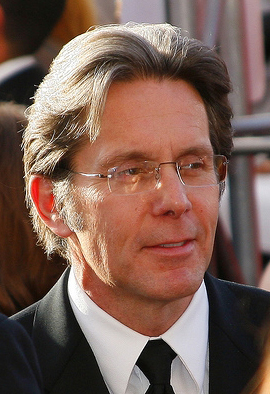
Gary Cole

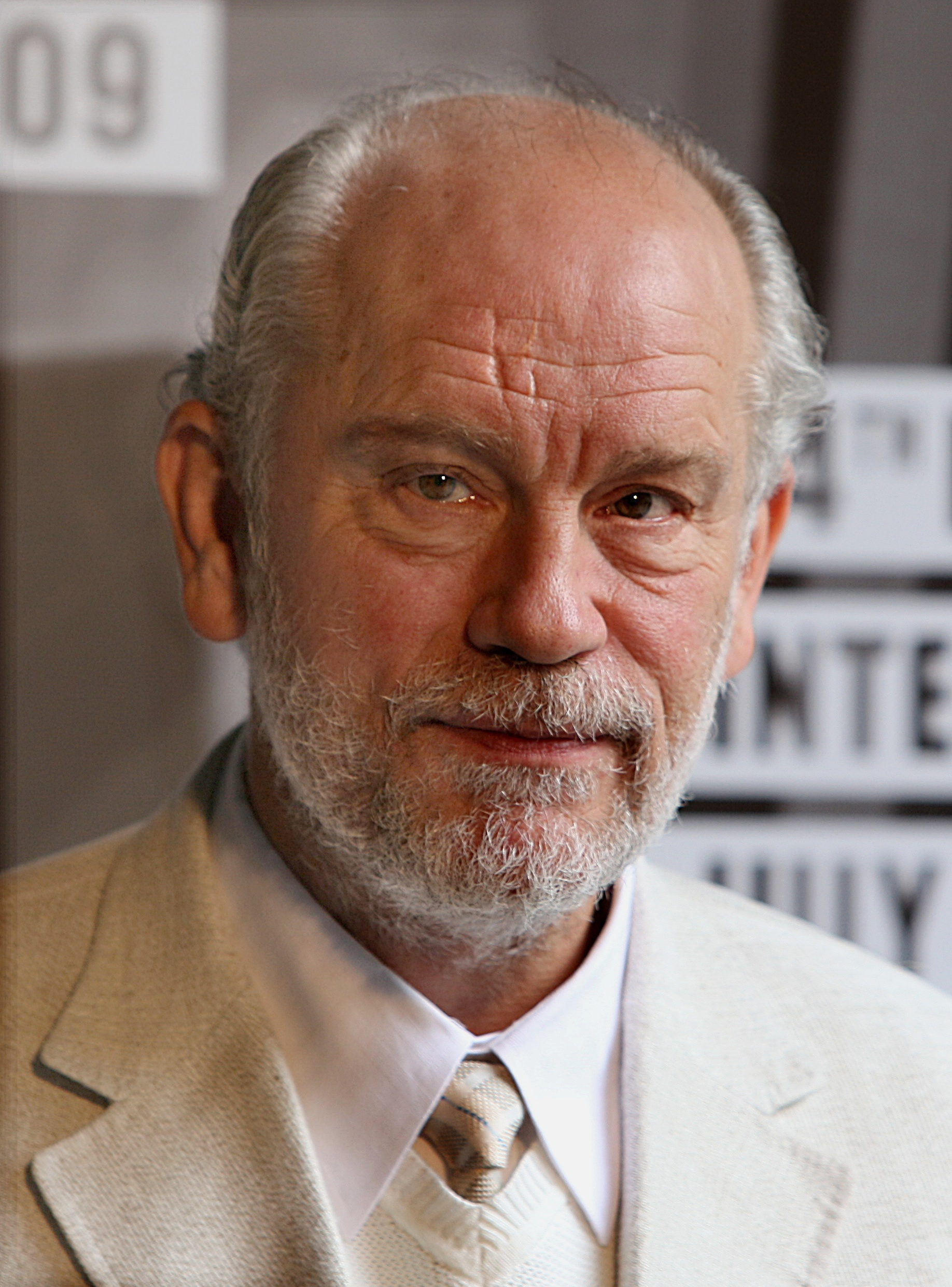
John Malkovich

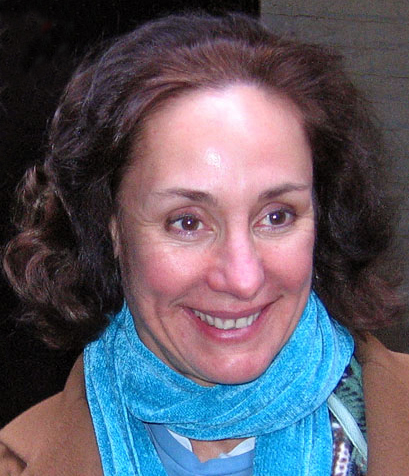
Laurie Metcalf

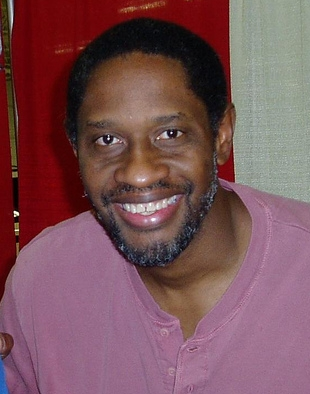
Tim Russ

- Carlos Bernard (1991) – actor (Tony Almeida on 24), The Young and the Restless
- Gary Cole (1978) – actor known for his work on screen (Office Space, Pineapple Express, The Brady Bunch) and television (Midnight Caller, The West Wing, Veep)
- Suzzanne Douglass – actress (The Parent 'Hood, Tap)
- Nelsan Ellis (attended, transferred in 1999) – actor, known for role as Lafayette Reynolds on television series True Blood
- Gary Griffin – producer with the Chicago Shakespeare Theater
- Moira Harris (1976) – actress (Terminator 3: Rise of the Machines)
- LaRoyce Hawkins (2012) – actor, known for his role on television series Chicago P.D.
- Reggie Hayes (1991) – actor, known for his role on television series Girlfriends
- Sean Hayes – actor, known for his Emmy Award-winning role as Jack McFarland on the television series Will & Grace
- Brendan Hunt – actor/writer (Ted Lasso, Key & Peele)
- Tom Irwin (1979) – actor, known for his work on television (Saving Grace My So-Called Life)
- Judith Ivey (1973) – two–time Tony Award-winning actress (Steaming, Hurlyburly)
- Terry Kinney (1976) – theatrical director and actor (Tim McManus on television series Oz)
- Natasha Leggero – actress and stand-up comedian; appears regularly on the Chelsea Lately roundtable
- John LeMay – actor, starred in syndicated television show Friday the 13th: The Series
- Jane Lynch (1982) – actress, known for her work on film (Best in Show, A Mighty Wind) and television (Glee)
- John Malkovich (attended, and awarded a degree in 2005) – film and theater actor (In the Line of Fire, Rounders, Being John Malkovich); two-time Academy Award nominee
- David McFadzean – writer and producer; created the TV series Home Improvement; executive producer of the films Where the Heart Is and What Women Want
- Laurie Metcalf (1976) – one of the six actors to win Tony Awards in consecutive years (2017–2018); won three Emmy Awards for the role of Jackie on the television series Roseanne
- William O'Leary (1980) – actor (Home Improvement, Hot Shots!)
- Jeff Perry (1978) – actor known for his work on television (Scandal, Nash Bridges, Grey's Anatomy)
- Rondi Reed (1977) – Tony Award-winning actress (August: Osage County)
- Craig Robinson (1994) – actor, The Office, Pineapple Express, Zack and Miri Make a Porno, Knocked Up
- Tim Russ – actor, known for his role as Tuvok on television series Star Trek: Voyager
- Gary Sinise – Emmy and Golden Globe Award-winning, Oscar-nominated film and television actor (CSI: NY, Forrest Gump, Apollo 13)
- Cecilia Suárez – actress who works in both American and Mexican cinema (The Three Burials of Melquiades Estrada, The Air I Breathe)
- Yvonne Suhor – actress (The Young Riders, Northern Exposure)
- Bruce A. Young – actor known for his work in television (The Sentinel) and film (Risky Business, Jurassic Park III)

== Other ==
- Emma Plummer Chadwick – clubwoman and civic leader
- Auntie Heroine – drag queen
- Emily Caroline Chandler Hodgin – temperance reformer
