= Lawrence Rocks (chemist) =

American chemist (born 1933)

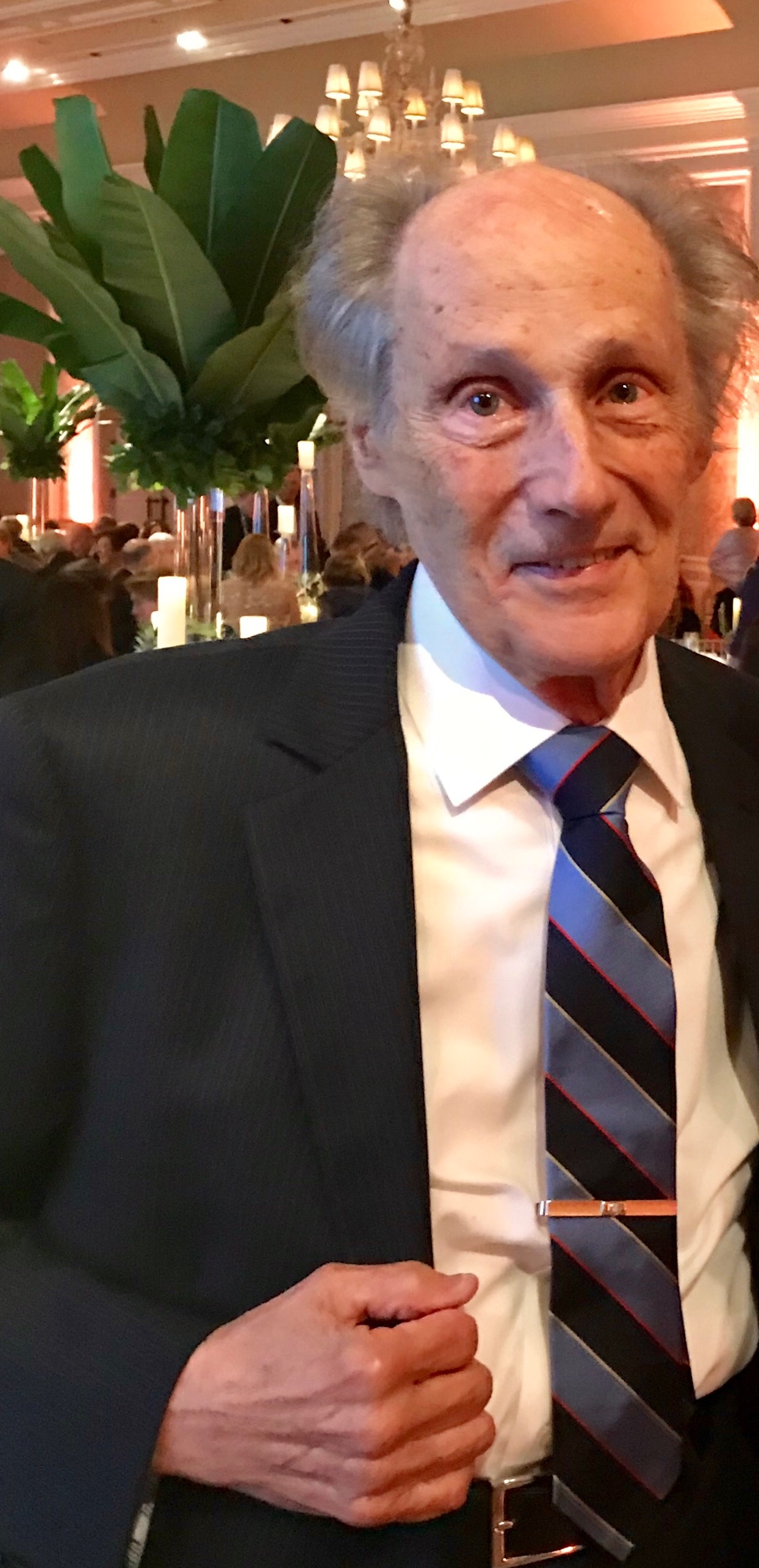
- Born: August 27, 1933 (age 93); New York City, U.S.
- Education: Purdue University (M.S.); Technische Hochschule Vienna (D.Sc)
- Occupations: Chemist / Prof. Emeritus, Long Island University
- Known for: Chemistry, Analytical chemistry, Energy, Environmental science
- Notable work: The Energy Crisis (Crown Publishers, 1972), Fuels For Tomorrow (PennWell Publishers, 1980)
- Spouse: Marlene Rocks (married 1968)
- Children: Burton Rocks
- Website: www.rocksreports.com

Lawrence Rocks (born August 27, 1933) is an American chemist and author who has written books on energy crises and biofuel. He has also written about chemistry and sports, specifically baseball.

His 1973 book The Energy Crisis coincided with the 1973 oil crisis. The book prompted public appearances and influenced the creation of the U.S. Department of Energy.

Rocks' has also worked with professional baseball player Paul DeJong on the role of chemistry in baseball.

== Career ==
Rocks received his Masters of Science degree from Purdue University and his Doctor of Science from Technische Hochschule Vienna. He wrote his doctoral thesis in German in the field of analytical chemistry separating metal atoms in semi-aqueous solutions, which found that equilibrium constants are changed in semi-aqueous mediums.

Rocks is Professor Emeritus of Chemistry at Long Island University.

=== Energy ===
Rocks wrote The Energy Crisis (Crown, 1972). The book called for the formal establishment of a national energy center, which influenced the creation of the U.S. Department of Energy by the Carter administration.

Following publication, Rocks was discussed by Time Magazine and National Review. He addressed the United Nations, and appeared on The Today Show, To Tell The Truth, and The Mike Douglas Show. Rocks had a column in King Features Syndicate.

After publication of The Energy Crisis, Rocks authored the chemistry textbook Developing Your Chemistry Fundamentals (The Petroleum Publishing Company) in 1979.

In 1980 Rocks authored Fuels For Tomorrow (PennWell Publishers 1980), a sequel to The Energy Crisis, in which Rocks stated that the future of agriculture will be in fermentation chemistry, a process he asserted was far less hazardous to the environment.

=== Sports ===
In 2017 Rocks conducted an experiment studying the effect temperature has on a baseball, with Paul DeJong as his laboratory assistant. The outcome of the experiment was that the optimal bounce of a baseball lies between 68-75 degrees Fahrenheit because at lower temperatures the elastomeres become more rigid and become softer at higher temperatures.

While appearing on MLB Network during the 2017 winter meetings, Rocks defined sports chemistry as "the combination of modern analytical chemistry with sports metrics." In 2018 Chemical & Engineering News interviewed Rocks, sharing his philosophy on learning science that, "Everybody can do it." St. Louis Cardinals Cardinals Insider interviewed Rocks in 2018 as to whether music plays any role in science. "There is a molecular rhythm to life in terms of development. There are body rhythms that will one day be understood for the mind," Rocks explained. In 2018 Topps referenced Rocks on the back of Paul DeJong's 2018 "future stars" series baseball card. DeJong credited Rocks with affecting his thinking of "off-season training routines". During the 2018 off-season Rocks and DeJong lectured at the Society of the Four Arts on the subject of tendons and respiration for athletic development.“Weightlifting is great – makes you feel like Superman," Rocks said. "But you lose the edge on flexibility.”

Topps issued a collectible card for Rocks for its 2019 card set.

== Personal life ==
He and his wife Marlene have one son, Burton Rocks, who is a writer and sports agent. He is a supporter of the Palm Beach Symphony.

== Bibliography ==
- Rocks, Lawrence; Runyon, Richard P (1972). The Energy Crisis. Crown Publishers. ISBN 978-0-517-501641.
- Rocks, Lawrence (1979). Developing Your Chemistry Fundamentals (1st ed.). The Petroleum Publishing Company. ISBN 978-0-87814-041-1.
- Rocks, Lawrence (1980). Fuels For Tomorrow (1st ed.). PennWell Books. ISBN 978-0-87814-135-7.
