= Burton Rocks =

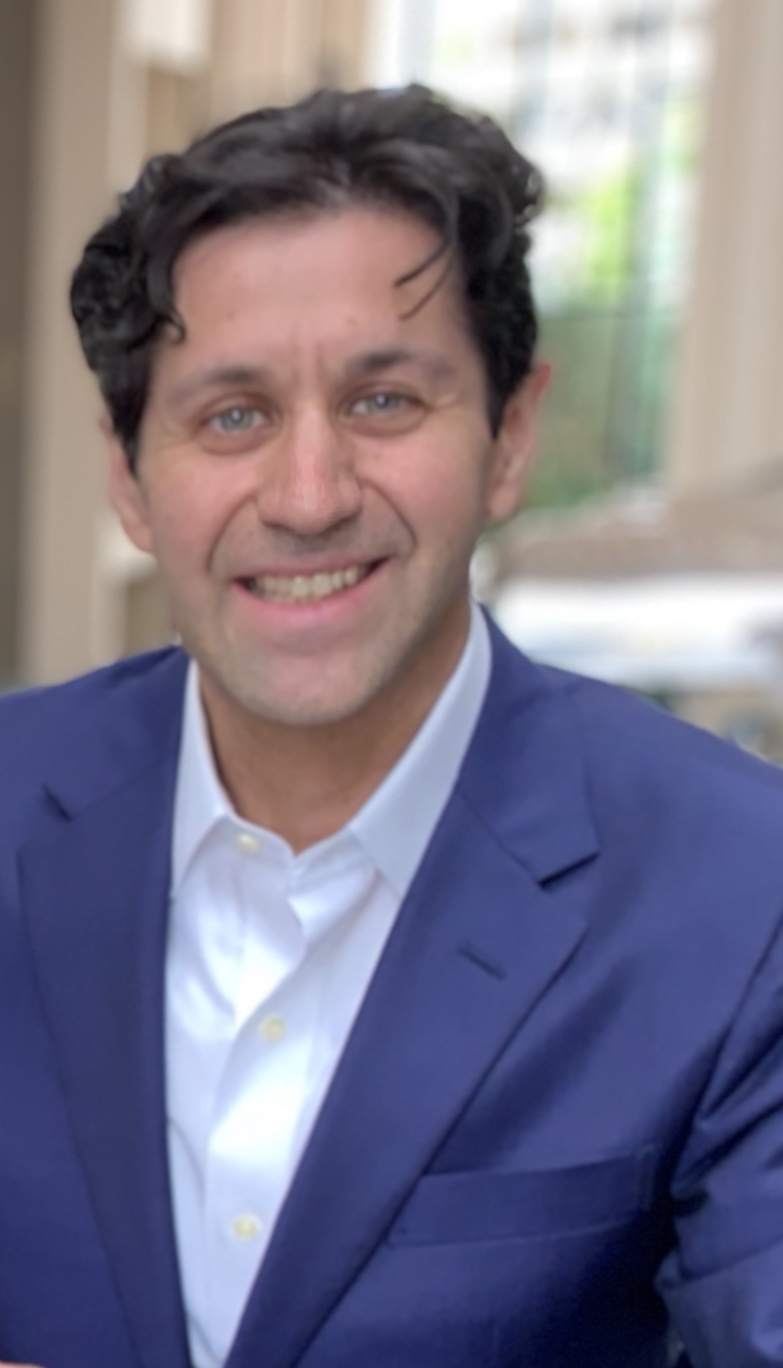
- Born: 1972 (age 53–54); New York, New York, US
- Alma mater: Stony Brook University, B.A. history 1994; Hofstra University, School of Law, J.D. 1997
- Occupations: President, C.L. Rocks Corporation
- Known for: Writer, business entrepreneur, sports attorney/agent
- Notable work: With Paul O'Neill: Me and My Dad: A Baseball Memoir (Harper Collins 2004)
- Parent(s): Lawrence Rocks, Marlene Rocks
- Website: www.clrockscorp.com

Burton Evan Rocks (born 1972, New York City) is an American sports attorney, agent, and writer. Rocks collaborated with Yankee outfielder Paul O'Neill on the 2003 New York Times bestseller Me and My Dad: A Baseball Memoir.

== Early life and education ==
Burton Rocks is the son of chemist Lawrence Rocks.

As a child Rocks was often hospitalized due to life-threatening asthma, suffering three code blues before the age of five.

He graduated from Ward Melville High School, and then graduated from Stony Brook University with a history degree in 1994, where he was a member of Phi Beta Kappa. Rocks then graduated Hofstra University School of Law.

== Writing ==
Rocks is the co-author, with New York Yankees outfielder Paul O'Neill, of the 2003 New York Times bestselling book Me and My Dad: A Baseball Memoir, detailing O'Neill's relationship with his father and how they bonded over baseball. Andrea Cooper, reviewing for the New York Times, described the book as a charming eulogy for O'Neill's father. Rocks has also co-written books with other athletes and media figures, including Carl Erskine., and Jack Klugman.

In 2006, Burton Rocks and Andrew Goodwin co-founded and launched the social media company Chatwithastar Inc.

In 2015, Stony Brook University hired Rocks as an adjunct business professor.

== C.L. Rocks Corporation ==
Rocks is the founder and owner of C.L. Rocks Corporation, a sports agency, which he launched in 2008, based on a metric he created during law school.. The agency has numerous high-profile clients, including Kip Wells, and Charlie Montoyo.

In 2018, Rocks negotiated a six-year contract extension worth a guaranteed $26 million for client Paul DeJong, the biggest contract ever signed by a Major League Baseball player with less than one full year of major league service time. Forbes SportsMoney profiled Rocks' "Quantified Intangible Sheet" evaluation methodology used in DeJong's contract extension negotiations.. In 2021 Rocks was a panelist in Society for American Baseball Research Analytics Conference on intangibles in contract negotiation..

In January 2019, Topps announced plans to issue a collectible card for Rocks.

== Bibliography ==
=== Co-authored ===
- King, Clyde – A King's Legacy: The Clyde King Story (1999, Masters Press) ISBN 9780809226610
- O'Neill, Paul – Me and My Dad: A Baseball Memoir (2003, Harpercollins Publishers) ISBN 0-06-052405-7
- Klugman, Jack – Tony and Me: A Story Of Friendship (2005, Goodhill Press) ISBN 978-0976830306
- Erskine, Carl – What I Learned From Jackie Robinson (2005, McGraw-Hill) ISBN 0-07-145085-8
- Feller, Bob – Bob Feller's Little Black Book of Baseball Wisdom (2001, McGraw-Hill) ISBN 0-8092-9843-0
- Lyons, Steve "Psycho" – The Psycho 100: Baseball's Most Outrageous Moments (2009, Triumph Books) ISBN 978-1-60078-167-4
- Feller, Bob – Bob Feller's Little Blue Book of Baseball Wisdom (2009 Triumph Books) ISBN 978-1-60078-219-0
- North, Andy – The Long and the Short of It (2002, Thomas Dunne Books) ISBN 0-3122-8797-6
