= Paul DeJong =

American baseball player (born 1993)

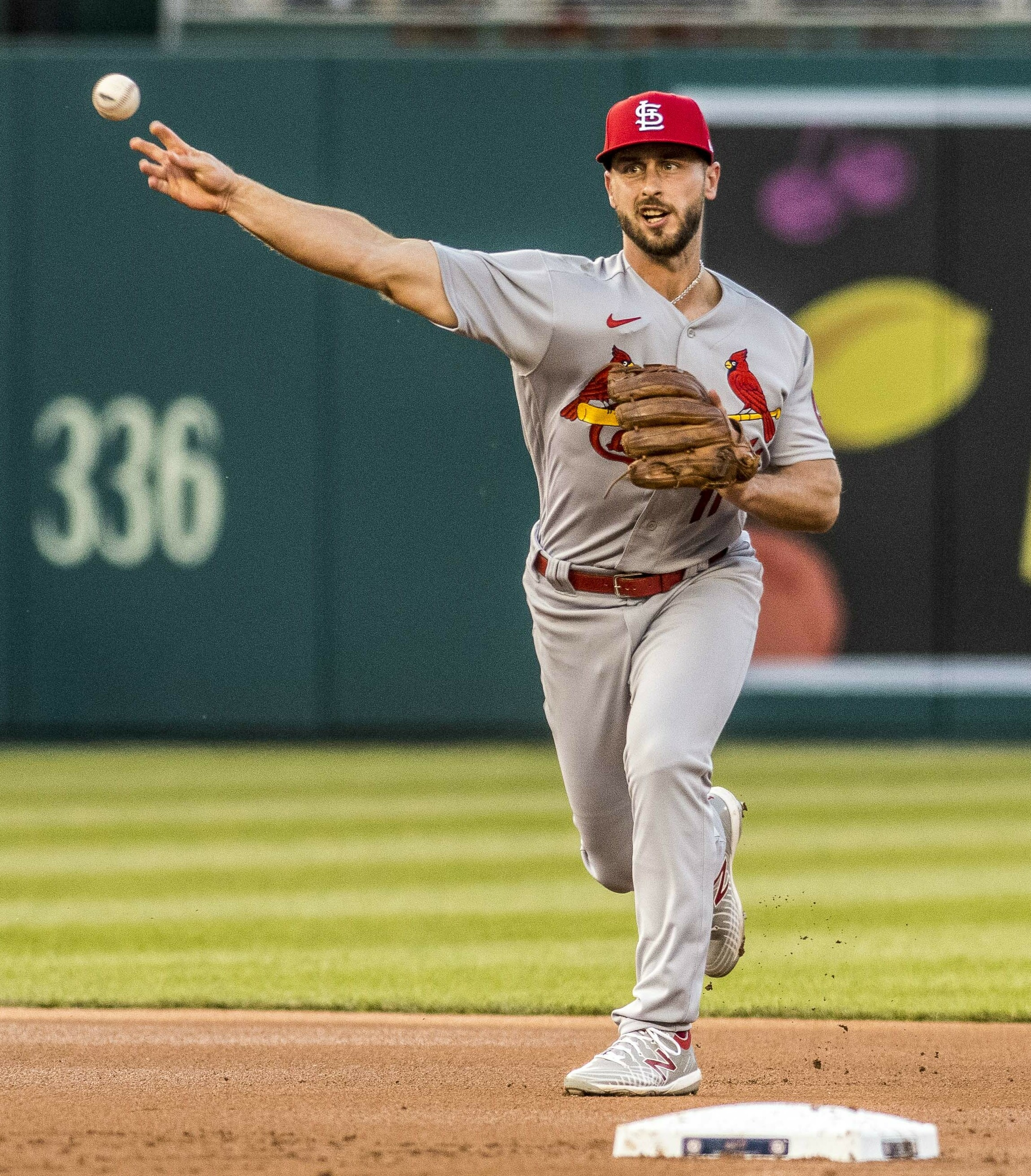
- DeJong with the St. Louis Cardinals in 2021

Free agent
- Shortstop / Third baseman
- Born: August 2, 1993 (age 33); Orlando, Florida, U.S.
- Bats: Right Throws: Right

MLB debut
- May 28, 2017, for the St. Louis Cardinals

MLB statistics (through 2025 season)
- Batting average: .229
- Home runs: 146
- Runs batted in: 423
- Stats at Baseball Reference

Teams
- St. Louis Cardinals (2017–2023); Toronto Blue Jays (2023); San Francisco Giants (2023); Chicago White Sox (2024); Kansas City Royals (2024); Washington Nationals (2025)

Career highlights and awards
- All-Star (2019)

Paul Sterling DeJong (də-YUNG; born August 2, 1993) is an American professional baseball shortstop and third baseman who is a free agent. He has previously played in Major League Baseball (MLB) for the St. Louis Cardinals, Toronto Blue Jays, San Francisco Giants, Chicago White Sox, Kansas City Royals, and Washington Nationals.

A native of Orlando, Florida, DeJong played college baseball at Illinois State University (ISU). He was selected by the Cardinals in the fourth round of the 2015 MLB draft. He made his MLB debut in 2017 with the Cardinals, and led National League (NL) shortstops in home runs that season with 25. In 2019, he was an All Star, and led NL shortstops in fielding percentage, assists, putouts, and double plays.

== Early life ==
DeJong was born and raised in Orlando, Florida, before moving to Antioch, Illinois, at the age of 11. His parents are Keith and Andrea DeJong, and he has a brother, Matthew, and a sister, Emma. As a child, his mother brought him to play Little League games, and remembers a coach telling her when Paul was age 5 that he would one day play in the major leagues.

He grew up an Atlanta Braves fan.

DeJong graduated from Antioch Community High School in 2011. As a senior, he batted .430 with four home runs and 30 runs batted in (RBIs), leading his team to a 21–10 record. He was named All-area, All-Lake County First-Team, and All-North Suburban Conference First-Team.

== College career ==
He attended Illinois State University where he majored in biomedicine/pre-med, and played college baseball for the Redbirds. He was a preferred walk on. As a freshman in 2013, he batted .260/.420(9th in the Missouri Valley Conference)/.320 in 100 at-bats with no home runs. He played 30 games at second base, 8 games at catcher, and two games at shortstop.

DeJong said that he increased weight training between his freshman and sophomore years, gained about 20 pounds (9.1 kg) of muscle, increasing his strength and speed. In 2014, he played 34 games at second base, 19 games at third base, six at catcher, and two at shortstop, batting .349(3rd in the conference)/.430(5th)/.596(3rd) in 218 at bats with 44 runs (6th), 21 doubles (leading the conference), three triples (4th), nine home runs (5th), and 48 runs batted in (RBIs) (4th). He was an All-MVC First-Team, and a unanimous MVC Scholar-Athlete First-Team selection. After the 2014 season, the Pittsburgh Pirates chose DeJong in the 38th round of the Major League Baseball (MLB) draft as a catcher. He did not sign with the Pirates and returned to Illinois State.

In 2014, DeJong played summer league baseball for the Wisconsin Woodchucks of the Northwoods League.

In 2015, he was named a Louisville Slugger Preseason All-American by Collegiate Baseball, and a Preseason All-American by the National Collegiate Baseball Writers Association. DeJong batted .333(9th)/.427/.605(2nd) in 210 at bats while leading the Redbirds in hits (70), runs scored (47; 10th in the conference), doubles (15; 9th), home runs (14; leading the conference), and RBIs (48; 4th). He played 27 games at second base, 20 at third base, 15 at catcher, four in right field, and also appeared at designated hitter. He was named All-Missouri Valley Conference (MVC) first team as a utility player, a Midseason All-American by D1Baseball.com, to the American Baseball Coaches Association/Rawlings Midwest All-Region Team, and a 2015 Capital One Academic All-American. He also earned Academic All-District honors for District 5.

In 2015, DeJong graduated from ISU with a degree in biochemistry with a pre-medical emphasis. He had a 3.74 GPA, and planned to attend medical school in the event a career in professional baseball did not work out. He also still had one year of college baseball eligibility remaining.

Baseball America ranked him as the 108th-best prospect for the 2015 MLB draft. The St. Louis Cardinals selected him in the fourth round (131st overall).

== Professional career ==
=== St. Louis Cardinals ===
==== Minor leagues ====
DeJong signed with the Cardinals for $200,000, and made his professional debut with the Johnson City Cardinals of the Rookie-level Appalachian League. After ten games, he was promoted to the Peoria Chiefs of the Single–A Midwest League. In 66 games between the two teams, he batted .316/.394/.516 in 256 at bats with 42 runs, nine home runs, and 41 RBIs.

In 2016, he played for the Springfield Cardinals of the Double–A Texas League, and was selected as a Texas League Mid-Season All-Star. He finished the 2016 season batting .260/.324/.460 in 496 at bats with 62 runs (7th in the league), 29 doubles (5th), 22 home runs (5th), 10 hit by pitch (2nd), 6 sacrifice flies (3rd), and 73 RBIs (5th) in 132 games. He was named an MiLB Organization All Star. After the season, the Cardinals assigned DeJong to the Glendale Desert Dogs of the Arizona Fall League (AFL), with whom he was named an AFL Rising Star.

To begin the 2017 season, the Cardinals assigned DeJong to the Memphis Redbirds of the Triple–A Pacific Coast League (PCL). In 46 games, he batted .294/.339/.571 with 11 home runs and 31 RBIs before his first major league promotion. On defense, he made 37 appearances at shortstop, four at second base, and three at third base. The Cardinals promoted DeJong to the major leagues on May 28, 2017, as they moved second baseman Kolten Wong to the disabled list (DL).

==== 2017 ====
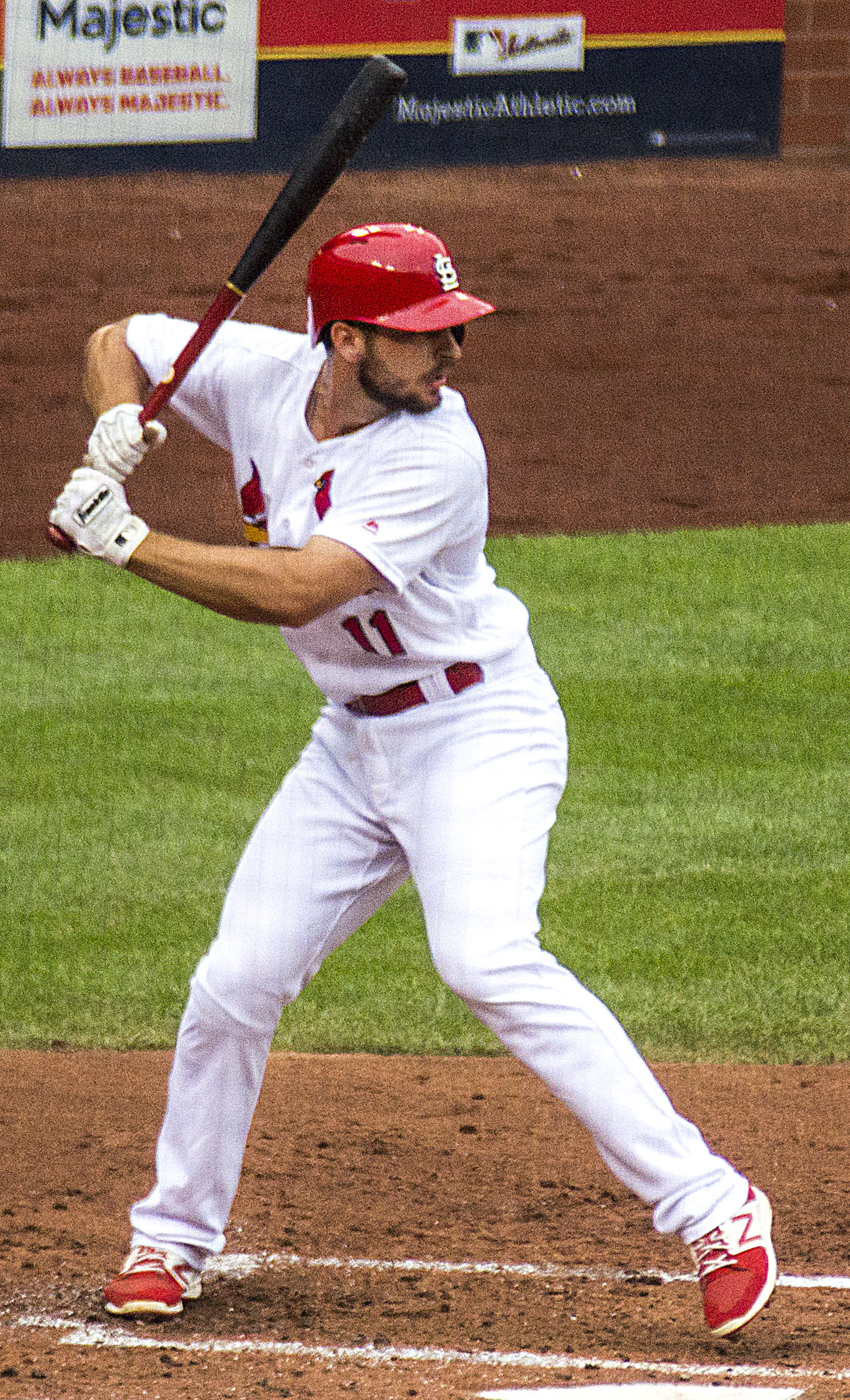
DeJong batting in 2017

DeJong made his major league debut on May 28, 2017, playing at Coors Field against the Colorado Rockies. Facing Greg Holland in his first at bat, DeJong hit a home run on his first swing, becoming the ninth Cardinals player to homer in his first at bat in the major leagues. On July 8 against the New York Mets, he set both a Cardinals shortstop and a number eight hitter record with four extra base hits in one game, including three doubles and one home run. The next day, DeJong became the first rookie in MLB history to get seven extra-base hits in a three-game series.

After batting .298/.347/.638 (.985 OPS) with eight home runs and 16 RBI in the month of July, DeJong was named the National League (NL) Rookie of the Month. He was the first Cardinals player to win the award since Wong in May 2014. DeJong became the starting shortstop in June after Aledmys Diaz was optioned to Memphis. On August 19, DeJong hit his 20th home run, becoming the fourth Cardinals' rookie to do so, in a 6−4 loss to the Pittsburgh Pirates.

DeJong finished his 2017 rookie campaign batting .285./325/.532 with 65 RBIs, and 25 home runs — the latter more than any other National League shortstop that year. Only Albert Pujols had hit more home runs as a rookie in club history, doing so in 2001. Overall, DeJong hit 38 home runs for Memphis and St. Louis. He placed second in the 2017 NL Rookie of the Year balloting behind Cody Bellinger, who won unanimously. He was named to the Baseball America Major League All-Rookie Team.

==== 2018 ====
On March 5, 2018, DeJong agreed to a six-year contract extension with St. Louis through the 2023 season worth a guaranteed total of $26 million. The deal also included two option years for a maximum value of $51.5 million. It was at the time the largest-ever agreement with a player who had not yet completed at least one full year of major league service.

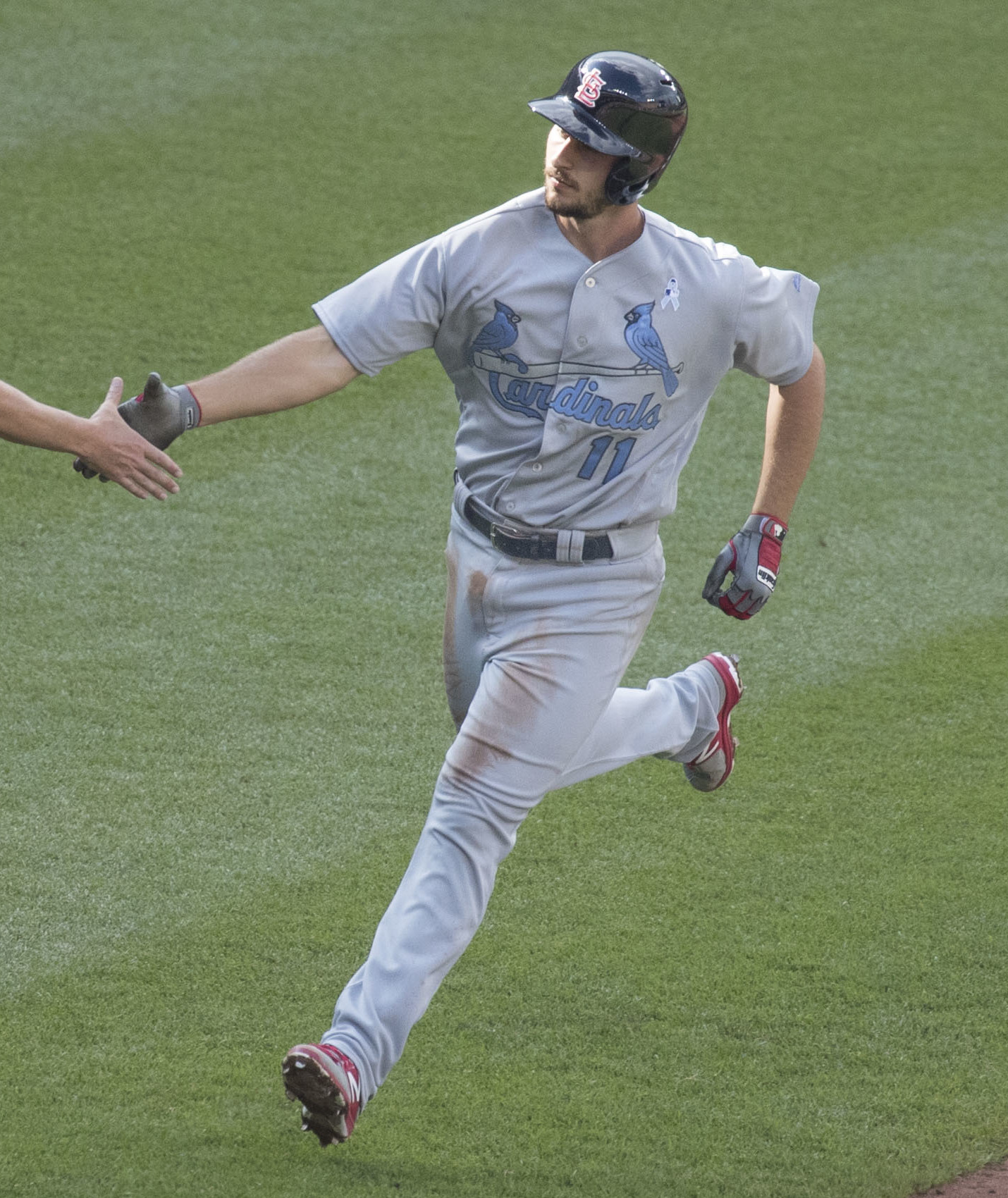
DeJong with the St. Louis Cardinals in 2017

DeJong returned in 2018 as the Cardinals' starting shortstop. His first multi-home run game came on April 1, 2018, as he hit two home runs to help lead the Cardinals to a 5–1 victory over the New York Mets. He was placed on the disabled list for the first time in his career on May 18, with a fractured left hand, after being hit in that hand the night before. DeJong underwent surgery, and did not return for seven weeks. Over 41 games prior to the injury, he slashed .260/.351/.473, with eight home runs and 19 RBIs. He was activated on July 6, and returned to the lineup that night. DeJong finished his 2018 campaign batting .241 with 19 home runs and 68 RBIs in 115 games.

==== 2019 ====
Batting .261 with 13 home runs and 36 RBIs, DeJong was selected to represent the Cardinals at the All-Star Game in Cleveland. On July 24, while playing the Pittsburgh Pirates at PNC Park, DeJong hit three home runs, becoming the first everyday St. Louis shortstop to homer three times in a game. On August 19, DeJong hit a home run that struck the 'M' letter of Big Mac Land at Busch Stadium, knocking the neon bulb out of the letter.

DeJong finished the 2019 regular season slashing .233/.318/.762 with 30 home runs and 78 RBIs over 159 games. On defense, he had the best fielding percentage of all major league shortstops (.989). Per Baseball-Reference.com, he led all National League fielders in defensive Wins Above Replacement (WAR) with 3.3 and assists (435), and NL shortstops in putouts (211) and double plays turned (119). Following the season, he was nominated for his first Gold Glove Award.

==== 2020 ====
On August 4, 2020, it was announced that DeJong had tested positive for COVID-19. He was placed on the injured list. He returned to the team on August 23, and finished the shortened season hitting .250/.322/.349, with three home runs and 25 RBIs, in 45 games.

==== 2021 ====
DeJong returned as St. Louis' starting shortstop for the 2021 season. On May 14, 2021, he was placed on the 10-day injured list due to a rib fracture. He was activated on June 11. After struggling at the plate, and combined with the positive play of Edmundo Sosa, DeJong was eventually moved into a reserve role. However, he moved back into a starting role after Sosa sustained a wrist injury in early September. DeJong finished the 2021 season with 356 at-bats over 113 games, slashing .197/.284/.390, with 19 home runs and 45 RBIs.

==== 2022 ====
Once again, DeJong returned as the Cardinals' starting shortstop for the 2022 season. On May 10, 2022, DeJong was demoted to the Triple-A Memphis Redbirds after batting .130/.209/.208 with one home run over 24 games to start the season. On July 30, the Cardinals traded Sosa to the Philadelphia Phillies. DeJong was recalled from Memphis the same day, and placed into the starting lineup as their shortstop. He hit a two-run home run in his first game back, against the Washington Nationals. On August 7, DeJong hit his 100th career home run, a three-run shot, to help lead the Cardinals to a 12–9 win and a sweep over the New York Yankees. DeJong finished the season hitting a paltry .157/.245/.286, to go with six home runs.

==== 2023 ====
After starting the 2023 season on the IL, DeJong made his season debut on April 23 against the Seattle Mariners, with two singles and a home run. In 279 at-bats, he hit .233/.297/.412.

=== Toronto Blue Jays ===
On August 1, 2023, DeJong was traded to the Toronto Blue Jays in exchange for Matt Svanson. In 13 games for Toronto, DeJong struggled immensely, going 3-for-44 (.068) with one RBI. On August 19, DeJong was designated for assignment following Bo Bichette's activation from the injured list. He was released on August 21.

=== San Francisco Giants ===
On August 22, 2023, the San Francisco Giants, who had tried and failed to trade for DeJong before the shortstop was sent to Toronto, picked him up off the waiver wire after the Blue Jays' release, signing him to a major league contract. DeJong made his debut for the Giants on August 23 against the Philadelphia Phillies. In his Giants debut, DeJong notched as many hits as he had during his full time in Toronto, going 3–for–5 with 4 RBI and a run scored. In 18 games for the Giants, he batted .184/.180/.286 with one home run and five RBI. On September 21, DeJong was released by the Giants.

=== Chicago White Sox ===
On November 28, 2023, DeJong signed a one-year contract with the Chicago White Sox for $1.75 million, with production incentives potentially increasing its value by an additional $250,000. In 102 games for Chicago in 2024, DeJong batted .228/.275/.430, along with 18 home runs and 41 RBI.

=== Kansas City Royals ===
On July 30, 2024, the White Sox traded DeJong to the Kansas City Royals in exchange for pitcher Jarold Rosado. In 37 games for Kansas City, DeJong batted .222/.277/.417, to go with six home runs and 15 RBI.

For the season, playing a combined 139 games between the White Sox and the Royals, DeJong slashed .227/.276/.427, to go with 24 home runs and 56 RBI.

=== Washington Nationals ===
On February 16, 2025, DeJong signed a one-year contract with the Washington Nationals worth $1 million, with performance incentives that could increase the pay by an additional $600,000. On April 15, DeJong was hit in the face by a 93 miles per hour (150 km/h) fastball thrown by Pittsburgh Pirates pitcher Mitch Keller, and was severely injured. He subsequently had a procedure to repair his nose and cheekbone, in which a plate was surgically implanted below one eye. After a 2 1/2-month injury delay, DeJong returned to play on July 2. He hit his first home run of the season the following day in an 11-7 win against the Detroit Tigers. He made 57 total appearances for Washington, slashing .228/.269/.373 with six home runs, 23 RBI, and four stolen bases.

=== New York Yankees ===
On January 4, 2026, DeJong signed a minor league contract with the New York Yankees. He made 23 appearances for the Triple-A Scranton/Wilkes-Barre RailRiders, slashing .203/.361/.516 with six home runs and 13 RBI. On May 1, DeJong opted out of his contract and became a free agent.

=== Detroit Tigers ===
On May 5, 2026, DeJong signed a minor league contract with the Detroit Tigers. He made six appearances for the Triple-A Toledo Mud Hens, going 3-for-21 (.143) with five RBI. On May 21, it was announced that DeJong had suffered a hamstring injury that would require season-ending surgery. He was released by the Tigers organization on May 25.

== Personal life ==
DeJong has a younger brother, Matthew, and a younger sister, Emma. He lives in Riviera Beach, Florida.

After the 2017 season, DeJong participated in a scientific study as laboratory assistant with Lawrence Rocks exploring the effects of differing temperatures on the flight of the path of the baseball. DeJong and Rocks also appeared together on MLB Now at the 2017 winter meetings. Lawrence Rocks is the father of Burton Rocks, who negotiated DeJong's first major league contract.

In 2022, Illinois State University announced that its baseball hitting facility would be named the "Paul DeJong Baseball Training Facility" to recognize DeJong's financial support of Redbird Athletics and the university.

== See also ==
- List of Illinois State University alumni
- List of Major League Baseball players with a home run in their first major league at bat
- List of people from Orlando, Florida
