= Kate Charles =

American crime writer

Kate Charles (born 1950) is an American crime writer who lives in the United Kingdom and is a British citizen.

Kate Charles was born Carol Fosher in Cincinnati, the daughter of Elmer and Kathryn Fosher. Her family moved to Bloomington, Illinois, when she was 10. She graduated from Bloomington High School and went on to Illinois State University where she graduated with a bachelor's degree in library science in 1972. She then went on to earn an MA from Indiana University Bloomington. She married Rory Chase and lives in Ludlow, Shropshire, United Kingdom. She is a past Chair of the Crime Writers' Association and the Barbara Pym Society. In 1996 she underwent open-heart surgery. She was elected to membership in the Detection Club in 2010. In 2012 she was awarded the George N. Dove Award by the Popular Culture Association for 'Outstanding Contribution to the Serious Study of Mystery and Crime Fiction', in recognition of her work as co-organiser of the annual St Hilda's (Oxford) Crime and Mystery Conference since 1994.

Charles's novels are mostly set against the background of the Church of England. Her 2005 novel, Evil Intent, was the first of her books to introduce a female Anglican priest as a central character; other series characters include solicitor David Middleton-Brown and artist Lucy Kingsley. Her novels evince a fascination with church politics.

== Novels ==
- A Drink of Deadly Wine 1991
- The Snares of Death 1992
- Appointed to Die 1993
- A Dead Man Out of Mind 1994
- Evil Angels Among Them 1995
- Unruly Passions 1998
- Strange Children 1999
- Cruel Habitations 2000
- Evil Intent 2005
- Secret Sins 2007
- Deep Waters 2009
- False Tongues 2015
- Desolate Places 2021
