= Paul Wehman =

American academic

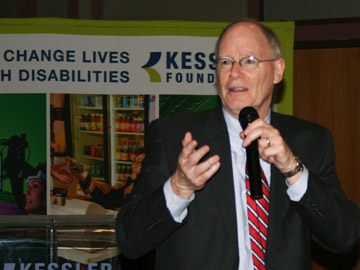
Image of Paul Wehman

Paul Wehman, Ph.D., has been a tenured faculty member at Virginia Commonwealth University since 1976. He is Director of the Rehabilitation Research and Training Center (Director 1983-2023; Interim Director 2024-present).

He holds a B.B.A. from Western Illinois University (1970), an M.S. in psychology from Illinois State University (1974), and a Ph.D. in Behavioral Disabilities/Rehabilitation Psychology from University of Wisconsin–Madison (1976).

Originally affiliated with the VCU School of Education, he later held a joint appointment with the School of Education and the School of Physical Medicine and Rehabilitation. He currently serves as Interim Director of the VCU Rehabilitation Research and Training Center (VCU-RRTC). His work has focused on supported employment and services for individuals with neurodevelopmental disabilities, brain injury, and spinal cord injury.

He has written extensively on issues related to transition from school to adulthood and special education as it relates to young adulthood and employment and is founding Editor in Chief of the Journal of Vocational Rehabilitation. Dr. Wehman has received numerous awards and has been the Principal Investigator on more than $100 million in federal and state grants since joining VCU. Dr. Wehman's work is represented in 254 journal publications, 46 books, and 143 book chapters and manuals.

His areas of interest include employment of people with disabilities, autism, special education and educational policy for at-risk youth, disability policy, assistive technology, supported employment, and related fields.

== Awards and honors ==
- 2025 National Distinguished Career Award from the Association for Rehabilitation Research, Policy and Education in Savannah, Georgia.
- 2020 Selected as Semi–finalist for Best Paper Award by ARRTC Research Committee for Competitive employment for transition-aged youth with significant impact from autism: A multi-site randomized clinical trial. Journal of Autism and Developmental Disorders.
- Recipient of the 2018 VCU Distinguished Scholarship Award at the Faculty Convocation, August 22, 2018.
- Recipient of the 2017 Leader of the Year Award from the Virginia Division of Career Development and Transition. June 9, 2017. Charlottesville, VA
- Selected as keynote speaker by Children's hospital of Philadelphia Center for Autism Research 2015 Distinguished lecture Series. Nov 10, 2015.
- ARCA 2015 Research Award for the 2014 article entitled “Effect of Supported Employment on Vocational Rehabilitation Outcomes of Transition-Age Youth with Intellectual and Developmental Disabilities: A Case Control Study,” published in Intellectual and Developmental Disabilities,52:4,296-310.
- NARRTC Honorable Mention Research Paper Award for “Effect of Supported Employment on Vocational Rehabilitation Outcomes of Transition-Age Youth with Intellectual and Developmental Disabilities: A Case Control Study,” published in Intellectual and Developmental Disabilities,52:4,296-310.
- Received Lifetime Achievement Award, Foundation for Life Care Planning Research. Minneapolis, MS. September 20, 2014.
- Recipient of the 2014 Princeton Lecture Series Fellowship by the Honorary Advisory Committee for the Eden Autism Services’ Princeton Lecture Series as a tribute to a career in the field of autism.
- Interagency Autism Coordinating Committee selected the publication “Do sheltered workshops enhance employment outcomes for adults with autism spectrum disorder?” as one of the Top 20 papers on autism research for 2012.
- Psychology Progress series named the publication “Transition from school to work for students with autism spectrum disorders: understanding the process and achieving better outcomes” as a significant contributor to the study of Autism (ASD).
- Named as one of 40 people who made significant contributions to the development of special education and disability for persons with disabilities in Chapter 4 of Hanley-Maxwell, C. & Collet-Klingenberg, L. (2011) Volume 2: Education and Disability. G. Albrecht (Ed.), SAGE Reference Series on Disability. Thousand Oaks, CA: Sage Publishing.
- International Listing of publication of Article: Effect of supported employment on the vocational outcomes of persons with traumatic brain injury", published in Journal of Applied Behavior Analysis 1989 22(4): 395–405, is listed in Psychological Database for Brain Impairment Treatment Efficacy (PsychBITE), Australia. Announced May 2011
- Nominated to Who's Who in Medicine and Healthcare 2011–2012.
- Recognized as the Kenneth L. Estabrook Distinguished Research Scientist Lecturer, Kessler Rehabilitation Foundation, West Orange, New Jersey, March 5, 2010
- Recognized with Distinction from Organization on Autism Research, October 25, 2009.
- Received VCU School of Medicine Research Recognition Award, June 2007.
- Elected Life Long Emeritus Member of APSE: The Employment Network, August 2006.
- Appointed member of Board of Directors, Association for Persons in Supported Employment, March 2004 – 2006.
- Named one of the Top 50 Most Influential Persons in the Field of Special Education for the Millennium, Journal of Remedial and Special Education, December 2000.
- Distinguished Research Lecturer, Kent State University, November 2002.
- Received VCU Distinguished Faculty Service Award 2001, September 6, 2001.
- Recipient of 1995 University of Wisconsin-Madison, School of Education, Distinguished Alumni Award.
- Invited as Keynote Speaker to First European Union on Supported Employment, Rotterdam, Netherlands, May 1994.
- Received the Distinguished Service Award from the President of the United States on Employment for Persons with Disabilities, October 7, 1992.
- Special Award for Leaders in Supported Employment. Presented at Third Annual Conference of American Association for Persons in Supported Employment, July 15, 1992, Chicago, Illinois.
- Bates, Wehman, and Renzaglia (1981) article on “Characteristics of an Appropriate Education” selected as one of the top 13 classic contributions in the area of severe disabilities. Among these 13 classic works, this article was ranked fifth overall, receiving 5 votes as the most significant of the seminal contributions in this area (Spooner, Enright, Haney, and Heller, 1993).
- Annual Award for Outstanding Service to the field of Brain Injury Rehabilitation presented at the Post-graduate course on Rehabilitation of the Brain Injured Adult and Child, June 5, 1991, Williamsburg, Va.
- International Award Winner for Joseph P. Kennedy Foundation as future leader in Mental Retardation, July 1990. Attended at home of Rose Kennedy at Hyannis, Massachusetts, July 14–15, 1990.
- Invited to White House and attended Presidential signing of the Americans with Disabilities Act, July 26, 1990.
- Distinguished Lecturer and Recipient of Liam McGuire Award for Aerlingus, September 12–16, 1989, Dublin, Ireland.
- Training Award - Region IX American Association on Mental Retardation, Philadelphia, October 20, 1988.
- Distinguished Service Award - Mid-Atlantic Rehabilitation Association 1987, Baltimore, Md, October 10, 1987.
- Corbett Reedy Award for Excellence for 1986 - Virginia Rehabilitation Association, October 1986, Charlottesville, Virginia.
- Distinguished Research Award, School of Education, VCU, Richmond, Va., 1985.
- Mary Switzer National Scholar, National Rehabilitation Association, Washington, D.C., November 13–15, 1985.
- Phi Kappa Phi Honorary Faculty Award, March 6, 1981.
- National Finalist in Joseph P. Kennedy Mental Retardation Public Policy Awards, July 1982.
- West Point Public Schools Certificate of Appreciation, December 8, 1982.
