= 96th Illinois General Assembly =

Illinois state legislative session from 2009 to 2010

←	95th	97th	→
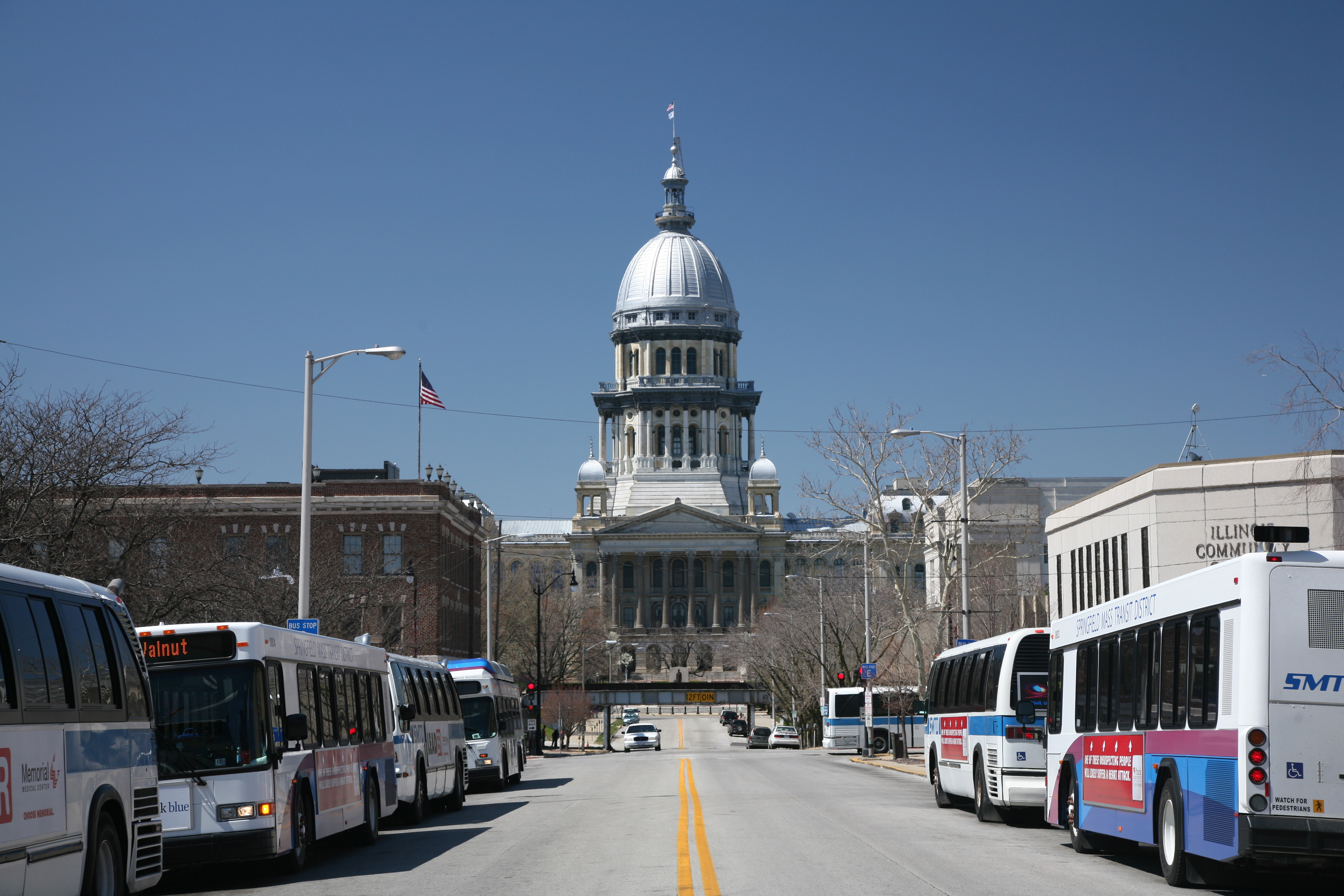
- The Illinois State Capitol in 2009

Overview
- Meeting place: Springfield, Illinois
- Term: 2009 – 2011
- Election: 2008
- Website: Official site

Illinois Senate
- President: John J. Cullerton, Democrat

Illinois House of Representatives
- Speaker: Michael J. Madigan, Democrat

The 96th Illinois General Assembly convened on January 14, 2009 and adjourned sine die on January 11, 2011. Over that period, the Illinois Senate was in session for 144 legislative days, and the Illinois House was in session for 165 legislative days.

Of the 59 members of the Senate, 40 were elected in the 2008 election, as were all 118 members of the House. The House and Senate both had Democratic Party majorities during this session.

== Legislation ==
The 96th General Assembly enacted a total of 1,555 bills into law.

These laws included the abolition of capital punishment in Illinois, which Governor Pat Quinn signed into law on March 9, 2011. There had been a moratorium on executions in Illinois since 2000.

Other measures passed included the Employee Credit Privacy Act, which prohibits employers from asking for a job applicant's credit history in most cases, and the Prevent School Violence Act, which targets school bullying based on characteristics including sexual orientation and gender identity.

On May 27, 2009, House Speaker Michael Madigan introduced an amendment to the Illinois Freedom of Information Act. His daughter, Attorney General Lisa Madigan, had worked on the draft amendment with the Illinois Press Association, the Illinois Campaign for Political Reform, the Better Government Association, and Citizen Advocacy Center. The bill passed the House the same day, then proceeded to the Senate, where it was sponsored by Kwame Raoul. The Senate concurred in the House's amendment on May 28, 2009. The governor signed the bill into law on August 17, 2009. The amendments roughly doubled the size of the Act based on its word count. The Illinois FOIA became considered one of the most liberal and comprehensive public records statutes throughout the United States. The legislation became effective on January 1, 2010, issuing the most sweeping changes to FOIA since the original enactment in 1984. The Illinois FOIA became considered one of the most liberal and comprehensive public records statutes throughout the United States.

== Removal of governor ==
Governor Rod Blagojevich was arrested by federal agents on December 9, 2008, and charged with conspiracy and soliciting bribes. In the closing days of the 95th General Assembly, the House voted 114–1 (with three abstentions) to impeach the governor. The charges brought by the House emphasized Blagojevich's alleged abuses of power and his alleged attempts to sell legislative authorizations and/or vetoes, and gubernatorial appointments including that of US President Obama's vacated Senate seat. On January 14, 2009, the 96th House voted to affirm the impeachment vote of the prior session with only Deborah Mell dissenting.

The impeachment trial in the Illinois Senate began on January 26, 2009. Blagojevich boycotted attending his own hearings, referring to them as a kangaroo court. On the first day of the 96th General Assembly, the Senate adopted rules governing the impeachment trial. By two separate and unanimous votes on January 29, the governor was removed from office and prohibited from ever holding public office in the state of Illinois again. Lieutenant Governor Patrick Quinn then became governor of Illinois.

== Senate ==
Under the 1970 Illinois Constitution, the Illinois Senate has 59 members, who are elected to overlapping two- and four-year terms. Of the 40 members elected in the 2008 Illinois Senate election, 39 were elected to four-year terms; Heather Steans of the 7th District was elected to a two-year term.

=== Senate leadership ===
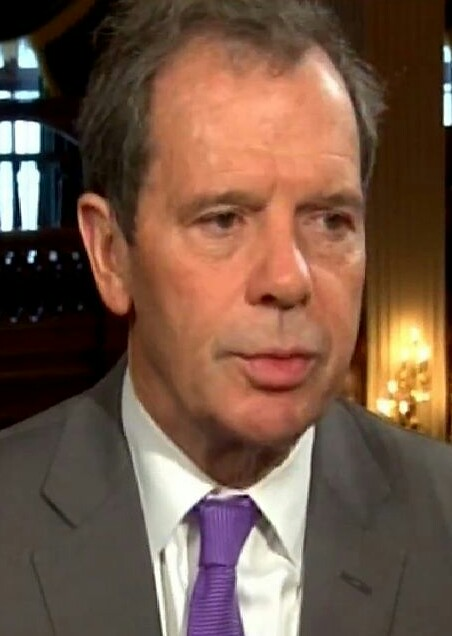
John Cullerton, president of the 96th Senate

Majority Leader James Clayborne

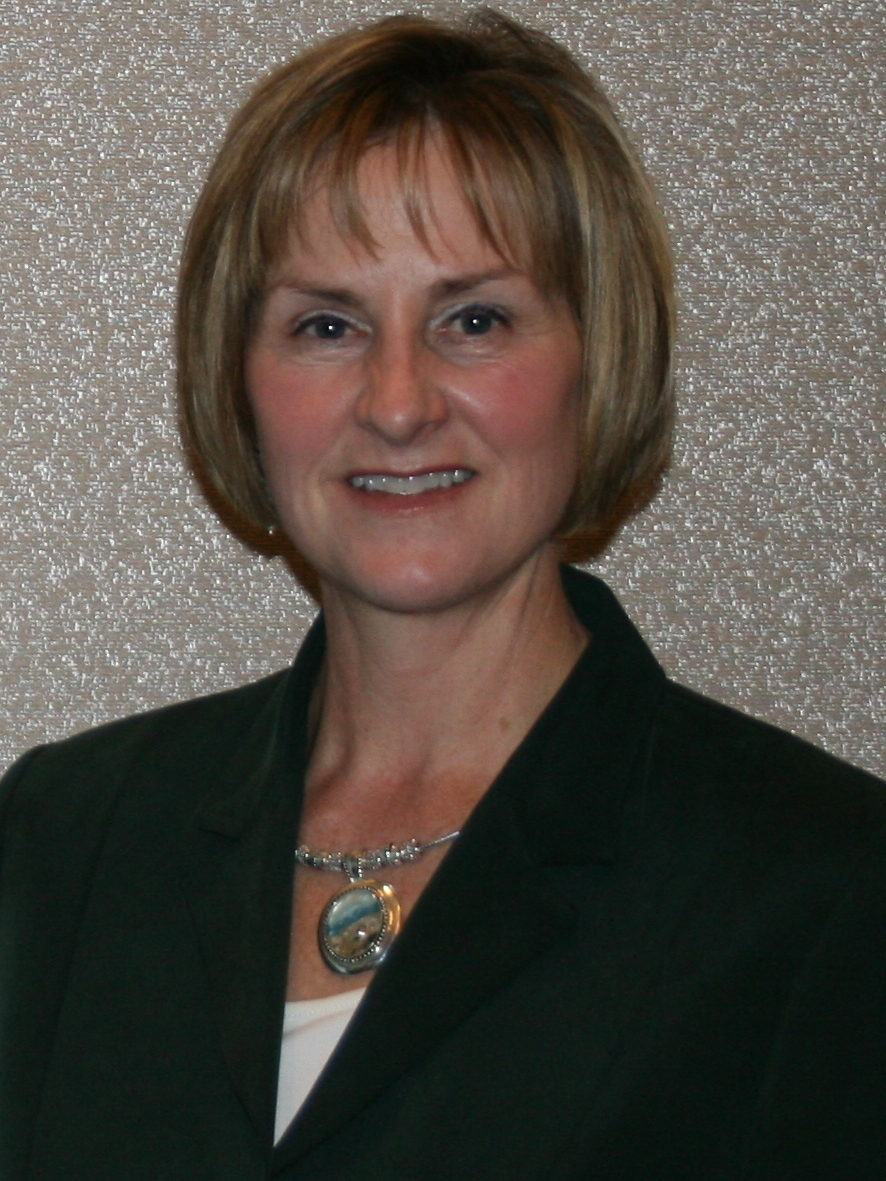
Minority Leader Christine Radogno

John Cullerton was chosen by the Senate Democratic Caucus in December 2008 to replace outgoing president Emil Jones. Jones had been a strong ally of governor Blagojevich. Cullerton was formally elected on the first day of the 96th Senate, in a party-line vote.

Position	Name	Party	District
President of the Senate	John Cullerton	Democratic	6
Majority Leader	James Clayborne Jr.	Democratic	57
Minority Leader	Christine Radogno	Republican	41

=== Party composition ===
The Senate of the 96th General Assembly consisted of 37 Democrats and 22 Republicans.

Affiliation	Members
Democratic Party	37
Republican Party	22
Total	59

=== State senators ===
District	Counties represented	Senator	Party	First year	Committees
1	Cook	Antonio Muñoz	Democratic	1999	Chair: Executive Appointments; Member: Energy; Executive; Insurance; Joint Committee on MPEA; Telecommunications & Technology
2	Cook	William Delgado	Democratic	2006	Chair: Public Health; Member: Appropriations I; Consumer Protection; Executive Appointments; Human Services; Joint Committee on Government Reform
3	Cook	Mattie Hunter	Democratic	2003	Chair: Human Services; Member: Appropriations I; Environment; Public Health; Redistricting
4	Cook	Kimberly A. Lightford	Democratic	1998	Chair: Special Committee on Education Reform; Member: Education; Executive; Executive Appointments; Financial Institutions; Labor; Redistricting
5	Cook	Rickey R. Hendon	Democratic	1993	Member: Energy; Executive; Gaming; Insurance
6	Cook	John J. Cullerton	Democratic	1991	Chair: Joint Committee on Government Reform; Joint Committee on MPEA; Special Committee on Workers' Comp Reform; Member: Executive
7	Cook	Heather Steans	Democratic	2008	Chair: Special Committee on Medicaid Reform; Member: Appropriations II; Deficit Reduction; Education; Environment; Human Services; Public Health
8	Cook	Ira I. Silverstein	Democratic	1999	Chair: Executive; Member: Financial Institutions; Gaming; Insurance; Judiciary; Special Committee on Workers' Comp Reform
9	Cook	Jeffrey M. Schoenberg	Democratic	2003	Member: Appropriations I; Appropriations II; Financial Institutions; Public Health; Revenue
10	Cook	James A. DeLeo	Democratic	1993	Member: Executive Appointments; Executive
10	Cook	John G. Mulroe	Democratic	2010	Member: Executive
11	Cook	Louis S. Viverito	Democratic	1995	Chair: Revenue; Member: Assignments; Elections; Executive Appointments; State Government & Veterans Affairs
12	Cook	Martin A. Sandoval	Democratic	2003	Chair: Transportation; Member: Appropriations II; Energy; Licensed Activities
13	Cook	Kwame Raoul	Democratic	2004	Chair: Pensions and Investments; Redistricting; Member: Consumer Protection; Criminal Law; Joint Committee on MPEA; Judiciary; Telecommunications & Technology
14	Cook	Emil Jones III	Democratic	2009	Member: Appropriations I; Commerce; Energy; Labor; Licensed Activities; State Government & Veterans Affairs
15	Cook	James T. Meeks	Democratic	2003	Chair: Education; Member: Elections; Higher Education; Revenue
16	Cook	Jacqueline Y. Collins	Democratic	2003	Chair: Financial Institutions; Member: Appropriations I; Environment; Insurance; Pensions and Investments
17	Cook	Donne E. Trotter	Democratic	1993	Chair: Appropriations I; Deficit Reduction; Member: Appropriations II; Energy; Pensions and Investments; Special Committee on Medicaid Reform
18	Cook	Edward D. Maloney	Democratic	2003	Chair: Higher Education; Member: Appropriations II; Consumer Protection; Deficit Reduction; Joint Committee on MPEA; Labor; Redistricting; Special Committee on Education Reform
19	Cook, Will	M. Maggie Crotty	Democratic	2003	Chair: Elections; Member: Higher Education; Joint Committee on Government Reform; Labor; Local Government; Revenue
20	Cook	Iris Y. Martinez	Democratic	2003	Chair: Licensed Activities; Member: Commerce; Deficit Reduction; Education; Energy; Pensions and Investments; Redistricting
21	Cook, DuPage	Dan Cronin	Republican	1993	Member: Education; Higher Education; Joint Committee on Government Reform; Labor; Public Health; Telecommunications and Information Technology
21	Cook, DuPage	Ronald Sandack	Republican	2010	Member: Education; Higher Education; Joint Committee on Government Reform; Labor; Public Health; Telecommunications & Technology
22	Cook, Kane	Michael Noland	Democratic	2007	Chair: Criminal Law; Member: Energy; Judiciary; Licensed Activities; Public Health
23	DuPage	Carole Pankau	Republican	2005	Member: Appropriations II; Deficit Reduction; Energy; Environment; Executive; Labor; Public Health
24	DuPage, Will	Kirk W. Dillard	Republican	1993	Member: Assignments; Criminal Law; Energy; Gaming; Joint Committee on MPEA; Judiciary; Licensed Activities; Redistricting; Special Committee on Workers' Comp Reform
25	Kane, Kendall, La Salle	Chris Lauzen	Republican	1993	Member: Appropriations I; Appropriations II; Consumer Protection; Pensions and Investments; Public Health; Revenue
26	Cook, Lake, McHenry	Dan Duffy	Republican	2009	Member: Commerce; Consumer Protection; Executive Appointments; Human Services; Insurance; Joint Committee on MPEA; Pensions and Investments
27	Cook, Lake	Matt Murphy	Republican	2007	Chair: Deficit Reduction; Member: Appropriations I; Appropriations II; Judiciary; Redistricting; Revenue; Telecommunications & Technology
28	Cook, DuPage, Kane	John J. Millner	Republican	2005	Member: Criminal Law; Executive Appointments; Financial Institutions; Licensed Activities; Telecommunications & Technology; Transportation
29	Cook, Lake	Susan Garrett	Democratic	2003	Chair: Environment; Member: Commerce; Education; Joint Committee on Government Reform; Public Health; Revenue
30	Cook, Lake	Terry Link	Democratic	1997	Chair: Gaming; Member: Elections; Financial Institutions; Judiciary; Local Government
31	Lake	Michael Bond	Democratic	2007	Chair: Telecommunications & Technology; Member: Appropriations II; Elections; Redistricting; Transportation
32	McHenry	Pamela J. Althoff	Republican	2003	Member: Appropriations I; Appropriations II; Deficit Reduction; Higher Education; Labor; Licensed Activities; Local Government; Special Committee on Medicaid Reform
33	Cook	Dan Kotowski	Democratic	2007	Chair: Commerce; Member: Appropriations II; Criminal Law; Financial Institutions; Human Services
34	Winnebago	Dave Syverson	Republican	1993	Member: Appropriations I; Deficit Reduction; Energy; Gaming; Human Services; Insurance; Public Health; Special Committee on Medicaid Reform
35	Boone, De Kalb, Ogle, Winnebago	J. Bradley Burzynski	Republican	1993	Chair: Special Committee on Education Reform; Member: Education; Executive; Higher Education; Insurance; Local Government; Redistricting
36	Carroll, Henry, Mercer, Rock Island, Whiteside	Mike Jacobs	Democratic	2005	Chair: Energy; Member: Appropriations I; Insurance; Joint Committee on MPEA; Revenue; Telecommunications & Technology
37	Bureau, Henry, Knox, Marshall, Peoria, Stark, Woodford	Dale E. Risinger	Republican	2003	Member: Energy; Environment; Gaming; Human Services; Insurance; Transportation
38	Bureau, Grundy, Iroquois, Kankakee, La Salle, Putnam, Will	Gary G. Dahl	Republican	2005	Member: Local Government; Agriculture and Conservation; Consumer Protection; Human Services; State Government and Veterans’ Affairs; Transportation
38	Bureau, Grundy, Iroquois, Kankakee, La Salle, Putnam, Will	Sue Rezin	Republican	2010	Member: Consumer Protection; Local Government; State Government & Veterans Affairs; Transportation
39	Cook, DuPage	Don Harmon	Democratic	2003	Member: Assignments; Environment; Executive; Executive Appointments; Judiciary; Redistricting; Telecommunications & Technology
40	Cook, Iroquois, Kankakee, Will	Toi W. Hutchinson	Democratic	2009	Member: Agriculture and Conservation; Labor; Local Government; State Government & Veterans Affairs; Transportation
41	Cook, DuPage, Will	Christine Radogno	Republican	1997	Chair: Special Committee on Workers' Comp Reform; Member: Executive; Joint Committee on Government Reform; Joint Committee on MPEA
42	Kane, Kendall, Will	Linda Holmes	Democratic	2007	Chair: Consumer Protection; Member: Agriculture and Conservation; Gaming; Labor; Local Government; State Government & Veterans Affairs
43	Will	A. J. Wilhelmi	Democratic	2005	Chair: Judiciary; Member: Agriculture and Conservation; Criminal Law; Gaming; Transportation
44	Christian, De Witt, Logan, Macon, McLean, Sangamon, Tazewell	Bill Brady	Republican	2002	Member: Energy; Environment; Insurance; Pensions and Investments; Revenue
45	Carroll, Henry, Jo Daviess, Lee, Ogle, Stephenson, Whiteside, Winnebago	Tim Bivins	Republican	2008	Member: Agriculture and Conservation; Appropriations I; Commerce; Criminal Law; Joint Committee on Government Reform; State Government & Veterans Affairs
46	Fulton, Peoria, Tazewell	David Koehler	Democratic	2006	Chair: Local Government; Member: Agriculture and Conservation; Energy; Higher Education; Special Committee on Medicaid Reform; Transportation
47	Adams, Brown, Cass, Fulton, Hancock, Henderson, Mason, McDonough, Mercer, Pike, Schuyler, Scott, Warren	John M. Sullivan	Democratic	2003	Chair: Appropriations II; Member: Deficit Reduction; Financial Institutions; Higher Education; Pensions and Investments; Transportation
48	DuPage, Kane, Kendall	Randall M. Hultgren	Republican	2007	
48	DuPage, Kane, Kendall	Thomas Johnson	Republican	2011	Member: Judiciary; Labor; Revenue
49	Calhoun, Christian, Fayette, Greene, Jersey, Macoupin, Madison, Montgomery, Morgan, Pike, Shelby	Deanna Demuzio	Democratic	2004	Chair: State Government & Veterans Affairs; Member: Agriculture and Conservation; Education; Human Services; Redistricting
50	Logan, Menard, Sangamon	Larry K. Bomke	Republican	1995	Member: Appropriations II; Financial Institutions; Local Government; Pensions and Investments; Transportation
51	Bond, Champaign, Clinton, De Witt, Effingham, Fayette, Macon, Madison, McLean, Piatt, Shelby, St. Clair	Frank C. Watson; Resigned February 16, 2009.	Republican	1983	
51	Bond, Champaign, Clinton, De Witt, Effingham, Fayette, Macon, Madison, McLean, Piatt, Shelby, St. Clair	Kyle McCarter	Republican	2009	Member: Agriculture and Conservation; Commerce; Education; Financial Institutions; Licensed Activities; Special Committee on Workers' Comp Reform; State Government & Veterans Affairs
52	Champaign, Vermilion	Michael W. Frerichs	Democratic	2007	Chair: Agriculture and Conservation; Member: Commerce; Education; Higher Education; Licensed Activities
53	Champaign, Ford, Iroquois, Livingston, Marshall, McLean, Tazewell, Woodford	Dan Rutherford	Republican	2003	Member: Financial Institutions; Elections; Executive Appointments; Redistricting; Telecommunications and Information Technology}
53	Champaign, Ford, Iroquois, Livingston, Marshall, McLean, Tazewell, Woodford	Shane Cultra	Republican	2011	Member: Elections; Executive Appointments; Financial Institutions; Redistricting; Telecommunications & Technology
54	Bond, Clay, Clinton, Edwards, Effingham, Hamilton, Jasper, Jefferson, Marion, Richland, Wayne, White	John O. Jones	Republican	2003	Member: Agriculture and Conservation; Energy; Environment; Executive; Gaming; State Government & Veterans Affairs
55	Champaign, Clark, Coles, Crawford, Cumberland, Douglas, Edgar, Effingham, Lawrence, Piatt, Shelby, Wabash	Dale A. Righter	Republican	2003	Chair: Special Committee on Medicaid Reform; Member: Assignments; Criminal Law; Elections; Executive; Judiciary; Redistricting; Telecommunications & Technology
56	Jersey, Madison, St. Clair	William R. Haine	Democratic	2002	Chair: Insurance; Member: Criminal Law; Judiciary; Licensed Activities; Special Committee on Workers' Comp Reform; Telecommunications & Technology
57	St. Clair	James F. Clayborne Jr.	Democratic	1995	Chair: Assignments; Member: Energy; Executive; Joint Committee on Government Reform; Pensions and Investments; Telecommunications & Technology
58	Clinton, Jackson, Monroe, Perry, Randolph, St. Clair, Washington	David Luechtefeld	Republican	1995	Member: Commerce; Consumer Protection; Education; Elections; Executive Appointments; Higher Education; Special Committee on Education Reform
59	Alexander, Franklin, Gallatin, Hamilton, Hardin, Johnson, Massac, Pope, Pulaski, Saline, Union, White, Williamson	Gary Forby	Democratic	2003	Chair: Labor; Member: Consumer Protection; Insurance; Telecommunications & Technology; Transportation

== House ==
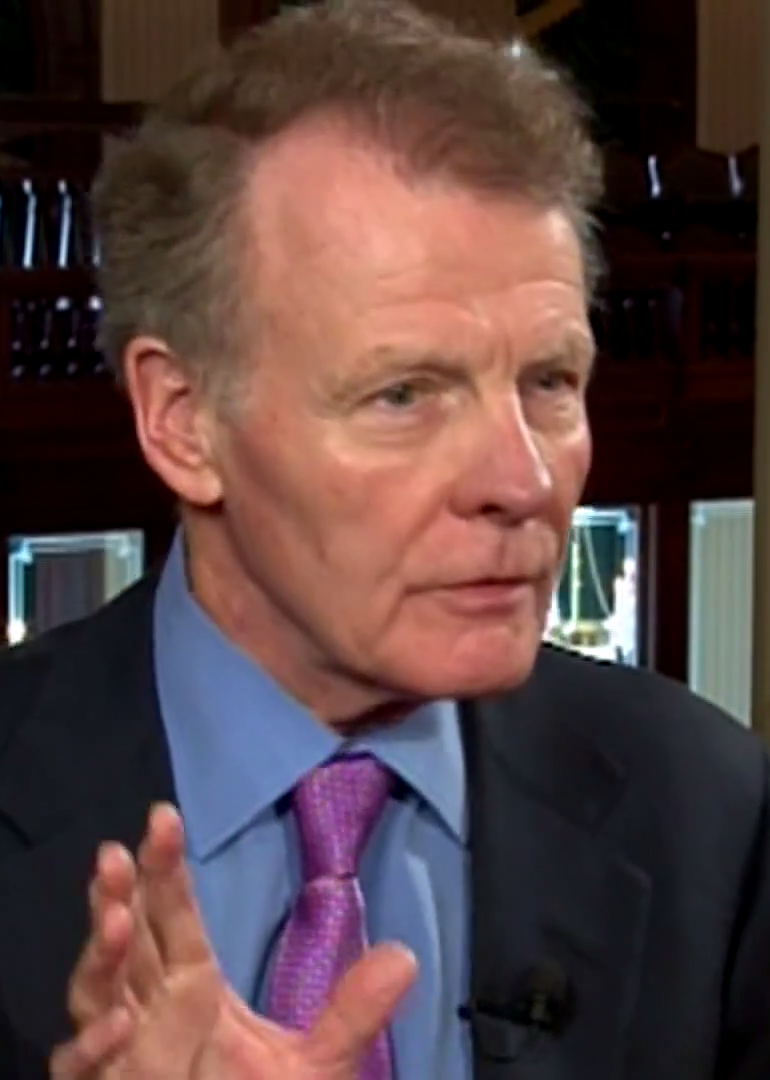
Michael Madigan, Speaker of the 96th House

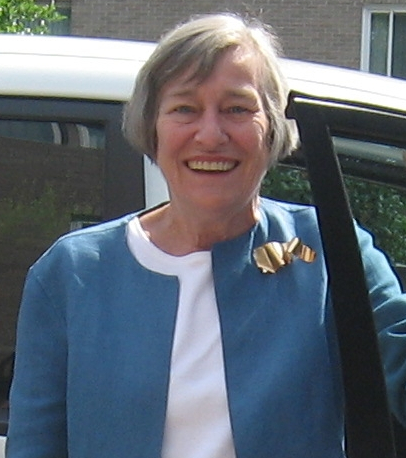
Majority Leader Barbara Flynn Currie

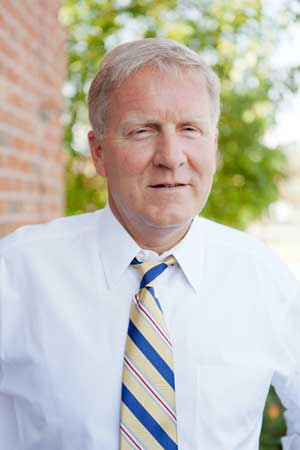
Minority Leader Tom Cross

The Illinois House has 118 members, who all serve two-year terms.

=== House leadership ===
Position	Name	Party	District
Speaker of the House	Michael J. Madigan	Democratic	22
Majority Leader	Barbara Flynn Currie	Democratic	25
Minority Leader	Tom Cross	Republican	84

=== Party composition ===
The House of the 96th General Assembly consisted of 70 Democrats and 48 Republicans.

Affiliation	Members
Democratic Party	70
Republican Party	48
Total	118

=== State representatives ===
District	Counties represented	Representative	Party	First year	Committees
1	Cook	Susana A. Mendoza	Democratic	2001	Chair: International Trade & Commerce; Member: Bio-Technology; Labor; Public Utilities; Railroad Industry
2	Cook	Edward J. Acevedo	Democratic	1997	Member: Appropriations-Elementary & Secondary Education; Business Occupational Licenses; Executive; Financial Institutions; Joint Committee on Government Reform; Joint Committee on Pier; Personnel & Pensions; Special Investigative Committee; Telecommunications
3	Cook	Luis Arroyo	Democratic	2007	Chair: Infrastructure; Mass Transit; Member: Business Occupational Licenses; Executive; Public Utilities
4	Cook	Cynthia Soto	Democratic	2001	Chair: Appropriations-Higher Education; Member: Appropriations-Elementary & Secondary Education; Appropriations-Public Safety; Financial Institutions; Labor; Mass Transit; Transportation, Regulation, Roads and Bridges
5	Cook	Kenneth Dunkin	Democratic	2002	Chair: Tourism & Conventions; Member: Appropriations-Higher Education; Financial Institutions; Insurance; International Trade & Commerce; Juvenile Justice Reform
6	Cook	Esther Golar	Democratic	2006	Chair: Disability Services; Public Policy & Accountability; Member: Elementary & Secondary Education; Health Care Availability Access; Judiciary II - Criminal Law; Medicaid Reform Committee; Medicaid Reform; Family & Children
7	Cook	Karen A. Yarbrough	Democratic	2001	Chair: Appropriations-Public Safety; Member: Appropriations-Higher Education; Cities & Villages; Computer Technology; Education Reform; Elementary & Secondary Education; Environmental Health; Insurance; Public Policy & Accountability; Railroad Industry; Tourism & Conventions
8	Cook	LaShawn K. Ford	Democratic	2007	Member: Access to Federal Funding; Insurance; Juvenile Justice Reform; Revenue & Finance; Youth & Family
9	Cook	Arthur L. Turner	Democratic	1981	Member: Executive; Investigative; Joint Committee on Government Reform; Prison Reform; Revenue & Finance; Rules; Telecommunications
9	Cook	Arthur Turner	Democratic	2010	
10	Cook	Annazette Collins	Democratic	2001	Chair: Juvenile Justice Reform; Public Utilities; Member: Human Services; Judiciary II - Criminal Law; Renewable Energy; State Government Administration
11	Cook	John A. Fritchey	Democratic	1996	Chair: Judiciary I-Civil Law; Member: Business Occupational Licenses; Financial Institutions; Insurance; Investigative; Mass Transit
11	Cook	Kathleen C Moore	Democratic	2010	Member: Mass Transit
12	Cook	Sara Feigenholtz	Democratic	1995	Chair: Adoption Reform; Appropriations-Human Services; Member: Insurance; Joint Committee on Pier; Mass Transit; Medicaid Reform Committee; Tourism & Conventions
13	Cook	Greg Harris	Democratic	2006	Chair: Youth & Family; Member: Aging; Appropriations-Public Safety; Health Care Availability Access; Health Care Licenses; Homeland Security & Emergency Preparation; Insurance; Joint Committee on Pier
14	Cook	Harry Osterman	Democratic	2000	Chair: Labor; Member: Appropriations-Human Services; Elementary & Secondary Education; Financial Institutions; Mass Transit
15	Cook	John D'Amico	Democratic	2004	Chair: Vehicles & Safety; Member: Aging; Elections & Campaign Reform; Labor; Transportation, Regulation, Roads and Bridges
16	Cook	Lou Lang	Democratic	1987	Member: Insurance; Joint Committee on Government Reform; Judiciary I - Civil Law; Rules; Special Investigative Committee; Telecommunications
17	Cook	Elizabeth Coulson	Republican	1997	Member: Appropriations-Elementary & Secondary Education; Appropriations-Human Services; Business Occupational Licenses; Disability Services; Financial Institutions; Health & Healthcare Disparities; Health Care Licenses; Joint Committee on Government Reform
18	Cook	Julie Hamos	Democratic	1999	Chair: Mass Transit; Member: Computer Technology; Agriculture & Conservation; Environment & Energy; Environmental Health; Financial Institutions; Investigative; Judiciary I-Civil Law; Railroad Industry
18	Cook	Robyn Gabel	Democratic	2010	Member: Appropriations-Human Services; Environment & Energy; Health & Healthcare Disparities; Insurance; Mass Transit; Medicaid Reform Committee
19	Cook	Joseph M. Lyons	Democratic	1996	Member: Aging; Executive; Financial Institutions; Telecommunications; Transportation, Regulation, Roads and Bridges; Veterans' Affairs
20	Cook	Michael P. McAuliffe	Republican	1997	Chair: Veterans' Affairs; Member: Appropriations-Public Safety; Business Occupational Licenses; Health Care Licenses; Personnel & Pensions; Transportation, Regulation, Roads and Bridges; Youth & Family
21	Cook	Michael J. Zalewski	Democratic	2009	Member: Appropriations-Public Safety; Counties & Townships; Health Care Availability Access; Judiciary I - Civil Law; Revenue & Finance; Vehicles & Safety; Workers' Compensation Reform
22	Cook	Michael J. Madigan	Democratic	1971	Chair: Joint Committee on Government Reform; Joint Committee on Pier; Member: Executive
23	Cook	Daniel J. Burke	Democratic	1991	Chair: Executive; Member: Business Occupational Licenses; Financial Institutions; Fire Protection; Personnel & Pensions; Tourism & Conventions
24	Cook	Elizabeth Hernandez	Democratic	2007	Member: Appropriations-Elementary & Secondary Education; Appropriations-Human Services; Consumer Protection; Disability Services; Health & Healthcare Disparities; Labor; Medicaid Reform Committee; Medicaid Reform; Family & Children
25	Cook	Barbara Flynn Currie	Democratic	1979	Chair: Medicaid Reform Committee; Rules; Special Investigative Committee; Member: Joint Committee on Government Reform; Judiciary I - Civil Law; Revenue & Finance
26	Cook	William D. Burns	Democratic	2009	Member: Appropriations-Elementary & Secondary Education; Health & Healthcare Disparities; Health Care Availability Access; Infrastructure; Joint Committee on Pier; Judiciary I - Civil Law; State Government Administration; Youth & Family
27	Cook	Monique D. Davis	Democratic	1987	Chair: Insurance; Member: Appropriations-General Service; Appropriations-Higher Education; Elementary & Secondary Education; Financial Institutions; Juvenile Justice Reform; Railroad Industry; Special Investigative Committee; State Government Administration; Tourism & Conventions
28	Cook	Robert Rita	Democratic	2003	Chair: Business Occupational Licenses; Tollway Oversight; Member: Appropriations-Public Safety; Computer Technology; Consumer Protection; Counties & Townships; Environmental Health; Executive; Health & Healthcare Disparities; Tourism & Conventions
29	Cook	David E. Miller	Democratic	2001	Member: Appropriations-Higher Education; Business Occupational Licenses; Elementary & Secondary Education; Health Care Licenses; Mass Transit; Transportation, Regulation, Roads and Bridges
30	Cook	William Davis	Democratic	2003	Chair: Health & Healthcare Disparities; Member: Appropriations-Elementary & Secondary Education; Appropriations-Higher Education; International Trade & Commerce; Labor; Railroad Industry; Tollway Oversight
31	Cook	Mary E. Flowers	Democratic	1985	Chair: Health Care Availability Access; Member: Agriculture & Conservation; Appropriations-Higher Education; Health & Healthcare Disparities; Higher Education; Human Services; Medicaid Reform Committee; Medicaid Reform; Family & Children; Special Investigative Committee
32	Cook	André M. Thapedi	Democratic	2009	Member: Infrastructure; Judiciary I - Civil Law; Public Utilities; Workers' Compensation Reform
33	Cook	Marlow H. Colvin	Democratic	2001	Chair: Consumer Protection; Member: Appropriations-Public Safety; Elementary & Secondary Education; Insurance; Labor; Personnel & Pensions; Telecommunications
34	Cook	Constance A. Howard	Democratic	1995	Chair: Judiciary II - Criminal Law; Member: Appropriations-Public Safety; Computer Technology; Human Services; Labor; Prison Reform; Railroad Industry; Special Investigative Committee; Transportation, Regulation, Roads and Bridges
35	Cook	Kevin Joyce	Democratic	2003	Chair: Appropriations-General Services; Member: Appropriations-Higher Education; Vehicles & Safety; Financial Institutions; Railroad Industry; Veterans’ Affairs
35	Cook	John M. O'Sullivan	Democratic	2010	Member: Vehicles & Safety
36	Cook	James D. Brosnahan	Democratic	1997	Chair: Financial Institutions; Telecommunications; Member: Appropriations-General Services; Appropriations-Higher Education; Judiciary I-Civil Law; Personnel & Pensions
36	Cook	Michael J. Carberry	Democratic	2010	
37	Cook, Will	Kevin A. McCarthy	Democratic	1997	Chair: Personnel & Pensions; Telecommunications; Member: Environmental Health; Financial Institutions; Health Care Licenses; Higher Education
38	Cook	Al Riley	Democratic	2007	Member: Appropriations-Elementary & Secondary Education; Appropriations-General Service; Cities & Villages; Counties & Townships; Infrastructure; Mass Transit; Tollway Oversight; Youth & Family
39	Cook	Maria Antonia Berrios	Democratic	2003	Chair: Bio-Technology; Member: Executive; Infrastructure; Insurance; International Trade & Commerce; Mass Transit
40	Cook	Deborah Mell	Democratic	2009	Member: Aging; Appropriations-Human Services; Elections & Campaign Reform; Insurance; Mass Transit
41	DuPage	Bob Biggins	Republican	1993	Member: Aging; Appropriations-General Service; Executive; Mass Transit; Revenue & Finance; Tollway Oversight
42	Cook, DuPage	Sandra M. Pihos	Republican	2003	Member: Aging; Appropriations-Elementary & Secondary Education; Consumer Protection; Disability Services; Elementary & Secondary Education; Homeland Security & Emergency Preparation; Public Policy & Accountability
43	Cook, Kane	Keith Farnham	Democratic	2009	Member: Aging; Appropriations-Human Services; Consumer Protection; Education Reform; State Government Administration; Veterans' Affairs
44	Cook	Fred Crespo	Democratic	2007	Member: Cities & Villages; Consumer Protection; Disability Services; Electric Generation & Commerce; Elementary & Secondary Education; Mass Transit; Public Utilities; State Government Administration
45	DuPage	Franco Coladipietro	Republican	2007	Member: Aging; Business Occupational Licenses; Financial Institutions; Homeland Security & Emergency Preparation; International Trade & Commerce; Judiciary I - Civil Law; Public Utilities
46	DuPage	Dennis M. Reboletti	Republican	2007	Member: Environment & Energy; Judiciary II - Criminal Law; Juvenile Justice Reform; Prison Reform; Transportation, Regulation, Roads and Bridges; Vehicles & Safety; Veterans' Affairs
47	DuPage	Patricia R. Bellock	Republican	1999	Chair: Medicaid Reform Committee; Family & Children; Member: Appropriations-Human Services; Financial Institutions; Human Services; Labor; Mass Transit; Medicaid Reform; Special Investigative Committee
48	DuPage, Will	Michael G. Connelly	Republican	2009	Member: Appropriations-Public Safety; Business Occupational Licenses; Health Care Availability Access; Judiciary I - Civil Law; Public Utilities; Tourism & Conventions; Veterans' Affairs
49	Kane	Timothy L. Schmitz	Republican	1999	Member: Appropriations-Human Services; Elections & Campaign Reform; Environmental Health; Health Care Availability Access; Human Services; Joint Committee on Pier; Labor; Rules; Telecommunications
50	Kane, Kendall, La Salle	Kay Hatcher	Republican	2009	Member: Aging; Appropriations-Public Safety; Counties & Townships; Tourism & Conventions; Transportation, Regulation, Roads and Bridges; Vehicles & Safety
51	Lake	Ed Sullivan Jr.	Republican	2003	Member: Consumer Protection; Education Reform; Electric Utility Oversight; Executive; Labor; Mass Transit; Public Utilities; Revenue & Finance; Telecommunications
52	Cook, Lake, McHenry	Mark H. Beaubien Jr.	Republican	1996	Member: Consumer Protection; Insurance; International Trade & Commerce; Labor; Mass Transit; Medicaid Reform; Family & Children; Revenue & Finance
53	Cook, Lake	Sidney H. Mathias	Republican	1999	Member: Appropriations-General Service; Cities & Villages; Judiciary I - Civil Law; Mass Transit; Railroad Industry; Tollway Oversight
54	Cook	Suzanne Bassi	Republican	1999	Member: Appropriations-Elementary & Secondary Education; Elementary & Secondary Education; Infrastructure; Mass Transit; Revenue & Finance; Special Investigative Committee; State Government Administration; Tourism & Conventions
55	Cook, DuPage, Kane	Randy Ramey Jr.	Republican	2005	Member: Appropriations-General Service; Consumer Protection; Counties & Townships; Health & Healthcare Disparities; Infrastructure; State Government Administration; Telecommunications
56	Cook, DuPage	Paul D. Froehlich	Democratic	2003	Chair: Cities & Villages; Member: Elementary & Secondary Education; Environmental Health; Prison Reform; Railroad Industry; State Government Administration
57	Cook	Elaine Nekritz	Democratic	2003	Chair: Elections & Campaign Reform; Railroad Industry; Member: Appropriations-Higher Education; Environment & Energy; Environmental Health; Judiciary I - Civil Law; Mass Transit; Medicaid Reform; Family & Children; Personnel & Pensions; Tollway Oversight; Veterans' Affairs; Workers' Compensation Reform
58	Lake	Karen May	Democratic	2001	Chair: Environmental Health; Renewable Energy; Member: Electric Utility Oversight; Environment & Energy; Health Care Availability Access; Mass Transit; Personnel & Pensions; Public Policy & Accountability
59	Cook, Lake	Kathleen A. Ryg	Democratic	2003	Member: Public Policy & Accountability
59	Cook, Lake	Carol A. Sente	Democratic	2009	Member: Aging; Appropriations-Human Services; Cities & Villages; Disability Services; Renewable Energy
60	Lake	Eddie Washington	Democratic	2003	Chair: Aging; Prison Reform; Member: Appropriations-Public Safety; Appropriations-Human Services; Labor; Mass Transit
60	Lake	Rita Mayfield	Democratic	2010	Member: Mass Transit
61	Lake	JoAnn D. Osmond	Republican	2003	Member: Electric Generation & Commerce; Health Care Availability Access; Insurance; Judiciary I - Civil Law; Labor; Rules; Telecommunications; Veterans' Affairs
62	Lake	Sandy Cole	Republican	2007	Member: Adoption Reform; Appropriations-Elementary & Secondary Education; Computer Technology; Environment & Energy; Human Services; Medicaid Reform Committee; Renewable Energy; Tollway Oversight; Tourism & Conventions
63	McHenry	Jack D. Franks	Democratic	1999	Chair: State Government Administration; Member: Aging; Bio-Technology; International Trade & Commerce; Public Utilities; Special Investigative Committee; Veterans' Affairs
64	McHenry	Michael W. Tryon	Republican	2005	Member: Bio-Technology; Environment & Energy; Environmental Health; Executive; Labor; Mass Transit; Medicaid Reform Committee; Railroad Industry
65	Cook	Rosemary Mulligan	Republican	1993	Member: Access to Federal Funding; Appropriations-Elementary & Secondary Education; Appropriations-Human Services; Business Occupational Licenses; Health Care Availability Access; Health Care Licenses; Medicaid Reform Committee; Medicaid Reform; Family & Children
66	Cook	Mark L. Walker	Democratic	2009	Member: Access to Federal Funding; Appropriations-Human Services; Cities & Villages; International Trade & Commerce; Veterans' Affairs
67	Winnebago	Charles E. Jefferson	Democratic	2001	Member: Aging; Consumer Protection; Juvenile Justice Reform; Labor; Public Utilities; Tourism & Conventions
68	Winnebago	Dave Winters	Republican	1995	Member: Electric Generation & Commerce; Electric Utility Oversight; Environment & Energy; Environmental Health; Railroad Industry; Telecommunications; Workers' Compensation Reform; Youth & Family
69	Boone, De Kalb, Winnebago	Ronald A. Wait	Republican	1983	Member: Appropriations-Public Safety; Cities & Villages; Judiciary I - Civil Law; Judiciary II - Criminal Law; State Government Administration; Transportation, Regulation, Roads and Bridges; Veterans' Affairs
70	De Kalb, Ogle	Robert W. Pritchard	Republican	2003	Member: Appropriations-Elementary & Secondary Education; Appropriations-Higher Education; Education Reform; Elementary & Secondary Education; Financial Institutions; Higher Education; Insurance; Medicaid Reform Committee; Veterans' Affairs
71	Carroll, Henry, Rock Island, Whiteside	Mike Boland	Democratic	1995	Chair: Higher Education; Member: Elections & Campaign Reform; Health & Healthcare Disparities; State Government Administration
72	Mercer, Rock Island	Patrick J. Verschoore	Democratic	2003	Chair: Counties & Townships; Member: Agriculture & Conservation; Electric Generation & Commerce; Environment & Energy; Health Care Licenses; Veterans' Affairs
73	Bureau, Marshall, Peoria, Woodford	David R. Leitch	Republican	1986	Member: Appropriations-Human Services; Disability Services; Financial Institutions; Health & Healthcare Disparities; Insurance; Labor; Medicaid Reform Committee
74	Bureau, Henry, Knox, Stark	Donald L. Moffitt	Republican	1993	Chair: Fire Protection; Member: Access to Federal Funding; Agriculture & Conservation; Counties & Townships; Railroad Industry; State Government Administration; Veterans' Affairs
75	Grundy, Iroquois, Kankakee, La Salle, Will	Careen M. Gordon	Democratic	2003	Chair: Computer Technology; Member: Insurance; Judiciary I - Civil Law; Labor; Revenue & Finance
76	Bureau, La Salle, Putnam	Frank J. Mautino	Democratic	1991	Member: Appropriations-General Service; Insurance; Medicaid Reform Committee; Revenue & Finance; Special Investigative Committee; Tollway Oversight
77	Cook, DuPage	Angelo Saviano	Republican	1993	Member: Aging; Appropriations-Human Services; Appropriations-Public Safety; Business Occupational Licenses; Health & Healthcare Disparities; Health Care Licenses; Joint Committee on Pier; Public Utilities
78	Cook	Deborah L. Graham	Democratic	2003	Chair: Renewable Energy; Member: Electric Utility Oversight; Appropriations-Human Services; Appropriations-Public Safety; Consumer Protection; Labor; Personnel & Pensions; Transportation, Regulation, Roads and Bridges
78	Cook	Camille Y Lilly	Democratic	2010	
79	Iroquois, Kankakee, Will	Lisa M. Dugan	Democratic	2003	Chair: Homeland Security & Emergency Preparation; Member: Agriculture & Conservation; Elementary & Secondary Education; Health Care Availability Access; Medicaid Reform; Family & Children; State Government Administration; Veterans' Affairs
80	Cook, Will	Anthony DeLuca	Democratic	2009	Member: Business Occupational Licenses; Mass Transit; Tollway Oversight; Tourism & Conventions
80	Cook, Will	George Scully Jr.	Democratic	1997	
81	Cook, DuPage, Will	Renée Kosel	Republican	1997	Member: Health Care Licenses; Infrastructure; Joint Committee on Government Reform; Mass Transit; Medicaid Reform; Family & Children; Public Policy & Accountability
82	Will	Jim Durkin	Republican	1995	Member: Computer Technology; Elections & Campaign Reform; Electric Generation & Commerce; Environment & Energy; Financial Institutions; Labor; Public Utilities; Special Investigative Committee
83	Kane	Linda Chapa LaVia	Democratic	2003	Chair: Appropriations-Elementary & Secondary Education; Education Reform; Member: Adoption Reform; Electric Utility Oversight; Fire Protection; Infrastructure; Labor; Revenue & Finance; Veterans' Affairs
84	Kendall, Will	Tom Cross	Republican	1993	Member: Joint Committee on Government Reform
85	Will	Emily McAsey	Democratic	2009	Member: Aging; Appropriations-Elementary & Secondary Education; Judiciary I - Civil Law; Judiciary II - Criminal Law; State Government Administration; Veterans' Affairs
86	Will	Jack McGuire	Democratic	1991	Member: Access to Federal Funding; Aging; Railroad Industry; Tourism & Conventions; Transportation, Regulation, Roads and Bridges
87	Christian, De Witt, Logan, Macon, McLean, Sangamon, Tazewell	Bill Mitchell	Republican	1999	Member: Aging; Business Occupational Licenses; Counties & Townships; Financial Institutions; Fire Protection; Insurance
88	McLean	Dan Brady	Republican	2001	Chair: Workers' Compensation Reform; Member: Appropriations-Higher Education; Computer Technology; Elections & Campaign Reform; Executive; Insurance; Personnel & Pensions; Railroad Industry
89	Carroll, Jo Daviess, Ogle, Winnebago, Stephenson	Jim Sacia	Republican	2003	Member: Agriculture & Conservation; Appropriations-Public Safety; International Trade & Commerce; Judiciary II - Criminal Law; Juvenile Justice Reform; Prison Reform; Special Investigative Committee; Tourism & Conventions; Veterans' Affairs; Workers' Compensation Reform
90	Henry, Lee, Ogle, Whiteside	Jerry L. Mitchell	Republican	1995	Member: Appropriations-Elementary & Secondary Education; Elementary & Secondary Education; Public Policy & Accountability; Railroad Industry; Tourism & Conventions; Veterans' Affairs
91	Fulton, Peoria, Tazewell	Michael K. Smith	Democratic	1995	Chair: Elementary & Secondary Education; Member: Appropriations-Elementary & Secondary Education; Computer Technology; Environment & Energy; Financial Institutions; Fire Protection; Homeland Security & Emergency Preparation
92	Peoria	Jehan A. Gordon	Democratic	2009	Member: Access to Federal Funding; Appropriations-Elementary & Secondary Education; Appropriations-Human Services; Education Reform; Health & Healthcare Disparities; Infrastructure; Veterans' Affairs
93	Adams, Brown, Cass, Hancock, Pike, Schuyler, Scott	Jil Tracy	Republican	2006	Member: Aging; Appropriations-Higher Education; Consumer Protection; Environmental Health; Judiciary I - Civil Law; Juvenile Justice Reform; Special Investigative Committee; Transportation, Regulation, Roads and Bridges; Vehicles & Safety
94	Fulton, Hancock, Henderson, Mason, McDonough, Mercer, Warren	Norine Hammond	Republican	2010	Member: Agriculture & Conservation; Appropriations-Higher Education; Higher Education; Renewable Energy; State Government Administration
94	Fulton, Hancock, Henderson, Mason, McDonough, Mercer, Warren	Richard P. Myers	Republican	1995	
95	DuPage, Kane	Mike Fortner	Republican	2007	Member: Bio-Technology; Cities & Villages; Electric Generation & Commerce; Environment & Energy; Mass Transit; Youth & Family
96	DuPage, Kendall	Darlene J. Senger	Republican	2009	Member: Appropriations-Human Services; Education Reform; Elementary & Secondary Education; Financial Institutions; Homeland Security & Emergency Preparation; Insurance; International Trade & Commerce; Mass Transit; Medicaid Reform Committee; Tollway Oversight
97	Calhoun, Greene, Jersey, Macoupin, Morgan, Pike	Jim Watson	Republican	2001	Chair: Access to Federal Funding; Member: Elementary & Secondary Education; Environment & Energy; Financial Institutions; Insurance; Medicaid Reform; Family & Children; Veterans' Affairs
98	Christian, Fayette, Macoupin, Madison, Montgomery, Shelby	Betsy Hannig	Democratic	2009	Member: Rules
98	Christian, Fayette, Macoupin, Madison, Montgomery, Shelby	Gary Hannig	Democratic	1979	Member: Special Investigative Committee
99	Sangamon	Raymond Poe	Republican	1995	Member: Appropriations-Higher Education; Environment & Energy; Personnel & Pensions; Prison Reform; State Government Administration; Transportation, Regulation, Roads and Bridges
100	Logan, Menard, Sangamon	Rich Brauer	Republican	2003	Member: Access to Federal Funding; Appropriations-General Service; Appropriations-Higher Education; Personnel & Pensions; Tourism & Conventions; Transportation, Regulation, Roads and Bridges
101	Champaign, De Witt, Macon, McLean, Piatt	Robert F. Flider	Democratic	2003	Chair: Electric Generation & Commerce; Member: Agriculture & Conservation; Elementary & Secondary Education; Environment & Energy; Renewable Energy; Veterans' Affairs
102	Bond, Clinton, Effingham, Fayette, Madison, Shelby, St. Clair	Ron Stephens	Republican	1985	Member: Appropriations-Human Services; Cities & Villages; Environmental Health; Health & Healthcare Disparities; Insurance; Labor
103	Champaign	Naomi D. Jakobsson	Democratic	2003	Chair: Human Services; Member: Adoption Reform; Appropriations-Higher Education; Elections & Campaign Reform; Environmental Health; Higher Education; Medicaid Reform Committee; Public Policy & Accountability; Telecommunications
104	Champaign, Vermilion	William B. Black	Republican	1986	Chair: - Member: Rules; Appropriations-Higher Education; Financial Institutions; Investigative; Railroad Industry; Transportation, Regulation, Roads and Bridges Eeputy Minority Leader and ex officio member of all House committees.
104	Champaign, Vermilion	Chad D Hays	Republican	2010	Member: Appropriations-Higher Education; Financial Institutions; Railroad Industry; Transportation, Regulation, Roads and Bridges
105	Champaign, Ford, Iroquois, Livingston, McLean	Shane Cultra	Republican	2003	Member: Access to Federal Funding; Agriculture & Conservation; Electric Generation & Commerce; Labor; Railroad Industry; Renewable Energy
105	Champaign, Ford, Iroquois, Livingston, McLean	Russell Geisler; Sworn in January 9, 2011. Resigned January 10, 2011.	Republican	2011	
105	Champaign, Ford, Iroquois, Livingston, McLean	Jason Barickman; Sworn in January 10, 2011.	Republican	2011	
106	Livingston, Marshall, McLean, Tazewell, Woodford	Keith P. Sommer	Republican	1999	Member: Adoption Reform; Health Care Availability Access; International Trade & Commerce; Transportation, Regulation, Roads and Bridges
107	Bond, Clinton, Jefferson, Marion	John D. Cavaletto	Republican	2009	Member: Aging; Agriculture & Conservation; Appropriations-Higher Education; Elementary & Secondary Education; Fire Protection; Railroad Industry
108	Clay, Edwards, Effingham, Hamilton, Jasper, Richland, Wayne, White	David Reis	Republican	2005	Member: Agriculture & Conservation; Appropriations-Public Safety; Elections & Campaign Reform; Elementary & Secondary Education; Infrastructure; Juvenile Justice Reform; Renewable Energy; Workers' Compensation Reform
109	Clark, Crawford, Cumberland, Edgar, Effingham, Lawrence, Shelby, Wabash	Roger L. Eddy	Republican	2003	Chair: Education Reform; Member: Appropriations-Elementary & Secondary Education; Computer Technology; Elementary & Secondary Education; Infrastructure; Public Policy & Accountability; Revenue & Finance; Special Investigative Committee
110	Champaign, Coles, Douglas, Piatt	Chapin Rose	Republican	2003	Member: Appropriations-Higher Education; Environment & Energy; Environmental Health; Financial Institutions; Fire Protection; Insurance; Judiciary I - Civil Law; Medicaid Reform Committee; Special Investigative Committee
111	Jersey, Madison	Daniel V. Beiser	Democratic	2004	Chair: Transportation, Regulation, Roads and Bridges; Member: Aging; Appropriations-Higher Education; Business Occupational Licenses; Environment & Energy; Vehicles & Safety
112	Madison, St. Clair	Jay C. Hoffman	Democratic	1991	Member: Judiciary I - Civil Law; Labor; Railroad Industry; Transportation, Regulation, Roads and Bridges
113	St. Clair	Thomas Holbrook	Democratic	1995	Chair: Environment & Energy; Member: Business Occupational Licenses; Electric Generation & Commerce; Financial Institutions; Public Utilities; Railroad Industry; Renewable Energy; Transportation, Regulation, Roads and Bridges
114	St. Clair	Eddie Lee Jackson Sr.	Democratic	2009	Member: Appropriations-Elementary & Secondary Education; Appropriations-Human Services; Consumer Protection; Health Care Licenses
115	Clinton, Jackson, Perry, Washington	Mike Bost	Republican	1995	Member: Appropriations-Higher Education; Consumer Protection; Electric Utility Oversight; Higher Education; Public Utilities; Special Investigative Committee; State Government Administration; Telecommunications; Veterans' Affairs
116	Monroe, Perry, Randolph, St. Clair	Dan Reitz	Democratic	1997	Chair: Health Care Licenses; Member: Agriculture & Conservation; Counties & Townships; Electric Generation & Commerce; Environment & Energy; Financial Institutions; Railroad Industry; Telecommunications
117	Franklin, Hamilton, Williamson	John E. Bradley	Democratic	2003	Chair: Revenue & Finance; Workers' Compensation Reform; Member: Environment & Energy; Judiciary I - Civil Law; Tourism & Conventions; Transportation, Regulation, Roads and Bridges
118	Alexander, Gallatin, Hamilton, Hardin, Johnson, Massac, Pope, Pulaski, Saline, Union, White	Brandon W. Phelps	Democratic	2003	Chair: Agriculture & Conservation; Member: Electric Generation & Commerce; Environment & Energy; Health Care Licenses; Labor; Veterans' Affairs

== See also ==
- 111th United States Congress
- List of Illinois state legislatures

== Works cited ==
- Illinois Blue Book 2009–2010 (PDF). Illinois Secretary of State. 2009.
