= 95th Illinois General Assembly =

Illinois state legislative session from 2007 to 2008

←	94th	96th	→
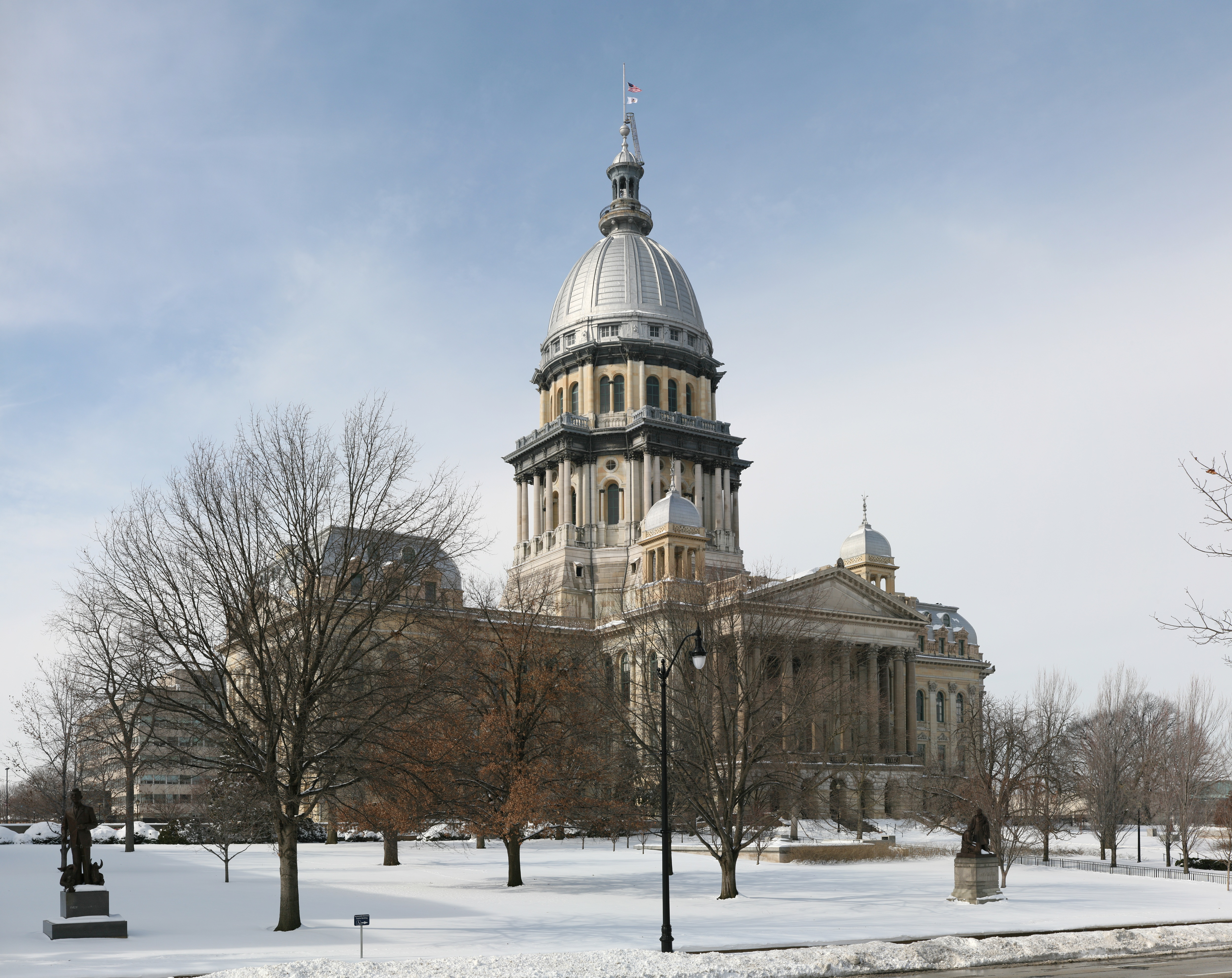
- The Illinois State Capitol in 2008

Overview
- Meeting place: Illinois State Capitol, Springfield
- Term: 2007 – 2009
- Election: November 7, 2006
- Website: Official site

Illinois Senate
- President: Emil Jones, Democrat

Illinois House of Representatives
- Speaker: Michael J. Madigan, Democrat

The 95th Illinois General Assembly, consisting of the Illinois Senate and the Illinois House of Representatives, existed from January 10, 2007 to January 13, 2009 during the final two years of Rod Blagojevich's governorship. The General Assembly met at Illinois State Capitol.

During the 95th General Assembly, the Illinois Senate was in session for 183 legislative days, and the Illinois House was in session for 302 legislative days. The governor called the General Assembly into special session 26 times, the most in Illinois history.

All 118 members of the House, and 38 of the 59 members of the Senate, were elected in the 2006 election. The apportionment of seats was based on the 2000 census. Both chambers had a Democratic majority.

The 95th General Assembly was succeeded by the 96th General Assembly in January 2009.

== Legislation ==
The 95th General Assembly enacted a total of 1,056 bills into law.

The General Assembly passed the Biometric Information Privacy Act (BIPA) unanimously in 2008. BIPA imposes strict requirements on companies that do business in Illinois and also collect or store biometric information. When it was enacted, BIPA was the first law in the United States regulating the use of biometric information. BIPA provides a private right of action for people who have been harmed by violations of the law. Governor Blagojevich signed BIPA into law on October 3, 2008.

The General Assembly also passed the Hospital Uninsured Patient Discount Act, which requires hospitals in Illinois to give most uninsured patients a discount on their medical bills. The Act also requires hospitals to include information on their bills about how to apply for the discount.

The General Assembly also passed the Smoke Free Illinois Act (410 ILCS 82), a comprehensive anti-smoking law. The Act bans smoking inside most buildings and vehicles used by the general public, used as a place of employment, or owned by the government or other public body. It also requires "no-smoking" signs, bans smoking within 15 feet (4.6 m) of openings in the targeted buildings and requires at least 75% of rooms in each hotel to be non-smoking. The governor signed the Act into law on July 23, 2007. The Act's passage was the product of a year-long campaign by the Illinois Coalition Against Tobacco. Illinois was the 19th state to adopt a smoking ban of this type.

== Impeachment ==
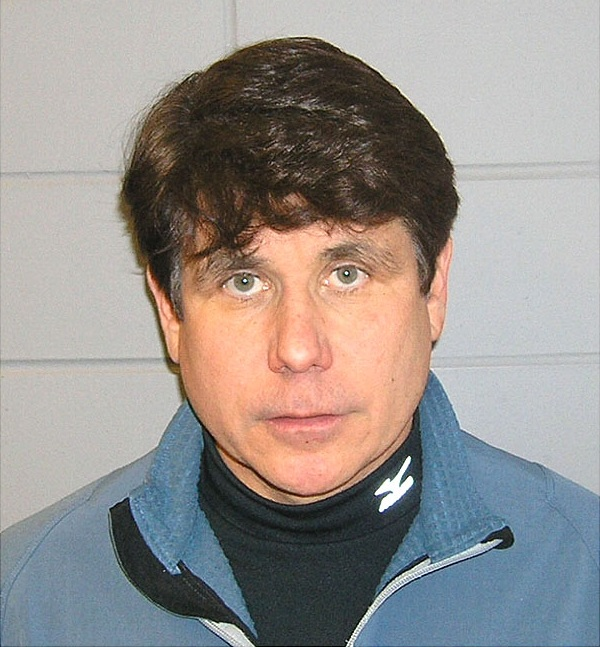
Mug shot of Governor Rod Blagojevich on December 9, 2008

Near the end of the 95th General Assembly, on December 9, 2008, Governor Rod Blagojevich was arrested by federal agents and charged with conspiracy and soliciting bribes. On December 15, six days after the scandal broke with no resignation by the Governor, the Illinois House voted unanimously 113–0 to begin impeachment proceedings. This was the first impeachment inquiry against a governor in Illinois history. On the same day, House Speaker Michael Madigan formed a bipartisan committee of inquiry within the House of Representatives.

Madigan stated "We have given the governor six days to resign." He also stated that the committee would work every day except Christmas Eve, Christmas Day, New Year's Eve, and New Year's Day until they had completed their report. House Majority Leader Barbara Flynn Currie chaired the Special Committee on Impeachment.

Madigan stated that the impeachment committee would consider the pending criminal charges as well as review other possible wrongdoing during Blagojevich's term such as abuse of power, taking action without legal authority, ignoring state laws, and defying lawful requests for information from the General Assembly. Currie further stated that among the controversial actions under review by the committee would be the Blagojevich administration's purchase of a flu vaccine that was never distributed and his unilateral decision to send a $1 million grant to a private school that was damaged when the historic Pilgrim Baptist Church was destroyed by fire. She also warned that the panel's interest in investigating alleged criminal activities surrounding Blagojevich might be affected by how much cooperation was forthcoming from federal investigators, which was supported by a formal written request to Prosecutor Fitzgerald. On December 30, Fitzgerald filed a motion to allow the impeachment committee to hear the conversations recorded by wiretap during his federal investigation.

On January 8, 2009, the 21-member bipartisan committee on impeachment voted unanimously to recommend that the House impeach the Governor. The following day, the full House voted 114–1 to impeach the governor. The lone dissenter was Chicago-area Representative Milton Patterson; three other representatives abstained. After the Illinois House impeached Blagojevich, the Illinois Senate held a trial at which Illinois Supreme Court Chief Justice Thomas R. Fitzgerald presided. Under the Illinois Constitution, the Chief Justice presides over the impeachment trial of a governor.

The article of impeachment alleged a pattern of conduct constituting abuse of power, including the events described in the criminal complaint and several instances of ignoring Illinois law in his use of executive power. In particular, it accused Blagojevich of engaging in a conduct constituting a pattern of abuse of power.

The impeachment proceedings continued in the 96th General Assembly. The Illinois Senate voted unanimously to remove Blagojevich from office on January 29, 2009.

== Senate ==
Under the 1970 Illinois Constitution, the Illinois Senate has 59 members, who serve overlapping two- and four-year terms. Thirty votes are required for a majority, and 36 votes (or 60%) are required to override a veto or approve a constitutional amendment.

Of the 38 members elected in the 2006 Illinois Senate election, 19 were elected to four-year terms, and 19 were elected to two-year terms.

=== Senate leadership ===
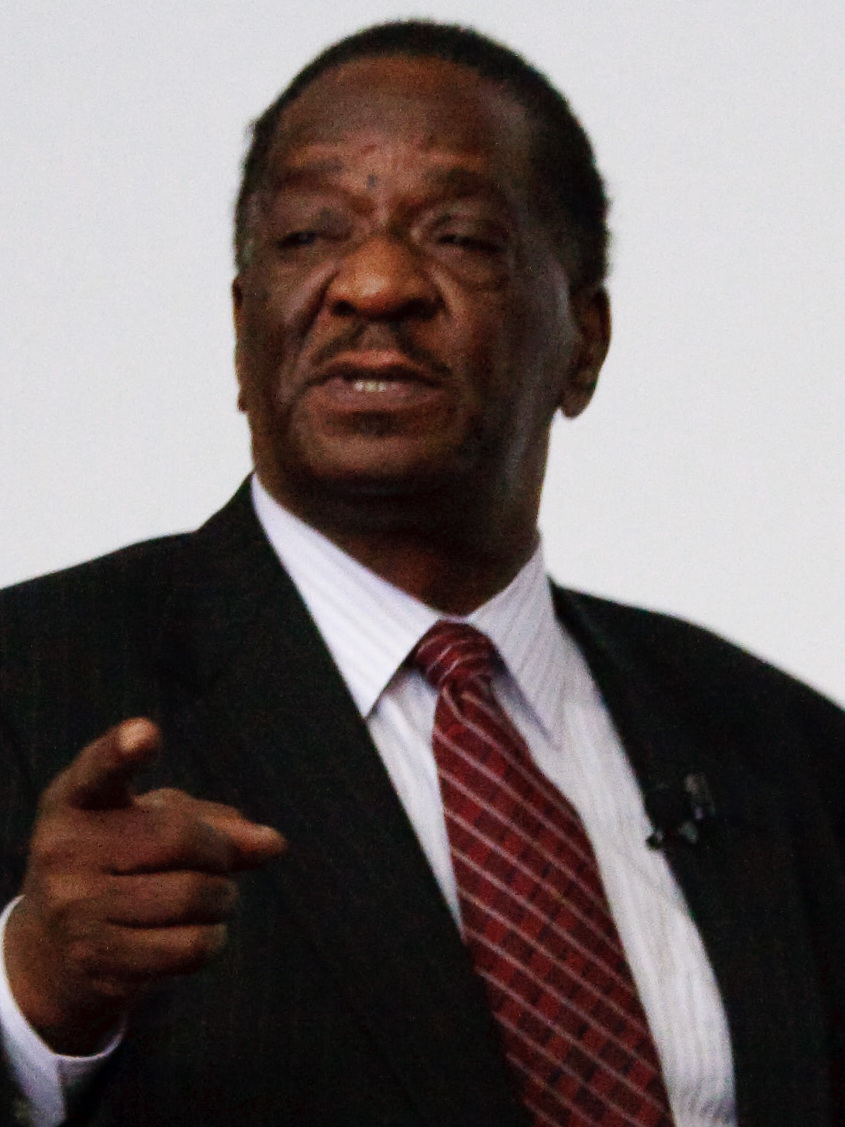
Emil Jones, president of the 95th Senate

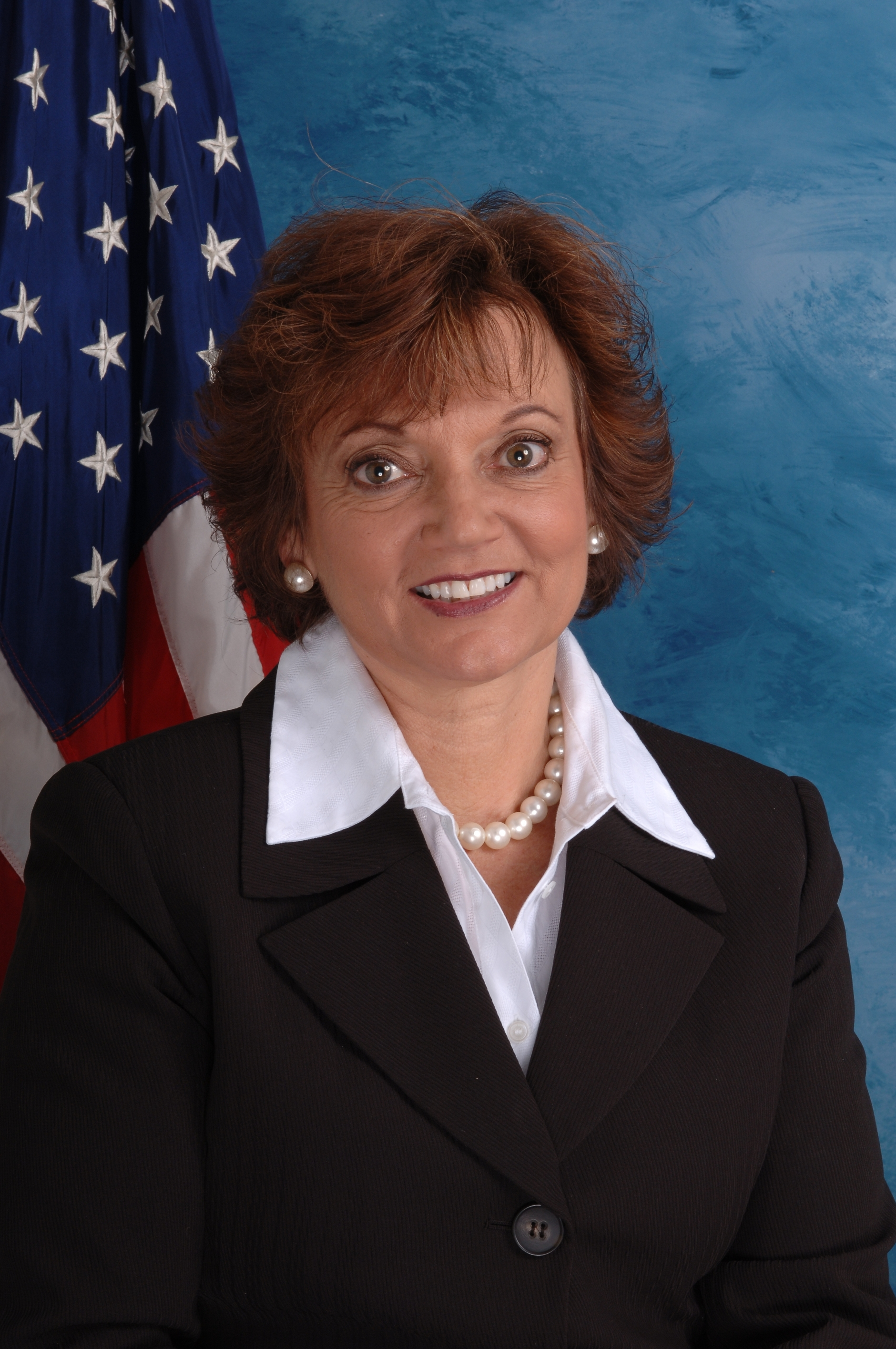
Majority Leader Debbie Halvorson

Minority Leader Frank Watson

Position	Name	Party	District
President of the Senate	Emil Jones	Democratic	14
Majority Leader	Debbie Halvorson	Democratic	57
Minority Leader	Frank Watson	Republican	51

=== Party composition ===
The Senate of the 95th General Assembly consisted of 37 Democrats and 22 Republicans.

Affiliation	Members
Democratic Party	37
Republican Party	22
Total	59

=== State senators ===
District	Counties represented	Senator	Party	First year	Committees
1	Cook	Antonio Munoz	Democratic	1999	Chair: Transportation; Member: Environment and Energy; Licensed Activities; Pensions and Investments
2	Cook	William Delgado	Democratic	2006	Chair: Licensed Activities; Member: Appropriations I; Human Services; Public Health
3	Cook	Mattie Hunter	Democratic	2003	Chair: Appropriations III; Member: Environment and Energy; Higher Education; Pensions and Investments; Public Health
4	Cook	Kimberly A. Lightford	Democratic	1998	Chair: Education; Member: Financial Institutions; Higher Education; Public Health; Revenue
5	Cook	Rickey R. Hendon	Democratic	1993	Chair: Executive Appointments; Rules; Member: Environment and Energy; Executive; Labor
6	Cook	John J. Cullerton	Democratic	1991	Chair: Judiciary Civil Law; Special Committee on Impeachment Procedure; Member: Insurance; Judiciary Criminal Law; Revenue
7	Cook	Carol Ronen	Democratic	1993	
7	Cook	Heather Steans	Democratic	2008	Member: Human Services; Insurance; Labor; Local Government
8	Cook	Ira I. Silverstein	Democratic	1999	Chair: Executive; Member: Commerce and Economic Development; Judiciary Civil Law; Judiciary Criminal Law; Licensed Activities; Special Committee on Impeachment Procedure
9	Cook	Jeffrey M. Schoenberg	Democratic	2003	Chair: Appropriations II; Member: Appropriations I; Appropriations III; Public Health; Revenue
10	Cook	James A. DeLeo	Democratic	1993	Member: Executive; Executive Appointments
11	Cook	Louis S. Viverito	Democratic	1995	Member: Executive; Executive Appointments; Higher Education; Rules
12	Cook	Martin A. Sandoval	Democratic	2003	Chair: Commerce and Economic Development; Member: Appropriations I; Environment and Energy; Local Government
13	Cook	Kwame Raoul	Democratic	2004	Chair: Pensions and Investments; Member: Commerce and Economic Development; Judiciary Criminal Law; Public Health
14	Cook	Emil Jones Jr.	Democratic	1973	Member: Executive
15	Cook	James T. Meeks	Democratic	2003	Chair: Human Services; Member: Appropriations I; Education; Housing and Community Affairs; State Government & Veterans Affairs
16	Cook	Jacqueline Y. Collins	Democratic	2003	Chair: Financial Institutions; Member: Appropriations I; Education; Housing and Community Affairs
17	Cook	Donne E. Trotter	Democratic	1993	Chair: Appropriations I Member: Appropriations II; Appropriations III; Environment and Energy; Executive Appointments
18	Cook	Edward D. Maloney	Democratic	2003	Chair: Higher Education; Member: Appropriations I; Appropriations III; Labor; Local Government
19	Cook, Will	M. Maggie Crotty	Democratic	2003	Chair: Local Government; Member: Higher Education; Housing and Community Affairs; Human Services; Licensed Activities
20	Cook	Iris Y. Martinez	Democratic	2003	Member: Education; Executive; Housing and Community Affairs; Pensions and Investments; Public Health
21	Cook, DuPage	Dan Cronin	Republican	1993	Member: Education; Judiciary Civil Law; Pensions and Investments
22	Cook, Kane	Michael Noland	Democratic	2007	Member: Appropriations III; Housing and Community Affairs; Judiciary Civil Law; Revenue
23	DuPage	Carole Pankau	Republican	2005	Member: Appropriations III; Environment and Energy; Labor; Public Health; Revenue
24	DuPage, Will	Kirk W. Dillard	Republican	1993	Chair: Judiciary Civil Law; Member: Environment and Energy; Executive Appointments; Judiciary Criminal Law; Licensed Activities; Special Committee on Impeachment Procedure
25	Kane, Kendall, La Salle	Chris Lauzen	Republican	1993	Member: Appropriations I; Appropriations II; Appropriations III; Labor; Revenue
26	Cook, Lake, McHenry	William E. Peterson	Republican	1983	Member: Executive; Housing and Community Affairs; Human Services; Insurance; Labor; Local Government
27	Cook, Lake	Matt Murphy	Republican	2007	Member: Appropriations I; Commerce and Economic Development; Higher Education; Judiciary Civil Law; Revenue; Special Committee on Impeachment Procedure
28	Cook, DuPage, Kane	John J. Millner	Republican	2005	Member: Education; Executive Appointments; Financial Institutions; Human Services; Judiciary Criminal Law
29	Cook, Lake	Susan Garrett	Democratic	2003	Chair: Public Health; Member: Appropriations I; Education; Human Services; State Government & Veterans Affairs
30	Cook, Lake	Terry Link	Democratic	1997	Member: Appropriations II; Financial Institutions; Local Government; Revenue; Rules
31	Lake	Michael Bond	Democratic	2007	Member: Appropriations II; Pensions and Investments; State Government & Veterans Affairs; Transportation
32	McHenry	Pamela J. Althoff	Republican	2003	Member: Appropriations I; Appropriations II; Appropriations III; Local Government; Transportation
33	Cook	Dan Kotowski	Democratic	2007	Member: Appropriations II; Financial Institutions; Human Services; State Government & Veterans Affairs
34	Winnebago	Dave Syverson	Republican	1993	Member: Appropriations I; Appropriations III; Human Services; Insurance; Transportation
35	Boone, De Kalb, Ogle, Winnebago	J. Bradley Burzynski	Republican	1993	Member: Education; Executive; Higher Education; Housing and Community Affairs; Pensions and Investments
36	Carroll, Henry, Mercer, Rock Island, Whiteside	Mike Jacobs	Democratic	2005	Chair: Housing and Community Affairs; Member: Appropriations III; Human Services; Insurance
37	Bureau, Henry, Knox, Marshall, Peoria, Stark, Woodford	Dale E. Risinger	Republican	2003	Member: Appropriations II; Environment and Energy; Financial Institutions; Local Government; Transportation
38	Bureau, Grundy, Iroquois, Kankakee, La Salle, Putnam, Will	Gary G. Dahl	Republican	2005	Member: Agriculture and Conservation; Commerce and Economic Development; Licensed Activities; Local Government; State Government & Veterans Affairs
39	Cook, DuPage	Don Harmon	Democratic	2003	Chair: Revenue; Member: Environment and Energy; Judiciary Civil Law; Judiciary Criminal Law; Special Committee on Impeachment Procedure
40	Cook, Iroquois, Kankakee, Will	Debbie DeFrancesco Halvorson	Democratic	1997	
40	Cook, Iroquois, Kankakee, Will	Toi W Hutchinson; Appointed January 5, 2009.	Democratic	2009	Member: N/A
41	Cook, DuPage, Will	Christine Radogno	Republican	1997	Member: Appropriations I; Appropriations II; Appropriations III; Executive; Human Services; Public Health; Rules
42	Kane, Kendall, Will	Linda Holmes	Democratic	2007	Member: Agriculture and Conservation; Appropriations II; Commerce and Economic Development; Labor
43	Will	A. J. Wilhelmi	Democratic	2005	Chair: Judiciary Criminal Law; Member: Agriculture and Conservation; Appropriations II; Education; Judiciary Civil Law
44	Christian, De Witt, Logan, Macon, McLean, Sangamon, Tazewell	Bill Brady	Republican	2002	Member: Insurance; Pensions and Investments; Public Health; Revenue
45	Carroll, Henry, Jo Daviess, Lee, Ogle, Stephenson, Whiteside, Winnebago	Todd Sieben	Republican	1987	
45	Carroll, Henry, Jo Daviess, Lee, Ogle, Stephenson, Whiteside, Winnebago	Tim Bivins	Republican	2008	Member: Agriculture and Conservation; Commerce and Economic Development; Licensed Activities; State Government & Veterans Affairs
46	Fulton, Peoria, Tazewell	David Koehler	Democratic	2006	Member: Appropriations II; Commerce and Economic Development; Local Government; Transportation
47	Adams, Brown, Cass, Fulton, Hancock, Henderson, Mason, McDonough, Mercer, Pike, Schuyler, Scott, Warren	John M. Sullivan	Democratic	2003	Chair: Agriculture and Conservation; Member: Appropriations III; Higher Education; Transportation
48	DuPage, Kane, Kendall	Randall M. Hultgren	Republican	2007	Member: Environment and Energy; Housing and Community Affairs; Insurance; Judiciary Civil Law; Labor
49	Calhoun, Christian, Fayette, Greene, Jersey, Macoupin, Madison, Montgomery, Morgan, Pike, Shelby	Deanna Demuzio	Democratic	2004	Chair: State Government & Veterans Affairs; Member: Agriculture and Conservation; Commerce and Economic Development; Education
50	Logan, Menard, Sangamon	Larry K. Bomke	Republican	1995	Member: Appropriations II; Financial Institutions; State Government & Veterans Affairs; Transportation
51	Bond, Champaign, Clinton, De Witt, Effingham, Fayette, Macon, Madison, McLean, Piatt, Shelby, St. Clair	Frank C. Watson	Republican	1983	Member: Executive
52	Champaign, Vermilion	Michael W. Frerichs	Democratic	2007	Member: Agriculture and Conservation; Appropriations III; Higher Education; Labor
53	Champaign, Ford, Iroquois, Livingston, Marshall, McLean, Tazewell, Woodford	Dan Rutherford	Republican	2003	Member: Environment and Energy; Financial Institutions; Housing and Community Affairs; Pensions and Investments; Special Committee on Impeachment Procedure
54	Bond, Clay, Clinton, Edwards, Effingham, Hamilton, Jasper, Jefferson, Marion, Richland, Wayne, White	John O. Jones	Republican	2003	Member: Agriculture and Conservation; Commerce and Economic Development; Judiciary Criminal Law; Licensed Activities; State Government & Veterans Affairs
55	Champaign, Clark, Coles, Crawford, Cumberland, Douglas, Edgar, Effingham, Lawrence, Piatt, Shelby, Wabash	Dale A. Righter	Republican	2003	Member: Executive; Executive Appointments; Higher Education; Judiciary Criminal Law; Public Health; Rules; Special Committee on Impeachment Procedure
56	Jersey, Madison, St. Clair	William R. Haine	Democratic	2002	Chair: Insurance; Member: Environment and Energy; Judiciary Civil Law; Judiciary Criminal Law; Licensed Activities; Special Committee on Impeachment Procedure
57	St. Clair	James F. Clayborne Jr.	Democratic	1995	Chair: Environment and Energy; Member: Executive; Executive Appointments; Insurance; Pensions and Investments; Special Committee on Impeachment Procedure
58	Clinton, Jackson, Monroe, Perry, Randolph, St. Clair, Washington	David Luechtefeld	Republican	1995	Member: Agriculture and Conservation; Education; Executive Appointments; Higher Education
59	Alexander, Franklin, Gallatin, Hamilton, Hardin, Johnson, Massac, Pope, Pulaski, Saline, Union, White, Williamson	Gary Forby	Democratic	2003	Chair: Labor; Member: Financial Institutions; Insurance; Transportation

== House ==
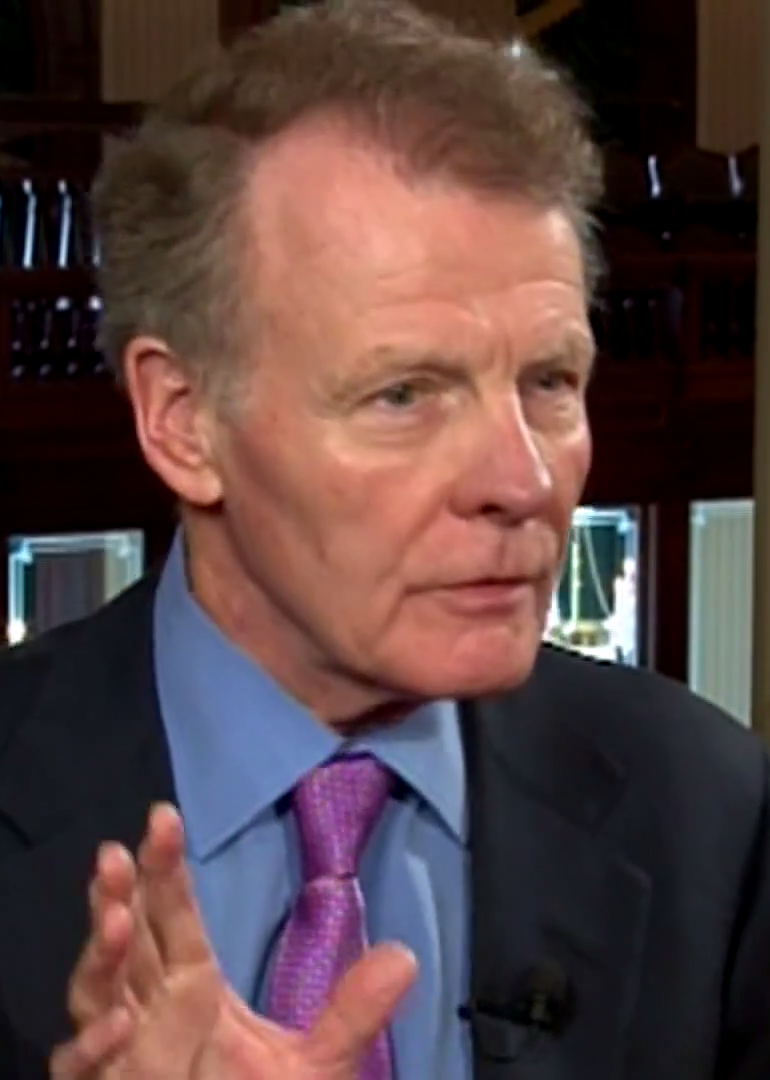
Michael Madigan, Speaker of the 95th House

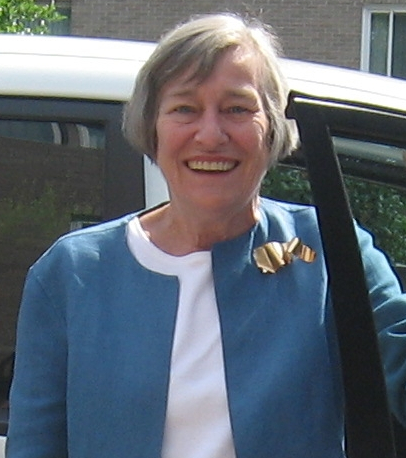
Majority Leader Barbara Flynn Currie

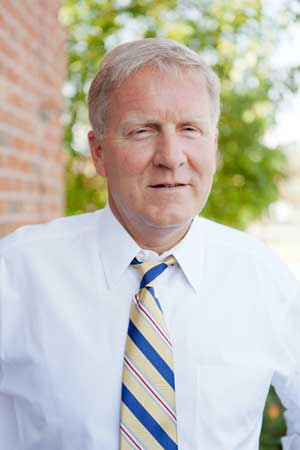
Minority Leader Tom Cross

The Illinois House has 118 members, who all serve two-year terms. Sixty votes are required for a majority, and 71 votes are required to override a veto or approve a constitutional amendment.

The members of the 95th House were elected in the 2006 election.

=== House leadership ===
Position	Name	Party	District
Speaker of the House	Michael J. Madigan	Democratic	22
Majority Leader	Barbara Flynn Currie	Democratic	25
Minority Leader	Tom Cross	Republican	84

=== Party composition ===
The 95th House consisted of 67 Democrats and 51 Republicans.

Affiliation	Members
Democratic Party	67
Republican Party	51
Total	118

=== State representatives ===
District	Counties represented	Representative	Party	First year	Committees
1	Cook	Susana A Mendoza	Democratic	2001	Chair: International Trade & Commerce; Member: Bio-Technology; Drivers Education & Safety; Health & Healthcare Disparities; Registration & Regulation; Renewable Energy
2	Cook	Edward J. Acevedo	Democratic	1997	Chair: Pension Funds Management; Member: Appropriations-Elementary & Secondary Education; Executive; Financial Institutions; Gaming; Registration & Regulation; Special Investigative Committee; Telecommunications
3	Cook	Luis Arroyo	Democratic	2007	Member: Appropriations-Elementary & Secondary Education; Consumer Protection; International Trade & Commerce; Labor; Mass Transit
4	Cook	Cynthia Soto	Democratic	2001	Chair: Appropriations-Elementary & Secondary Education; Member: Appropriations-Higher Education; Appropriations-Public Safety; Disparities in Educational Achievem; Labor; Mass Transit
5	Cook	Kenneth Dunkin	Democratic	2002	Chair: Tourism & Conventions; Member: Appropriations-Public Safety; Financial Institutions; Gaming; Homeland Security & Emergency Preparation; Insurance; Mass Transit; Telecommunications
6	Cook	Esther Golar	Democratic	2006	Member: Appropriations-Elementary & Secondary Education; Disability Services; Elementary & Secondary Education; Health Care Availability & Accessibility; Judiciary II - Criminal Law; Veterans Affairs
7	Cook	Karen A. Yarbrough	Democratic	2001	Chair: Appropriations-Public Safety; Member: Computer Technology; Elementary & Secondary Education; Financial Institutions; Gaming; Housing and Urban Development; Insurance; Renewable Energy; Tollway Oversight
8	Cook	LaShawn K. Ford	Democratic	2007	Member: Adoption Reform; Appropriations-Elementary & Secondary Education; Computer Technology; Disparities in Educational Achievem; Elections & Campaign Reform; Local Government; Pension Funds Management
9	Cook	Arthur L. Turner	Democratic	1981	Member: Executive; Prison Reform; Revenue; Rules; Special Investigative Committee
10	Cook	Annazette Collins	Democratic	2001	Chair: Juvenile Justice Reform; Public Utilities; Member: Adoption Reform; Appropriations-General Service; Human Services; Judiciary II - Criminal Law; State Government Administration
11	Cook	John A. Fritchey	Democratic	1996	Chair: Judiciary I - Civil Law; Member: Financial Institutions; Gaming; Registration & Regulation; Special Investigative Committee; Telecommunications; Transportation & Motor Vehicles
12	Cook	Sara Feigenholtz	Democratic	1995	Chair: Adoption Reform; Appropriations-Human Services; Member: Insurance; Juvenile Justice Reform; Mass Transit; Tourism & Conventions
13	Cook	Greg Harris	Democratic	2006	Member: Aging; Appropriations-Public Safety; Environmental Health; Health Care Availability & Accessibility; Homeland Security & Emergency Preparation; Tourism & Conventions
14	Cook	Harry Osterman	Democratic	2000	Chair: Labor; Member: Appropriations-Human Services; Elementary & Secondary Education; Financial Institutions; Homeland Security & Emergency Preparation; Mass Transit
15	Cook	John D'Amico	Democratic	2004	Chair: Drivers Education & Safety; Member: Aging; Elections & Campaign Reform; Higher Education; Labor; Transportation & Motor Vehicles
16	Cook	Lou Lang	Democratic	1987	Chair: Gaming; Member: Adoption Reform; Insurance; Judiciary I - Civil Law; Special Investigative Committee
17	Cook	Elizabeth Coulson	Republican	1997	Member: Appropriations-Elementary & Secondary Education; Appropriations-Human Services; Financial Institutions; Health & Healthcare Disparities; Human Services; Registration & Regulation
18	Cook	Julie Hamos	Democratic	1999	Chair: Mass Transit; Member: Environment & Energy; Environmental Health; Housing and Urban Development; Judiciary I - Civil Law; Least Cost Power Procurement; Prison Reform; Smart Growth & Regional Planning; Special Investigative Committee; Telecommunications
19	Cook	Joseph M. Lyons	Democratic	1996	Member: Aging; Executive; Financial Institutions; Telecommunications; Transportation & Motor Vehicles
20	Cook	Michael P. McAuliffe	Republican	1997	Chair: Veterans Affairs; Member: Appropriations-Public Safety; Drivers Education & Safety; Financial Institutions; Registration & Regulation; Telecommunications; Transportation & Motor Vehicles
21	Cook	Robert S. Molaro	Democratic	2003	Chair: Judiciary II - Criminal Law; Member: Appropriations-Public Safety; Executive; Gaming; Mass Transit; Tollway Oversight; Transportation & Motor Vehicles
21	Cook	Michael Zalewski	Democratic	2008	Member: N/A
22	Cook	Michael J. Madigan	Democratic	1971	
23	Cook	Daniel J. Burke	Democratic	1991	Chair: Executive; Member: Financial Institutions; Fire Protection; Personnel & Pensions; Registration & Regulation
24	Cook	Elizabeth Hernandez	Democratic	2007	Member: Appropriations-Elementary & Secondary Education; Consumer Protection; Disability Services; Health & Healthcare Disparities; Labor
25	Cook	Barbara Flynn Currie	Democratic	1979	Chair: Rules; Special Investigative Committee; Member: Revenue
26	Cook	Elga L. Jefferies	Democratic	2006	Member: Appropriations-Public Safety; Health & Healthcare Disparities; Judiciary II - Criminal Law; Prison Reform; Public Utilities; Registration & Regulation
27	Cook	Monique D. Davis	Democratic	1987	Chair: Appropriations-General Service; Member: Appropriations-Higher Education; Disparities in Educational Achievem; Elementary & Secondary Education; Financial Institutions; Gaming; Juvenile Justice Reform; Public Utilities; Special Investigative Committee; State Government Administration
28	Cook	Robert Rita	Democratic	2003	Chair: Tollway Oversight; Member: Consumer Protection; Environment & Energy; Executive; Health & Healthcare Disparities; Insurance
29	Cook	David E. Miller	Democratic	2001	Chair: Appropriations-Higher Education; Pension Funds Management; Member: Elementary & Secondary Education; Health & Healthcare Disparities; Higher Education; Mass Transit; Registration & Regulation; Transportation & Motor Vehicles
30	Cook	William Davis	Democratic	2003	Chair: Health & Healthcare Disparities; Member: Appropriations-Elementary & Secondary Education; Appropriations-Higher Education; Disparities in Educational Achievem; International Trade & Commerce; Labor; Railroad Safety
31	Cook	Mary E. Flowers	Democratic	1985	Chair: Health Care Availability & Accessibility; Member: DCFS Oversight; Drivers Education & Safety; Higher Education; Human Services; Smart Growth & Regional Planning; Special Investigative Committee
32	Cook	Milton Patterson	Democratic	2005	Member: Appropriations-Human Services; Appropriations-Public Safety; Computer Technology; Electric Utility Oversight
33	Cook	Marlow H. Colvin	Democratic	2001	Chair: Consumer Protection; Member: Appropriations-Public Safety; Insurance; Labor; Personnel & Pensions; Telecommunications
34	Cook	Constance A. Howard	Democratic	1995	Chair: Computer Technology; Member: Appropriations-Elementary & Secondary Education; Gaming; Health & Healthcare Disparities; Health Care Availability & Accessibility; Higher Education; Human Services; Judiciary II - Criminal Law; Juvenile Justice Reform; Labor; Special Investigative Committee
35	Cook	Kevin Joyce	Democratic	2003	Chair: Aging; Member: Appropriations-Higher Education; Bio-Technology; Elementary & Secondary Education; Environment & Energy; Railroad Safety; Registration & Regulation; Renewable Energy; Transportation & Motor Vehicles
36	Cook	James D. Brosnahan	Democratic	1997	Chair: Telecommunications; Member: Gaming; Higher Education; Judiciary I - Civil Law; Transportation & Motor Vehicles
37	Cook, Will	Kevin A. McCarthy	Democratic	1997	Chair: Higher Education; Member: Elections & Campaign Reform; Environmental Health; Gaming; Least Cost Power Procurement; Telecommunications; Tollway Oversight; Veterans Affairs
38	Cook	Robin Kelly	Democratic	2002	
38	Cook	Al Riley	Democratic	2007	Member: Appropriations-General Service; Appropriations-Human Services; Environmental Health; Human Services; Local Government; Mass Transit; Smart Growth & Regional Planning
39	Cook	Maria Antonia Berrios	Democratic	2003	Chair: Bio-Technology; Member: Executive; Insurance; International Trade & Commerce; Tourism & Conventions
40	Cook	Richard T. Bradley	Democratic	1997	Chair: Personnel & Pensions; Member: Environment & Energy; Executive; Financial Institutions; Gaming; Insurance; Registration & Regulation; Telecommunications
41	DuPage	Bob Biggins	Republican	1993	Member: Appropriations-General Service; Computer Technology; Executive; Public Utilities; Revenue; Tollway Oversight
42	Cook, DuPage	Sandra M. Pihos	Republican	2003	Member: Aging; Appropriations-Elementary & Secondary Education; Consumer Protection; Disability Services; Elementary & Secondary Education; Homeland Security & Emergency Preparation; Registration & Regulation; Tourism & Conventions
43	Cook, Kane	Ruth Munson	Republican	2002	Member: Appropriations-Human Services; Bio-Technology; Computer Technology; Elementary & Secondary Education; Insurance; International Trade & Commerce; Pension Funds Management; Tollway Oversight
44	Cook	Fred Crespo	Democratic	2007	Member: Disability Services; Elementary & Secondary Education; Health Care Availability & Accessibility; Mass Transit; Public Utilities
45	DuPage	Franco Coladipietro	Republican	2007	Member: Aging; International Trade & Commerce; Judiciary I - Civil Law; Least Cost Power Procurement; Prison Reform; Public Utilities; Registration & Regulation
46	DuPage	Dennis M. Reboletti	Republican	2007	Member: Environment & Energy; Judiciary II - Criminal Law; Juvenile Justice Reform; Mass Transit; Prison Reform; Tollway Oversight; Transportation & Motor Vehicles
47	DuPage	Patricia R. Bellock	Republican	1999	Member: Appropriations-Human Services; Disability Services; Environmental Health; Financial Institutions; Fire Protection; Human Services; Labor; Mass Transit; Special Investigative Committee
48	DuPage, Will	James H. Meyer	Republican	1993	Member: Consumer Protection; Environment & Energy; Executive; Health & Healthcare Disparities; Registration & Regulation; Smart Growth & Regional Planning; Telecommunications
49	Kane	Timothy L. Schmitz	Republican	1999	Member: Appropriations-Elementary & Secondary Education; Appropriations-Public Safety; Elections & Campaign Reform; Gaming; Homeland Security & Emergency Preparation; Human Services; Labor; Telecommunications
50	Kane, Kendall, La Salle	Patricia Reid Lindner	Republican	1993	Member: Adoption Reform; Computer Technology; Environmental Health; Gaming; Homeland Security & Emergency Preparation; Judiciary II - Criminal Law; Juvenile Justice Reform; Labor
51	Lake	Ed Sullivan Jr.	Republican	2003	Member: Appropriations-Public Safety; Consumer Protection; Mass Transit; Public Utilities; Registration & Regulation; Revenue
52	Cook, Lake, McHenry	Mark H. Beaubien Jr.	Republican	1996	Member: Appropriations-Public Safety; Gaming; Insurance; Labor; Pension Funds Management; Revenue
53	Cook, Lake	Sidney H. Mathias	Republican	1999	Member: Adoption Reform; Judiciary I - Civil Law; Local Government; Mass Transit; Railroad Safety; Smart Growth & Regional Planning; Telecommunications
54	Cook	Suzanne Bassi	Republican	1999	Member: Appropriations-Elementary & Secondary Education; Elementary & Secondary Education; Gaming; Mass Transit; Revenue; Special Investigative Committee; Tourism & Conventions
55	Cook, DuPage, Kane	Harry R. Ramey Jr.	Republican	2005	Member: Aging; Consumer Protection; Disability Services; Drivers Education & Safety; State Government Administration; Telecommunications; Transportation & Motor Vehicles
56	Cook, DuPage	Paul D. Froehlich	Democratic	2003	Chair: Disparities in Educational Achievem; Member: DCFS Oversight; Elementary & Secondary Education; Environmental Health; Mass Transit; Prison Reform; State Government Administration
57	Cook	Elaine Nekritz	Democratic	2003	Chair: Elections & Campaign Reform; Railroad Safety; Member: Appropriations-Higher Education; Environment & Energy; Environmental Health; Judiciary I - Civil Law; Renewable Energy
58	Lake	Karen May	Democratic	2001	Chair: Environmental Health; Member: Electric Utility Oversight; Environment & Energy; Health Care Availability & Accessibility; Pension Funds Management; Telecommunications
59	Cook, Lake	Kathleen A. Ryg	Democratic	2003	Chair: Disability Services; Member: Appropriations-Elementary & Secondary Education; Bio-Technology; Drivers Education & Safety; Local Government; Mass Transit
60	Lake	Eddie Washington	Democratic	2003	Chair: Housing and Urban Development; Prison Reform; Member: Appropriations-Human Services; Appropriations-Public Safety; Homeland Security & Emergency Preparation; Labor; Mass Transit
61	Lake	JoAnn D. Osmond	Republican	2003	Member: Appropriations-Public Safety; Health Care Availability & Accessibility; Insurance; Judiciary I - Civil Law; Telecommunications; Veterans Affairs
62	Lake	Sandy Cole	Republican	2007	Member: Adoption Reform; Appropriations-Elementary & Secondary Education; Bio-Technology; Environment & Energy; Human Services; Renewable Energy
63	McHenry	Jack D. Franks	Democratic	1999	Chair: State Government Administration; Member: Aging; International Trade & Commerce; Public Utilities; Special Investigative Committee
64	McHenry	Michael Tryon	Republican	2005	Member: Environment & Energy; Environmental Health; Health Care Availability & Accessibility; Least Cost Power Procurement; Local Government; Mass Transit; Smart Growth & Regional Planning
65	Cook	Rosemary Mulligan	Republican	1993	Member: Appropriations-Human Services; DCFS Oversight; Elementary & Secondary Education; Health & Healthcare Disparities; Health Care Availability & Accessibility; Registration & Regulation
66	Cook	Carolyn H. Krause	Republican	1993	Member: Electric Utility Oversight; Environment & Energy; Health Care Availability & Accessibility; Mass Transit; State Government Administration; Telecommunications
67	Winnebago	Charles E. Jefferson	Democratic	2001	Member: Aging; Gaming; Juvenile Justice Reform; Labor; Prison Reform; Public Utilities; Tollway Oversight
68	Winnebago	Dave Winters	Republican	1995	Member: Electric Utility Oversight; Environment & Energy; Environmental Health; Gaming; Labor; Renewable Energy; Telecommunications
69	Boone, De Kalb, Winnebago	Ronald A. Wait	Republican	1983	Member: Appropriations-Public Safety; Judiciary I - Civil Law; Judiciary II - Criminal Law; Renewable Energy; Transportation & Motor Vehicles
70	De Kalb, Ogle	Robert W. Pritchard	Republican	2003	Member: Appropriations-Higher Education; Elections & Campaign Reform; Elementary & Secondary Education; Environmental Health; Fire Protection; Higher Education; Renewable Energy; State Government Administration
71	Carroll, Henry, Rock Island, Whiteside	Mike Boland	Democratic	1995	Chair: Financial Institutions; Member: Drivers Education & Safety; Environmental Health; Labor; Renewable Energy; Rural Economic Development; Telecommunications
72	Mercer, Rock Island	Patrick J Verschoore	Democratic	2003	Chair: Ethanol Production Oversight; Member: Agriculture & Conservation; Appropriations-Human Services; Electric Utility Oversight; Environment & Energy; Gaming
73	Bureau, Marshall, Peoria, Woodford	David R. Leitch	Republican	1986	Member: Appropriations-Human Services; Disability Services; Electric Utility Oversight; Health & Healthcare Disparities; Housing and Urban Development; Tourism & Conventions
74	Bureau, Henry, Knox, Stark	Donald L. Moffitt	Republican	1993	Chair: Fire Protection; Member: Agriculture & Conservation; Homeland Security & Emergency Preparation; Railroad Safety; Veterans Affairs
75	Grundy, Iroquois, Kankakee, La Salle, Will	Careen M Gordon; Sworn in December 17, 2003.	Democratic	2003	Chair: Smart Growth & Regional Planning; Member: Consumer Protection; Judiciary I - Civil Law; Judiciary II - Criminal Law; Rural Economic Development; State Government Administration
76	Bureau, La Salle, Putnam	Frank J. Mautino	Democratic	1991	Chair: Insurance; Member: Appropriations-Public Safety; Local Government; Revenue; Special Investigative Committee
77	Cook, DuPage	Angelo Saviano	Republican	1993	Chair: Registration & Regulation; Member: Aging; Appropriations-Public Safety; Executive; Gaming; Health & Healthcare Disparities; Public Utilities
78	Cook	Deborah L. Graham	Democratic	2003	Chair: Renewable Energy; Member: Appropriations-Human Services; Appropriations-Public Safety; Consumer Protection; Housing and Urban Development; Juvenile Justice Reform; Labor; Pension Funds Management; Transportation & Motor Vehicles
79	Iroquois, Kankakee, Will	Lisa M. Dugan	Democratic	2003	Chair: Homeland Security & Emergency Preparation; Member: Agriculture & Conservation; Elementary & Secondary Education; Health Care Availability & Accessibility; Least Cost Power Procurement; State Government Administration; Veterans Affairs
80	Cook, Will	George Scully Jr.	Democratic	1997	Chair: Electric Utility Oversight; Member: Appropriations-Higher Education; Consumer Protection; Gaming
81	Cook, DuPage, Will	Renée Kosel	Republican	1997	Member: DCFS Oversight; Elementary & Secondary Education; Housing and Urban Development; International Trade & Commerce; Least Cost Power Procurement; Registration & Regulation; Transportation & Motor Vehicles
82	Will	Jim Durkin	Republican	1995	Member: Electric Utility Oversight; Environment & Energy; Financial Institutions; Gaming; Insurance; Judiciary II - Criminal Law; Mass Transit; Special Investigative Committee
83	Kane	Linda Chapa LaVia	Democratic	2003	Chair: Local Government; Member: Disability Services; Elementary & Secondary Education; Ethanol Production Oversight; Judiciary II - Criminal Law; Smart Growth & Regional Planning; Veterans Affairs
84	Kendall, Will	Tom Cross	Republican	1993	
85	Will	Brent Hassert	Republican	1993	Member: Environmental Health; Executive; Gaming; Labor; Mass Transit; Revenue; Rules
86	Will	Jack McGuire	Democratic	1991	Member: Aging; Drivers Education & Safety; Health Care Availability & Accessibility; Revenue; Tourism & Conventions
87	Christian, De Witt, Logan, Macon, McLean, Sangamon, Tazewell	Bill Mitchell	Republican	1999	Member: Drivers Education & Safety; Financial Institutions; Housing and Urban Development; Insurance; Rural Economic Development; Telecommunications
88	McLean	Dan Brady	Republican	2001	Member: Appropriations-Higher Education; Drivers Education & Safety; Elections & Campaign Reform; Executive; Higher Education; Homeland Security & Emergency Preparation; Insurance
89	Carroll, Jo Daviess, Ogle, Winnebago, Stephenson	Jim Sacia	Republican	2003	Member: Agriculture & Conservation; Appropriations-Public Safety; Judiciary II - Criminal Law; Juvenile Justice Reform; Labor; Prison Reform; Special Investigative Committee
90	Henry, Lee, Ogle, Whiteside	Jerry L. Mitchell	Republican	1995	Member: Aging; Appropriations-Elementary & Secondary Education; DCFS Oversight; Elementary & Secondary Education; Ethanol Production Oversight; Tourism & Conventions
91	Fulton, Peoria, Tazewell	Michael K. Smith	Democratic	1995	Chair: Elementary & Secondary Education; Member: Appropriations-Elementary & Secondary Education; Environment & Energy; Financial Institutions; Fire Protection; Homeland Security & Emergency Preparation; Telecommunications
92	Peoria	Aaron Schock	Republican	2005	Member: Appropriations-Elementary & Secondary Education; Appropriations-Human Services; Environment & Energy; Financial Institutions; Gaming; Veterans Affairs
92	Peoria	Joan G. Krupa; Appointed January 5, 2009.	Republican	2009	Member: N/A
93	Adams, Brown, Cass, Hancock, Pike, Schuyler, Scott	Jil Tracy	Republican	2006	Member: Aging; Consumer Protection; Higher Education; Juvenile Justice Reform; Local Government; Rural Economic Development; Special Investigative Committee; Transportation & Motor Vehicles
94	Fulton, Hancock, Henderson, Mason, McDonough, Mercer, Warren	Richard P. Myers	Republican	1995	Member: Agriculture & Conservation; Appropriations-Higher Education; Ethanol Production Oversight; Higher Education; State Government Administration
95	DuPage, Kane	Mike Fortner	Republican	2007	Member: Appropriations-Elementary & Secondary Education; Bio-Technology; Environment & Energy; Least Cost Power Procurement; Local Government; Mass Transit
96	DuPage, Kendall	Joe Dunn	Republican	2003	Member: Financial Institutions; Insurance; Judiciary I - Civil Law; Least Cost Power Procurement; Renewable Energy; Tollway Oversight
97	Calhoun, Greene, Jersey, Macoupin, Morgan, Pike	Jim Watson	Republican	2001	Member: Elementary & Secondary Education; Financial Institutions; Gaming; Public Utilities; State Government Administration; Telecommunications; Veterans Affairs
98	Christian, Fayette, Macoupin, Madison, Montgomery, Shelby	Gary Hannig	Democratic	1979	Member: Appropriations-General Service; Revenue; Rules; Special Investigative Committee
99	Sangamon	Raymond Poe	Republican	1995	Member: Appropriations-Higher Education; Housing and Urban Development; Personnel & Pensions; Prison Reform; Smart Growth & Regional Planning; State Government Administration
100	Logan, Menard, Sangamon	Rich Brauer	Republican	2003	Member: Appropriations-General Service; Appropriations-Higher Education; Drivers Education & Safety; Financial Institutions; Pension Funds Management; Personnel & Pensions; Registration & Regulation; Transportation & Motor Vehicles
101	Champaign, De Witt, Macon, McLean, Piatt	Robert F. Flider	Democratic	2003	Chair: Least Cost Power Procurement; Member: Agriculture & Conservation; DCFS Oversight; Elementary & Secondary Education; Environment & Energy; Ethanol Production Oversight; Local Government; Veterans Affairs
102	Bond, Clinton, Effingham, Fayette, Madison, Shelby, St. Clair	Ron Stephens	Republican	1985	Member: Appropriations-Public Safety; DCFS Oversight; Insurance; Prison Reform; Rural Economic Development
103	Champaign	Naomi D. Jakobsson	Democratic	2003	Chair: Human Services; Member: Adoption Reform; Appropriations-Elementary & Secondary Education; Appropriations-Higher Education; Higher Education
104	Champaign, Vermilion	William B. Black	Republican	1986	Member: Fire Protection; Higher Education; Railroad Safety; Rules; Special Investigative Committee; Transportation & Motor Vehicles
105	Champaign, Ford, Iroquois, Livingston, McLean	Shane Cultra	Republican	2003	Member: Agriculture & Conservation; Appropriations-General Service; DCFS Oversight; Labor; Railroad Safety; Rural Economic Development
106	Livingston, Marshall, McLean, Tazewell, Woodford	Keith P. Sommer	Republican	1999	Member: Adoption Reform; Health Care Availability & Accessibility; International Trade & Commerce; Local Government; Rural Economic Development
107	Bond, Clinton, Jefferson, Marion	Kurt M. Granberg	Democratic	1987	Member: Electric Utility Oversight; Gaming; Insurance; Rural Economic Development; Telecommunications
107	Bond, Clinton, Jefferson, Marion	Scott Wilzbach; Sworn in January 8, 2009.	Democratic	2009	Member: N/A
108	Clay, Edwards, Effingham, Hamilton, Jasper, Richland, Wayne, White	David Reis	Republican	2005	Member: Agriculture & Conservation; Elementary & Secondary Education; Ethanol Production Oversight; Judiciary II - Criminal Law; Labor; Renewable Energy
109	Clark, Crawford, Cumberland, Edgar, Effingham, Lawrence, Shelby, Wabash	Roger L. Eddy	Republican	2003	Member: Appropriations-Elementary & Secondary Education; Elementary & Secondary Education; Ethanol Production Oversight; Gaming; Higher Education; Labor; Pension Funds Management; Special Investigative Committee
110	Champaign, Coles, Douglas, Piatt	Chapin Rose	Republican	2003	Member: Appropriations-Higher Education; Environment & Energy; Financial Institutions; Gaming; Insurance; Judiciary I - Civil Law; Juvenile Justice Reform; Special Investigative Committee
111	Jersey, Madison	Daniel V. Beiser	Democratic	2004	Chair: DCFS Oversight; Member: Aging; Elections & Campaign Reform; Higher Education; Least Cost Power Procurement; Registration & Regulation; Transportation & Motor Vehicles
112	Madison, St. Clair	Jay C. Hoffman	Democratic	1991	Chair: Transportation & Motor Vehicles; Member: Judiciary I - Civil Law; Labor; Railroad Safety
113	St. Clair	Thomas Holbrook	Democratic	1995	Chair: Environment & Energy; Member: DCFS Oversight; Financial Institutions; Fire Protection; Public Utilities; Railroad Safety; Registration & Regulation; Revenue; Telecommunications
114	St. Clair	Eddie Lee Jackson Sr.	Democratic	2009	
114	St. Clair	Wyvetter H. Younge	Democratic	1975	Member: Appropriations-Elementary & Secondary Education; Gaming; Housing and Urban Development; Least Cost Power Procurement; Renewable Energy
115	Clinton, Jackson, Perry, Washington	Mike Bost	Republican	1995	Member: Elections & Campaign Reform; Higher Education; Public Utilities; Registration & Regulation; Special Investigative Committee; Telecommunications; Veterans Affairs
116	Monroe, Perry, Randolph, St. Clair	Dan Reitz	Democratic	1997	Chair: Agriculture & Conservation; Member: Environment & Energy; Ethanol Production Oversight; Registration & Regulation; Rural Economic Development
117	Franklin, Hamilton, Williamson	John E. Bradley	Democratic	2003	Chair: Revenue; Member: Environment & Energy; Insurance; Judiciary I - Civil Law; Rural Economic Development; State Government Administration
118	Alexander, Gallatin, Hamilton, Hardin, Johnson, Massac, Pope, Pulaski, Saline, Union, White	Brandon W. Phelps	Democratic	2003	Chair: Rural Economic Development; Member: Agriculture & Conservation; DCFS Oversight; Elementary & Secondary Education; Environment & Energy; Ethanol Production Oversight; Least Cost Power Procurement; Registration & Regulation; Veterans Affairs

== See also ==
- 110th United States Congress
- List of Illinois state legislatures
