= Wendell Jones =

Wendell Jones may refer to:

- Wendell E. Jones (1937–2011), American educator, businessman, and politician
- Wendell P. Jones (1866–1944), Canadian politician
