= Respiratory Health Association =

US nonprofit organization

Respiratory Health Association is a nonprofit organization located on Chicago's Near West Side.

Initially founded as the Chicago Tuberculosis Institute, the organization has undergone several name changes since 1906 to incorporate its expanding mission. Today, the association fights lung disease and promotes healthy lungs through research, advocacy and educational efforts on behalf of individuals and families affected by lung cancer, asthma, chronic obstructive pulmonary disease (COPD) and other lung diseases.

The organization serves people living with lung disease through community-based interventions, including assisting with grants for research, creating policy initiatives that address long-term concerns on respiratory diseases, and developing programs to prevent lung disease.

== History ==
1906 Chicago Tuberculosis Institute was founded "to advance the study, diagnosis, treatment, and prevention of tuberculosis (TB) and to coordinate the care of those afflicted with this disease."

1956 Following a decline in TB deaths, National Tuberculosis Association voted to include other respiratory diseases its mission.

1964 The landmark Surgeon General's Report announced, "Cigarette smoking... is the single most avoidable cause of disease in our society and the most important public health issue of our time."

1972 The TB Institute of Chicago and Cook County changed its name to Chicago Lung Association. National TB and Respiratory Disease Association formally changed its name to American Lung Association.

1988 Chicago Lung Association organized a grassroots lobbying campaign to pass Chicago's first clean indoor air ordinance (34-8) restricting smoking in restaurants, workplaces and public spaces.

1993 Chicago Lung Association is renamed American Lung Association of Metropolitan Chicago (ALAMC).

1998 The State of Illinois expects to receive $9 billion over a 25-year period as part of a national settlement with tobacco companies. ALAMC hosts the first annual Hustle up the Hancock stairclimb up the John Hancock Center to raise funds for its mission; ALAMC administers 14,000 flu shots throughout metropolitan Chicago.

2005 The organization plays a key role in passing Chicago's 100% smoke-free ordinance, which eliminates or phases out smoking in all Chicago workplaces, including bars and restaurants.

2007 Illinois becomes the 22nd state in the nation to become 100% smoke-free in its workplaces. Smoke Free Illinois Act is passed through the work of the ALAMC and other health groups.

2007 The organization ends its affiliation with American Lung Association and becomes an independent lung health organization. At that time, the organization changes its name to Respiratory Health Association of Metropolitan Chicago.

2008 RHAMC and the Illinois COPD Coalition release the Illinois State COPD Plan. As only the second of its kind in the nation, the plan outlines a state strategy to educate the public and better treat chronic obstructive pulmonary disease (COPD).

2009 Working with policy leaders in Springfield, Respiratory Health Association secures the inclusion of questions about COPD on the CDC's Behavioral Risk Factor Surveillance System, the state's health survey. The survey gathers critical information about COPD in Illinois, and it provides lawmakers, researchers and public health professionals a more accurate portrayal of the disease, its impacts and how to address it.

2010 In March, the Centers for Disease Control and Prevention awarded Chicago $11.5 million as part of Communities Putting Prevention to Work – Chicago Tobacco Prevention Project. Respiratory Health Association oversees the project in collaboration with the Chicago Department of Public Health. The project aims to reduce the adult and youth smoking rates and exposure to secondhand smoke across the city.

2010 In July, the U.S. Environmental Protection Agency (EPA) presents Respiratory Health Association with a leadership award for ongoing efforts to clean up diesel exhaust. The association and the Illinois EPA implemented more than 100 successful clean diesel projects throughout the state, and the association enacted idling reduction ordinances as well as secured more than $31.1 million in funding for diesel reduction projects in Chicago through the federal Congestion Mitigation and Air Improvement program in 2010 and 2011.

2010 Metra conducts testing and finds high levels of lung- and heart-damaging diesel soot inside its stainless-steel cars. They take action to reduce the pollution in response to a 2010 investigative piece by Chicago Tribune reporter Michael Hawthorne and RHAMC about poor air quality inside Metra trains and stations. RHAMC President and CEO Joel Africk participated in a press conference with Senator Richard J. Durbin urging Metra, U.S. EPA and OSHA to look into the matter.

2011 In April, Chicago City Council passes the city's first-ever clean diesel construction ordinance with strong support from the association. Sponsored by Mayor Richard M. Daley, the ordinance requires the use of cleaner diesel fuel and less-polluting diesel trucks and equipment on city-funded construction projects.

2012 In February, Midwest Generation announces plans to close its two coal-fired power plants on Chicago's Southwest Side. The plants were the single largest sources of air pollution in Chicago and were responsible for 42 deaths, 66 heart attacks and 720 asthma attacks annually. After more than a decade of work by RHAMC, the Clean Power Coalition and numerous other environmental and local groups, Mayor Emanuel and the city reached a deal to close the Fisk plant in Pilsen by the end of 2012, and the Crawford plant in Little Village by the end of 2014. Both plants closed in September 2012.

2013 To better reflect the organization's growing reach to locales outside the Chicago metropolitan area, the association officially becomes Respiratory Health Association.

== Mission ==
Respiratory Health Association's mission is to promote healthy lungs and fight lung disease through research, advocacy and education. Some key goals include:

- Improving treatments and cures for lung disease.
- Reducing tobacco use and exposure to second hand smoke.
- Reversing the asthma epidemic in Chicago.
- Advocating for cleaner air.

== Events ==
Respiratory Health Association's marquee event is Hustle Chicago, a race up 94 floors of the building formerly known as the John Hancock Center in Chicago to raise more than $1 million for respiratory disease research and programs.

Other events include:

- State Advocacy Day
- United For Lung Health Advocacy Day
- CowaLUNGA Bike Tour
- Hike for Lung Health
- Living Better Together COPD Conference
- CHILL
