= Jason Barickman =

American politician

Member of the Illinois Senate from the 53rd district
- In office January 9, 2013 – January 11, 2023
- Preceded by: Shane Cultra
- Succeeded by: Thomas M. Bennett

Member of the Illinois House of Representatives from the 105th district
- In office January 10, 2011 – January 9, 2013
- Preceded by: Russell Geisler
- Succeeded by: Dan Brady (redistricted)

Personal details
- Born: May 1, 1975 (age 51) Streator, Illinois
- Party: Republican
- Spouse: Kristin Barickman
- Children: 3
- Education: Illinois State University (B.A.); University of Illinois (J.D.)
- Profession: Attorney

Jason Barickman (born May 1, 1975), is a Republican former member of the Illinois Senate, who represented the 53rd district from January 2013 until January 2023. Before being elected to the Illinois Senate, he served in the Illinois House of Representatives, representing the 105th district from 2011 to 2013.

== Early life ==
Barickman was born May 1, 1975, in Streator, Illinois. Barickman was raised on his family farm in rural Livingston County. He graduated from Woodland High School before going on to Illinois State University, where he served as the student body president, and the University of Illinois College of Law. Following his graduation from law school, he became the Chair of the Champaign County Republican Central Committee. Barickman, a veteran, served in the Illinois Army National Guard as an infantry soldier. He is a principal at the Meyer Capel law firm. Barickman lives in Bloomington with his wife and three children.

As the Chairman of the Champaign County Republican Party, he supported the presidential campaign of former New York City Mayor Rudy Giuliani during the 2008 Republican Party presidential primaries.

== Illinois House of Representatives ==
Following the election of former State Senator Dan Rutherford as Illinois State Treasurer, then State Rep. Shane Cultra was selected to fill out Rutherford's remaining term in the Illinois State Senate. As vacancies in the Illinois General Assembly are filled by a weighted vote of county party chairman of the outgoing legislator's political party, Barickman voluntarily relinquished his vote for both the Illinois Senate and Illinois House seats, to avoid any perceived conflict of interest. Barickman was chosen by the legislative committee to serve a two-year term in the 97th General Assembly as a State Representative from the 105th House District in Illinois, a district that comprised parts of Livingston, Iroquois, Ford, McLean, Vermilion and Champaign counties. Cultra resigned from the Illinois House effective midnight January 9, 2011, and was succeeded by his longtime legislative aide Russell Geisler for a single day. On January 10, 2011, Barickman was sworn in to succeed Geisler.

== Illinois State Senate ==
During the 2011 decennial redistricting, the 53rd district was redrawn to include portions of Bloomington and Normal while losing Tazewell County. In the 2012 Republican primary, Barickman opted to run for the Illinois Senate against Shane Cultra. Barickman defeated Cultra with 19,713 votes to Cultra's 11,861 votes. Barickman won the general election.

On February 14, 2013, Barickman was the lone Republican senator to vote in favor of the Religious Freedom and Marriage Fairness Act which legalized same-sex marriage in Illinois. During the 2014 regular legislative session, Barickman, as co-chair of the Legislative Audit Commission, was heavily involved in the audit of former Governor Pat Quinn's controversial Neighborhood Recovery Initiative (NRI), a program which was hastily implemented by Quinn in the weeks leading up to the election, and was described by many as a wasteful disaster. NRI spent more than $50 million in taxpayer funding in grants to agencies in Chicago. This was followed by multiple criminal investigations and an additional state audit. Barickman has continued to work with members of both political parties to address the shortcomings in Illinois grant law to prevent future disasters similar to NRI.

On September 18, 2016, following Deputy Minority Leader Matt Murphy's (R-Palatine) resignation from the Illinois Senate, Republican Minority Leader Christine Radogno (R-Lemont) appointed Barickman to serve as Republican Minority Whip for the Republican Senate Caucus, then after the next recent election, Senator Barickman was promoted to one of four Assistant Republican Leadership positions. When the 102nd General Assembly convened in January 2021, Barickman was elevated to Caucus Chair and is now also serving as the Caucus Floor Leader.

Senator Barickman was heavily involved in the process of reforming Illinois' outdated formula for distributing school funding. He was the first to file legislation establishing an Evidence Based Model (EBM). Through his advocacy, the EBM concept was eventually embraced by lawmakers from both parties and the Governor, and was the basis for a new funding system signed into law in 2017.

He currently serves on the following committees: Executive (Minority Spokesperson); Redistricting (Minority Spokesperson); Energy and Public Utilities; Judiciary; Labor; Judiciary- Business Entities; Judiciary- Privacy; Redistricting- Chicago South (Sub-Minority Spokesperson); Redistricting- E Central & SE IL (Sub-Minority Spokesperson); Executive- Elections; Executive- Cannabis.

In the 2022 general election, Barickman was elected to the 103rd General Assembly. On December 5, 2022, Barickman announced that he would resign effective at the end of the 102nd General Assembly. His successor for the 103rd General Assembly will be chosen by local Republican leaders. State Representative Thomas M. Bennett was appointed to the vacancy.
