= Marcus C. Evans Jr. =

American politician

Marcus Evans
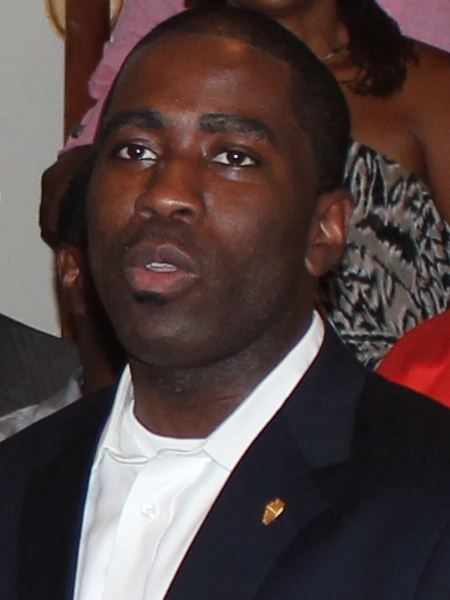

Member of the Illinois House of Representatives from the 33rd district
- Incumbent
- Assumed office April 13, 2012
- Preceded by: Marlow Colvin

Personal details
- Born: February 13, 1985 (age 41) Chicago, Illinois, U.S.
- Party: Democratic
- Education: Chicago State University (BA)

Marcus C. Evans Jr. is an American politician currently serving as Illinois state representative for the 33rd district. The 33rd district, located in the Chicago metropolitan area, includes parts of South Shore, South Chicago, South Deering, East Side, and Hegewisch in Chicago as well as parts of suburban Calumet City and Lansing. Evans was elected vice president of the National Conference of State Legislatures in 2023 and assumed the presidency of the organization in 2025.

== Early life and career ==
Evans was born February 13, 1985. He Evans earned a Bachelor of Arts in mathematics from Chicago State University. He served as deputy chief of staff to Alderman Michelle Harris. Evans is also a cancer survivor.

== Illinois House of Representatives ==
Marlow H. Colvin resigned from the Illinois House of Representatives effective April 12, 2012. Local Democratic leaders appointed Evans to the vacancy. Evans took office April 13, 2012. On December 5, 2012, Evans was appointed to the Illinois Sentencing Policy Advisory Council which oversees the Adult Redeploy Illinois program which works with local jurisdictions to increase community-based alternatives to incarceration for non-violent offenders. On March 16, 2015, Evans was appointed to the State Housing Task Force which works to ensure that the Annual Comprehensive Housing Plan as adopted coordinates all housing policies within state agencies. Evans is also one of four legislators to serve as an Illinois High School Association Liaison Representative.

He is a member of the Illinois House Legislative Black Caucus.

On February 23, 2021, Evans sponsored a bill that would ban the sale of games like Grand Theft Auto V. Earlier in the year, Evans introduced the bill following a series of carjackings at gas stations and convenience stores Though the bill did not mention Grand Theft Auto by name, it was interpreted online to be a ban on that game. The bill was covered in a number of gaming-related magazines including PC Gamer.

As of July 3, 2022, Representative Evans is a member of the following Illinois House committees:

- Appropriations - Human Services (HAPH)
- (Chairman) Business & Innovation Subcommittee (HLBR-BUIN)
- Ethics & Elections Committee (SHEE)
- Executive Committee (HEXC)
- Health Care Availability & Access Committee (HHCA)
- (Chairman of) Income Tax Subcommittee (HREF-INTX)
- (Chairman of) Labor & Commerce Committee (HLBR)
- Medicaid & Managed Care Subcommittee (HAPH-MEDI)
- (Chairman of) Minority Impact Analysis Subcommittee (HLBR-MIAS)
- Revenue & Finance Committee (HREF)
- (Chairman of) Wage Policy & Study Subcommittee (HLBR-WAGE)
- Workforce Development Subcommittee (HLBR-WORK)

== Electoral history ==
Illinois 33rd State House District General Election, 2012
Party	Candidate	Votes	%
Democratic	Marcus C. Evans, Jr. (incumbent)	40,150	100.0
Total votes		40,150	100.0

Illinois 33rd State House District General Election, 2014
Party	Candidate	Votes	%
Democratic	Marcus C. Evans, Jr. (incumbent)	28,090	100.0
Total votes		28,090	100.0

Illinois 33rd State House District General Election, 2016
Party	Candidate	Votes	%
Democratic	Marcus C. Evans, Jr. (incumbent)	40,046	100.0
Total votes		40,046	100.0

Illinois 33rd State House District General Election, 2018
Party	Candidate	Votes	%
Democratic	Marcus C. Evans, Jr. (incumbent)	32,916	100.0
Total votes		32,916	100.0

Illinois 33rd State House District General Election, 2020
Party	Candidate	Votes	%
Democratic	Marcus C. Evans, Jr. (incumbent)	39,641	100.0
Total votes		39,641	100.0
