= Smoke Free Illinois Act =

Illinois law that bans smoking in almost all public buildings

The Smoke-Free Illinois Act (410 ILCS 82; Public Act 095-0017) is a comprehensive anti-smoking law that took effect in Illinois on January 1, 2008. It bans smoking inside most buildings and vehicles used by the general public, used as a place of employment, or owned by the government or another public body. It also requires "no smoking" signs, bans smoking within 15 feet (4.6 m) of openings in the targeted buildings, and requires at least 75% of rooms in each hotel to be non-smoking. The act replaced the previous Illinois Clean Indoor Air Act (410 ILCS 80).

On July 31, 2023, an amendment to the law was passed to update its provisions for e-cigarettes. This amendment took effect on January 1, 2024.

== Motivation behind the Smoke-Free Illinois Act ==
The Illinois General Assembly found tobacco smoke to be a dangerous carcinogen to human beings and a hazard to public health. The Illinois General Assembly also found secondhand tobacco smoke to cause an estimated 2,900 deaths of Illinois citizens each year, an increased risk of premature death in Illinois workers exposed to secondhand tobacco smoke, and cause the following in children and adults; Heart disease, stroke, cancer, sudden infant death syndrome, low-birth-weight in infants, asthma and exacerbation of asthma, bronchitis and pneumonia.

== Enactment ==
On January 11, 2007, Illinois State Senator John J. Cullerton introduced comprehensive legislation that would make Illinois workplaces and indoor public places smoke-free. Similar legislation was also introduced in the Illinois House of Representatives as House Bill 246 by State Representative Karen Yarbrough. The American Lung Association and the American Cancer Society of Illinois joined more than 450 other organizations in applauding Senator Cullerton and Representative Yarbrough for this step.

The 95th Illinois General Assembly put the Smoke-Free Illinois Act into effect beginning January 1, 2008. The Director of the Illinois Department of Public Health, Damon T. Arnold, M.D., M.P.H., released a statement saying "The Smoke-free Illinois Website is designed to provide a variety of informational resources. I encourage you to read the information contained here to become more informed about the Smoke-free Illinois law, to access information about secondhand smoke, to seek assistance to quit smoking or to lodge a complaint about a possible violation."

== Locations ==
The Smoke-Free Illinois Act requires that public places and places of employment must be completely smoke-free inside and within 15 feet from entrances, exits, windows that open and ventilation intakes. This includes but is not limited to:

- Public places and buildings, offices, elevators, restrooms, theaters, museums, libraries, educational institutions, schools, commercial establishments, enclosed shopping centers and retail stores
- Restaurants, bars, taverns and gaming facilities
- Lobbies, reception areas, hallways, meeting rooms, waiting rooms, break rooms and other common-use areas
- Concert halls, auditoriums, enclosed or partially enclosed sports arenas, bowling alleys, ice and roller skating rinks, convention facilities, polling places and private clubs
- Hospitals, health care facilities, health care clinics, and child care, adult care or other similar social service care
- No less than 75% of hotel or motel sleeping quarters rented to guests
- Public conveyances, government-owned vehicles and vehicles open to the public

The Smoke-Free Illinois Act also provides the following exceptions:

- A private residence, as long as it is not used as a home-based business open to the public (e.g., child care, healthcare facility, adult daycare)
- Retail tobacco stores whose sales from tobacco are greater than 80% of total revenue and do not have a liquor, restaurant, or food license
- Nursing homes or long-term care facilities, both private and semi-private, where all of the occupants smoke and have requested to be in a smoking room
- Hotel or motel rooms, up to 25% of capacity, as long as the rooms are on the same floor and the smoke does not get into the non-smoking rooms

== Enforcement ==
The Smoke-Free Illinois Act (Senate Bill 500, P.A. 95-0017), and codified as 410 ILCS 82 took effect January 1, 2008. It repeals the Illinois Clean Indoor Air Act (410 ILCS 80) and it amends the State Mandates Act (30 ILCS 805) by adding Section 8.31. Enforcement, fines, and proprietor responsibilities are outlined per the Illinois Municipal League Newsletter dated December 13, 2007.

Enforcement

The Illinois Department of Public Health, local public health departments, and local law enforcement agencies are required to enforce the act. These agencies may assess fines to any corporation, partnership, association or other entity violating the no smoking provisions of the act. Each day that a violation occurs is a separate violation. (410 ILCS 82/40)

Fines

A person who smokes in a prohibited area shall be fined from $100 to $250. A person who owns, operates, or otherwise controls a public place or place of employment that violates the act shall be fined not less than $250 for the first violation, not less than $500 for the second violation within one year after the first violation, and not less than $2,500 for each additional violation within one year after the first violation. (410 ILCS 82/45)

In August 2018, the Public Act 100-0877 made amendments to the Smoke-Free Illinois Act which replaced the references of “fines” with the words “civil penalties”. This was done to clarify that law enforcement agencies, including the Illinois State Police and the Department of Natural Resources, may issue citations and enforce the Act, as well as make related changes to complaint and hearing procedures.

Proprietor responsibilities

Post a "no smoking" sign at each entrance. Do not permit smoking in a public place, a place of employment or within 15 feet of any entrance. Remove ashtrays from all areas where smoking is prohibited. (410 ILCS 82/20)

== Working with violators ==
Rather than an immediate fine for violating the smoking ban, several county health departments opted to work with businesses to provide education as a first response. Over the first year of the ban being in effect, health departments in Peoria, Tazewell, Woodford, and Fulton counties received hundreds of complaints. As an indicative example, Tazewell County adopted a three-strikes system before instituting fines.

== Loopholes ==
Some business owners operate a smoking area through a loophole in the law. For around $5,000, a business could install a "smoking hut" or "shack" outside their establishment. Since the state and city regulations have not been formed yet, owners can install these for their employees as well as their customers. Some bar owners even install televisions in their smoking huts.

== Assistance for hospital employees ==
From 1993 to 1996, the University of Missouri-Columbia School of Medicine decided to run an experiment partially funded by the Robert Wood Johnson Foundation (RWJF), which has a national program known as the Tobacco Policy Research and Evaluation Program. The researchers began to test if the new smoke-free restrictions put on hospitals would hinder or help the facility's employees. They tested over a thousand hospitals. Notable findings included hospital compliance to the new laws, employees who were under this ban were more likely to quit, and smokers under pressure from fellow employees to follow the rules were more apt to stop smoking as well.

== Challenges to the law ==
The Smoke-Free Illinois Act has been challenged many times in Illinois circuit courts and, generally speaking, cases have been dismissed when various challenges were raised. In an effort to make the statute enforceable, the General Assembly passed changes to the Smoke-Free Illinois Act to specify that enforcement would occur before an administrative agency, rather than before courts. However, the new amendments specify that the agency, the Illinois Department of Public Health, does not have the authority to pass rules or regulations under the new statute without first gaining approval from the Legislature. Some believe that this renders the statute unconstitutional because enforcement actions before the agency will concern only interpretation and enforcement of a statute, rather than of a statute in combination with an agency's rules or regulations. Interpreting and enforcing statutes without reference to agency rules or regulations has traditionally been the province of the Illinois courts, rather than being left to agencies to adjudicate.

== See also ==
- List of smoking bans in the United States
- Tobacco in the United States
