= Rita Mayfield =

American politician

Member of the Illinois House of Representatives from the 60th district
- Incumbent
- Assumed office July 6, 2010
- Preceded by: Eddie Washington

Personal details
- Party: Democratic
- Education: Columbia College; Benedictine University

Rita Mayfield is a Democratic member of the Illinois House of Representatives who has represented the 60th district since July 2010.

== Early life and career ==
She has a Bachelor of Science degree from Columbia College in Computer Information Systems and a Master of Science from Benedictine University in Management and Organization Behavior with an Emphasis in Organization Development.

== Illinois House of Representatives ==
On June 4, 2010, State Representative Eddie Washington died of a heart attack. On July 6, 2010, Mayfield was appointed by local Democratic leaders to succeed Washington to serve in the Illinois House of Representatives from the 60th district. The 60th district, at the time, included all or parts of Waukegan and North Chicago. During the 2011 decennial redistricting process, portions of Gurnee, Beach Park, and Park City were added to the 60th district.

As of July 3, 2022, Representative Mayfield is a member of the following Illinois House committees:

- Appropriations - Elementary & Secondary Education Committee (HAPE)
- Appropriations - Human Services Committee (HAPH)
- (Chairwoman of) Appropriations - Public Safety Committee (HAPP)
- Consumer Protection Committee (HCON)
- Elementary & Secondary Education: School Curriculum & Policies Committee (HELM)
- Energy & Environment Committee (HENG)
- Firefighters and First Responders Subcommittee (SHPF-FIRE)
- Insurance Committee (HINS)
- Law Enforcement Subcommittee (SHPF-LAWE)
- Police & Fire Committee (SHPF)
- (Chairwoman of) Product Safety Subcommittee (HCON-PROD)
- Small Business, Tech Innovation, and Entrepreneurship Committee (SBTE)
- (Co-chairwoman of) Special Issues (INS) Subcommittee (HINS-SPIS)

== Electoral history ==
Illinois 60th Representative District General Election, 2020
Party	Candidate	Votes	%
Democratic	Rita Mayfield (incumbent)	25,886	100.0
Total votes		25,886	100.0

Illinois 60th Representative District Democratic Primary, 2020
Party	Candidate	Votes	%
Democratic	Rita Mayfield (incumbent)	7,020	81.07
Democratic	Diana Burdette	1,639	18.93
Total votes		8,659	100.0

Illinois 60th Representative District General Election, 2018
Party	Candidate	Votes	%	±%
Democratic	Rita Mayfield (incumbent)	18,694	100.0	+23.57%
Total votes		18,694	100.0	

Illinois 60th Representative District General Election, 2016
Party	Candidate	Votes	%	±%
Democratic	Rita Mayfield (incumbent)	22,402	76.43	+9.27%
Republican	Robert L. Ochsner	6,909	23.57	N/A
Total votes		29,311	100.0	

Illinois 60th Representative District General Election, 2014
Party	Candidate	Votes	%	±%
Democratic	Rita Mayfield (incumbent)	11,476	67.16	−7.74%
Independent	Keith E. Turner	5,611	32.84	N/A
Total votes		17,087	100.0	

Illinois 60th Representative District General Election, 2012
Party	Candidate	Votes	%	±%
Democratic	Rita Mayfield (incumbent)	20,613	74.90	−19.36%
Republican	Jackie Burleson	6,906	25.10	N/A
Total votes		27,519	100.0	

Illinois 60th Representative District General Election, 2010
Party	Candidate	Votes	%
Democratic	Rita Mayfield (incumbent)	10,567	94.26
Write-in	Valerie DeVost	643	5.74
Total votes		11,210	100.0
