= Hospital Uninsured Patient Discount Act (Illinois) =

The Hospital Uninsured Patient Discount Act (210 ILCS 89) is an Illinois law that requires hospitals in Illinois to give most uninsured patients a discount on their medical bills. The act took effect on April 1, 2009.

It is the patient's responsibility to apply for this discount within 60 days of receiving their bill. The bill must contain information about how to apply.

== Implementation ==
Almost any uninsured patient may apply for this discount if they choose. In order to apply a person must earn less than six times the Illinois poverty line. For example, a patient in a family of four is eligible for this discount if the value of the family's income (including some assets) is less than $132,300 (six times the Illinois poverty line for a family of four). The discount is based on a sliding scale.

A person eligible for the discount will receive a 70% discount if the family income is six times the poverty line, 75% for 4.01 to 5 times the poverty line, 80% for 3.01 to 4 times the poverty line, 90% for 2.01 to 3 times the poverty line, and a 100% discount for those who earn double the poverty line or less. The poverty line is based on family size, income, and some assets.

As of 2011 the following qualifies as "below the poverty line" in the state of Illinois:

- For a single person family an annual income of less than $10,830
- For a 2-person family: $14,570 or less
- 3: $18,310 or less
- 4: $22,050 or less
- 5: $25,790 or less
- 6: $29,530 or less
- 7: $33,270 or less
- 8: $37,010 or less
- 9: $40,750 or less
- 10: $44,490 or less

== Problems ==
Problems with the bill have been noted. A common critiques is that the bill requires a person to prove that they live in the state of Illinois, which can be difficult for someone who is homeless. The bill also does not address people who have jobs that require health insurance plans through the company. This is an issue as some people in Illinois complain that if they were not required to get health insurance through their work (which might offer a mediocre plan), they would be able to have more coverage under this act. Some people who have insurance through work may have to pay for their plan and pay more of each medical bill as well. Thus for some, these required health care plans actually cost more than not having one.

This bill also forbids hospitals to make a patient pay more than 25% of their annual income within a 12-month period, with the percentage criticized as too high.
