= Wendell E. Jones =

American educator, businessman, and politician

Member of the Illinois Senate
- In office 1998–2007
- Preceded by: Peter Fitzgerald
- Succeeded by: Matt Murphy

Personal details
- Born: Wendell Edward Jones; November 4, 1937 Battle Creek, Michigan, U.S.
- Died: October 25, 2011 (aged 73) Fort Myers, Florida, U.S.
- Party: Republican
- Education: Ball State University; Northern Illinois University
- Occupation: Politician, educator, businessman

Wendell Edward Jones (November 4, 1937 – October 25, 2011) was an American educator, businessman, and politician.

Born in Battle Creek, Michigan, Jones received his bachelor's degree in speech and hearing therapy and his master's degree in special education from Ball State University. Jones also went to graduated school at Northern Illinois University. He was a speech therapist in the Palatine, Illinois School District. He was also a salesman and was the owner of a promotional products company: "Wenco." Jones served on the Palatine Board of Trustees from 1967 to 1973 and as Palatine Village President from 1973 to 1977. Jones was a Republican. In 1998, he was appointed by local Republican leaders to the Illinois Senate succeed Peter Fitzgerald upon the latter's election to the United States Senate. From 1998 to 2007, Jones served in the Illinois State Senate. Jones did not run for reelection in 2006 and was succeeded by Harper College District 512 trustee and fellow Republican Matt Murphy. Jones died in Fort Myers, Florida.
