= Shane Cultra =

American politician (born 1950/51)

Member of the Illinois Senate from the 53rd district
- In office January 10, 2011 – January 9, 2013
- Preceded by: Dan Rutherford
- Succeeded by: Jason Barickman

Member of the Illinois House of Representatives from the 105th district
- In office January 11, 2003 – January 9, 2011
- Preceded by: William Black (redistricted)
- Succeeded by: Russell Geisler

Personal details
- Born: 1950 or 1951 (age 75–76) Onarga, Illinois
- Party: Republican
- Spouse: Peggy
- Children: Four
- Education: Michigan State University
- Profession: Nursery owner

Shane Cultra (born 1950 or 1951) is an American politician and former Republican member of the Illinois General Assembly.

== Early life and career ==
Cultra was born in Onarga, Illinois. He graduated from Michigan State University with an agricultural technology degree in landscape & nursery management. He served on the Iroquois County Board for fourteen years including two years as chairman of the board. Cultra, and his wife Virginia, have four children.

== Illinois General Assembly ==
In 2002, he was elected to the Illinois House of Representatives from the 105th district. The 105th district, as drawn at the time, included parts of Champaign, Ford, Iroquois Livingston, and McLean counties in east-central Illinois.

Cultra was selected by local party leaders in late 2010 to replace Dan Rutherford, who had been elected Illinois Treasurer.

Cultra resigned from the Illinois House effective midnight January 9, 2011 and was succeeded by his longtime legislative aide Russell Geisler for a single day. On January 10, 2011, Jason Barickman, the Chair of the Champaign County Republicans, was appointed to succeed Geisler for the remainder of the 96th General Assembly and to serve during the 97th General Assembly.

During the 2011 decennial redistricting, the 53rd district was redrawn to include portions of Bloomington and Normal while losing Tazewell County. In the 2012 Republican primary, Barickman opted to run for the Illinois Senate against Shane Cultra. Barickman defeated Cultra with 19,713 votes to Cultra's 11,861 votes.

== Post-legislative career ==
In 2016, Lyle Behrends of Ashkum succeeded Cultra as Chair of the Iroquois County Republican Party. That same year, Mike Tilstra, the Mayor of Onarga, chose to step down as Mayor. Cultra ran unopposed in the 2017 election. In the 2021 election, Cultra defeated Sarah Barnett 99 votes to 89 votes (52.66% to 47.34%).

On March 7, 2022, Cultra filed with the Illinois Board of Elections to run for the United States House of Representatives from Illinois's 2nd congressional district in the 2022 Republican primary. He finished second of three candidates in the June 28th primary, losing to former Iroquois County Board member Thomas Lynch.
