= Marlow H. Colvin =

American politician

Member of the Illinois House of Representatives from the 33rd district
- In office 2001–2012
- Succeeded by: Marcus C. Evans, Jr.

Personal details
- Born: March 28, 1964 (age 62) Chicago, Illinois, U.S.
- Party: Democratic

Marlow H. Colvin (born March 28, 1964) is a former Democratic member of the Illinois House of Representatives, representing the 33rd District from 2001 to 2012. He is a graduate of St. Felicitas Elementary School, St. Willibrord Catholic High School and Chicago State University where he earned a degree in political science.

In March 2012, one week after winning an unopposed primary for renomination to his seat, Colvin announced he was resigning from the House in order to assume a private sector job with Commonwealth Edison.
