= Eddie Washington =

American politician

Member of the Illinois House of Representatives from the 60th district
- In office January 8, 2003 – June 4, 2010
- Preceded by: Karen May (redistricted)
- Succeeded by: Rita Mayfield

Personal details
- Born: June 8, 1953 East St. Louis, Illinois
- Died: June 4, 2010 (aged 56) Chicago, Illinois
- Party: Democratic
- Profession: Metra Conductor

Eddie Washington (June 8, 1953 – June 4, 2010) was a Democratic member of the Illinois House of Representatives, representing the 60th District from 2003 until 2010.

In 1998, Washington was elected a trustee for the North Shore Sanitary District. Washington defeated Jerry L. Johnson, a past Mayor of North Chicago, and Jay Ukena in the 2002 Democratic primary for the nomination for the Illinois House in the 60th district. He was elected to the Illinois House of Representatives in 2002 general election. The 60th district, at the time, included all or parts of Waukegan and North Chicago.

He was the sergeant at arms for the Illinois Legislative Black Caucus. Washington died on June 4, 2010, after suffering a heart attack. His appointed successor, Rita Mayfield, took office on July 6, 2010.
