= Matt Murphy (Illinois politician) =

American politician

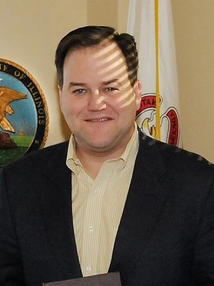

Member of the Illinois Senate from the 27th district
- In office January 10, 2007 – September 15, 2016
- Preceded by: Wendell E. Jones
- Succeeded by: Tom Rooney

Personal details
- Born: March 11, 1970 (age 56) Mount Prospect, Illinois
- Party: Republican
- Spouse: Julie Murphy
- Children: Four
- Education: John Marshall Law School (J.D.); University of Iowa (B.S.)
- Profession: Attorney

Matt Murphy (born March 11, 1970) is an American Republican politician and former member of the Illinois Senate, representing the 27th district from 2007 until his resignation in September 2016. The 27th district includes parts of Arlington Heights, Barrington, Buffalo Grove, Inverness, Palatine, Wheeling, Prospect Heights and South Barrington.

On August 11, 2016, Murphy announced his resignation from the Illinois Senate to take a position with Mac Strategies Group.

== Early life and career ==
Murphy grew up in Mt. Prospect and attended St. Viator High School in Arlington Heights. He has served as a Harper College Trustee and as a Trustee of the Greater Palatine Area Chamber of Commerce. He is a practicing attorney with Brian J. McManus & Associates, a law firm devoted to representing claimants in personal injury lawsuits. In 2003, Murphy was elected to the Harper College Board of Trustees for a six-year term. He resides in Palatine with his wife, Julie, and their four children.

== Illinois Senate ==
Murphy was elected to the Illinois Senate on November 7, 2006, defeating Peter Gutzmer to succeed retiring Republican Senator Wendell E. Jones. Murphy won the Republican primary on March 21, 2006, defeating Mayor of Palatine Rita Mullins. He was re-elected in 2008.

During the 2008 Republican Party presidential primaries, Murphy worked on behalf of the presidential campaign of former U.S. Senator Fred Thompson serving as a congressional district chair for Illinois's 8th congressional district.

Murphy was narrowly defeated in the Republican primary for Lieutenant Governor of Illinois on February 2, 2010, by Jason Plummer. In 2013, Murphy declined to run to become the Chair of the Illinois Republican Party.

In 2013, Murphy became the deputy Republican leader in the Illinois Senate, a position he held until his resignation, making him the second highest ranking Republican in the Senate.

On August 12, 2016, in a surprise move, Murphy announced he would resign from the Illinois Senate in order to take a position with Mac Strategies Group. His resignation would be effective on September 15. In early 2026 it was announced that Murphy was exploring sites in Arlington Hieghts to house his Senate papers and archives to save for future generations of area leaders.
