= 2010 Illinois Senate election =

- November 2, 2010

21 of 59 total seats in the Illinois State Senate 30 seats needed for a majority
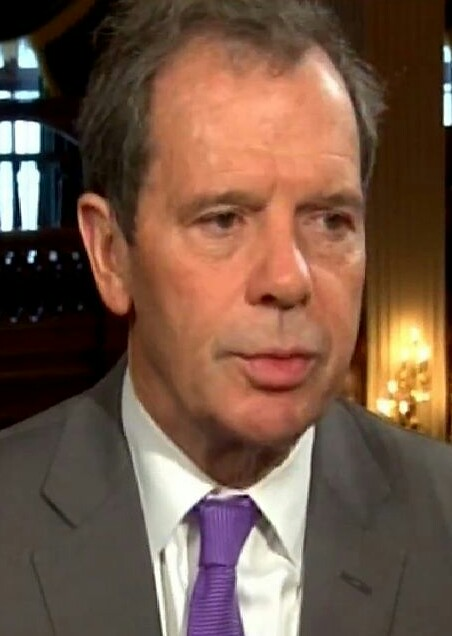

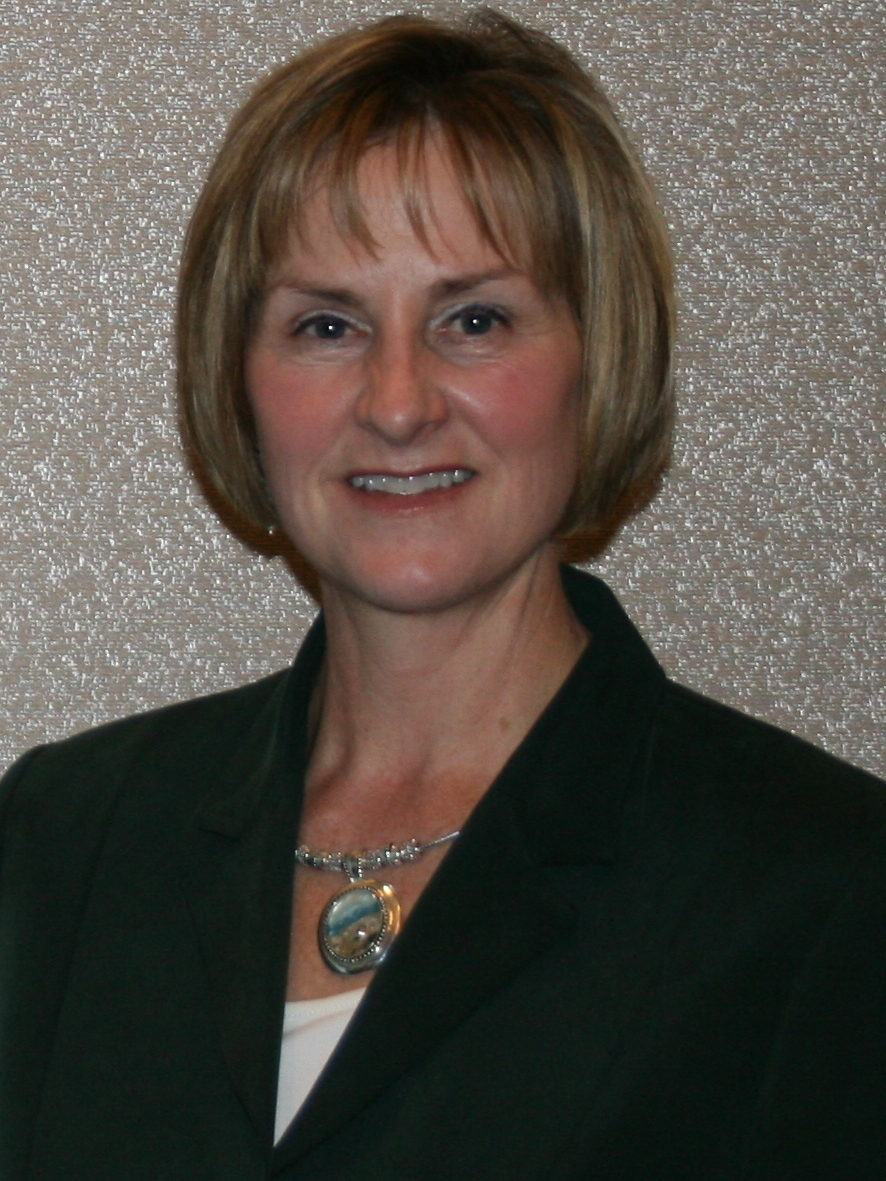
	Majority party	Minority party
Leader	John Cullerton	Christine Radogno
Party	Democratic	Republican
Leader's seat	6th-Chicago	41st-La Grange
Last election	37	22
Seats won	35	24
Seat change	▼2	▲2
Popular vote	634,294	530,130
Percentage	54.22%	45.15%
Swing	▲0.25%	▲0.38%
- Results: Republican gain Democratic hold Republican hold No election Vote Share: 50–60% 60–70% 80–90% >90% 50–60% 60–70% 70–80% >90%
President before election
John Cullerton
Democratic
President-Elect
John Cullerton
Democratic

The 2010 elections for the Illinois Senate was conducted on Tuesday, November 2, 2010. The 2010 primary election was conducted on Tuesday, February 2, 2010. State Senators elected this year sat for two year terms, all of which expired at the beginning of the next General Assembly.

== Predictions ==
Source	Ranking	As of
Governing	Likely D	November 1, 2010

== Overview ==
Illinois State Senate Elections, 2010
Party	Votes	Percentage	Seats up	Seats not up	Total before	Total after	+/–
Democratic	634,294	54.22%	14	23	37	35	-2
Republican	530,130	45.15%	7	15	22	24	+2
Totals	1,164,424	100.00%	21	38	59	59	—

== Individual results ==
District	Party	Incumbent	Status	Party	Candidate	Votes	%
1	Democratic	Antonio Munoz		Democratic	Antonio Munoz		
4	Democratic	Kimberly A. Lightford		Democratic	Kimberly A. Lightford		
7	Democratic	Heather Steans		Democratic	Heather Steans		
7	Democratic	Heather Steans		Republican	Adam Robinson		
10	Democratic	James DeLeo	retired	Democratic	John G. Mulroe		
10	Democratic	James DeLeo	retired	Republican	Brian G. Doherty		
13	Democratic	Kwame Raoul		Democratic	Kwame Raoul		
16	Democratic	Jacqueline Y. Collins		Democratic	Jacqueline Y. Collins		
19	Democratic	Maggie Crotty		Democratic	Maggie Crotty		
19	Democratic	Maggie Crotty		Republican	Adam Wojcik		
22	Democratic	Michael Noland		Democratic	Michael Noland		
22	Democratic	Michael Noland		Republican	Steven Rauschenberger		
25	Republican	Chris Lauzen		Republican	Chris Lauzen		
25	Republican	Chris Lauzen		Democratic	Leslie N. Juby		
28	Republican	John J. Millner		Republican	John J. Millner		
28	Republican	John J. Millner		Democratic	Corinne Michelle Pierog		
31	Democratic	Michael Bond		Democratic	Michael Bond		
31	Democratic	Michael Bond		Republican	Suzi Schmidt		
34	Republican	Dave Syverson		Republican	Dave Syverson		
34	Republican	Dave Syverson		Democratic	Marla Wilson		
37	Republican	Dale Risinger		Republican	Dale Risinger		
40	Democratic	Toi Hutchinson		Democratic	Toi Hutchinson		
40	Democratic	Toi Hutchinson		Republican	Adam Baumgartner		
43	Democratic	Arthur Wilhelmi		Democratic	Arthur Wilhelmi		
43	Democratic	Arthur Wilhelmi		Republican	Cedra Crenshaw		
46	Democratic	David Koehler		Democratic	David Koehler		
49	Democratic	Deanna Demuzio		Democratic	Deanna Demuzio		
49	Democratic	Deanna Demuzio		Republican	Sam McCann		
51	Republican	Frank C. Watson	resigned	Republican	Kyle McCarter		
51	Republican	Frank C. Watson	resigned	Democratic	Tim Dudley		
52	Democratic	Mike Frerichs		Democratic	Mike Frerichs		
52	Democratic	Mike Frerichs		Republican	Al Reynolds		
55	Republican	Dale Righter		Republican	Dale Righter		
55	Republican	Dale Righter		Democratic	Josh Weger		
58	Republican	David Luechtefeld		Republican	David Luechtefeld		
58	Republican	David Luechtefeld		Democratic	Jeremy Randal Walker		

== See also ==
- Illinois House of Representatives elections, 2010
- Illinois Senate
