= Calvin Sutker =

American politician (1923–2013)

Member of the Cook County Board of Commissioners from the 13th district
- In office December 1994 – December 2002
- Preceded by: District created
- Succeeded by: Larry Suffredin

Member of the Illinois House of Representatives from the 56th district
- In office January 7, 1985 – January 14, 1991
- Preceded by: Aaron Jaffe
- Succeeded by: Jeffrey Schoenberg

Chairman of Democratic Party of Illinois
- In office January 4, 1985 – 1986
- Preceded by: Philip J. Rock
- Succeeded by: Vince Demuzio

Personal details
- Born: May 23, 1923 Forest Park, Illinois, U.S.
- Died: April 25, 2013 (aged 89) Evanston, Illinois, U.S.
- Party: Democratic
- Spouse: Phyllis (née Twery)
- Children: Four children
- Education: University of Chicago (B.A.); University of Chicago (J.D.)
- Profession: Attorney

Military service
- Allegiance: United States
- Branch/service: United States Army
- Years of service: 1942-1945
- Battles/wars: World War II

Calvin Sutker (May 23, 1923 – April 25, 2013) was an American politician and lawyer. Over his nearly four decades in politics, Sutker served as a Skokie Village Board member, Niles Township Democratic Committeeman, Democratic National Committeeman from Illinois, Chairman of the Illinois Democratic Party, a member of the Illinois House of Representatives and a Cook County Commissioner.

== Early life ==
Sutker was born May 23, 1923, in Forest Park, Illinois. He was raised in Forest Park and attended Proviso High School before moving to Chicago and transferring to Austin High School. He met his wife Phyllis while at Austin. They married in 1946. In 1942, he enlisted in the United States Army and served in Europe during World War II. He served in one of the battalions that liberated Dachau concentration camp. After the war, he received his bachelor's degree in 1947 and J.D. degree in 1950 from University of Chicago and moved to Skokie to practice law. He was Jewish.

== Political career ==
In 1965, Sutker joined the Skokie Village Board as a member of the Caucus Party. In 1966, he helped to pass one of Illinois' first fair housing ordinances. In 1969, he chose to run for Mayor on the Democratic slate rather than seek reelection as a trustee on the Caucus Party's slate. Despite an endorsement from Senator Adlai Stevenson III, the Democratic slate was defeated by the Caucus Party in the April 1969 election. In 1973, he became the Democratic Committeeman for Niles Township. In 1978, he became chief attorney for the Forest Preserve District of Cook County. That same year, he became a member of the Illinois Democratic Central Committee. During this period he would also serve as Illinois' representative to the Democratic National Committee.

In 1980 he began a year long campaign to be slated as the Democratic nominee for Illinois Secretary of State including a statewide tour. During this campaign, he came out against a librarian liability bill that would make librarians criminally responsible for distributing "harmful" reading materials. However, at the slating session, he withdrew allowing Jerome Cosentino, the Illinois State Treasurer, to be slated.

On January 4, 1985, Sutker was unanimously elected chair of the Illinois Democratic Central Committee, succeeding Philip J. Rock who had resigned to focus on his campaign in the 1984 United States Senate election in Illinois.

=== Illinois House of Representatives ===
In 1985, he appointed himself to the Illinois House of Representatives to succeed Aaron Jaffe, his predecessor as Niles Township Democratic Committeeman. Jaffe had been appointed to a judgeship. He is credited with helping establish the Skokie Northshore Sculpture Park.

Later that year, Niles Township Clerk Louis Black announced a challenge to Sutker in the 1986 Democratic primary. He defeated Louis Black and a challenger for his role as Niles Township Democratic Committeeman in the primary. However, he lost his seat as the Democratic Central Committeeman for Illinois' 9th congressional district to Jeffrey Paul Smith. This made him ineligible to serve as Chair of the Illinois Democratic Party. He was succeeded as chairman by Senator Vince Demuzio, who became the first chairman from downstate in fifty years. In the general election, he held off Republican challenger and District 219 School Board president Sheldon Marcus. In 1988, he defeated Jeffrey Schoenberg to win the Democratic nomination.

In 1990, he ran for the Democratic nomination for Cook County Clerk. He was slated by the Cook County Democratic Party, but lost to independent Democrat and former Chicago City Council member David Orr. In the Illinois House, he was succeeded by former challenger Jeffrey Schoenberg.

=== Cook County Commissioner ===
In 1993, the Cook County Board of Commissioners announced a move from two multi-member districts that elect ten members from Chicago and seven from the suburbs to seventeen single member districts. In 1993, Sutker announced his candidacy for one of these newly created districts. In the Democratic primary he defeated former Federal Maritime Commission member Vera Paktor and lawyer Jeffrey Paul Smith and defeated Republican Lourdes Mon in the general election. In 1998, he challenged incumbent John Stroger for the Democratic nomination for president of the Cook County Board of Commissioners, citing the construction of Cook County Hospital and the need for ethics reforms as reasons he opted to challenge stroger. Sutker lost to Stroger by a margin of approximately 2 to 1.

In 2000, Sutker proposed an ordinance to create a residency requirement for new Cook County employees, similar to the ordinance Chicago has had since at least 1922. The proposal was unanimously adopted by the board.

In the 2002 Democratic primary he faced off against attorney Larry Suffredin of Evanston. Suffredin was endorsed by U.S. Representative Jan Schakowsky, Evanston Mayor Lorraine H. Morton and State Senator Carol Ronen while Sutker had the support of State Representative Lou Lang and 50th ward Alderman Bernard Stone. In an upset, Sutker lost renomination in 2002 to Larry Sufredin. Sutker won Niles Township and Chicago's 50th ward by a combined total of 3,668 votes, but lost in Evanston, New Trier Township and Chicago's 49th ward by a combined total of 8,129 votes.

== Later life and death ==
After his defeat, Sutker remained active with many Jewish charities. During his lifetime his involvement, including among other things, serving as president of Old Orchard B'nai B'rith, and chairman of the Anti-Defamation League of Metropolitan Chicago. It was also during this time that he first spoke about what he witnessed during the liberation of Dachau concentration camp. In 2006, the forest preserve near the Illinois Holocaust Museum and Education Center was named in his honor.

In 2005, Sutker handed over the leadership of the Niles Township Democratic Organization to State Representative Lou Lang.

Sutker died at Evanston Hospital in Evanston, Illinois, on April 25, 2013, at age 89. The Sutker family remains involved in politics. One of his daughters, Edie Sue Sutker, is currently a Village Trustee in Skokie and another daughter, Shelley Sutker-Dermer, is a Cook County judge.
