= Illinois's 4th House of Representatives district =

American legislative district

Illinois's 4th State House of Representatives district
Representative
Lilian Jiménez; D–Chicago
since 2022
- Demographics: 40.7% White; 6.8% Black; 45.2% Hispanic; 3.7% Asian; 0.1% Native American; 0.0% Hawaiian/Pacific Islander; 0.4% Other; 3.1% Multiracial
- Population (2020): 107,602
- Created: 1983–present 1849–1873, 1957–1973

Illinois's 4th House of Representatives district is a Representative district within the Illinois House of Representatives located in Cook County, Illinois. It has been represented by Democrat Lilian Jiménez since December 15, 2022. The district was previously represented by Democrat Delia Ramirez from 2018 to 2022.

The district covers parts of Chicago and of Chicago's neighborhoods, it covers parts of Austin, Belmont Cragin, Hermosa, Humboldt Park, and West Town.

== Representative district history ==
Prior to the ratification of the 1848 Illinois Constitution, counties (or two or more counties) were designated a certain number of Senators and Representatives. With the ratification of the 1848 Illinois Constitution, Legislative and Representative districts were numbered and called by name. Each district was still assigned a certain number of Senators and Representatives. After the passage of the 1872 Apportionment, only Legislative districts were drawn with Representatives elected cumulatively. The 1954 amendment to the 1870 Illinois Constitution established Representative districts as separate from Legislative districts (with representatives still elected cumulatively). The boundaries of Representative and Legislative districts would differ. After the United States Supreme Court ruled in Reynolds v. Sims (1964) that "both houses of state legislatures must be apportioned according to districts of equal population," new districts were redrawn for the Illinois Senate and Illinois House of Representatives. While the Legislative districts were redrawn, the Governor and General Assembly failed to agree on Representative district boundaries. Under the 1954 amendment, "a 10-man bipartisan commission appointed by the governor from recommendations made by both parties" were directed to redraw boundaries but failed to do so in 1963. Because of this failure, and with no district boundaries redrawn, all Representative districts were temporarily merged into one at-large district with 177 representatives (the total number of representatives at the time). The 1964 Illinois House election had several candidates running for all 177 seats throughout the state. In 1965, the Representative districts were redrawn by the Illinois Legislative Reapportionment Commission and elections held in 1966 were done with separate districts. With the 1971 Apportionment (and adoption of the 1970 Illinois Constitution), Representative districts were abolished and representatives were once again elected cumulatively per Legislative district. After the passage of the Cutback Amendment in 1980, the number of Representatives was reduced from 177 to 118 with Representative districts re-established and now electing a single representative.

== Prominent representatives ==
Representative	Notes
Ebon C. Ingersoll	Elected to the U.S. House of Representatives from Illinois's 5th congressional district (1864 – 1871)
Jan Schakowsky	Elected to the U.S. House of Representatives from Illinois's 9th congressional district (1999 – present)
Delia Ramirez	Elected to the U.S. House of Representatives from Illinois's 3rd congressional district (2023 – present)

== List of representatives ==
=== 1849 – 1873 ===
Representative	Party	Years (Note: From 1870 to 1970, the GA met for a new session on the Wednesday after the first Monday of January.)	General Assembly (GA)	Electoral history	Counties represented
4th Representative district established with 1848 Illinois Constitution.
David Y. Bridges	Democratic	January 1, 1849 – January 6, 1851	16th	Elected in 1848; Was not re-elected in 1850	Johnson; Williamson
Wilfred Ferrell	Unknown	January 6, 1851 – January 3, 1853	17th	Elected in 1850; Was not re-elected in 1852	Johnson; Williamson
David Y. Bridges	Democratic	January 3, 1853 – January 1, 1855	18th	Elected back in 1852; Redistricted out in 1854 and retired.	Johnson; Williamson
Benjamin P. Hinch	N B Democratic	January 1, 1855 – January 5, 1857	19th	Elected in 1854; Was not re-elected in 1856	Gallatin; Saline
Ebon C. Ingersoll	Unknown	January 5, 1857 – January 3, 1859	20th	Elected in 1856; Was not re-elected in 1858	Gallatin; Saline
Thomas S. Hick	Democratic	January 3, 1859 – January 7, 1861	21st	Elected in 1858; Was not re-elected in 1860	Gallatin; Saline
William Elder	Unknown	January 7, 1861 – January 5, 1863	22nd	Elected in 1860; Redistricted out in 1862 and retired.	Gallatin; Saline
James W. Sharp	Unknown	January 5, 1863 – January 2, 1865	23rd	Elected in 1862; Was not re-elected in 1864	Lawrence; Wabash
D. H. Morgan	Democratic	January 2, 1865 – January 7, 1867	24th	Elected in 1864; Was not re-elected in 1866	Lawrence; Wabash
James M. Sharp	Unknown	January 7, 1867 – January 4, 1869	25th	Elected in 1866; Was not re-elected in 1868	Lawrence; Wabash
D. H. Morgan	Democratic	January 4, 1869 – January 4, 1871	26th	Elected back in 1868; Was not re-elected in 1870	Lawrence; Wabash
James B. Morray	Republican	January 4, 1871 – January 8, 1873	27th	Elected in 1870; Was not re-elected in 1872	Johnson
District abolished with 1872 Reapportionment as 3 Representatives were now elected cumulatively from Legislative districts.

=== 1957 – 1973 ===
Representative	Party	Party Control	Years (Note: Since 1970, the GA meets on the second Wednesday of January for a new session.)	General Assembly (GA)	Electoral history	Counties represented
District re-established in 1957.
Walter J. Reum	Republican	2 Republicans; 1 Democrat	January 9, 1957 – January 9, 1963	70th 71st 72nd	Redistricted from the 23rd Legislative district and re-elected in 1956; Re-elected in 1958; Re-elected in 1960; Ran for the Republican nomination for State Treasurer and lost in 1962.	Cook
Claude A. Walker	Republican	2 Republicans; 1 Democrat	January 9, 1957 – January 6, 1965	70th 71st 72nd 73rd	Elected in 1956; Re-elected in 1958; Re-elected in 1960; Re-elected in 1962; Did not run in At-large election and retired.	Cook
Raymond J. Welsh Jr.	Democratic	2 Republicans; 1 Democrat	January 9, 1957 – January 6, 1965	70th 71st 72nd 73rd	Elected in 1956; Re-elected in 1958; Re-elected in 1960; Re-elected in 1962; Ran in the At-large district election and won re-election in 1964.	Cook
Richard A. Walsh	Republican	2 Republicans; 1 Democrat	January 9, 1963 – January 6, 1965	73rd	Elected in 1962; Ran in the At-large district election and won re-election in 1964.	Cook
The district was temporarily abolished from 1965 to 1967 due to the Redistricting Commission in 1963 failing to reach an agreement. An at-large election was held electing 177 Representatives from across the state.
Arthur E. Simmons	Republican	2 Republicans; 1 Democrat	January 4, 1967 – January 10, 1973	75th 76th 77th	Redistricted from At-large district and re-elected in 1966; Re-elected in 1968; Re-elected in 1970; Retired	Cook
Robert S. Juckett Sr.	Republican	2 Republicans; 1 Democrat	January 4, 1967 – January 10, 1973	75th 76th 77th	Elected in 1966; Re-elected in 1968; Re-elected in 1970; Redistricted to 4th Legislative district and re-elected in 1972	Cook
Edward A. Warman	Democratic	2 Republicans; 1 Democrat	January 4, 1967 – January 13, 1971	75th 76th	Redistricted from At-large district and re-elected in 1966; Re-elected in 1968; Ran for Illinois's 13th congressional district in 1970 and lost.	Cook
Aaron Jaffe	Democratic	2 Republicans; 1 Democrat	January 13, 1971 – January 10, 1973	77th	Elected in 1970; Redistricted to 4th Legislative district and re-elected in 1972	Cook
District abolished with 1971 Reapportionment as Representatives were once again elected from Legislative districts.

=== 1983 – Present ===
Representative	Party	Years	General Assembly (GA)	Electoral history	Counties represented
District re-established with representatives now elected one per district with the passage of the Cutback Amendment
Woody Bowman	Democratic	January 12, 1983 – ???	83rd 84th 85th	Redistricted from the 11th Legislative district and re-elected in 1982; Re-elected in 1984; Re-elected in 1986; Re-elected in 1988; Retired before the end of the 86th GA	Cook
Woody Bowman	Democratic	January 12, 1983 – ???	86th	Redistricted from the 11th Legislative district and re-elected in 1982; Re-elected in 1984; Re-elected in 1986; Re-elected in 1988; Retired before the end of the 86th GA	Cook
Vacant		??? – ???	86th		Cook
Jan Schakowsky	Democratic	??? – January 13, 1993	86th	Elected in 1990 and appointed before the end of the 86th GA; Redistricted to the 18th Representative district and won re-election in 1992.	Cook
Jan Schakowsky	Democratic	??? – January 13, 1993	87th	Elected in 1990 and appointed before the end of the 86th GA; Redistricted to the 18th Representative district and won re-election in 1992.	Cook
Edgar Lopez	Democratic	January 13, 1993 – January 10, 2001	88th 89th 90th 91st	Elected in 1992; Re-elected in 1994; Re-elected in 1996; Re-elected in 1998; Lost renomination in 2000	Cook
Cynthia Soto	Democratic	January 10, 2001 – December 2018	92nd 93rd 94th 95th 96th 97th 98th 99th	Elected in 2000; Re-elected in 2002; Re-elected in 2004; Re-elected in 2006; Re-elected in 2008; Re-elected in 2010; Re-elected in 2012; Re-elected in 2014; Re-elected in 2016; Retired and resigned in 2018	Cook
Cynthia Soto	Democratic	January 10, 2001 – December 2018	100th	Elected in 2000; Re-elected in 2002; Re-elected in 2004; Re-elected in 2006; Re-elected in 2008; Re-elected in 2010; Re-elected in 2012; Re-elected in 2014; Re-elected in 2016; Retired and resigned in 2018	Cook
Vacant		December 2018	100th		Cook
Delia Ramirez	Democratic	December 2018 – December 14, 2022	100th	Elected in 2018 and appointed the same year Re-elected in 2020; Ran for Illinois's 3rd congressional district in 2022 and won.	Cook
Delia Ramirez	Democratic	December 2018 – December 14, 2022	101st 102nd	Elected in 2018 and appointed the same year Re-elected in 2020; Ran for Illinois's 3rd congressional district in 2022 and won.	Cook
Vacant		December 14, 2022 – December 15, 2022	102nd		Cook
Lilian Jiménez	Democratic	December 15, 2022 – present	102nd 103rd	Elected in 2022 and appointed the same year	Cook

== Historic District Boundaries ==
Years	County	Municipalities/Townships	Notes
2023 – present	Cook	Chicago (Austin, Belmont Cragin, Hermosa, Humboldt Park, West Town)	
2013 – 2023	Cook	Chicago (Hermosa, Humboldt Park, Logan Square, and West Town)	
2003 – 2013	Cook	Chicago (Humboldt Park, West Town)	
1993 – 2003	Cook		
1983 – 1993	Cook	Chicago	
1967 – 1973	Cook	Parts of Maine Township, parts of Niles Township	
1957 – 1965	Cook	Oak Park Township, parts of Proviso Township, River Forest Township, Riverside Township	
1871 – 1873	Johnson	Cedar Bluff, Cypress Creek, Goreville, Granstsburg, Grays Mill, Reynoldsburg, Shinspoint, Vienna	
1863 – 1871	Lawrence; Wabash	Armstrong, Bridgeport, Centreville, Friendsville, Lawrenceville, Mier, Mount Carmel, Rochester, Ruark, Russellville, St. Francisville, Sumner	
1855 – 1863	Gallatin; Saline	America, Bankton, Bowlesville, Curran, Eldorado, Equality, Frankfort, Galatia, Harrisburg, Indian Creek, Mitchellsville, New Haven, New Mark, Raleigh, Saline Mines, Shawneetown (Old Shawneetown), Somerset	
1849 – 1855	Johnson; Williamson	Bainbridge, Big Bay, Bolton, Fredonia, Marion, Mount Pleasant (Pleasant Grove), Sarahville, Sulphur Spa, Vienna,	

== Electoral history ==
=== 2030 – 2022 ===
2022 Illinois House of Representatives election
Party	Candidate	Votes	%	±%
Democratic	Lilian Jiménez	19,111	88.23	−11.77%
Republican	JD Sloat	2549	11.77	N/A
Total votes		21,660	100.0	

=== 2020 – 2012 ===
2020 Illinois House of Representatives election
Party	Candidate	Votes	%	±%
Democratic	Delia C. Ramirez (incumbent)	38,951	100.0	+0.02%
Total votes		38,951	100.0	

2018 Illinois House of Representatives election
Party	Candidate	Votes	%	±%
Democratic	Delia C. Ramirez	31,797	99.98	−0.02%
Write-in		6	0.02	N/A
Total votes		31,803	100.0	

2016 Illinois House of Representatives election
Party	Candidate	Votes	%	±%
Democratic	Cynthia Soto (incumbent)	34,077	100.0	N/A
Total votes		34,077	100.0	

2014 Illinois House of Representatives election
Party	Candidate	Votes	%	±%
Democratic	Cynthia Soto (incumbent)	15,342	100.0	N/A
Total votes		15,342	100.0	

2012 Illinois House of Representatives election
Party	Candidate	Votes	%	±%
Democratic	Cynthia Soto (incumbent)	27,029	100.0	N/A
Total votes		27,029	100.0	

=== 2010 – 2002 ===
2010 Illinois House of Representatives election
Party	Candidate	Votes	%	±%
Democratic	Cynthia Soto (incumbent)	14,064	100.0	N/A
Total votes		14,064	100.0	

2008 Illinois House of Representatives election
Party	Candidate	Votes	%	±%
Democratic	Cynthia Soto (incumbent)	25,053	100.0	+0.20%
Total votes		25,053	100.0	

2006 Illinois House of Representatives election
Party	Candidate	Votes	%	±%
Democratic	Cynthia Soto (incumbent)	14,305	99.80	−0.20%
Write-in		28	0.20	N/A
Total votes		14,333	100.0	

2004 Illinois House of Representatives election
Party	Candidate	Votes	%	±%
Democratic	Cynthia Soto (incumbent)	22,389	100.0	N/A
Total votes		22,389	100.0	

2002 Illinois House of Representatives election
Party	Candidate	Votes	%	±%
Democratic	Cynthia Soto (incumbent)	13,475	100.0	N/A
Total votes		13,475	100.0	

=== 2000 – 1992 ===
2000 Illinois House of Representatives election
Party	Candidate	Votes	%	±%
Democratic	Cynthia Soto	18,924	100.0	N/A
Total votes		18,924	100.0	

2000 Illinois House of Representatives Democratic primary
Party	Candidate	Votes	%
Democratic	Cynthia Soto	6,498	57.01
Democratic	Edgar I. Lopez (incumbent)	4,900	42.99
Total votes		11,398	100.0

1998 Illinois House of Representatives election
Party	Candidate	Votes	%	±%
Democratic	Edgar I. Lopez (incumbent)	10,330	100.0	+13.85%
Total votes		10,330	100.0	

1996 Illinois House of Representatives election
Party	Candidate	Votes	%	±%
Democratic	Edgar Lopez (incumbent)	15,248	86.15	+9.80%
Republican	John W. Duda	2451	13.84	−9.80%
Total votes		17,699	100.0	

1994 Illinois House of Representatives election
Party	Candidate	Votes	%	±%
Democratic	Edgar Lopez (incumbent)	7,303	76.35	−23.65%
Republican	Joseph F. Novak	2261	23.64	N/A
Total votes		9,564	100.0	

1992 Illinois House of Representatives election
Party	Candidate	Votes	%	±%
Democratic	Edgar Lopez	17,253	100.0	+36.42%
Total votes		17,253	100.0	

=== 1990 – 1982 ===
1990 Illinois House of Representatives election
Party	Candidate	Votes	%	±%
Democratic	Janice D. (Jan) Schakowsky	17,072	63.58	−3.06%
Republican	Joan W. Barr	9777	36.41	+3.06%
Total votes		26,849	100.0	

1988 Illinois House of Representatives election
Party	Candidate	Votes	%	±%
Democratic	Woody Bowman (incumbent)	25,970	66.64	−1.84%
Republican	Teresa A. Valdes	12995	33.35	+1.84%
Total votes		38,965	100.0	

1986 Illinois House of Representatives election
Party	Candidate	Votes	%	±%
Democratic	Woody Bowman (incumbent)	17,388	68.48	+4.39%
Republican	Jonathan M. Walker	8000	31.51	−4.40%
Total votes		25,388	100.0	

1984 Illinois House of Representatives election
Party	Candidate	Votes	%	±%
Democratic	Woody Bowman (incumbent)	23,112	64.09	+2.10%
Republican	Michael D. Poulos	12948	35.91	−2.10%
Write-in		1	0.00	N/A
Total votes		36,061	100.0	

1982 Illinois House of Representatives election
Party	Candidate	Votes	%
Democratic	Woody Bowman (incumbent)	20,260	61.99
Republican	Mary Jeanne (Dolly) Hallstrom (incumbent)	12,425	38.01
Total votes		32,685	100.0

=== 1970 – 1962 ===
1970 Illinois House of Representatives election
Party	Candidate	Votes	%
Democratic	Aaron Jaffe	78,951.5	29.94
Republican	Robert S. Juckett (incumbent)	67,188	25.48
Republican	Arthur E. Simmons (incumbent)	60,278.5	22.86
Democratic	Kenneth D. Lindquist	57,235.5	21.71
Write-in		2	0.00
Total votes		263,655.5	100.0

1968 Illinois House of Representatives election
Party	Candidate	Votes	%
Republican	Arthur E. Simmons (incumbent)	100,117	30.86
Republican	Robert S. Juckett, Sr. (incumbent)	81,500	25.12
Democratic	Edward A. Warman (incumbent)	79,851.5	24.61
Democratic	Kenneth D. Linquist	62,938.5	19.23
Total votes		324,407	100.0

1966 Illinois House of Representatives election
Party	Candidate	Votes	%
Republican	Arthur E. Simmons (incumbent)	93,698	34.18
Republican	Robert S. Juckett, Sr.	75,078	27.39
Democratic	Edward A. Warman (incumbent)	59,790.5	21.81
Democratic	Calvin R. Sutker	45,561.5	16.62
Total votes		274,128	100.0

1962 Illinois House of Representatives election
Party	Candidate	Votes	%
Republican	Claude A. Walker (incumbent)	55,294.5	35.83
Republican	Richard A. Walsh	51,640.5	33.46
Democratic	Raymond J. Welsh, Jr. (incumbent)	28,680	18.58
Democratic	Emmett P. Malloy, Jr.	18,705	12.12
Total votes		154,320	100.0

=== 1960 – 1956 ===
1960 Illinois House of Representatives election
Party	Candidate	Votes	%
Republican	Walter J. Reum (incumbent)	70,212.5	35.12
Republican	Claude A. Walker (incumbent)	60,427.5	30.22
Democratic	Raymond J. Welsh, Jr. (incumbent)	37,557	18.78
Democratic	William J. McGrath, Jr.	31,742	15.88
Total votes		199,939	100.0

1958 Illinois House of Representatives election
Party	Candidate	Votes	%
Republican	Walter J. Reum (incumbent)	51,770.5	37.93
Republican	Claude A. Walker (incumbent)	38,593	28.28
Democratic	Raymond J. Welsh, Jr. (incumbent)	25,914	18.99
Democratic	Marvin E. Lore	20,196	14.80
Total votes		136,473.5	100.0

1956 Illinois House of Representatives election
Party	Candidate	Votes	%
Republican	Walter J. Reum (incumbent)	71,689	37.95
Republican	Claude A. Walker	62,906.5	33.30
Democratic	Raymond J. Welsh, Jr.	27,650	14.64
Democratic	Edward B. O'Shea, Jr.	26,669.5	14.12
Total votes		188,915	100.0
