= Kelly Cassidy =

American politician

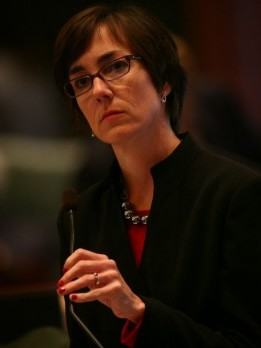

Member of the Illinois House of Representatives from the 14th district
- Incumbent
- Assumed office May 16, 2011
- Preceded by: Harry Osterman

Personal details
- Born: 1967 or 1968 (age 58–59) Philadelphia, Pennsylvania, U.S.
- Party: Democratic
- Spouse: Candace Gingrich (m. 2017)
- Children: 3
- Website: Campaign website Official Twitter

Kelly Cassidy (born 1967/1968) is an American politician from Chicago. She is a Democrat and a member of the Illinois House of Representatives. She was appointed to represent the 14th district, on Chicago's North Side, in April 2011 following incumbent Harry Osterman's election to the Chicago City Council. She took office on May 16, 2011. Most notably Kelly Cassidy was the chief sponsor of House Bill 1438, making Illinois the first state to legalize the commercial sale of recreational cannabis through the legislature as opposed to through a ballot measure.

== Early life and career ==
Cassidy went to Manatee High School in Bradenton, Florida. From 1991 to 1993, she worked as the legislative director for the Chicago chapter of the National Organization for Women. From 1993 to 1997, she worked for state senate president John Cullerton, running his district office. In 1997, Cassidy joined the Cook County state's attorney's office, initially as a legislative liaison. In 2001, she became the director of programs and development for the state's attorney's office, a post she held until her appointment to the legislature in 2011. Cassidy served as a delegate to the 2012 Democratic National Convention.

== Illinois State Representative (2011–present) ==
Following state representative Harry Osterman's election as 48th ward alderman in February 2011, Cassidy was one of 23 candidates to seek appointment as his successor in the state house. The 14th district, which Osterman was vacating and Cassidy now represents, includes the neighborhoods of Edgewater, Andersonville, and Rogers Park. Per Illinois law, the vacancy was filled by Democratic committeemen from the wards making up the district, their votes weighted to reflect the share of the district falling in each ward. Because more than half of the 14th district's voters live in Chicago's 48th ward, that ward's committeeman – former state senator Carol Ronen – cast more than half of the votes. On April 17, the committeemen unanimously selected Cassidy to fill the vacancy.

In the 2012 Democratic primary, Cassidy was challenged by Paula Basta, a lesbian and longtime North Side activist. On March 20, 2012, Cassidy won the Democratic primary with 6,040 votes (62.4% of the vote) to Basta's 3,636 votes (37.6%).

In 2018, J. B. Pritzker appointed Cassidy to the gubernatorial transition's Restorative Justice and Safe Communities Committee.

In 2019, Cassidy was an advocate for the Reproductive Health Act, which repealed many restrictions on abortion.

As of July 3, 2022, Representative Cassidy is a member of the following Illinois House committees:

- Criminal Administration and Enforcement Subcommittee (HJUC-CAES)
- Firearms and Firearm Safety Subcommittee (HJUC-FIRE)
- Housing Committee (SHOU)
- Human Services Committee (HHSV)
- Judiciary - Criminal Committee (HJUC)
- Juvenile Justice and System-Involved Youth Subcommittee (HJUC-JJSI)
- Natural Gas Subcommittee (HPUB-NGAS)
- Prescription Drug Affordability Committee (HPDA)
- (Chairwoman of) Restorative Justice Committee (SHRJ)
- Sentencing, Penalties and Criminal Procedure Subcommittee (HJUC-SPCP)
- Sex Offenses and Sex Offender Registration Subcommittee (HJUC-SOSO)
- (Chairwoman of) Special Issues (HS) Subcommittee (HHSV-SPIS)

== Personal ==
Cassidy is openly lesbian. Her spouse is Candace Gingrich, who works as a lobbyist for an Illinois-based cannabis company following Cassidy's work to legalize cannabis.

She lives with her three sons on the North Side of Chicago. She is one of four openly LGBT members of the Illinois General Assembly, alongside Rep. Greg Harris and Lamont Robinson, both Chicago Democrats, and Sam Yingling, a Democrat from Round Lake Beach, Illinois, a northern suburb of Chicago.

== Other ==
In 2014, Cassidy was inducted into the Chicago Gay and Lesbian Hall of Fame.

In 2019, Cassidy was selected by the 49th ward Democratic Party to fill the role of 49th ward party committeeperson. The position became vacant after incumbent Joe Moore stepped down, following his defeat in the election for 49th ward alderman to Maria Hadden. Both Moore and Hadden supported Cassidy's selection as committeeperson.

In February 2021, State Sen. Heather Steans, who was re-elected just two months prior to represent a district covering Rogers Park, Edgewater, and Andersonville, resigned, having suddenly decided that “it's time for new faces and fresh energy.” A replacement in such a situation is picked by the district's committeepeople: an unpaid County-level position elected during presidential or gubernatorial primaries. Despite being the presumed front runner and endorsed by the outgoing State Senator, Cassidy lost the vote of committeemen to Rahm Emanuel's former policy director Mike Simmons. Community groups protested what was seen as an attempt by the State Representative Cassidy and Senator Steans to circumvent the normal election process as had been done several times previously in that district.

== Electoral history ==
Illinois 14th Representative District Democratic Primary, 2012
| Party | Candidate | Votes | % |
|---|---|---|---|
| Democratic | Kelly M. Cassidy (incumbent) | 6,163 | 62.28 |
| Democratic | Paula A. Basta | 3,732 | 37.72 |
| Total votes | | 9,895 | 100.0 |

Illinois 14th Representative District General Election, 2012
| Party | Candidate | Votes | % |
|---|---|---|---|
| Democratic | Kelly M. Cassidy (incumbent) | 32,777 | 99.95 |
| Write-in | | 18 | 0.05 |
| Total votes | | 32,795 | 100.0 |

Illinois 14th Representative District General Election, 2014
| Party | Candidate | Votes | % | ±% |
|---|---|---|---|---|
| Democratic | Kelly M. Cassidy (incumbent) | 23,456 | 87.02 | −12.93% |
| Republican | Denis Detzel | 3498 | 12.98 | N/A |
| Total votes | | 26,954 | 100.0 | |

Illinois 14th Representative District General Election, 2016
| Party | Candidate | Votes | % | ±% |
|---|---|---|---|---|
| Democratic | Kelly M. Cassidy (incumbent) | 35,989 | 83.22 | −3.80% |
| Independent | Arthur Noah Siegel | 7259 | 16.78 | N/A |
| Total votes | | 43,248 | 100.0 | |

Illinois 14th Representative District Democratic Primary, 2018
| Party | Candidate | Votes | % |
|---|---|---|---|
| Democratic | Kelly M. Cassidy (incumbent) | 16,609 | 85.94 |
| Democratic | Arthur Noah Siegel | 2,718 | 14.06 |
| Total votes | | 19,327 | 100.0 |

Illinois 14th Representative District General Election, 2018
| Party | Candidate | Votes | % | ±% |
|---|---|---|---|---|
| Democratic | Kelly M. Cassidy (incumbent) | 37,446 | 100.0 | +16.78% |
| Total votes | | 37,446 | 100.0 | |

Illinois 14th Representative District General Election, 2020
| Party | Candidate | Votes | % |
|---|---|---|---|
| Democratic | Kelly M. Cassidy (incumbent) | 41,907 | 100.0 |
| Total votes | | 41,907 | 100.0 |

Illinois 14th Representative District General Election, 2022
| Party | Candidate | Votes | % |
|---|---|---|---|
| Democratic | Kelly M. Cassidy (incumbent) | 29,635 | 100.0 |
| Total votes | | 29,635 | 100.0 |
