= Demuzio =

Demuzio is a surname. Notable people with the surname include:

- Deanna Demuzio (1943–2020), American politician, wife of Vince
- Vince Demuzio (1941–2004), American politician
