= Delia Ramirez =

American politician (born 1983)

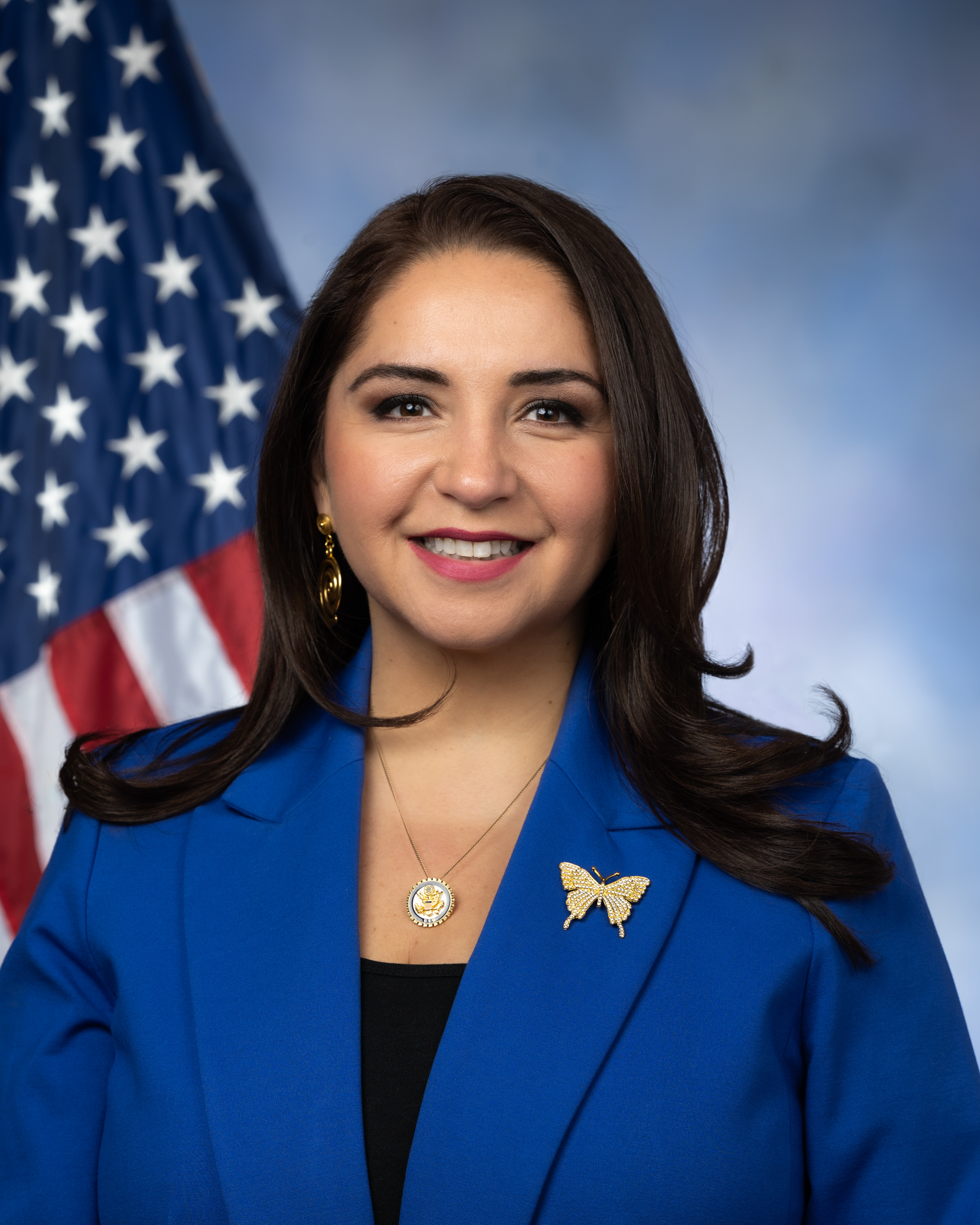
- Official portrait, 2025

Member of the U.S. House of Representatives from Illinois's 3rd district
- Incumbent
- Assumed office January 3, 2023
- Preceded by: Marie Newman (redistricted)

Member of the Illinois House of Representatives from the 4th district
- In office December 21, 2018 – December 14, 2022
- Preceded by: Cynthia Soto
- Succeeded by: Lilian Jiménez

Personal details
- Born: Delia Catalina Ramirez; June 2, 1983 (age 43) Chicago, Illinois, U.S.
- Party: Democratic
- Other political affiliations: Working Families
- Spouse: Boris Hernandez
- Education: Northeastern Illinois University (BA)
- Website: House website Campaign website
- Ramirez's voice Ramirez on G.I. benefits. Recorded March 24, 2023

Delia Catalina Ramirez (born June 2, 1983) is an American politician serving as the U.S. representative for Illinois's 3rd congressional district since 2023. She is a member of the Democratic Party.

Before her election to Congress, Ramirez served in the Illinois House of Representatives for the 4th District from 2018 to 2023. The 4th District includes the Chicago neighborhoods of East Humboldt Park, Hermosa, Bucktown, West Town, Ukrainian Village, East Village, and Logan Square. Ramirez was elected in 2018 and re-elected in 2020. She was the first American of Guatemalan descent elected to the Illinois General Assembly.

In 2022, Ramirez was elected to the U.S. House of Representatives in Illinois's 3rd congressional district.

== Early life and education ==
The daughter of immigrants from Chiquimula Department, Guatemala, Ramirez was born in Chicago and raised in the Humboldt Park neighborhood. She attended Sabin Magnet Elementary School and graduated from St. Gregory High School located in Chicago's Edgewater neighborhood. She earned a Bachelor of Arts in justice studies from Northeastern Illinois University.

== Early political and advocacy career ==
Before entering elected office, Ramirez worked in and led social service agencies, nonprofit advocacy organizations, and local community organizations. She was president of the Logan Square Neighborhood Association from 2005 to 2007, executive director of the homelessness-focused nonprofit Center for Changing Lives from 2004 to 2013, and president of the Latin United Community Housing Association (LUCHA) from 2016 to 2019.

In the 2018 Illinois House election, she ran for the open 4th District seat to succeed the incumbent Cynthia Soto. Her campaign focused on areas of concern such as stable housing and stable schools, reliable and responsible government, as well as public safety and justice reform. She was part of a slate of Latino candidates backed by then-Cook County Commissioner and congressional candidate Chuy García. She was also endorsed by several local elected officials, labor unions, and progressive organizations, including U.S. Representative Luis Gutiérrez, aldermen Carlos Ramirez-Rosa and Roberto Maldonado, the Chicago Teachers Union, the Illinois AFL-CIO, SEIU Healthcare and Local 73, United Working Families, and Our Revolution Illinois. Ramirez won a four-way Democratic primary election on March 20 with 48% of the vote, and she ran unopposed in the general election on November 6, 2018.

== Illinois House of Representatives (2018-2022) ==
After the 2018 general election, retiring incumbent Cynthia Soto resigned effective December 18, 2018. Ramirez was officially appointed by local Democratic leaders and sworn into office on December 21, 2018. After serving the remainder of the 100th General Assembly, she was sworn into the 101st General Assembly on January 9, 2019. She was a member of the Illinois House of Representatives Progressive Caucus.

=== Committees ===
As of July 2022, Ramirez was a member of the following committees:

- Adoption and Child Welfare Committee
- Appropriations - Human Services Committee
- Elementary and Secondary Education: Administration, Licensing & Charter Schools
- Executive Committee
- Housing Committee
- Judiciary – Criminal Committee
- Medicaid and Managed Care Subcommittee

=== Tenure ===
In October 2019, Ramirez was part of a group of Democratic state legislators who opposed Chicago mayor Lori Lightfoot's proposed plan for the use of a new real estate transfer tax, arguing that a portion of the funds from the new tax should be explicitly set aside to address homelessness and affordable housing. In early 2020, Ramirez chaired a task force in the state legislature focused on the condition of children of incarcerated people.

During the COVID-19 pandemic, Ramirez sponsored legislation to establish a temporary moratorium on rent and mortgage payments and strengthen eviction moratoriums, but the bill was defeated after strong opposition from real estate agents. However, she was able to persuade lawmakers to increase the size of a relief fund for tenants and landlords in the 2021 budget bill passed during the pandemic by 90%. She also led a successful effort to include a provision that would provide Medicaid benefits to undocumented seniors in the budget bill. Ramirez had been advocating for such a provision since 2019, and its successful adoption made Illinois the first state to provide Medicaid regardless of immigration status.

In the 2021–22 session, Ramirez was named vice-chair of the newly created Housing Committee in the House and introduced new legislation to address housing issues related to the COVID-19 pandemic. A version of this legislation was passed and signed into law in May 2021 as the COVID-19 Emergency Housing Act, including provisions that created guidelines for administering $1 billion in federal funds for rent relief from the American Rescue Plan Act of 2021, automatically sealing evictions filed during the pandemic, extending a statewide eviction moratorium until May, and pausing judicial sales of possession until July.

== U.S. House of Representatives (2023-present) ==
=== Elections ===
==== 2022 ====
On December 7, 2021, Ramirez announced that she would run in the 2022 U.S. House election for Illinois's 3rd congressional district. The district was an open seat due to redistricting after the 2020 U.S. census. In the Democratic primary election, she won 66% of the vote, defeating Gilbert Villegas, a member of the Chicago City Council, and Iymen Chehade, a professor and foreign policy advisor. The district's electorate is heavily Democratic, and as such, the Democratic nominee was widely expected to win the general election in November.

Ramirez defeated Republican nominee Justin Burau in the general election, receiving 68.5% of the vote.

==== 2024 ====
Ramirez ran unopposed in the Democratic primary. She defeated Republican John Booras in the general election.

=== Tenure ===
Allegiance to Guatemala

In August of 2025, while speaking at the Panamerican Congress in Mexico City, Ramirez stated in Spanish that she considered herself a “proud Guatemalan before I am an American.”

These remarks drew backlash from other House members, including a Resolution of condemnation introduced by Congressman Buddy Carter and a Resolution introduced by Congressman Carlos Gimenez to remove Ramirez from her position on the Homeland Security Committee. Neither resolution was brought to a vote.

==== Immigration ====
In January 2026, Ramirez and Yvette Clarke introduced the Melt ICE Act, which would end funding to the DHS to detain or monitor immigrants.

==== Foreign policy ====
===== Syria =====
In 2023, Ramirez was among 56 Democrats to vote in favor of H.Con.Res. 21, which directed President Joe Biden to remove U.S. troops from Syria within 180 days.

===== Israel and Palestine =====
On July 18, 2023, she voted against a resolution that states that Congress rejects "all forms of antisemitism and xenophobia", that "the United States will always be a staunch partner and supporter of Israel", and that "the State of Israel is not a racist or apartheid state". In a statement, Ramirez said, "The threat of antisemitism is real, it is deadly, and I wholly condemn it in the strongest terms... I believe we need to continue to work towards a world where the full humanity and rights of all Israelis and Palestinians are honored. This resolution does not do that, and therefore, I could not support it." Eight other members joined her in voting against the resolution, all Democrats: Alexandria Ocasio-Cortez, Jamaal Bowman, Cori Bush, André Carson, Summer Lee, Ilhan Omar, Ayanna Pressley, and Rashida Tlaib.

On October 25, 2023, Ramirez and eight other Democrats (Alexandria Ocasio-Cortez, Jamaal Bowman, Cori Bush, André Carson, Al Green, Summer Lee, Ilhan Omar, and Rashida Tlaib), along with Republican Thomas Massie, voted against congressional bi-partisan non-binding resolution H. Res. 771 supporting Israel in the wake of the 2023 Hamas attack on Israel. The resolution stated that the House of Representatives: "stands with Israel as it defends itself against the barbaric war launched by Hamas and other terrorists" and "reaffirms the United States' commitment to Israel's security"; the resolution passed by an overwhelming 412–10–6 margin.

=== Committee assignments ===
For the 119th Congress:

- Committee on Homeland Security
  - Subcommittee on Border Security and Enforcement
  - Subcommittee on Oversight, Investigations, and Accountability
- Committee on Veterans' Affairs
  - Subcommittee on Economic Opportunity
  - Subcommittee on Oversight and Investigations (Ranking Member)

=== Caucus memberships ===
- Black Maternal Health Caucus
- Congressional Hispanic Caucus
- Congressional Equality Caucus
- Congressional Progressive Caucus
- Congressional Caucus for the Equal Rights Amendment
- Congressional Ukraine Caucus
- Congressional Freethought Caucus

== Personal life ==
In October 2020, Delia Ramirez married Boris Hernandez. Hernandez is a DACA recipient.

Ramirez is the first United Methodist Latina in Congress. She has said: "In this church, my parents have shown me and my siblings that being a Christian is much more than words and certainly much more than participating on Sundays. Being a Christian is a way of living, a way of treating people, and the way we show the light of God through our actions."

== Electoral history ==
Illinois 4th Representative District Democratic Primary, 2018
Party	Candidate	Votes	%
Democratic	Delia Ramirez	7,120	47.99
Democratic	Iris J. Millan	3,076	20.73
Democratic	Alyx S. Pattison	2,346	15.81
Democratic	Anne Shaw	2,294	15.46
Total votes		14,836	100.0

Illinois 4th Representative District General Election, 2018
Party	Candidate	Votes	%
Democratic	Delia Ramirez	31,797	99.98
Write-in		6	0.02
Total votes		31,803	100.0

Illinois 4th Representative District Democratic Primary, 2020
Party	Candidate	Votes	%
Democratic	Delia C. Ramirez (incumbent)	16,136	100.0
Total votes		16,136	100.0

Illinois 4th Representative District General Election, 2020
Party	Candidate	Votes	%
Democratic	Delia C. Ramirez (incumbent)	38,951	100.0
Total votes		38,951	100.0

Illinois 3rd Congressional District Democratic Primary, 2022
Party	Candidate	Votes	%
Democratic	Delia Ramirez	37,296	66.39
Democratic	Gilbert Villegas	12,990	23.12
Democratic	Iymen Chehade	3,719	6.62
Democratic	Juan Aguirre	2,175	3.87
Total votes		56,180	100.0

2022 Illinois's 3rd congressional district election
Party	Candidate	Votes	%
Democratic	Delia Ramirez	121,764	68.5
Republican	Justin Burau	55,995	31.5
Total votes		177,759	100.0

2024 Illinois's 3rd congressional district election
Party	Candidate	Votes	%
Democratic	Delia Ramirez (incumbent)	174,825	67.3
Republican	John Booras	84,987	32.7
Write-in		96	0.0
Total votes		259,908	100.0

== See also ==
- List of Hispanic and Latino Americans in the United States Congress

U.S. House of Representatives
Preceded by Marie Newman	Member of the U.S. House of Representatives from Illinois's 3rd congressional district 2023–present	Incumbent
U.S. order of precedence (ceremonial)
Preceded by Brittany Pettersen	United States representatives by seniority 344th	Succeeded by Andrea Salinas
