= Jeffrey Schoenberg =

American politician

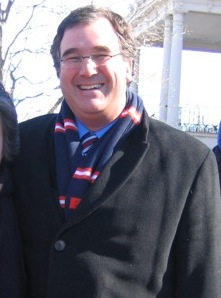

Member of the Illinois Senate from the 9th district
- In office January 8, 2003 – January 9, 2013
- Preceded by: Carol Ronen (redistricted)
- Succeeded by: Daniel Biss

Member of the Illinois House of Representatives for the 58th district 56th district (1991-1993)
- In office January 9, 1991 – January 10, 2003
- Preceded by: Calvin Sutker
- Succeeded by: Karen May (redistricted)

Personal details
- Born: July 28, 1959 (age 66) Chicago, Illinois, U.S.
- Party: Democratic
- Spouse: Lynne Sered
- Profession: Attorney

Jeffrey Schoenberg is an American politician. He is a former Democratic member of the Illinois Senate, representing the 9th district from 2003 to 2013. He earlier served for six terms in the Illinois House of Representatives, first elected to that position in 1990. Schoenberg retired from the Senate after the 2012 elections to pursue work in philanthropy.

== Senate career ==
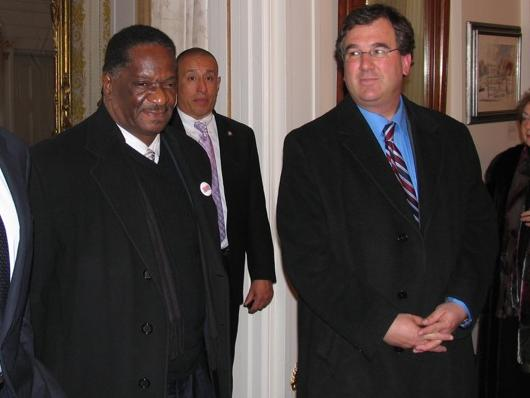
Emil Jones (left) and Schoenberg (right) at the Illinois Executive Mansion for a luncheon

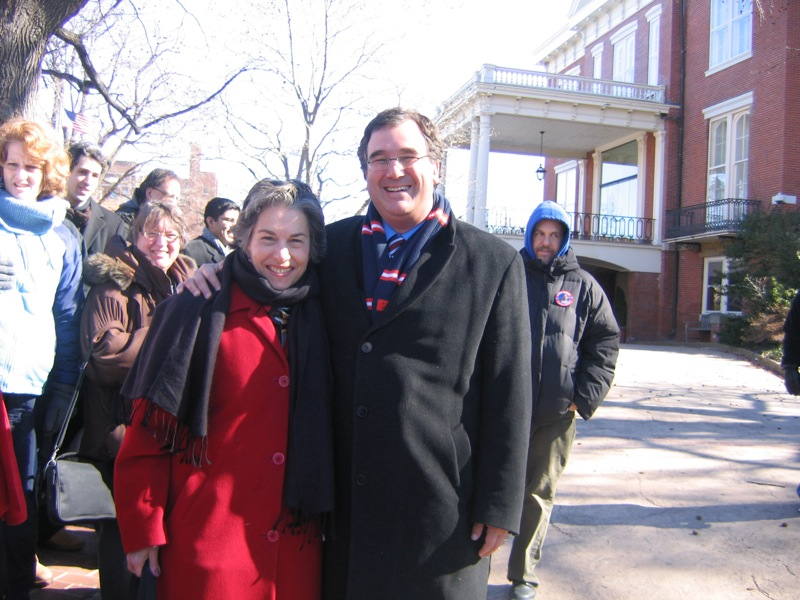
Jan Schakowsky and Schoenberg

As a state senator, Schoenberg sponsored and supported many diverse bills, including bills concerned with inefficient government spending and the state’s procurement code.

Schoenberg pushed for legislation that would crack down on state employees who change careers to companies that are regulated or awarded contracts by the agencies those state workers were employed by.

He also sponsored the Managed Care Patients Rights Act, legislation which would provide consumers with greater information about their health maintenance organizations and better access to quality health care. Schoenberg has been a longtime supporter of abortion rights. He supported the Illinois Safe Choice Zones Act, which would establish a state criminal offense with possible civil penalties for anyone who interferes with an individual entering or leaving abortion clinics, hospitals and other medical facilities.

Schoenberg worked for stronger accountability and oversight standards at the Illinois Highway Authority.

Schoenberg supported HB 656, a $226 million tax increase, which raised the Cook County sales tax by 0.25%. He was also the co-sponsor of SB 790, which raided $530 million from various Illinois trust funds (including the Local Government Health Insurance fund, the Sex Offender Registration Fund, and the Banking Regulation Fund) to spend on new programs.

Schoenberg voted for SB 241, a bill which gave state constitutional officers and legislators, including himself, a 9.6% pay increase, along with a standard 3.8% increase that year, for a total of a 13.4% pay increase in 2007.

Schoenberg served as the Chairman of the Appropriations II Committee, the Vice Chairman of the Appropriations I Committee, and a member of the Appropriations III, Health and Human Services, and Financial Institutions Committees.

== Personal life ==
Schoenberg lives in Evanston with his wife and their two children, Nadav and Michal.

Schoenberg's wife, Lynne Sered, is chair of the Illinois Education Labor Relations Board. He is Jewish.
