= Mary Ann Smith =

American politician

Member of Chicago City Council for the 48th ward
- In office 1989–2011
- Preceded by: Kathy Osterman
- Succeeded by: Harry Osterman

Personal details
- Born: Mary Ann Smith; November 2, 1946 Chicago, Illinois, U.S.
- Died: July 31, 2024 (aged 77) Chicago, Illinois, U.S.
- Spouse: Ronald C. Smith
- Children: 2
- Education: Mundelein College

Mary Ann Smith (November 2, 1946 – July 31, 2024) was an alderman of the 48th ward of the City of Chicago; she was appointed in 1989 by Mayor Richard M. Daley to replace Kathy Osterman. She won re-election in 1991, and was re-elected four more times before retiring in 2011. She served as a member of the Chicago Commission on Landmarks.

== Early life ==
Smith attended the now-defunct College of Saint Teresa from 1964 until 1967, and later earned a bachelor's degree from Mundelein College, now a part of Loyola University Chicago, as an undergraduate student. She and her husband lived in the Chicago neighborhoods Edgewater and Uptown beginning in 1974. Her engagement with ward politics began with her involvement in the Independent Voters of Illinois-Independent Precinct Organization (IVI-IPO), during which time she worked with activists Marion Volini and Kathy Osterman, who would both become alderwomen of the 48th ward.

== Aldermanic career ==
Smith became a Chicago alderman in 1989, being appointed by Mayor Richard M. Daley. She was reelected in 1991, 1995, 1999, 2003, and 2007. In 2010, she announced that she would not be seeking reelection in 2011, thus ending her tenure as alderman.

Smith earned a United Nations Programme Award for Citizen Action to Protect the Global Environment. She worked with the Chicago Park District to restructure their department and provide more recreational access to all Chicagoans. Smith is on the Advisory Council on Chicago Green Development.

In 2000, Smith helped organize the funding for Walkable Edgewater. Smith earned an award from the Chicago Civic Federation and a Soles and Spokes award from the Chicago Area Transportation Study.

Smith was an early supporter of the Human Rights Ordinance and the Domestic Partner Ordinance.

In 2005 Smith was instrumental in the controversial decision to open Rickover Naval Academy in the facilities of Senn High School. This decision met with intense opposition from residents and anti-war activists concerned about military recruitment of the community's poor.

Smith worked with People for the Ethical Treatment of Animals (PETA) to draft the proposed Elephant Protection Ordinance, which if adopted would mandate humane treatment of elephants within the city. After two unsuccessful attempts at passage, Smith on December 16, 2009, for the third time introduced the ordinance.

In 2007 Smith ran unopposed for re-election to a fifth term after Smith got two of her supporters, Susanne J. Henning and Albert L. Lewis, to file with the Chicago Board of Elections objections to her opponent's nominating paperwork.

Smith was one of the top three alderman lagging in spending so-called "aldermanic menu" funds, which allows aldermen to choose from a menu of street, sidewalk, alley and anti-crime improvements.

Smith appeared in the documentary Uptown: Portrait of a Palace about Chicago's Uptown Theatre.

On July 2, 2010, in response to the overturning of the Chicago handgun ban by the Supreme Court, she said "that law was written for militias and, "they guaranteed the right to carry around muskets not Uzis."

== Honors ==
Smith earned a United Nations Programme Award for Citizen Action to Protect the Global Environment, an award from the Chicago Civic Federation, and a Soles and Spokes award from the Chicago Area Transportation Study.

In 1997 Smith was inducted into the Chicago Gay and Lesbian Hall of Fame as a Friend of the Community.

== Personal life ==
Smith's husband, Ronald C. Smith, was a professor at John Marshall Law School. He died in 2018. They have two sons, Michael Smith, a Portland, OR based Democratic delegate and Matthew Smith, a Chicago-area psychotherapist.
