= Larry Leonard =

American radio director and politician

James Patrick "Larry" Leonard, Jr. (August 18, 1934 – July 4, 2002) was an American radio director and politician.

Born in Davenport, Iowa, Leonard went to University of Iowa and John Marshall Law School in Chicago, Illinois. Leonard served in the United States Army from 1957 to 1959 and was with the Armed Forces Radio Network in Japan. He lived in Waukegan, Illinois and was the public affairs director for WKRS radio. Leonard served in the Illinois Senate, as a Democrat from 1977 to 1979. Leonard lost his election bid to Adeline Geo-Karis. He died in Waukegan, Illinois.
