= Beyond the Beltway =

American radio syndicated political talk show from 1980 to 2025

- Genre: political talk
- Running time: 2 hours
- Country of origin: United States
- Language: English
- Home station: WIND
- TV adaptations: Beyond the Beltway (Total Living Network)
- Created by: Bruce DuMont
- Original release: June 26, 1980 – January 19, 2025
- Website: www.beyondthebeltway.com

Beyond the Beltway was a nationally syndicated radio political talk show based in Chicago that debuted on WBEZ 91.5 FM on June 26, 1980, as Inside Politics. It was airing on Sundays on 14 terrestrial radio stations as well as online at beyondthebeltway.com and on the show's YouTube channel and Facebook page when it ended production in January 2025. In February 2015, Beyond the Beltway was removed from the lineup of Chicago's 50,000-watt WLS 890 AM, the show's flagship station since November 1992, and picked up by WCGO 1590 AM, a 10,000-watt station based out of Evanston, Illinois. In July 2021, WIND 560 AM, a 5,000-watt station headquartered in Elk Grove Village, Illinois, became the show's newest flagship station (although Beltway didn't air until 10 PM CST on WIND despite being recorded live four hours earlier) after WCGO dropped Beltway from its schedule. On October 30, 2022, host Bruce DuMont announced that he was taking an "indefinite hiatus" from the show due to health issues; longtime guests Jeanne Ives and Eric Kohn took over as the new hosts of Beltway in November. However, DuMont returned just three and a half months later, on February 19, 2023. On January 10, 2025, Radio Ink's website reported that Beyond the Beltway would air its final installment on January 19 because of DuMont's "health challenges." DuMont died September 10 of that year.

The show was videotaped live at the Museum of Broadcast Communications, which DuMont founded in 1987, until 2020, when its base of operations moved to WCGO's studio (and DuMont's residence after he contracted COVID-19 in the fall of 2020), then WIND's studio in July 2021, and was shown from 1 to 2 AM Central on Monday nights on Total Living Network in the Chicago area from March 2022 until January 2025; the televised version of Beltway was also broadcast in a half-hour format on WYCC, Chicago's secondary PBS station, on Sunday nights from 1996 until the station went off the air in 2017, and a one-hour version aired at various times throughout the week on CN100 in the Chicago area until early 2022. (In October 2010, DuMont temporarily changed the title of the televised version to Inside Politics, which had been the radio show's title for its first 14 years on the air.) Beyond the Beltway made headlines in March 2012 when DuMont challenged Republican presidential candidate Rick Santorum for criticizing President Obama's stance on prosecuting child pornographers.

Beltway began airing on Sirius XM Satellite Radio (POTUS Channel 124) in September 2007. On November 29, 2018, DuMont launched a GoFundMe campaign "to purchase satellite radio services" for the show; he set a goal of $8,000 and eight months later had raised more than $3,100. Then in December 2019 DuMont changed the goal to $10,000; by October of the following year, he had raised $8,700. However, in December 2020 media blogger Robert Feder reported that DuMont had "signed a new satellite distribution deal with Salem Radio Network, effective January 3."
