= Kathy Osterman =

American politician

Member of Chicago City Council for the 48th ward
- In office 1987–1989
- Preceded by: Marion Volini
- Succeeded by: Mary Ann Smith

Personal details
- Born: Kathleen Mary Lonergan; July 22, 1943 New York City, New York, U.S.
- Died: December 8, 1992 (aged 49) Chicago, Illinois, U.S.
- Party: Democratic
- Spouse(s): Harry Osterman (divorced); Bruce DuMont (1992)
- Children: 2, including Harry
- Education: Prairie State College

Kathy Osterman (July 22, 1943 – December 8, 1992) was an American politician and civic leader in Chicago, Illinois. Born Kathleen Mary Lonergan in the Bronx, New York, she was known for her contributions as alderman of the 48th Ward, and her work as Director of the Mayor's Office of Special Events under Richard M. Daley. Osterman's career was characterized by her advocacy for the LGBTQ community, efforts in urban restoration and development, and leadership in organizing events and festivals in Chicago.

== Early life and career ==
Raised by Irish-Catholic family in the Bronx, Osterman moved to Montreal at age 10 before settling in Park Forest at age 16, where Osterman graduated from Prairie State College before relocating to the Edgewater area after her marriage to Harry Osterman. She worked as a bank teller before entering local politics as president of the E.P.I.C. (Every Person Is Concerned) block club. In 1981 Osterman became a community relations director for then-State's Attorney Richard M. Daley, who became an important political patron for Osterman throughout her career.

In the early 1980s, Osterman co-founded Operation Lakewatch with Mary Ann Smith, an initiative to combat illegal dumping in Lake Michigan and to protect the lake's water quality by enlisting the help of local fishermen and boaters. Volunteers were tasked with collecting water samples and reporting any pollution they witnessed.

=== Aldermanic career ===
In 1987 Osterman emerged victorious from an eleven-person race in which Mayor Harold Washington declined to endorse any candidate, and was elected alderman of the lakefront 48th Ward, which at that time consisted primarily of the Edgewater community as well as parts of Uptown. Initially a part of the Washington bloc in Council Wars, she switched to the largely white bloc immediately following Washington's death and during the tenure of Eugene Sawyer. She served on numerous City Council committees, including the Human Rights Committee, where she forged strong links with the ward's significant gay community. Only two years into her term, Osterman retired in 1989, facilitating Daley's appointment of Mary Ann Smith as alderman. Osterman subsequently was appointed Director of the Mayor's Office of Special Events.

During her brief tenure, Osterman worked on the rehabilitation of the Broadway Armory and the restoration of two vintage mansions in Berger Park along Sheridan Road, as public facilities. She lobbied vigorously for passage of Chicago's Human Rights Ordinance in 1988.

Osterman received criticism as alderman for defying the Illinois Open Meetings Act and failing to elicit the opinions of her constituents, as well as receiving a majority of her campaign funds from then-State's Attorney Richard M. Daley and the 11th Ward organization. In 1987, fellow alderman Helen Shiller succeeded in denying the Uptown Chicago Commission a $20,000 grant recommended by Osterman for residents applying for home improvement loans, accusing the Commission of helping developers displace low-income Uptown residents.

==== Director of the Mayor's Office of Special Events ====
As Director of the Mayor's Office of Special Events from 1989 until her death, Osterman was responsible for coordinating the city's major music festivals, neighborhood festivals, and the Taste of Chicago. In 1990 she co-authored the Taste of Chicago Cookbook with Mayor Richard M. Daley, a collection of recipes from popular local restaurants.

== Personal life ==
On May 1, 1992, Osterman married radio political commentator Bruce DuMont. Later that year she died of ovarian cancer. From 2011 to 2023, Osterman's son Harry served as alderman of the 48th Ward, succeeding Mary Ann Smith.

== Legacy ==
As a result of Osterman's efforts in passing the Chicago Human Rights Ordinance in 1988, Osterman was inducted into the Chicago Gay and Lesbian Hall of Fame as a Friend of the Community in 1993.

On July 22, 1993, Ardmore Beach in the Edgewater neighborhood was renamed Kathy Osterman Beach. In addition to the renamed signage on the beach pavilion, a memorial plaque was erected.

In 2021, Mayor Lori Lightfoot announced the return of the Kathy Osterman Awards, an annual ceremony which honors outstanding city employees across various departments. The awards were discontinued in 2014 under Mayor Rahm Emanuel.
