= Lilian Jiménez =

American politician

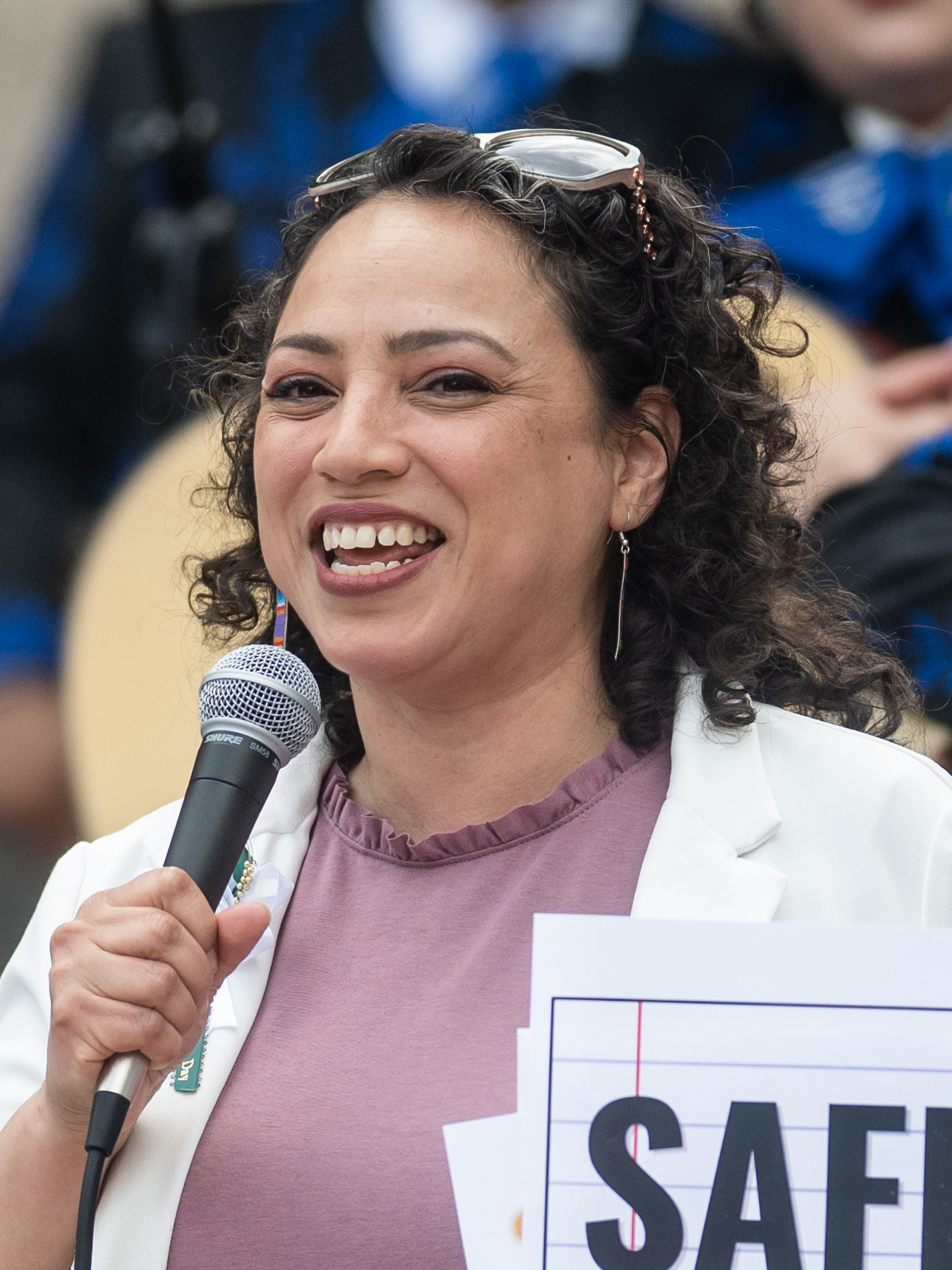
- Jiménez in 2025

Member of the Illinois House of Representatives from the 4th district
- Incumbent
- Assumed office December 15, 2022
- Preceded by: Delia Ramirez

Personal details
- Born: Chicago, Illinois, U.S.
- Party: Democratic
- Education: DePaul University (BA, JD)

Lilian Jiménez is an American attorney and politician serving as a member of the Illinois House of Representatives for the 4th district. Elected in November 2022, she assumed office on December 15, 2022.

== Early life and education ==
Jiménez was born and raised in Chicago by an undocumented mother from Mexico who was a grassroots community leader and a father who migrated from rural Puerto Rico in search of manufacturing work. She earned a Bachelor of Arts degree in political science from DePaul University and a Juris Doctor from the DePaul University College of Law.

== Career ==
From 2000 to 2003, Jiménez worked as the education coordinator for Workers United. She worked as a community organizer for the Erie Neighborhood House and as a citizenship coordinator for the Association House of Chicago. From 2006 to 2008, Jiménez worked as a paralegal for the Mexican American Legal Defense and Educational Fund. From 2009 to 2011, she served as a civil rights investigator in the United States Department of Health and Human Services. Jiménez worked as the national legal coordinator for the Restaurant Opportunities Center before joining the Fair Labor Standards Division of the Illinois Department of Labor in 2012. From 2015 to 2017, she served on Chuy García's staff during his tenure on the Cook County Board of Commissioners. From 2019 to 2022, Jiménez served as the administrator of the Office of Immigrant & Refugee Services in the Illinois Department of Human Services.

== Illinois House of Representatives ==
Jiménez was elected to the Illinois House of Representatives to succeed Delia Ramirez who was elected to the United States House of Representatives. Ramirez resigned December 14, 2022. To fill the vacancy, the Democratic Representative Committee of the 4th Representative District appointed Representative-elect Jiménez to serve in the remainder of the 102nd General Assembly.

== Electoral history ==
Illinois' 4th Representative District Democratic Primary, 2022
Party	Candidate	Votes	%
Democratic	Lilian Jiménez	6,426	78.31
Democratic	Manuel Jimenez, Jr.	1,104	13.45
Democratic	Hector Villafuerte	676	8.24
Total votes		8,206	100.0

Illinois' 4th Representative District General Election, 2022
Party	Candidate	Votes	%
Democratic	Lilian Jiménez	19,111	88.23
Republican	JD Sloat	2,549	11.77
Total votes		21,660	100.0
