= Adeline Geo-Karis =

Greek American politician

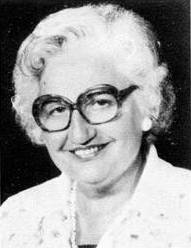
- Official portrait, c. 1981

Member of the Illinois Senate from the 31st district
- In office January 1979 – January 2007
- Preceded by: Larry Leonard
- Succeeded by: Michael Bond

Member of the Illinois House of Representatives
- In office 1973–1979

Personal details
- Born: Antigone Geokaris; March 29, 1918 Tegeas, Greece
- Died: February 10, 2008 (aged 89) Glenview, Illinois, US
- Party: Republican
- Education: Northwestern University (B.S.); DePaul University (J.D.)
- Profession: Attorney; Politician

Military service
- Allegiance: United States
- Branch/service: United States Naval Reserve
- Rank: Lieutenant commander

Adeline Jay Geo-Karis (March 29, 1918 – February 10, 2008) was a Greek American politician and naval officer who was a member of the Illinois Senate for the 31st District from 1979 to 2007. A member of the Republican Party, she was a member of the Illinois House of Representatives from 1973 to 1979. Known simply as "Geo" to her constituents, she was a popular politician in Lake County, Illinois for many years. Known for her no-nonsense attitude and her ability to work across party lines, she also served for a time as Mayor of Zion.

== Life ==
Born in Greece, Geo-Karis came to America at the age of four with her parents. She attended Northwestern University and the DePaul University College of Law. She rose to the rank Lt. Commander in the United States Naval Reserves before retiring with a top secret security clearance. She also served as a Justice of the Peace and later as an assistant state's attorney in Lake County.

Due to an inter-party feud which included Republican Susan Simpson challenging Geo-Karis after she had told her she wanted to stay on for one more term, Geo-Karis endorsed Democrat Michael Bond to replace her. Bond's election, in a historically Republican district, was one of the many Democratic victories in 2006 that gave the Democratic Party a super-majority in the State Senate. Geo-Karis finished her final term in the 94th General Assembly where she served as the Executive Appointments Co-Chairperson. She also served on the Senate Committee of the Whole and the Pensions & Investments committees. Geo-Karis was also an avid supporter of Saint Demitrios Greek Orthodox Church, and was a member there for over fifty years.

== Death and legacy ==
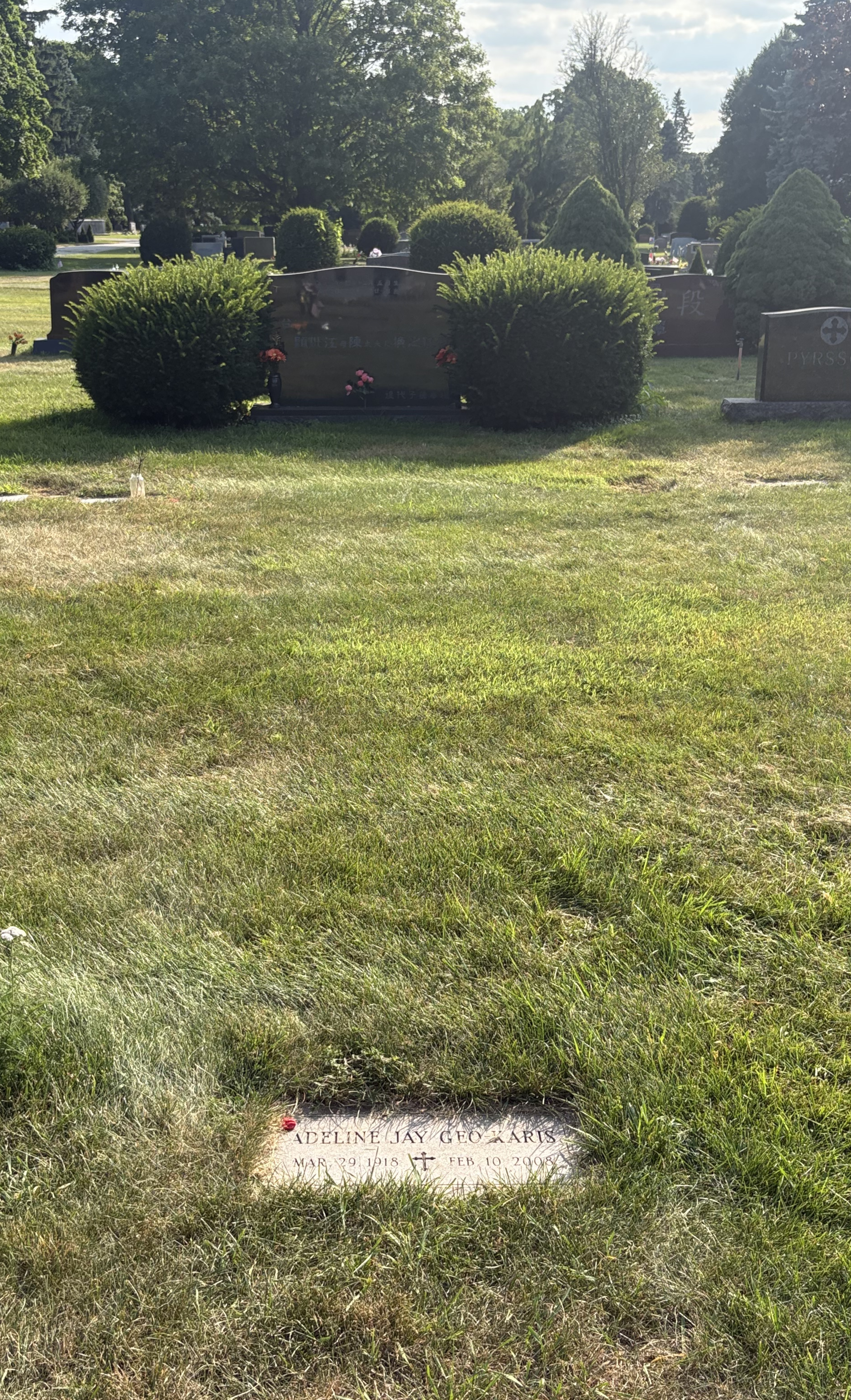
Geo-Karis's grave at Memorial Park Cemetery

She died on February 10, 2008, aged 89, of natural causes, at Glenbrook Hospital in Glenview, Illinois. She was buried at Memorial Park Cemetery in Skokie.

The Adeline Jay Geo-Karis Illinois Beach State Park in Zion is named for her.

Party political offices
Preceded by Calvin Skinner	Republican nominee for Illinois Comptroller; 1986	Succeeded by Sue Suter
