= Gary LaPaille =

American politician (1954–2022)

Member of the Illinois Senate from the 11th district
- In office January 1993 – January 1995
- Preceded by: Frank Savickas
- Succeeded by: Louis Viverito

Chair of the Democratic Party of Illinois
- In office April 1990 – April 1998
- Preceded by: Vince Demuzio
- Succeeded by: Michael Madigan

Personal details
- Born: March 14, 1954 Chicago, Illinois, U.S.
- Died: December 1, 2022 (aged 68) Potomac, Maryland, U.S.
- Party: Democratic
- Spouse: Christine
- Children: Three Children
- Education: Loyola University
- Profession: Politician; Lobbyist

Gary J. LaPaille (March 14, 1954 – December 1, 2022) was an American politician and businessman.

Born in Chicago, Illinois, LaPaille graduated from Loyola University Chicago with a degree in business. He would get his start by being employed in former Illinois House Speaker Michael Madigan's ward office, later becoming Madigan's chief of staff. LaPaille was chairman of the Illinois Democratic Party 1990–1998. In 1990, Crain's Chicago Business named him as one of their 40 Under 40 individuals who were prominent in business and/or government. He served as a Democratic member of the Illinois State Senate 1993–1994. During his time in the Senate, he was the minority spokesman on the Local Government & Elections Committee. His other committee assignments included The Committee on Agriculture & Conservation and the Committee on Financial Institutions. He was also the Managing Director of Chestnut Hill Partners; an executive search firm.

LaPaille was president of mCapitol Management, Inc, a business and political consulting business. LaPaille died from complications of amyotrophic lateral sclerosis (ALS) on December 1, 2022, at the age of 68.
