= Steve McClure (politician) =

American politician

- McClure visits Camp Lincoln in 2026

Member of the Illinois Senate from the 54th district
- Incumbent
- Assumed office January 9, 2019
- Preceded by: Sam McCann

Personal details
- Born: March 8, 1984 (age 42)
- Party: Republican
- Education: Arizona State University (B.A); University of Illinois (M.A.); Valparaiso University (J.D.)
- Profession: Attorney
- Website: https://senatormcclure.com

Steve McClure (born March 8, 1984) is an American Republican politician who is currently a member of the Illinois Senate. He represents the 54th district and serves as the Floor Leader and as an Assistant Leader for the Senate Republican Caucus. The 54th district, located in Central Illinois, includes all or parts of Christian, Cumberland, Effingham, Macon, Macoupin, Menard, Montgomery, Moultrie, Sangamon, and Shelby counties.

Before his election to the Illinois State Senate, McClure was a prosecutor for nearly six years in the Sangamon County State's Attorney's Office in Springfield, Illinois, where he was chief of the Juvenile Division, and later served in the Felony Division.

== Early life and education ==
McClure was born on March 8, 1984, in Springfield, Illinois. His father, Steve McClure Sr., was Director of Commerce for the state of Illinois under Governor James R. Thompson and his mother, Tammy McClure, was the Director of Personnel for Governor Jim Edgar when he was Illinois Secretary of State. He has an older sister, Katie, and a younger brother, Matt. McClure went to Springfield High School where he was co-captain of the wrestling team, and had a record of 26-4 as a senior. He graduated from Arizona State University with degrees in political science and history, and was vice chair of the Arizona College Republicans.

After college, McClure worked on the Illinois Senate Republican appropriations staff. While working for the Senate Republicans, he earned a master's degree in political studies from the University of Illinois at Springfield. He went on to attend Valparaiso University School of Law where he graduated with a Juris Doctor and served as president of the Valparaiso Law School Republicans. After law school, McClure served as a prosecutor for nearly six years in the Sangamon County State's Attorney's Office in Springfield, Illinois where he was chief of the Juvenile Division, and later served in the Felony Division.

== Elections ==
=== 2018 ===
In August 2017, the Sangamon County Republicans endorsed McClure for Illinois Senate in the 50th district for the 2018 Republican primary, instead of incumbent state Senator Sam McCann. This was a change from the previous Republican primary, when the Sangamon County Republicans supported Sam McCann. In that 2016 election, McCann won a primary by just over five points despite being opposed by sitting Republican Governor Bruce Rauner. The 50th district, located in Central Illinois, included all of Calhoun, Greene, Morgan, Pike, and Scott counties as well as portions of Macoupin, Madison, Jersey, and Sangamon counties.

In September 2017, McClure resigned his position as an assistant state's attorney and officially launched his campaign. In December 2017, Senator McCann announced that he would not seek reelection as a Republican. McClure then won the Republican nomination without opposition. In April 2018, Sam McCann announced his candidacy for governor as a third-party candidate. McClure was elected to the state senate without opposition in the general election. In February 2021, Sam McCann was indicted by a federal grand jury for charges related to his alleged misuse of campaign money for personal expenses.

=== 2022 ===
In October 2021, McClure announced his candidacy for reelection in the newly drawn 54th Legislative District, which was mostly new territory for him. The 54th district contains all or parts of Christian, Cumberland, Effingham, Macon, Macoupin, Menard, Montgomery, Sangamon, and Shelby counties. McClure was challenged in the Republican primary by Donald Debolt, who spent $200,000 of his own money on the campaign. Additionally, Debolt was endorsed by state Senator Darren Bailey, who became the Republican nominee for governor that year. McClure defeated Debolt by nearly 20 points. McClure was unopposed in the general election.

== Illinois Senate ==
=== 101st General Assembly ===
McClure was sworn into the Illinois Senate on January 9, 2019, to represent the 50th district. His first bill that became law was legislation that allowed for special license plates to raise awareness and funds for pediatric cancer research. The bill was filed in honor of Jonny Wade, a resident of Jerseyville, who died from cancer at the age of 8. In 2020, McClure and state Representative Avery Bourne passed legislation that made it illegal to post unauthorized private compromising images of another person online and created a court process to allow for a victim to have the images taken down with an emergency order and to recover damages.

Committee Assignments

Committee of the Whole; Agriculture; Criminal Law; Energy and Public Utilities; Higher Education (Minority Spokesperson); Local Government; Public Health; State Government; Supplier Diversity, Special Com. On; Pension Investments Special Com. On; Sub. on Utility Rate Regulations; Subcommittee on CLEAR Compliance; Subcommittee on Prisons; Public Safety Spec. Committee On.

=== 102nd General Assembly ===
In 2021, McClure became a member of Senate Republican leadership when he was appointed Assistant Republican Leader and Assistant Floor Leader for the Senate Republican Caucus. Later in 2021, McClure introduced and passed legislation to address the Illinois public school teacher shortage and COVID-19 student learning gap. He also passed legislation with state Representative C.D. Davidsmeyer to make it easier for veterans to get seasonal work at the Illinois Department of Transportation. In 2022, McClure and Davidsmeyer passed legislation to help schools hire bus drivers.

DCFS legislation

In January 2022, Illinois Department of Children and Family Services investigator Deidre Silas was stabbed to death while she was visiting a home in rural Sangamon County to check on the safety of children. At the time of her murder, DCFS investigators were not allowed to carry any defensive tools with them, including pepper spray. In 2017, DCFS investigator Pamela Knight was murdered by a man who pushed her to the ground and kicked her in the head while she was attempting to take a child into protective custody. In response to these murders, McClure filed legislation to allow DCFS frontline workers to carry pepper spray and establish a new self-defense training course that would include instruction on the proper use of pepper spray in emergency situations. The bill was signed into law by Governor J. B. Pritzker on May 27, 2022. Senator McClure took part in the course in the spring of 2023, which also included getting sprayed with pepper spray.

Prisoner Review Board

During Governor J. B. Pritzker's first years in office, the Illinois Prisoner Review Board, a 15-person body appointed by the Governor and confirmed by the State Senate, began voting to release very controversial inmates on parole. However, nine members of the Prisoner Review Board were never voted on or confirmed by the Senate. The Illinois Constitution required these nine appointments to be confirmed by the Senate after 60 session days. However, Governor Pritzker was allowing them to serve for up to 59 days, withdrawing their appointments, and then reappointing them days later, which reset the clock and circumvented the Senate. The Senate, made up of a super majority of members of Governor Pritzker's party, chose not to call any of the appointments to be confirmed.

Some of the controversial inmates that the Prisoner Review Board voted to release during this period include the Starved Rock Killer, child murderer and rapist Ray Larson (originally sentenced to 100–300 years in prison), double murderer and rapist Paul Bryant (originally sentenced to 500 to 1,500 years in prison), and Johnny Veal who murdered two police officers (originally sentenced to 100 to 199 years in prison).

After the Illinois Prisoner Review Board began making these controversial releases of prisoners, McClure, along with Senators Jason Plummer and Terri Bryant, led the efforts to have unconfirmed members of the board receive a vote in the State Senate. McClure, Plummer, and Bryant, who were the only Republicans on the Senate Executive Appointments Committee tasked with vetting all gubernatorial appointments, held a press conference in May 2021 to demand that Governor Pritzker's Prisoner Review Board appointments face a vote in that committee. One of Governor Pritzker's more recent appointments to the Board at the time of the press conference was Max Cerda, a community activist who was also a convicted double murderer.

Despite numerous attempts to force the Prisoner Review Board appointments to receive a vote in the Senate, the Democratic majority refused to call the appointments for a vote. The controversy came to a head when McClure had the chance to question the chair of the Prisoner Review Board in an unrelated appropriations committee hearing in March 2022. McClure asked several times if the convicted double murderer (Max Cerda) serving unconfirmed on the Prisoner Review Board had been voting to release people that he served time with in the Department of Corrections, among other questions. The day after McClure's questions in committee, Governor Pritzker removed Max Cerda from the Prisoner Review Board. In the two weeks that followed, other unconfirmed members of the Prisoner Review Board were finally called before the Senate.

After a contentious Senate Executive Appointments Committee hearing in which several Prisoner Review Board appointments faced scrutiny for the first time, one member of the Board resigned, two members were confirmed, and two others were rejected by the full Senate. When Prisoner Review Board member Eleanor Wilson, the final Prisoner Review Board member to be rejected by the Senate, was voted on, she only received 15 confirmation votes out of 59 senators. During McClure's floor speech advocating for Wilson to be rejected, he stated that, "We need to protect the public. And we need to stick up for victims and their families, no matter where they are in this state.” The Senate did confirm two new members of the Board in the final hours of session so that the Board would have a quorum.

Prisoner Review Board Controversy Aftermath
According to the Chicago Tribune, since the controversy, the board has "tightened up on approving parole." Upon analyzing the board's votes, the Tribune reported that for extremely serious crimes that involved lengthy prison sentences, the board went from granting release for more than 40% of the cases in 2021, to granting release for less than 15% of the cases. "People often ask what Republicans do in the Capitol when you don't have many numbers," McClure is quoted as saying in the Tribune story, "[but] this is probably our biggest accomplishment as Republicans was turning around the PRB."

Committee Assignments

Criminal Law (Minority Spokesperson); Agriculture; Energy and Public Utilities; Executive Appointments; Local Government; Transportation; App- Criminal Justice (Sub-Minority Spokesperson); App-Health; Redistricting; Redistricting- Chicago South; Redistricting- Southwestern IL; Redistricting- West Central IL (Sub-Minority Spokesperson); Criminal Law- Juvenile Court; Problem- Solving Courts.

=== 103rd General Assembly ===
McClure began representing the 54th district in the Illinois Senate in January 2023, and continued serving in leadership as Assistant Leader. Additionally, Senator McClure was appointed Floor Leader for the Senate Republican Caucus. In the spring 2023 session, McClure filed and passed Senate Bill 188 to restore parental rights for special needs parents so that they can access medical records for their children without having to go to court. The bill was sponsored by Rep. C.D. Davidsmeyer in the House and was signed into law in August 2023. Senator McClure also passed HB 2077 which requires dental offices to notify their patients in advance of a closure and ensures that if a dental facility closes, patients can still access their records. The bill passed both chambers unanimously and was signed into law in August 2023.

Committee Assignments

Approp- Health and Human; Behavioral and Mental Health; Environment and Conservation; Executive Appointments; Licensed Activities (Minority Spokesperson); S. C. on Crim Law & Public Safety; Sub Com. Special Issues.

== Electoral history ==
2018 Illinois State Senate District 50 General Election
Party	Candidate	Votes	%
Republican	Steve McClure	72,429	100.0
Total votes		72,429	100.0

2022 Illinois State Senate District 54 Republican Primary Election
Candidate	Votes	%
Steve McClure	18,041	59.9
Donald Debolt	12,095	40.1
Total votes	30,136	100.0

2022 Illinois State Senate District 54 General Election
Party	Candidate	Votes	%
Republican	Steve McClure	76,814	100.0
Total votes		76,814	100.0

== Awards and honors ==
Senator McClure and former state Representative Mike Murphy were honored with a road designation by Leland Grove, Illinois. "McClure-Murphy Parkway" stretches across Leland Grove's portion of Chatham Road.
