= Bruce DuMont =

American television broadcaster and syndicated radio political analyst (1944–2025)

- Born: June 18, 1944; New London, Connecticut, U.S.
- Died: September 10, 2025 (aged 81); Chicago, Illinois, U.S.
- Education: Columbia College Chicago (BA)
- Political party: Republican
- Spouses: Marcia DuMont; Kathy Osterman (m. 1992; died 1992) Kevin Fuller (m. 2023)
- Relatives: Allen B. DuMont (uncle)

Bruce DuMont (June 18, 1944 – September 10, 2025) was an American syndicated radio political analyst and television presenter based in Chicago, Illinois. He was the host of Beyond the Beltway, a syndicated talk radio show that was airing on 14 stations around the United States when it ended production on January 19, 2025. The program, which began in 1980 as Inside Politics, also aired a televised version on Chicago's secondary PBS station, WYCC, from 1996 to 2017, when WYCC went off the air.

DuMont got his start in broadcasting as a producer for WGN 720 AM in 1968. He interrupted his radio career to make an unsuccessful run for a seat in the Illinois Senate in 1970, then returned to WGN, this time as a producer for Howard Miller, a controversial radio personality. DuMont gained his first on-air radio experience at WLTD, now WCGO, in Evanston, Illinois, a 1,000-watt AM station at the time. It was at WLTD that he became nationally known for his investigative reporting on subjects such as Watergate and the CIA.

He then began to focus on producing news and documentaries for local television. A documentary about teenage suicides for WBBM-TV earned him an Iris Award from the National Association of Television Programming, while another documentary, this one about censorship in public libraries, earned him the Golden Gavel Award from the American Bar Association. He then worked as a producer for Chicago's primary PBS station, WTTW, heading up its broadcasts of the 1983 mayoral debates between Mayor Jane Byrne and her challengers, Richard M. Daley and Harold Washington. DuMont also produced WTTW's Chicago Tonight, and his on-camera work began in 1984 as the program's anchor for both the Republican National Convention and Democratic National Convention.

DuMont was the founder and former president of the Museum of Broadcast Communications, which began development in 1982. The MBC opened in June 1987 inside the River City condominium complex at 800 S. Wells St. in Chicago, then relocated to the Chicago Cultural Center five years later, where it remained until December 2003. After eight and a half years of delays related to construction and financing, the MBC reopened in its new location at 360 N. State St. on June 13, 2012. In August 2016 DuMont announced that he planned to retire as the museum's president; however, according to the website Chicagoland Radio and Media, "Officially, DuMont is voluntarily retiring from the MBC, claiming the decision is entirely his own, although in reality, there is far more behind it," including alleged financial mismanagement and controversy surrounding his personal life. He officially retired from the MBC on December 31, 2017.

From 1987 to 2006, he was the host of Illinois Lawmakers, a television show covering legislative news that originated from the State Capitol in Springfield during the months of the year when the Illinois General Assembly was in session.

DuMont was a member of the Peabody Awards' Board of Jurors from 1992 to 1998 and was the nephew of Allen B. DuMont, founder of the DuMont Television Network. He had one child, a daughter, from his first marriage, to Marcia DuMont; his second marriage was to Kathy Osterman from May 1, 1992, until her death from cancer on December 8, 1992. DuMont began dating Kevin Fuller in 1997; they were married from September 20, 2023, until DuMont's death. Fuller served a prison sentence from 2011 to 2016 for possession and online distribution of child pornography.

DuMont died of complications from cancer in Chicago, on September 10, 2025, at the age of 81.
