= Suzi Schmidt =

American politician

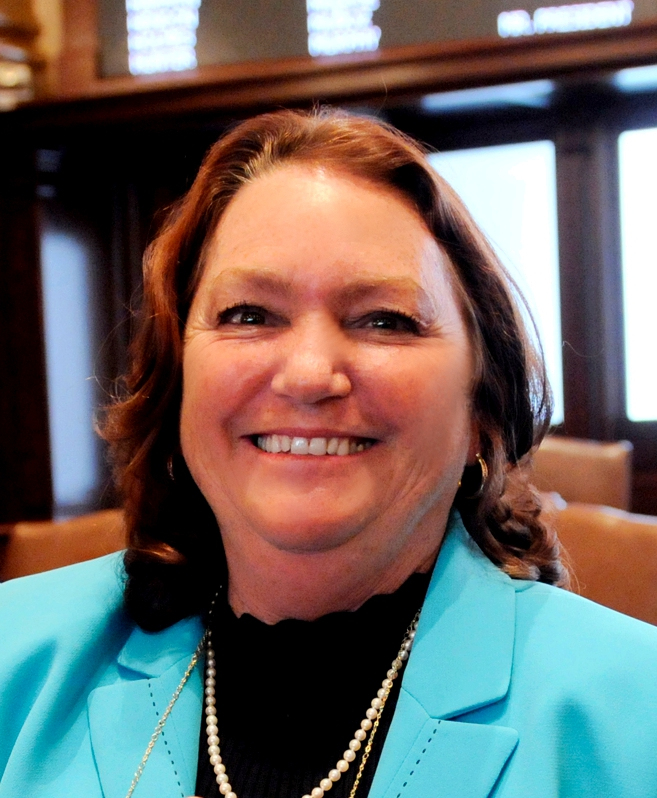

Member of the Illinois Senate from the 31st District
- In office January 12, 2011 – January 9, 2013
- Preceded by: Michael Bond
- Succeeded by: Melinda Bush

Chair of the Lake County Board
- In office December 6, 2000 – December 13, 2010
- Preceded by: Jim LaBelle
- Succeeded by: David Stolman

Personal details
- Party: Republican
- Spouse: Bob Schmidt (deceased)
- Education: Southern Illinois University

Suzi Schmidt is a former Republican Illinois State Senator, representing the 31st district from January 2011 to January 2013. She previously served as chairman of the Board of Lake County, Illinois from 2000 to 2010.

== Education and early life ==
Schmidt grew up in the Chicago area and attended Lyons Township High School and later earned a bachelor's degree from Southern Illinois University in 1974.

Schmidt worked as an art teacher in Fox Lake from 1974 to 1987 and served as the State Director for the Illinois Lakes Management Association from 1983 to 1985. She was elected to the Lake Villa Township Board in 1985.

== County board chairman ==
Schmidt was elected to the Lake County Board (Illinois) in 1988, representing the communities of Lake Villa and Lindenhurst. In 1988 she also became the commissioner of the Lake County Forest Preserve, a position she held from 1988 to 2010 where she became a staunch advocate for open lands, public space and the preservation of natural resources. She was elected as chairman of the Lake County Board in 2000, replacing incumbent Jim LaBelle. Schmidt was the first female chairman of Lake County, elected for an unprecedented 5 terms, and is noted for presiding over a decade during which the County Board consistently passed balanced budgets and maintained AAA bond rating.

In her tenure on the county board, Schmidt also served as chairman of the Lake County Liquor Commission and supported the extension of Route 53.

Schmidt as served as Metro County Board chairman from 2004 to 2010 and worked with the collar counties on issues facing county government, securing the Regional Transportation Authority (RTA) sales tax funding that was imperative to the sustainability of the RTA, Lake County, and the Metro County Region.

As chairman, she cracked down on violations of ordinances and worked to amend the adult use ordinance in 1998 to make it stricter.

Schmidt resigned from the County Board in January 2011 to assume her new position as an Illinois State Senator.

== Illinois Senate ==
=== Election ===
Schmidt was elected in 2010 after defeating Democratic incumbent Michael Bond with just over 53% of the popular vote.

=== Tenure ===
Shortly after taking office, Schmidt joined with other Senate Republicans in proposing a plan which would introduce more than $5 billion in reductions to government spending intended to "maintain core government services and also [prevent an] income tax increase".

Schmidt sponsored an amendment to the Deposit of State Moneys Act which places restrictions on the Illinois Treasurer's power to invest state funds. The bill passed both Houses of the Illinois General Assembly and was sent to the office of the governor. She also acted as the chief Senate sponsor of a bill which authorizes law enforcement agencies to collect pharmaceuticals for safe disposal.

Schmidt also supported the safe and scheduled removal of spent fuel rods housed at a de-commissioned nuclear plant in Zion, Illinois, and for the lands to be returned to the public, "I want to see this area go back to what it was --- open to the public for recreation. There is a beautiful shoreline here everyone should be able to enjoy."

Schmidt was a co-sponsor to legislation which would have allowed the practice of concealed carry in Illinois. She also co-sponsored a bipartisan resolution introduced by Democratic Senator Kwame Raoul which would amended the Illinois Constitution to consolidate the positions of state treasurer and state comptroller.

In 2011 Schmidt was appointed to the Commission on Government Forecasting and Accountability, which provides the legislature with research and information regarding state and national economies, revenue projections and operations of Illinois Government. She was also appointed to the Illinois Council on Aging during her first year in office.

In September 2011, the Illinois Environmental Council, a state environmental advocacy group, awarded Schmidt the Environmental Leadership Award for her work with the Lake County Forest Preserve.

=== Committee assignments ===
Schmidt was appointed minority spokesperson of the Local Government Committee during the 97th session of the Illinois General Assembly. She served on the following six committees:

- Appropriations II Committee
- Commerce Committee
- Education Committee
- Financial Institutions Committee
- Local Government Committee (Minority Spokesperson)
- Subcommittee on Annexation

== Personal life ==
Schmidt and her husband Bob were married in 1980 and currently reside in Lake Villa, Illinois.

On August 16, 2011, police were called to the Schmidt home by Bob Schmidt regarding a domestic dispute. Police did not release further details on the ongoing investigation of what they called a "verbal argument." As of August 19, 2011, no further details had been released regarding the verbal argument.

The police were again called to the Schmidt home twice in September 2011. The last 911 call made on September 26 was recorded, and has led to implications that Schmidt may have intended to use her political position to influence Lake County authorities against intervening in the matter. Schmidt later issued a press release to deny that this was her intent and apologize for the inappropriateness of the comments. Robert Schmidt consistently conveyed to the media that he considered the affair to be a private matter and did not wish to comment further.

Schmidt was arrested by Lake County Sheriff's deputies in the early evening of June 12, 2012 on a misdemeanor warrant alleging that she damaged her neighbor's property and trespassed, both stemming from a dispute with her neighbor. Schmidt was later acquitted of the charges and cleared of any wrongdoing.
