= Cynthia Soto =

American politician

Member of the Illinois House of Representatives from the 4th district
- In office 2001–2019
- Preceded by: Edgar Lopez
- Succeeded by: Delia Ramirez

Personal details
- Born: July 8, 1962 San Antonio, Texas
- Died: March 19, 2025 (aged 62)
- Party: Democratic
- Spouse: David Soto

Cynthia Soto was a Democratic former member of the Illinois House of Representatives, who represented the 4th District from 2001 to 2019.

== Early life ==
Soto attended James Otis Elementary School in West Town, St. Procopius High School and Harper College. She began her career working as a clerk in the Cook County State's Attorney's Office.

== State representative ==
Soto was the chief sponsor of the Living Wage Act, which proposes that employees working for companies that receive state contracts receive a fair wage of at least $8.20 per hour. Soto guided this bill through the House of Representatives, but the measure is stalled in the Illinois Senate.

Soto sponsored FamilyCare, which would provide health insurance to the working parents of children eligible for the KidCare program. The measure would benefit up to 200,000 working parents who cannot afford private insurance. Soto continued to work to expand health care by sponsoring a law that extends Medicaid coverage to low-income women for the treatment of breast or cervical cancer.

In an effort to alleviate teacher shortages, Soto sponsored a bill that would award 1,000 scholarships for students to become teachers. She believes these scholarships would provide students with educational opportunities and equip school with more qualified teachers.

In her district, Soto has worked with State Senator Miguel del Valle; they have sponsored citizenship and immigration workshops to offer bilingual educational, social and professional assistance to the community's new residents. They have hosted senior citizen health fairs and distributed valuable health and social service information and referrals. Soto and del Valle believe that there is a need for economic and business development in their district; the two hosted a Construction Opportunities Conference in which members of the community were invited to learn about job opportunities with the Soldier Field Renovation.

Soto also voted for the 7% "cap"; which raised property taxes for recently purchased homes and commercial properties.

== Petition challenge ==
In 2006, Soto challenged the nominating petitions of Green Party candidate Kathy Cummings. Volunteers for Cummings collected 3,494 signatures, exceeding the minimum of 1,531 that the Illinois Board of Elections required. The Illinois Democratic Party and the incumbent's objector challenged two thirds of Kathy's signatures. Kathy and her supporters were able to bring in enough additional proof to boost the number of accepted signatures to 1,518 before the Chicago Board of Elections stopped allowing any additional evidence. The objection was upheld and further appeals were unsuccessful, allowing Soto to remain unopposed in the election.

== Personal life ==
Soto and her husband David have three daughters. Their daughter Jessica Soto and Jessica's boyfriend Bradley Fichter were arrested and charged with aggravated battery for attacking her mother's opponent Robert Zwolinski on March 6, 2016.
