= Harry Osterman =

American politician

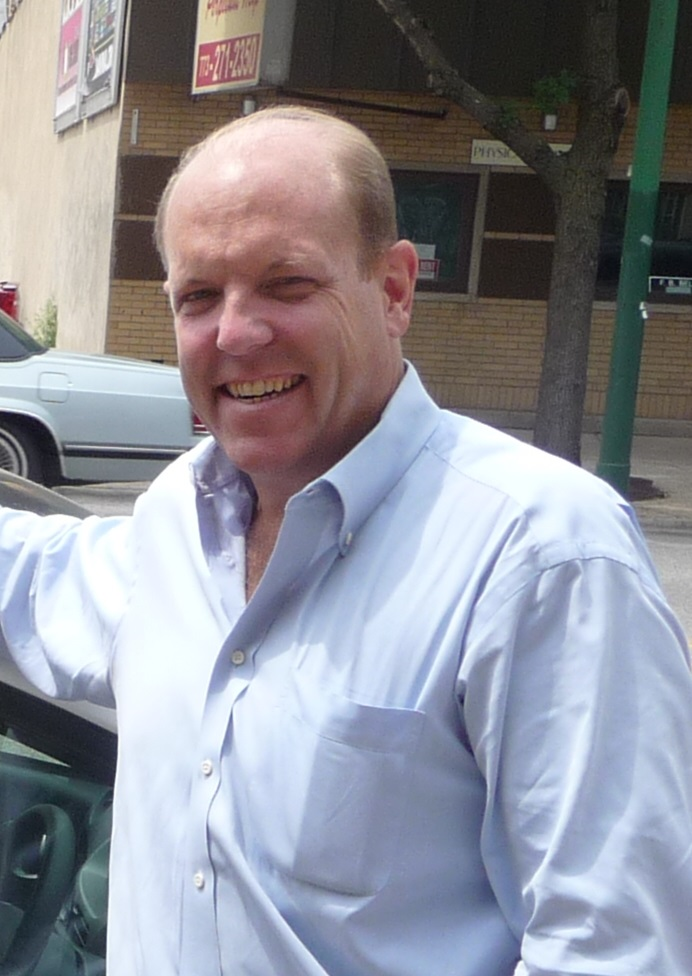
- Osterman in 2010

Member of the Chicago City Council from the 48th ward
- In office May 16, 2011 – May 15, 2023
- Preceded by: Mary Ann Smith
- Succeeded by: Leni Manaa-Hoppenworth

Member of the Illinois House of Representatives from the 14th district
- In office January 12, 2000 – May 16, 2011
- Preceded by: Carol Ronen
- Succeeded by: Kelly Cassidy

Personal details
- Born: April 14, 1967 (age 58) Chicago, Illinois, U.S.
- Party: Democratic
- Spouse: Peggy Osterman
- Children: 3
- Relatives: Kathy Osterman (mother)

Harry Osterman (born April 14, 1967) is an American politician who served as a member of the Chicago City Council from the 48th ward from 2011 to 2023. He previously served in the Illinois House of Representatives for the 14th District from 2000 to 2011.

== Early life and education ==
Born and raised in Chicago, Osterman graduated from Gordon Technical High School in 1985. He attended Illinois State University and Loyola University Chicago, but did not earn a degree.

== Career ==
Osterman began his career as an aide to 48th ward Alderman Mary Ann Smith, then he worked as a staff liaison to the Chicago Police Department and the Cook County State's Attorney’s Office.

=== Illinois House of Representatives ===
Osterman was originally appointed as to the state house to complete the term of Carol Ronen, who had been elected to the Illinois Senate.

Osterman represented the 14th district in the Illinois House of Representatives from 2000 until 2011, when he resigned to assume office as Chicago alderman.

=== Chicago City Council ===
Osterman was elected alderman for the 48th Ward in the 2011 Chicago aldermanic election to replace outgoing alderman Mary Ann Smith. He was reelected in 2015 and 2019. On July 15, 2022, Osterman announced he would not seek a 4th term as alderman.

During the mayoralty of Lori Lightfoot, Osterman has been considered an ally of Lightfoot on the City Council.

== Personal life ==
Harry Osterman's mother, Alderman Kathy Osterman represented the 48th Ward from 1987 to 1989.
