= Woody Bowman =

American politician and educator (1941–2015)

Henry Woods "Woody" Bowman (December 31, 1941 – July 10, 2015) was an American politician and educator.

Born in Ravenna, Ohio, Bowman received his bachelor's degree in economic and physics from Massachusetts Institute of Technology, his master's degree in public administration and his doctorate in economics from Syracuse University. Bowman moved to Chicago, Illinois and was an economist at the Federal Reserve Bank; he also taught economics at DePaul University and University of Chicago. Bowman served in the Illinois House of Representatives from 1977 to 1991 and was a Democrat. Bowman then became chief financial officer for Cook County, Illinois. Bowman was killed in an automobile accident on Interstate Highway 94 near Mattawan, Michigan.

In 1990, Bowman unsuccessfully sought the Democratic nomination for Illinois Comptroller.
