= Michael Bond (American politician) =

American politician

Member of the Illinois Senate from the 31st district
- In office 2007–2011
- Preceded by: Adeline Jay Geo-Karis
- Succeeded by: Suzi Schmidt

Personal details
- Party: Democratic
- Profession: Finance

Michael Bond is a former Democratic member of the Illinois Senate, representing the 31st District from 2007 to 2011.

He received his bachelor's degree in economics from Southern Illinois University in 1992, and his MBA in finance from Roosevelt University in 1997. Prior to being elected to the Senate, he held various finance and budgeting positions with Allstate Insurance Company, most recently director of corporate finance.

Bond was elected to fill the seat being vacated by longtime senator Adeline Jay Geo-Karis. Geo-Karis, who had served in the state Senate since 1979, was defeated in the Republican primary by Sue Simpson. Geo-Karis went on to endorse and actively campaign for Bond. Bond's election, in an historically Republican district, was one of the many Democratic victories in 2006 that gave the Democratic Party a super-majority in the state Senate.

Bond served as the vice-chairperson of the Transportation Committee, and serves on Appropriations II, Pensions and Investments, and State Government & Veterans Affairs Committees.

On November 2, 2010, Bond lost the general election to Lake County board chairman Suzi Schmidt. He got about 46.5% of the vote, versus just over 53% for Suzi Schmidt.
