= St. Gregory the Great High School =

Location
- 1677 West Bryn Mawr Avenue; Chicago, Illinois 60660; United States; 41°58′59″N 87°40′17″W

Information
- Type: private
- Motto: Christus (Christ)
- Denomination: Roman Catholic
- Established: 1937
- Closed: 2014
- Oversight: Archdiocese of Chicago
- President: Tony DeSapio
- Principal: Erika Mickelburgh
- Grades: 9–12
- Gender: coed
- Student to teacher ratio: 10:1
- Campus type: urban
- Colors: Red, White, Royal Blue and Gray
- Athletics conference: Metropolitan Prep
- Team name: Greyhounds
- Accreditation: North Central Association of Colleges and Schools
- Website: www.stgregory.org

St. Gregory the Great High School was a private, Roman Catholic high school in Chicago, Illinois, specifically in the area of West Edgewater. It was part of the Roman Catholic Archdiocese of Chicago.

== Background ==
St. Gregory the Great was established in 1937. It was the first coeducational Catholic school in the Chicago Diocese. In 2012, the Chicago Archdiocese and the school administration announced that, after 75 years, it would close. All remaining students were transferred to Holy Trinity High School at the end of the 2013-14 academic year.
