= Vince Demuzio =

American politician (1941–2004)

Member of the Illinois Senate from the 49th district
- In office January 1975 – April 2004
- Preceded by: A. C. Bartulis
- Succeeded by: Deanna Demuzio

Chairman of Democratic Party of Illinois
- In office 1986 – 1990
- Preceded by: Calvin Sutker
- Succeeded by: Gary LaPaille

Personal details
- Born: May 7, 1941 Gillespie, Illinois
- Died: April 27, 2004 (aged 62) Springfield, Illinois
- Party: Democratic
- Spouse: Deanna (née Clemonds)
- Children: Two children
- Education: Sangamon State University
- Profession: Politician

Vince Demuzio (May 7, 1941 – April 27, 2004) was a Democratic member of the Illinois Senate from January 1975 until his death in April 2004. During his time in the Senate, he represented various portions of southwestern Illinois. At the time of his death, he was the most senior member of the Illinois Senate.

In addition to his service in the Illinois Senate, he served as the Chairman of the Illinois Democratic Party from 1986 to 1990.

== Early life ==
Demuzio was born May 7, 1941, in Gillespie, Illinois. He attended SS. Simon and Jude Catholic School and Gillespie High School. He went on to become Executive Director of the Illinois Valley Economic Development Corporation.

== Illinois Senate ==
He was first elected in 1974 in an upset against Senator A.C. "Junie" Bartulis. After that election, he handily beat most of his opponents and during the later half of his career ran unopposed. At the beginning of his Senate tenure, Demuzio became part of a group of legislators called the "Crazy 8" which included, among others, Terry L. Bruce and Dawn Clark Netsch. Two years later, the group teamed up with Harold Washington and other members of the Illinois Legislative Black Caucus to win legislative reforms from Thomas Hynes by withholding support for his election as Senate President. Keeping with his maverick ways, he ran for Secretary of State on a slate with independent Democratic Governor Dan Walker. He lost the Democratic primary to Alan J. Dixon who would serve as Secretary of State until his election to the United States Senate.

In 1983, he was appointed as an Assistant Majority Leader and reappointed each session until the Democrats lost their majority during the 1992 election. After that he remained in Democratic leadership as an Assistant Minority Leader. When the Democrats retook the Senate in 2002, he was subsequently appointed the Senate Majority Leader.

During his time in the Senate, he commuted to his home in Carlinville rather than stay in Springfield.

=== Education ===
One of Demuzio's focuses in the Senate was education. In 1981, he received his B.A. in education and human services and his M.A. in education and public policy in 1996, both from Sangamon State University (now University of Illinois at Springfield). In 1977, he secured state matching funds to create the Orr Research Center, a University of Illinois facility in Pike County. He was the Chief Sponsor of SB 0566 which mandated that if a child is deaf, hard of hearing, blind, or visually impaired and he or she might be eligible to receive services from the Illinois School for the Deaf or the Illinois School for the Visually Impaired, the school district shall notify the parents or guardian. The bill was signed into law July 22, 2003.

Outside of the Senate, he was a member of the Board of Trustees for Blackburn College in Carlinville, where the Demuzio Student Center is named in his honor.

=== Other legislative initiatives ===
In 1999, he helped to create the Penny Severns Breast and Cervical Cancer Research Fund, named after the late Penny Severns who died of breast cancer in 1998. He also advocated for legislation to increase the Rural Bond Bank's bond authorization and the maximum amount used to purchase securities issued by certain units of local government, ushered the creation of the Downstate Illinois Sports Facilities Authority through the Senate and wrote the Electronic Transfer Act.

=== 49th district ===
During his time in the Illinois Senate, Demuzio represented the 49th district, located in southwestern Illinois. From 1991 until 2001, the district stretched from Christian County in the east to Calhoun County in the west and included Montgomery, Bond, Macoupin, Greene, Jersey, Morgan counties and a small portion of Madison County. During the 2001 redistricting process, his district remained largely the same, though it added a small portion of Fayette County.

=== Committee assignments ===
Demuzio spent the bulk of his career as a member of the Education committee. He also served on the Legislative Audit Commission and served on the Steering Committee to re-examine the Illinois Constitution. He was also involved in the redistricting process in both 1991 and 2001 as a member of the Legislative Redistricting Commissions.

== Democratic Party Chairman ==
Demuzio served as the Democratic Central Committeeman for Illinois's 20th congressional district along with Central Committeewoman Penny Severns. In 1986, he became the chair of the Illinois Democratic Party after Calvin Sutker lost his race for Central Committeeman in Illinois's 9th congressional district, making Sutker ineligible to be chair of the party. Due to disunity amongst the central committee members from Chicago, he was able to be elected with support from downstate members.

Prior to being elected chair, two followers of Lyndon LaRouche won primaries for Lieutenant Governor and Secretary of State respectively. Adlai Stevenson III, the Democratic gubernatorial nominee, formed the Solidarity Party as he did not want to run alongside anybody associated with LaRouche's organization. Subsequently, Demuzio and the party had to create a campaign to get Democratic voters to split their tickets. Though Stevenson lost to James R. Thompson, the Democrats kept majorities in the Illinois General Assembly and gained two seats on the then-elected University of Illinois Board of Trustees. In 1990, Demuzio was ousted as Chair by Gary LaPaille. After his tenure, he was largely credited with rebuilding the infrastructure of the Illinois Democratic Party.

== Death and legacy ==
In August 2003, Demuzio was diagnosed with terminal colon cancer which he died of on April 27, 2004. After his death, his seat was filled by wife Deanna Demuzio who served until 2011. The portion of Interstate 55 in Illinois that goes from the final exit in Springfield to Illinois Route 138 in Macoupin County was renamed in his honor. In 2005, the State of Illinois created the Vince Demuzio Memorial Colon Cancer Fund. It is funded by a check off on individual income tax forms and the money is then distributed to public or private entities in Illinois for the purpose of funding research applicable to colon cancer patients by the Department of Public Health. Southern Illinois University at Edwardsville currently runs the Vince Demuzio Governmental Internship Program, which allows students paid internships with various state legislators and state agencies. One of his former interns, Andy Manar, was elected to the Illinois Senate in 2012 in a newly created district including much of Demuzio's old district.
