= Sam McCann =

American politician

Member of the Illinois Senate
- In office January 11, 2011 – January 9, 2019
- Preceded by: Deanna Demuzio
- Succeeded by: Steve McClure
- Constituency: 50th district (2013-2019); 49th district (2011–2013)

Personal details
- Born: November 4, 1969 (age 56) West Hamlin, West Virginia, U.S.
- Party: Republican; Conservative (2018)
- Spouse: Vicki
- Education: Blackburn College
- Occupation: Business Owner
- Criminal information
- Convictions: Fraudulent use of campaign funds; Money laundering; Tax evasion
- Penalty: 3½ years in prison; $683,816 fine

Details
- Date apprehended: February 2021

William "Sam" McCann Jr. (born November 4, 1969) is an American politician who was a member of the Illinois Senate from 2011 to 2019. He was first elected in 2010 as a Republican in the 49th district, defeating incumbent Democrat Deanna Demuzio, and was later elected to the redrawn 50th district in central Illinois.

In 2018, McCann left the Republican Party and ran for Governor of Illinois as the nominee of the newly founded Conservative Party. He ran as a more socially conservative alternative to incumbent Republican governor Bruce Rauner. On July 10, 2024, he was sentenced in federal court to 3 1/2 years in prison after pleading guilty to fraudulent use of campaign funds, money laundering and tax evasion.

== Early life and education ==
Sam McCann attended Lewis & Clark Community College and Blackburn College, although he never earned a bachelor's degree.

== Work ==
Starting in 1993, McCann was the president of his own construction company. Records from the Illinois Secretary of State's Office show that "the agency dissolved the corporate status of McCann Construction Services Inc. as of December 2013 for failure to file an annual report and pay an annual franchise tax. McCann Construction Co. was also dissolved as a corporation by the secretary of state on Nov. 14 for the same reasons." As of May 20, 2015, McCann's two companies: McCann Construction and McCann Construction Services faced tax liens from the Internal Revenue Services totaling $185,000.

== Elections ==
=== State senate ===
McCann was first elected in 2010, narrowly defeating incumbent Democrat Deanna Demuzio. It was one of the most expensive and competitive legislative races in Illinois that year. In 2012, he was re-elected after a primary race against Gray Noll, and without Democratic opposition in the redrawn 50th district.

During McCann's 2016 run for re-election, he faced a primary challenger, Bryce Benton, a state trooper who was backed by Illinois governor Bruce Rauner; Rauner reportedly spent more than $3 million on Benton's behalf, after McCann voted with Democrats in the legislature to override Rauner's veto of a union arbitration bill. McCann ultimately won re-nomination with 52.67 percent of the vote to Benton's 47.33 percent. McCann then ran unopposed in the general election.

=== 2018 gubernatorial election ===
McCann did not run for re-election in 2018, instead forming the Conservative Party of Illinois in order to run in the 2018 Illinois gubernatorial election as a third-party candidate nominee. In an interview with Politico, McCann described himself as an "independent conservative" and stated that he was motivated to run to prevent "two billionaires from Chicago" from being the only general-election candidates. McCann's campaign platform was perceived as being rooted in social issues such as abortion; McCann argued that economic issues, such as the state's levels of debt, were equally important to his campaign. McCann also argued that he was more closely aligned with then-President Donald Trump than was Rauner.

In order to qualify to appear on the ballot, McCann needed to collect at least 25,000 signatures; he ultimately received more than 65,000. McCann ultimately placed third in the election, with four percent of the vote, behind J.B. Pritzker and Bruce Rauner.

== Indictment on federal charges ==
In early 2016, a complaint was filed with the Illinois State Board of Elections alleging that McCann had given himself too much money from his campaign fund for mileage reimbursements that were in excess of the amount that McCann actually traveled, and that McCann had also given himself money from the same fund for "grouped expenditures" which were not properly documented. The "grouped expenditures" totaled $46,719. The total amount for the challenged mileage reimbursements and "grouped expenditures" that McCann personally received from his campaign fund was $85,019.65. After hearing from the complainant and McCann, the board voted unanimously to hold a public hearing. A day before the public hearing was to take place in September 2016, the complaint was dropped, but the complainant, through his attorney, pledged to refile it and include more allegations. In September 2017, McCann came under fire again when he used campaign funds to purchase an SUV for over $60,000 and a new engine on a personally owned vehicle.

In February 2021, McCann was indicted by the U.S. Attorney's Office on charges of fraud, money laundering, and tax evasion related to his alleged misuse of campaign money for personal expenses. The indictment alleges that from May 2015 to June 2020, McCann engaged in a scheme to convert more than $200,000 in contributions and donations made to his campaign committees to pay himself and make personal purchases, and that he concealed his fraud from donors, the public, the Illinois State Board of Elections and law enforcement authorities.

On February 15, 2024, near the end of his trial, McCann changed his plea to guilty on all the counts of corruption against him. On July 10, 2024, he was sentenced to 42 months in prison followed by 2 years of supervised parole and was ordered to pay $683,816.61 in restitution.

== Family ==
McCann's wife is named Vicki. They have a son, Trayton, and a daughter, Katherine. He is the son of the late William S. McCann of Zephyrhills, FL who died in a house fire in January,1977. His mother, Nellie Tipton, resides in Logan County, WV. He has three half sisters and two half brothers. He is the nephew of former Lincoln County, WV, County Commissioner, Charles McCann, and Ronald Z. McCann, West Virginia Public Service Commissioner.
