= Vera Paktor =

American maritime administrator (1949-1995)

Vera Paktor (1949–1995) was a Hungarian-American journalist and maritime administrator.

== Biography ==
Paktor was born on June 14, 1949 in Budapest, Hungary. In 1956, her family emigrated from Hungary, settling in Chicago. Paktor became a naturalized U.S. citizen in 1966. She graduated from Southern Illinois University at Carbondale in 1972 with a degree in journalism and was certified to practice maritime law in Washington, D.C., in 1981.

In 1977, Paktor became a vice president of Great Lakes and European Lines. From 1978 to 1981, she served as the district director of the Federal Maritime Commission, the first woman appointed to that role, and received a meritorious service award. In 1994, she was a candidate for the presidential appointment of administrator for the commission. Paktor was also the executive vice president of the United States Great Lakes Shipping Association and was involved in the development of the 1985 Maritime Act. In 1982, she was elected the first female president of the Propeller Club of the United States, a trade organization for maritime industry executives.

Paktor founded Communicore Inc., a firm in Evanston, Illinois, that focused on maritime issues. As a writer for Seaway Review, she authored more than 100 articles on maritime subjects. Her 1992 book, Federal Regulations and the Freight Forwarders, was a manual for the shipping industry concerning freight forwarding and was translated into Spanish in 1995. In the early 1980s, she was a crew member on a vintage tugboat that was brought to Chicago via the St. Lawrence Seaway for the Chicago Yacht Club.

In politics, Paktor managed campaigns for local and state politicians and was a candidate for Cook County commissioner in 1994. She was appointed to Mayor Richard M. Daley’s Council on Manpower and Economic Advisory Board as its youngest member. She also served on the boards of several Jewish community centers and congregations in the Chicago area, including the Bernard Horwich Jewish Community Center, Beth Hillel Congregation, Temple Beth El, and the Mayer Kaplan Jewish Community Center.

Paktor was married to Allen Gross. She died on November 15, 1995, in Skokie, Illinois.
