= Deanna Demuzio =

American politician (1943–2020)

Mayor of Carlinville
- In office May 2013 – October 20, 2020
- Preceded by: Robert Schwab
- Succeeded by: Sara Oswald

Member of the Illinois Senate from the 49th district
- In office May 11, 2004 – January 11, 2011
- Preceded by: Vince Demuzio
- Succeeded by: Sam McCann

Personal details
- Born: February 23, 1943 St. Louis, Missouri, U.S.
- Died: October 20, 2020 (aged 77) St. Louis, Missouri, U.S.
- Party: Democratic
- Spouse: Vince Demuzio

Deanna Demuzio (February 23, 1943 – October 20, 2020) was an American politician who served as a Democratic member of the Illinois Senate. She represented the 49th District from 2004 through 2010.

== Illinois Senate ==
In May 2004, she was appointed to the Illinois State Senate from the 49th district following the death of her husband, former Senate Majority Leader Vince Demuzio. The 49th district, located in central and southwest Illinois, included all of Calhoun, Montgomery, Macoupin, Greene, Jersey, and Morgan counties and portions of Christian, Fayette, Madison, Pike, and Shelby counties. Deanna Demuzio ran unopposed in November 2004 to keep the seat vacated by her husband for the rest of his term. In 2006 she was challenged by Republican candidate and Taylorville alderman Jeff Richey in the general election. On the Taylorville City Council, Richey was chairman of the Ordinance Committee, and served on the Finance, Street, Sewer, and Emergency Services committees. Demuzio defeated Richey in the 2006 general election, taking 59.75% of the vote to Richey's 40.28%. In the 2010 election, Demuzio was defeated by Sam McCann.

== Post-legislative career ==
Demuzio served as a delegate to the 2012 Democratic National Convention. In 2012, Governor Pat Quinn, appointed Demuzio to a position on the Illinois Health Facilities Services and Review Board. Demuzio served on the board until her death.

== Death ==
She died on October 20, 2020, in St. Louis, Missouri at the age of 77. The Carlinville City Council chose Sarah Oswald to serve the remainder of Demuzio's term.
