= Aaron Jaffe =

American attorney and politician (1930–2025)

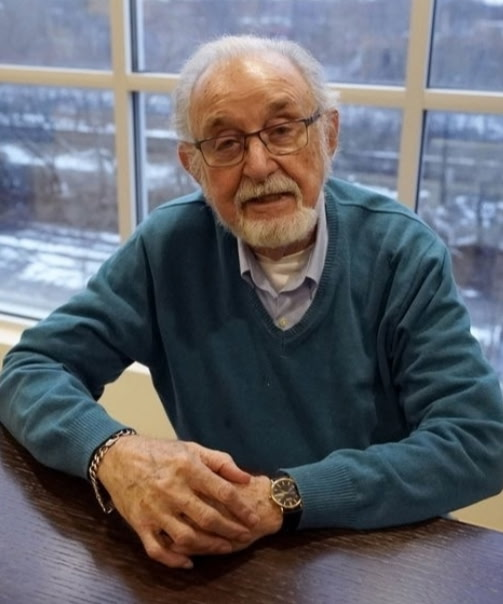

Chairman of the Illinois Gaming Board
- In office 2005–2015
- Appointed by: Rod Blagojevich

Judge of the Circuit Court of Cook County
- In office 1985–2004

Member of the Illinois House of Representatives
- In office 1971–1985
- Constituency: 4th district (1971–1983); 56th district (1983–1985)

Personal details
- Born: May 16, 1930 Chicago, Illinois, U.S.
- Died: September 10, 2025 (aged 95)
- Party: Democratic
- Education: UCLA; University of Illinois Chicago; DePaul University
- Profession: Attorney; judge; public official

Aaron Jaffe (May 16, 1930 – September 10, 2025) was an American attorney, judge and Democratic politician from Illinois. He served in the Illinois House of Representatives from 1971 to 1985 and on the Circuit Court of Cook County from 1985 to 2004. Jaffe later chaired the Illinois Gaming Board from 2005 to 2015.

== Early life and education ==
Jaffe was born in Chicago and attended Chicago public schools. He studied at the University of California, Los Angeles, and the University of Illinois Chicago before earning a J.D. from DePaul University College of Law in 1953, the same year he was admitted to the Illinois bar. He moved to Skokie, Illinois, in 1959.

== Political career ==
Active in Democratic politics in Niles Township, Jaffe served as a local Democratic committeeman in the late 1960s and early 1970s. He won election to the Illinois House of Representatives in 1970 and served through 1985. He represented the 4th district through the 82nd General Assembly and, after redistricting, the 56th district in the 83rd and 84th General Assemblies. Contemporary coverage described him as a lawyer and college instructor and noted his roles as a Democratic National Convention delegate in 1972 and 1976. Jaffe entered the House in the same 1971 freshman class as Michael Madigan and departed in 1985 to become a judge.

== Judicial career ==
Jaffe was appointed to the Circuit Court of Cook County in 1985, elected in 1986, and retained in 1992 and 1998. He served in multiple divisions: Domestic Relations (1985–1991), Law Division – Jury Section (1991–1993), and Chancery (1993–2004). He retired from the bench in 2004.

== Illinois Gaming Board ==
In 2005, Governor Rod Blagojevich appointed Jaffe as chairman of the Illinois Gaming Board; he was subsequently reappointed by Governor Pat Quinn. During his tenure, Illinois implemented video gambling statewide following legislative authorization, and Jaffe frequently emphasized vetting and enforcement to keep criminal elements out of the industry. In 2013 he publicly opposed elements of a proposed gambling expansion bill, citing oversight concerns. Jaffe served as chairman until 2015.

== Death ==
Jaffe died on September 10, 2025, at the age of 95. He was Jewish.

== Publications ==
A 700-page oral history and profile of Jaffe's legislative, judicial, and regulatory work was published in 2016: Judge Aaron Jaffe: Reforming Illinois: A Progressive Tackles State Government, 1970–2015 by Charles M. Barber (AuthorHouse).
