= Heather Steans =

American politician (born 1963)

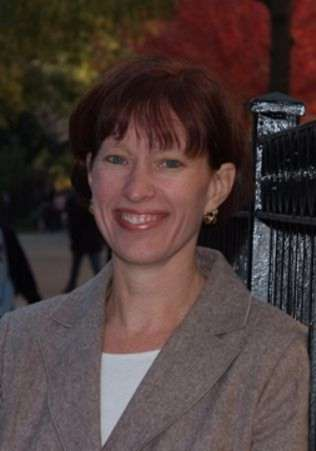

Member of the Illinois Senate from the 7th district
- In office February 10, 2008 – January 31, 2021
- Preceded by: Carol Ronen
- Succeeded by: Mike Simmons

Personal details
- Born: May 8, 1963 (age 63) Lake Forest, Illinois, U.S.
- Party: Democratic
- Spouse: Leo Smith
- Education: Princeton University (BA); Harvard University (MPP)

Heather Adeline Steans (born May 8, 1963) is a former Democratic member of the Illinois Senate, representing the 7th district. She was appointed after winning a special primary election that followed the mid-term resignation of her predecessor, Senator Carol Ronen. She resigned from office on January 19, 2021 after 12 years in office.

== Early life ==
Steans was born on May 8, 1963, in Lake Forest, Illinois. Her father, Harrison I. Steans, was a wealthy banker who founded a bank holding company he later sold to JPMorgan Chase. Eventually becoming a billionaire, in 1994 he founded Financial Investments Corporation, which invests the Steans family wealth.

Financial Investments Corporation is now run by Steans's sister Jennifer, and has recently invested in Asia-focused private equity firms. Financial Investments Corporation also is actively invested in the banking and energy (oil and gas) industries, and had an investment in hydraulic fracturing (fracking) services company Liberty Oilfield Services prior to its initial public offering in 2018, though Steans is not invested herself.

== Education ==
Steans graduated with an A.B. in sociology from Princeton University in 1985 after completing a senior thesis titled "Public vs. Private: Low and Moderate Income Housing in Trenton, New Jersey." She earned an M.P.P. from Harvard University's John F. Kennedy School of Government.

== Professional career ==
Steans is the former budget director of the Wisconsin Department of Industry, Labor, and Human Relations. She also worked as a strategic planner for the Chicago Public Schools and as a consultant at Ernst & Young.

== Political positions ==
=== LGBT rights ===
In 2009, Steans introduced a gay marriage bill (SB 2468) which introduces civil marriages in Illinois and allows religious institutions the right to decline marrying same sex couples. SB 2468 states, "nothing in the Act should be construed to interfere or regulate any religious practice concerning marriage and no religion is required to solemnize a marriage to which it objects". In 2013, Steans sponsored the gay marriage bill that was signed into law. Equality Illinois CEO Bernard Cherkasov called Steans "one of the General Assembly's most vocal and passionate supporters of full equality for LGBT people, including being the chief Senate sponsor of the marriage bill."

=== Healthcare reform ===
Steans was the Chief Sponsor of IL Senate Bill 655 (SB685), which created new rules designed to improve care at nursing homes and prevent patient neglect and abuse. According to a press release by the Office of Governor Pat Quinn, "The new law remakes the system of admission to nursing homes, ensuring that only those in need of 24-hour skilled care are admitted. .. The law sets higher nursing home quality and staffing requirements, raises penalties for violations, and increases inspections and monitoring."

Steans also partnered with a formal political rival, Suzanne Elder, to pass anti-discrimination legislation. Working together, she and Elder faced formidable opposition from the state's teachers' unions and overrode an amendatory veto from Governor Quinn to enact legislation that protects the health and civil rights of students with diabetes and other disabilities (The Care of Students with Diabetes Act, P.A. 96–1485).

In 2012, Heather Steans sponsored the "Save Medicaid Access and Resources Together Act" (SMART Act), which saved Illinois $1.6 billion in Medicaid costs by increasing the efficiency of the program. Steans also passed a law that allowed Illinois to enact Medicaid expansion under the Patient Protection and Affordable Care Act.

In 2018 Heather Seans was the lead sponsor in the Senate to restrict Illinoisans' access to non-Obamacare compliant healthcare plans in an attempt to force them into much more expensive Obamacare compliant health insurance plans.

=== Discrimination ===
Steans sponsored Illinois' Equal Pay Act of 2012, which holds individuals liable for wage discrimination on the basis of gender. Steans has led the fight to have Illinois ratify the Equal Rights Amendment, which passed the Illinois State Senate. On the subject, Steans said, "From equal pay to equal health care access to fair treatment on college campuses, women's rights are at risk as long as they are not protected in the Constitution."

=== Environment ===
Steans authored the Lead Sinker Act, SB 1269, an education program that promotes the use of fishing products that are not detrimental to humans and wildlife.

Co-sponsoring SB 3346 with State Representative Karen May, Steans passed a bill reducing mercury in the ambient environment by improving the material's collection and recycling from thermostat units. According to the Environmental Law and Policy Center, an organization that helped to draft the bill, "It's a bill that environmentalists, manufacturers and the entire General Assembly could agree on."

Steans and her colleagues passed legislation that made Illinois the first state in the nation to ban the sale and manufacture of microbeads in cosmetics and soaps, which are major source of plastic pollution.

=== Education ===
Senator Steans helped lead in the passage of a law that strengthened Illinois' anti-bullying laws by through anonymous reporting, protecting student privacy, prohibiting retaliation and other measures. Steans further spearheaded efforts to create an independent state body with the power to require local taxing bodies to support private charter schools, even where the relevant school board would not do so voluntarily. This move in support of the charter school movement followed her efforts to pass SB7, which streamlined the process for firing public school teachers and made it more difficult for teachers to engage in the protected union activity of striking for better working conditions. The latter bill was part of the political run-up to then-Mayor Rahm Emanuel's overseeing the closing of roughly fifty elementary schools in Chicago with primarily African American student bodies.

=== Redistricting ===
Steans is a supporter of a group called "Yes for Independent Maps" redistricting reform proposals. Steans believes that independent maps would help "restore faith in our political system," in Illinois.

=== Fiscal issues ===
As Chair of the Senate Appropriations I committee, Steans has worked to resolve Illinois budget impasse with Governor Bruce Rauner and the General Assembly. Steans opposed what she called Rauner's "draconian cuts" to programs for Illinois' "most vulnerable" and she supported a budget solution with what she termed "moderate cuts in spending and a moderate increase in revenues" in a budget.

== State Senate ==
Steans has served in the Illinois Senate for the 7th district since 2008. In 2018, Democrat J. B. Pritzker appointed Steans the Co-chair of the gubernatorial transition's Healthy Children and Families Committee.

On January 19, 2021, Steans announced she would be resigning from the Illinois State Senate effective January 31, 2021. Local Democratic leaders appointed Mike Simmons as her replacement.

=== Committees ===
- Appropriations I (Chairperson)
- Environment and Conservation (Vice-Chairperson)
- Appropriations II (Vice-Chairperson)
- Human Services

== Elections ==
Steans' predecessor, Carol Ronen, announced her resignation on October 22, 2007. Ronen said the timing of her announcement was chosen "so that anyone who wishes to run for the office will be able to file petitions for the February 5th, 2008, primary election by the November 5th deadline." Only two individuals, Heather Steans and Suzanne Elder, were able to collect enough signatures to run in the special primary. Steans won the election with 63.26% of the vote.

In 2008, Steans won re-election when she received 55,457 votes, ahead of her opponent's 13,190 votes. In 2010, Steans received 83.69% of the voter in her re-election. Steans was unopposed in her 2012 and 2016 reelection campaigns.

== Personal life ==
Steans and her husband, Leo, live in Chicago's Edgewater neighborhood and have three children.
