= Carol Ronen =

American politician (born 1945)

Member of the Illinois Senate
- In office January 2000 – February 2008
- Preceded by: Arthur Berman
- Succeeded by: Heather Steans
- Constituency: 9th district (2000–2003); 7th district (2003–2008)

Member of the Illinois House of Representatives from the 17th district
- In office January 1993 – January 2000
- Preceded by: Lee Preston
- Succeeded by: Harry Osterman

Personal details
- Born: March 28, 1945 (age 81) Chicago, Illinois, U.S.
- Party: Democratic
- Education: Bradley University (BA); Roosevelt University (MPA)

Carol Ronen (born March 28, 1945) is an American politician who served as a Democratic member of both houses of the Illinois General Assembly.

== Early life ==
Ronen was born March 28, 1945. She earned a bachelor's in political science at Bradley University and a master of public administration from Roosevelt University. Ronen served as the legislative and community affairs director of the Chicago Department of Human Services, as an assistant commissioner of the Chicago Department of Planning and Development, and an assistant commissioner of the Chicago Department of Planning. She also served as the executive director of the Chicago Commission on Women from 1989 to 1990. For a period, she served as the President of the Illinois Task Force on Child Support.

== Illinois General Assembly ==
In the 1992 Democratic primary, Ronen ousted seven-term incumbent Lee Preston in the 17th district.

Incumbent Senator Arthur Berman announced he would not run for reelection in the 2000 general election. Ronen was the only candidate to file to run in the Democratic primary for the seat. Berman resigned from the Illinois Senate on January 2, 2000 in order to take a position directing mediation services for the Chicago Board of Education. The Democratic Legislative Committee of the 9th Legislative District appointed Ronen to the vacancy. In that year's general election, Ronen was elected to the Illinois Senate from the 9th district. Harry Osterman was appointed to succeed Ronen in the Illinois House.

In 2005 she was inducted into the Chicago Gay and Lesbian Hall of Fame as a Friend of the Community.

Ronen announced her retirement in October 2007. After Ronen's retirement, Heather Steans won the special election to succeed here.

== Democratic Party positions ==
Carol is an active player in Democratic politics at the local, state and federal level. In her role as 9th C.D. Committeewoman, in 2008, she organized volunteers to travel to Iowa in support of her former state senate colleague Barack Obama. On November 4, 2008, she coordinated an election day phone back to Indiana voters.

Unopposed in each race, she was elected to a four-year term as the 48th Ward Democratic Committeeman in February 2008 and to a four-year term (her fourth) in February 2010 as Democratic State Central Committeewoman for the 9th congressional District where she works closely with longtime friend and ally Congresswoman Jan Schakowsky.

At the national level Carol was elected as a delegate to the 1996, 2000 and 2004 Democratic Conventions. In 2004 she was appointed to represent Illinois on the Democratic National Committee. In 2008 Carol was a super delegate at the Democratic convention that nominated her friend and former Senate colleague Barack Obama.

Helping women get elected to office is a driving interest. To further this goal Carol helped found Women's Voices, Women's Votes, an Illinois state political action committee that supports the election of progressive Democratic women in the Illinois General Assembly and she is on the Advisory Board of Illinois Women in Leadership, a group which mentors young women who seek to run for office.

== Other ==
In 2005 she was inducted into the Chicago Gay and Lesbian Hall of Fame as a Friend of the Community.
