= Illinois's 26th Senate district =

Electoral district of Illinois

Illinois's 26th State Senate district
Senator
Darby Hills; R–Barrington Hills

Illinois's 26th Senate District is a legislative district in the northwest suburbs of Chicago, encompassing parts of Lake, McHenry, Cook, and Kane counties. The district includes communities such as Algonquin, Barrington, Lake in the Hills, Lake Zurich, Libertyville, Long Grove, Mundelein, North Barrington, Palatine, Port Barrington, Rolling Meadows, Schaumburg, South Barrington, Tower Lakes, Vernon Hills, Volo, and Wauconda.

== Current representation ==
Since February 2025, the district has been represented by Darby Hills, a member of the Republican Party. Hills was sworn in on February 28, 2025, after Republican leaders selected her to succeed Dan McConchie, who had resigned effective February 2, 2025, to lead a nonprofit focused on disability accessibility. Before joining the Senate, Hills served as a trustee on the Barrington Hills Village Board and founded Barrington Children's Charities.

== List of members representing the district ==
Representative	Party	Years in Office
William E. Peterson	Republican	1993–2009
Dan Duffy	Republican	2009–2016
Dan McConchie	Republican	2016–2025
Darby Hills	Republican	2025–present

== House districts ==
The 26th Senate District is divided into two Illinois House of Representatives districts:

- The 51st House District, represented by Nabeela Syed (D)
- The 52nd House District, represented by Martin McLaughlin (R)
