= Illinois's 51st House of Representatives district =

American legislative district

Illinois's 51st State House of Representatives district
Representative
| Nabeela Syed; D–Palatine |

Illinois's 51st House District is one of the 118 legislative districts in the Illinois House of Representatives. The district is located in the northeastern part of the state, primarily covering portions of Lake County.

== Geography ==
The 51st House District located in Chicago's north suburbs, includes all or parts of Hawthorn Woods, Long Grove, Lake Zurich, Deer Park, Kildeer, Palatine, Rolling Meadows, Hoffman Estates, and Schaumburg. The district is largely suburban and is known for its residential neighborhoods and business districts.

== History ==
The boundaries of the 51st House District have shifted over time due to redistricting following the decennial United States Census. Historically, the district has been considered politically competitive, with representation from both major parties.

== Representatives ==
The following individuals have served as the elected representatives for Illinois's 51st House District:

| Name | Party | Term |
|---|---|---|
| Robert W. Churchill | Republican | 1993–2003 |
| Ed Sullivan Jr. | Republican | 2003–2017 |
| Nick Sauer | Republican | 2017–2018 |
| Helene Miller Walsh | Republican | 2018–2019 |
| Mary Edly-Allen | Democratic | 2019–2021 |
| Chris Bos | Republican | 2021–2023 |
| Nabeela Syed | Democratic | 2023–present |

== Elections ==
Elections for the Illinois House of Representatives are held every two years. The district has seen competitive races, with shifts in political control reflecting broader state and national trends.

== See also ==
- Illinois General Assembly
- Illinois House of Representatives
