= Andrew J. McKenna =

American businessman (1929–2023)

- Born: Andrew James McKenna; September 17, 1929; Chicago, Illinois, U.S.
- Died: February 7, 2023 (aged 93); North Shore, Illinois, U.S.
- Education: University of Notre Dame; DePaul University College of Law
- Title: Chairman Emeritus, McDonald's
- Term: May 2016 – February 2023
- Successor: Enrique Hernandez Jr.
- Board member of: McDonald's; Chicago Bears; Aon
- Spouse: Mary Pickett (m. 1953)
- Children: 7, including Andrew J. McKenna Jr.

Andrew James McKenna Sr. (September 17, 1929 – February 7, 2023) was an American businessman and chairman emeritus of McDonald's from 2016 until his death, having been chairman from 2004 to 2016, and a director from 1991.

== Early life ==
McKenna was born in Chicago, Illinois on September 17, 1929. He graduated from the University of Notre Dame with a bachelor's degree in business administration and marketing, followed by a Doctor of Jurisprudence degree from DePaul University College of Law.

== Career ==
McKenna was chairman of McDonald's from 2004 to 2016. He was a director of the Chicago Bears, Aon, and Skyline Corporation. McKenna and Patrick Ryan, chairman of Aon together owned 19.7% of the Chicago Bears.

McKenna owned Schwarz Supply Source Inc, a Morton Grove-based paper company, which is a supplier to McDonald's, "making him something less than totally independent", according to Crain's Chicago Business.

== Personal life and death ==
McKenna married Mary Joan Pickett on June 20, 1953, and they had five daughters and two sons. His son Andrew J. McKenna Jr. is a former chairman of the Illinois Republican Party.

McKenna died in Winnetka, Illinois on February 7, 2023, at the age of 93.

== Awards ==
McKenna was inducted as a laureate of The Lincoln Academy of Illinois and awarded the Order of Lincoln (the State's highest honor) by the Governor of Illinois in 2000 in the area of Social Services.
