= Dan Duffy =

American politician

Member of the Illinois Senate from the 26th district
- In office January 14, 2009 – April 3, 2016
- Preceded by: William E. Peterson
- Succeeded by: Dan McConchie

Personal details
- Born: March 11, 1966 (age 60) Chicago, Illinois
- Party: Republican
- Spouse: Kris Duffy
- Children: Five children
- Education: Augustana College (B.A.)
- Profession: Businessman

Dan Duffy (born March 11, 1966) is a former Republican member of the Illinois Senate. He represented the 26th Senate District which includes Barrington, Barrington Hills, North Barrington, Libertyville, Mundelein, Lake Zurich, Fox River Grove, Lakewood Hills, Cary, Hawthorn Woods, Lake in the Hills, Cuba and Kildeer.

On September 10, 2015, Duffy announced he would not be running for a third term. He resigned after his endorsed successor won the Republican primary.

== Early life, education, and career ==
Duffy grew up on the south side of Chicago, the youngest of 11 children. He graduated from Augustana College in Rock Island, Illinois with a bachelor's degree in speech communication. After college, he moved to the northwest suburbs where he eventually moved to Lake Barrington with his wife Kris, with whom he has five children. Duffy became a board member of the National Federation of Independent Businesses Leadership Council (NFIB) of Illinois and became the Chairman of the Lake and Cook County Area Action Council for independent businesses. He was a co-owner of Effective Data, Inc. located in Schaumburg, Illinois.

== Illinois Senate ==
Duffy was elected to the Illinois Senate in 2008 defeating then-Round Lake Mayor Bill Gentes by sixteen points in what was originally seen to be a competitive race. He succeeded William E. Peterson, who retired after sixteen years in the Illinois Senate.

As a member of the Senate, Duffy was a co-sponsor of the bill that abolished the death penalty in Illinois.

Duffy endorsed Dave McSweeney over incumbent Representative Kent Gaffney in the 2012 Republican primary and was one of the first legislators to endorse Bruce Rauner in the 2014 Republican primary. He has endorsed Dan McConchie to succeed him in the Illinois Senate.

Duffy resigned from the Illinois Senate on April 3, 2016 in order to take the position of president and CEO of Prevent Childhood Abuse America.

=== Committee assignments ===
He serves on the following committees: Appropriations I, Commerce & Economic Development, Insurance, Labor, Public Health and the Committee on Pension Investments. He is also a past member of the Illinois Legislative Research Unit.
