= Dan McConchie =

American politician

- McConchie in 2020

Minority Leader of the Illinois Senate
- In office January 13, 2021 – January 11, 2023
- Preceded by: Bill Brady
- Succeeded by: John Curran

Member of the Illinois Senate from the 26th district
- In office April 20, 2016 – February 2, 2025
- Preceded by: Dan Duffy
- Succeeded by: Darby Hills

Personal details
- Born: 1972 (age 53–54)
- Party: Republican
- Spouse: Milena (died 2025)
- Children: 2
- Education: Central Bible College (BA); Trinity Evangelical Divinity School (MA)
- Website: Official website

Military service
- Allegiance: United States
- Branch/service: United States Army
- Unit: Illinois Army National Guard

Daniel McConchie is a former Republican member of the Illinois Senate. He represented the 26th Senate District which includes Algonquin, Barrington, Cary, Deer Park, Fox River Grove, Hawthorn Woods, Hoffman Estates, Island Lake, Kildeer, Lake Zurich, Libertyville, Long Grove, Mundelein, and Wauconda.

== Early life, education and military service ==
At age nine, McConchie went door-to-door to his neighbors offering to do odd jobs. He started his first business when he was 15 years old and a second one while in college.

McConchie joined the Illinois Army National Guard on his 17th birthday, and he served in the Guard for nine years as an infantryman and a military policeman.

McConchie holds a bachelor's degree from Central Bible College in Springfield, Missouri, and a master's degree from Trinity Evangelical Divinity School in Deerfield, Illinois.

== Career ==
Prior to his campaign for and subsequent appointment to the Illinois Senate, McConchie served as vice president for Americans United for Life. In the years prior to his first campaign, McConchie had been asked to run for public office but declined.

McConchie is the senior advisor for the Public Sector division at The Shelby Group, a company that works to optimize procurement operations. He serves on the Board of Regents for The Fund for American Studies, an international group that trains young people in leadership, and also serves on the Board of Directors of Informed Choices Pregnancy & Parenting.

=== Illinois Senate ===
After originally running for the Illinois House of Representatives, McConchie announced he would run to replace Dan Duffy for 26th Senate District after the latter announced that he would be retiring. He defeated two other candidates in the March 15, 2016 primary election, winning 36.6% of the vote to opponent Casey Urlacher's 32.8% and Martin McLaughlin's 30.6%. In April 2016, McConchie was subsequently appointed to the district after Duffy chose to retire early, and he opened his Senate office on July 27, 2016. In the 2016 general election, McConchie defeated Democratic challenger Kelly Mazeski with over 59 percent of the vote.

On November 5, 2020, McConchie was selected as Senate Republican Leader-elect for the 102nd General Assembly, and he was confirmed to the position on January 13, 2021. On November 15, 2022, shortly after the 2022 Illinois Senate election, McConchie was not re-elected by his caucus to serve as the Illinois Senate Minority Leader. He was succeeded by John Curran. On January 27, 2025, McConchie announced he would resign from the Illinois Senate effective February 2, 2025.

==== Committees ====
McConchie was assigned to the following committees: Approp- Health and Human; Education (Minority Spokesperson); Human Rights (Minority Spokesperson); Insurance; Labor; Transportation; Chicago Elected Rep. School Board (Minority Spokesperson).

==== Legislation ====
In 2016, McConchie sponsored a bill signed into law that expanded voting rights in party primaries for 17-year-olds who would turn 18 by the date of the general election.

In January 2022, McConchie reintroduced four amendments to the Illinois Constitution that he called the "Voter Empowerment Project". The amendments would change legislative redistricting and make it easier for voters to introduce constitutional amendments, referendums and recalls of elected officials.

== Political positions ==
According to his campaign, McConchie supports reforming the state's pension system. McConchie supports freezing property taxes and opposes increasing taxes. On issues of transportation, McConchie opposes traffic cameras. He supports charter schools and education vouchers. He also supports limits on partisan redistricting, and term limits for legislators.

== Personal life ==
McConchie lives in Hawthorn Woods, Illinois with his two children and is a member of Heritage Church in Lake Zurich. McConchie met his wife Milena in Prague, Czech Republic. She died on February 21, 2025, of heart failure due to long-term cancer stemming from exposure to radiation caused by the Chernobyl disaster.

In 2007, McConchie was injured in a motorcycle crash by a hit-and-run driver. As a result of the collision, he uses a wheelchair.

== Electoral history ==
2016 Illinois State Senate District 26 General Election
Party	Candidate	Votes	%
Republican	Dan McConchie	63,432	59.19
Democratic	Kelly Mazeski	43,738	40.81
Total votes		107,170	100.0

2018 Illinois State Senate District 26 General Election
Party	Candidate	Votes	%
Republican	Dan McConchie	51,754	54.7
Democratic	Tom Georges	42,924	45.3
Total votes		94,678	100.0

2022 Illinois State Senate District 26 General Election
Party	Candidate	Votes	%
Republican	Dan McConchie	44,632	50.22%
Democratic	Maria Peterson	44,247	49.78%
Total votes		88,879	100.0

Illinois Senate
Preceded by Bill Brady	Minority Leader of the Illinois Senate; 2021–2023	Succeeded by John Curran
