= Helene Walsh =

American politician

Member of the Illinois House of Representatives from the 51st district
- In office August 18, 2018 – January 9, 2019
- Preceded by: Nick Sauer
- Succeeded by: Mary Edly-Allen

Personal details
- Party: Republican
- Spouse: Joe Walsh
- Children: 2
- Education: Occidental College

Helene Walsh is an American politician and former Republican member of the Illinois House of Representatives. She represented the 51st district via an appointment in August 2018 to replace the outgoing State Representative Nick Sauer. The 51st district includes all or parts of Barrington, Deer Park, Forest Lake, Green Oaks, Hawthorn Woods, Kildeer, Lake Barrington, Lake Zurich, Libertyville, Long Grove, Mundelein and North Barrington.

Mary Edly-Allen, a teacher from Libertyville, defeated Walsh in the 2018 general election.

Walsh is married to the former Congressman Joe Walsh. She has sat on the advisory board of Project HOOD for five years, the Haym Solomon Center board of directors since 2017, and is the COO of Leenie Productions.
