= Nick Sauer =

American politician

Member of the Illinois House of Representatives from the 51st district
- In office January 11, 2017 – August 1, 2018
- Preceded by: Ed Sullivan, Jr.
- Succeeded by: Helene Walsh

Personal details
- Born: October 11, 1982 (age 43) Peoria, Illinois
- Party: Republican
- Education: Northwestern University (M.A.); University of Denver (B.A.)

Nick Sauer (born October 11, 1982) is a Republican politician and former member of the Illinois House of Representatives, representing the 51st district which includes Deer Park, Forest Lake, Green Oaks, Hawthorn Woods, Kildeer, Lake Barrington, Lake Zurich, Libertyville, Long Grove, Mundelein and North Barrington. Before his election to the House, he was a director of the Illinois State Toll Highway Authority and a member of the Lake County Board.

== Professional and political career ==
Sauer began his professional career in the US Department of Commerce under President George W Bush. In 2009, he was victorious in his first campaign for elected office, to the Barrington, Illinois Community School District 220 Board of Education. He successfully ran for the Lake County, Illinois Board in 2012 and was elected as a State Representative in 2016. He is a partner in his family's business, called "Sauer Kitchen Solutions."

== Sexual harassment allegations ==
On August 1, 2018, it was reported by Politico that an ex-girlfriend accused him of misappropriating nude photos she had sent to him privately, using them to establish an Instagram account, where he would pretend to be a woman seeking online relationships with men. This allegedly involved graphic sexual discussions. "He came to my house & confessed to catfishing men with my photos for 2 years to at least 8 men," she said, according to Politico. "He was unable to provide the names and begged that I let it go." He resigned from the Illinois General Assembly the same day. Lake County Republican Party Chairman Mark Shaw appointed Helene Walsh, wife of former Congressman Joe Walsh, to the vacancy.

On January 9, 2019, it was announced that Sauer was indicted on twelve counts of the offense of non-consensual Dissemination of Private Sexual Images involving two separate victims. As charged, each count is a Class 4 felony.

In November 2023, Sauer entered into a plea agreement in which he pled guilty to one charge of attempted non-consensual dissemination of a private sexual image (a Class A misdemeanor) while the rest of the charges were dismissed. He was sentenced to 90 days in jail, two years probation and 120 hours of public service.
