= David McSweeney (politician) =

American politician

Member of the Illinois House of Representatives from the 52nd district
- In office January 9, 2013 – January 13, 2021
- Preceded by: Kent Gaffney
- Succeeded by: Martin McLaughlin

Personal details
- Born: 1965 (age 60–61) Park Ridge, Illinois, U.S.
- Party: Republican
- Spouse: Margaret
- Children: 2
- Education: Duke University
- Profession: investment specialist

David McSweeney (born 1965) is a Republican politician and investment specialist from Barrington Hills, Illinois. He served in the Illinois House of Representatives from 2013 to 2021.

== Early life, education, and career ==
McSweeney was born in Park Ridge, Illinois and attended Barrington High School (Lake County, Illinois). He earned a Bachelor of Arts degree in economics from Duke University in 1987 and a master of business administration degree from the Fuqua School of Business in 1988. He has worked as an investment banker, financial consultant, and currently as an investment specialist, working for Banc of America Securities until April 2005. He has claimed a net worth in the millions.

== Political career ==
In 1998, McSweeney unsuccessfully challenged incumbent Republican Phil Crane in the Republican primary for the 8th Congressional District in the 1998 United States House of Representatives elections. McSweeney was the Republican nominee in Illinois's 8th congressional district in 2006. He won in the six-way primary but lost to Melissa Bean in the general election with 44% of the vote to Bean's 51%.

In 2012 McSweeney was elected to the Illinois State Legislature, representing the 52nd Illinois State House District. McSweeney won the Republican nomination over incumbent Kent Gaffney, who had been appointed to the seat after the death of incumbent Mark Beaubien. In the general election, McSweeney defeated Beaubien's widow, Dee Beaubien, who ran as an independent. No Democrat filed for the seat. McSweeney won re-election in 2014 against Democrat Bill Downs with 70 percent of the vote. McSweeney won re-election in 2016 after running unopposed.

On September 5, 2019, McSweeney announced he would not run for reelection to the Illinois House of Representatives and instead focus on running for either United States Senate against Tammy Duckworth or for Illinois Secretary of State. He was succeeded in the Illinois House by fellow Republican Martin McLaughlin.

== Political positions ==
On April 15, 2013, McSweeney filed a House resolution opposing a graduated income tax in Illinois. McSweeney also led the charge to oppose extending Illinois' income tax hike beyond the 2015 sunset date. He considers himself a strong conservative in both the fiscal and social sense. Rep. McSweeney is Lutheran.

In 2014, McSweeney co-sponsored HB 983 which helps prevent local governments from issuing bonds for projects that could result in higher property taxes. The measure went into effect on January 1, 2014. In the spring of 2015, McSweeney introduced a measure to freeze property taxes for one year in townships with less than 100,000 people.

In January 2015, McSweeney sponsored HB 173 to ban red light cameras. The legislation included a compromise that exempted the City of Chicago. House Bill 173 passed the Illinois House with 79 votes.

McSweeney sponsored a bill that was signed into law on July 26, 2016, that restricted the amount of money that non-home-rule local governments can spend on traveling, meals, and lodging, and bans spending on entertainment.

McSweeney supports capital punishment. In 2019, after two mass shootings in the U.S., McSweeney said he would either sponsor or co-sponsor a measure overturning the moratorium former Governor Pat Quinn placed on capital punishment eight years prior.

== Electoral history ==
Illinois 8th Congressional District Republican Primary, 1998
Party	Candidate	Votes	%
Republican	Philip M. Crane (incumbent)	34,543	65.47
Republican	S. David McSweeney	18,221	34.53
Total votes		52,764	100.0

Illinois 8th Congressional District Republican Primary, 2006
Party	Candidate	Votes	%
Republican	David McSweeney	25,085	42.92
Republican	Kathy Salvi	19,370	33.14
Republican	Robert W. Churchill	9,169	15.69
Republican	Aaron B. Lincoln	2,630	4.50
Republican	Ken Arnold	1,275	2.18
Republican	James Creighton Mitchell Jr.	921	1.58
Total votes		58,450	100.0

Illinois 8th Congressional District General Election, 2006
Party	Candidate	Votes	%
Democratic	Melissa Bean (incumbent)	93,355	50.90
Republican	David McSweeney	80,720	44.01
Moderate	Bill Scheurer	9,312	5.08
Write-in votes	Jonathan Farnick	7	0.00
Total votes		183,394	100.0

Illinois 52nd State House District Republican Primary, 2012
Party	Candidate	Votes	%
Republican	David McSweeney	4,762	41.33
Republican	Kent Gaffney (incumbent)	3,985	34.59
Republican	Danielle Rowe	2,775	24.08
Total votes		11,522	100.0

Illinois 52nd State House District General Election, 2012
Party	Candidate	Votes	%
Republican	David McSweeney	26,761	59.27
Independent	Dee Beaubien	18,392	40.73
Total votes		45,153	100.0

Illinois 52nd State House District General Election, 2014
Party	Candidate	Votes	%
Republican	David McSweeney (incumbent)	22,676	69.59
Democratic	Bill Downs	9,911	30.41
Total votes		32,587	100.0

Illinois 52nd State House District General Election, 2016
Party	Candidate	Votes	%
Republican	David McSweeney (incumbent)	40,392	99.97
Write-in votes	Chris Bauman	11	0.03
Total votes		40,403	100.0

Illinois 52nd State House District General Election, 2018
Party	Candidate	Votes	%
Republican	David McSweeney (incumbent)	30,399	100.0
Total votes		30,399	100.0
