= Chris Bos =

American politician

Member of the Illinois House of Representatives from the 51st district
- In office January 13, 2021 – January 11, 2023
- Preceded by: Mary Edly-Allen
- Succeeded by: Nabeela Syed

Personal details
- Born: June 30, 1978 (age 48)
- Party: Republican
- Education: North Central University
- Profession: Non profit executive

Chris Bos is an American politician who, as a Republican, served as a representative for the Illinois House of Representatives for the 51st district until January 2023. The 51st district, located in the Chicago area, includes all or parts of Arlington Heights, Barrington, Barrington Hills, Buffalo Grove, Deer Park, Forest Lake, Grayslake, Green Oaks, Gurnee, Hawthorn Woods, Kildeer, Lake Barrington, Lake Zurich, Libertyville, Long Grove, Mettawa, Mundelein, North Barrington, Tower Lakes, Vernon Hills, Wauconda, and Waukegan.

In the 2020 general election, Bos defeated the Democratic incumbent Mary Edly-Allen. In the 2022 midterm elections, Bos was defeated by Democratic challenger Nabeela Syed.

As of July 3, 2022, Representative Bos is a member of the following Illinois House committees:

- Adoption & Child Welfare Committee (HACW)
- Appropriations - Public Safety Committee (HAPP)
- Housing Committee (SHOU)
- Judiciary - Criminal Committee (HJUC)
- Mental Health & Addiction Committee (HMEH)
- Police & Fire Committee (SHPF)

== Electoral history ==
Illinois 51st State House District Republican Primary, 2020
Party	Candidate	Votes	%
Republican	Chris Bos	5,444	100.0
Total votes		5,444	100.0

Illinois 51st State House District General Election, 2020
Party	Candidate	Votes	%
Republican	Chris Bos	33,697	50.87
Democratic	Mary Edly-Allen (incumbent)	32,548	49.13
Total votes		66,245	100.0

Illinois 51st State House District General Election, 2022
Party	Candidate	Votes	%
Democratic	Nabeela Syed	23,775	53.28%
Republican	Chris Bos	20,847	46.72%
Total votes			
