= John Curran (Illinois politician) =

Republican member of the Illinois Senate

Minority Leader of the Illinois Senate
- Incumbent
- Assumed office January 11, 2023
- Preceded by: Dan McConchie

Member of the Illinois Senate from the 41st district
- Incumbent
- Assumed office July 23, 2017
- Preceded by: Christine Radogno

Personal details
- Party: Republican
- Education: University of Illinois, Urbana-Champaign (BA); Northern Illinois University (JD)
- Website: Official website

John Curran is a Republican member of the Illinois Senate. He took office in July 2017 after accepting an appointment to replace Senate Minority Leader Christine Radogno who resigned July 1, 2017. He represents the 41st district which includes all or parts of Lemont, Indian Head Park, LaGrange Western Springs, Homer Glen, Burr Ridge, Darien, Downers Grove, Lisle, Willowbrook, Woodridge, Naperville, and Bolingbrook.

Curran has served as the Minority leader in the Illinois Senate since January 11, 2023.

== Electoral career ==
Curran began his political career as a Woodridge Village Trustee and member of the DuPage County Board, where he served as vice chair. Curran received his bachelor's degree from the University of Illinois at Urbana Champaign and his law degree from Northern Illinois University College of Law. Following 19 years working as an Assistant State's Attorney in the Cook County State's Attorney's Office, Curran now works as an attorney at a private law firm in Oak Brook.

== Illinois Senate ==
On November 15, 2022, after Republicans underperformed in the 2022 Illinois Senate election, Curran was unanimously elected by his caucus to succeed Dan McConchie as the new Illinois Senate Minority Leader.

=== Committees ===
Curran serves on the following committees: Executive; Judiciary; Special Issues; Cannabis.

== Personal life ==
In addition to his legal work and public service, Curran sits on the Board of Directors for the Downers Grove Economic Development Corporation, which has a mission of helping retain, expand and attract new businesses to the Village of Downers Grove.

Curran, his wife, Sue, their four daughters and a niece live in Downers Grove.

== Electoral history ==
2022 General Election for Illinois State Senate District 41
Party	Candidate	Votes	%
Republican	John Curran	64,100	100.0
Total votes		64,100	100.0

2018 General Election for Illinois State Senate District 41
Party	Candidate	Votes	%
Republican	John Curran	49,692	50.8
Democratic	Bridget Fitzgerald	48,046	49.2
Total votes		97,738	100.0

Illinois Senate
Preceded by Dan McConchie	Minority Leader of the Illinois Senate; 2023–present	Incumbent
