= Martin McLaughlin (politician) =

American politician

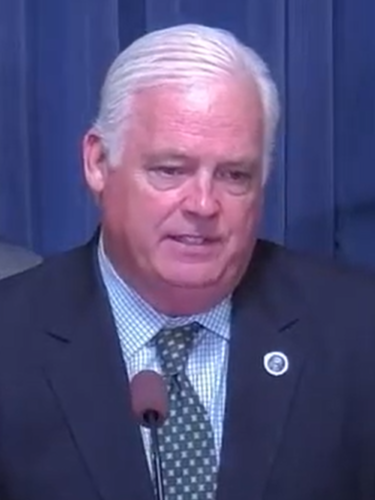
- McLaughlin at press conference in 2025

Member of the Illinois House of Representatives from the 52nd district
- Incumbent
- Assumed office January 13, 2021
- Preceded by: David McSweeney
- Succeeded by: Maria Peterson (elect)

Village President of Barrington Hills
- In office 2013–2021
- Preceded by: Robert Abboud
- Succeeded by: Brian Cecola

Personal details
- Party: Republican
- Spouse: Married
- Children: 5
- Education: Illinois Wesleyan University
- Occupation: Businessman
- Website: https://repmclaughlin.com/

Martin J. McLaughlin is a Republican member of the Illinois House of Representatives from the 52nd district. The 52nd district, located in the Chicago metropolitan area, includes all or parts of Algonquin, Barrington, Barrington Hills, Mundelein, South Barrington, and Wauconda. He served as the village president of Barrington Hills, Illinois prior to his service in the Illinois House.

== Early and personal life ==
He received a Bachelor's Degree in Business Administration from Illinois Wesleyan University. Martin and his wife Kathleen have 5 daughters. He served as village president.

== Local political career ==
In 2013, McLaughlin filed to run against the incumbent president of the Village of Barrington Hills, Robert Abboud. McLaughlin defeated Abboud in the election. While village president, he served as the chairman of the Barrington Area Council of Governments. McLaughlin did not file to run for reelection in the 2021 election after winning election to the Illinois House of Representatives. Brian Cecola was elected in the 2021 local election to succeed him.

== State political career ==
In 2016, McLaughlin ran for District 26 of the Illinois Senate; he was defeated in the primary by Dan McConchie. A year later he won reelection as the village president of Barrington Hills. He ran again for the General Assembly in 2020, this time winning a seat as Representative for the 52nd House District. He was reelected in 2022 and narrowly won a third term in 2024.

=== Committee assignments ===
McLaughlin has been assigned to the following committees.

==== 2023-2024 ====
McLaughlin was assigned to the following committees:

- Appropriations - General Service Committee (HAPG)
- Cybersecurity, Data Analytics, & IT Committee (HCDA)
- Ethics & Elections Committee (SHEE)
- Judiciary - Civil Committee (HJUA)
- Prescription Drug Affordability Committee (HPDA)
- Revenue & Finance Committee (HREF)

==== 2021-2022 ====
McLaughlin was assigned to the following committees:

- Appropriations - General Service Committee (HAPG)
- Commercial & Property Subcommittee (HJUA-COMM)
- Cybersecurity, Data Analytics, & IT Committee (HCDA)
- Ethics & Elections Committee (SHEE)
- Judiciary - Civil Committee (HJUA)
- Prescription Drug Affordability Committee (HPDA)
- Property Tax Subcommittee (HREF-PRTX)
- Revenue & Finance Committee (HREF)

=== Electoral history ===
Illinois 52nd State House District General Election, 2020
Party	Candidate	Votes	%
Republican	Martin McLaughlin	31,426	54.27
Democratic	Marci Suelzer	24,962	43.11
Green	Alla Sarfraz	1,521	2.63
Total votes		57,909	100.0

Illinois 52nd State House District General Election, 2022
Party	Candidate	Votes	%
Republican	Martin McLaughlin (incumbent)	23,088	52.3
Democratic	Mary Morgan	21,059	47.7
Total votes		57,909	100.0

Illinois 52nd State House District General Election, 2024
Party	Candidate	Votes	%
Republican	Martin McLaughlin (incumbent)	29,520	50.0
Democratic	Maria Peterson	29,473	50.0
Total votes		58,993	100.0
