= Mary Edly-Allen =

American politician

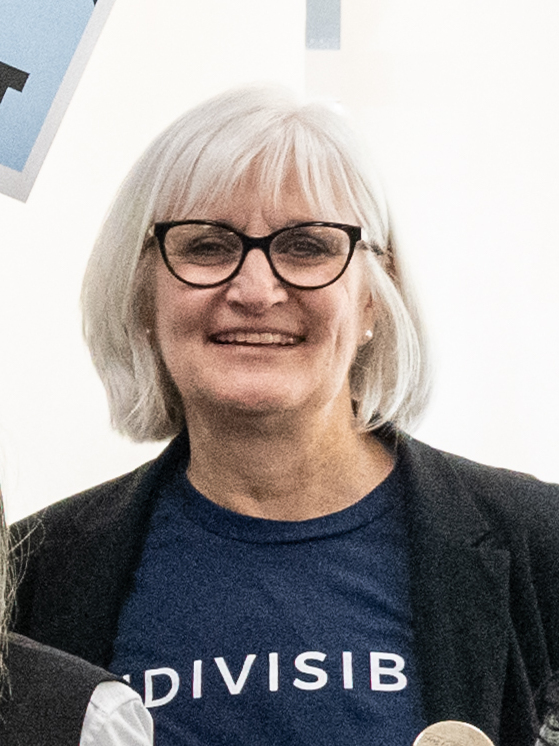
- Edly-Allen in 2025

Member of the Illinois Senate from the 31st district
- Incumbent
- Assumed office January 11, 2023
- Preceded by: Melinda Bush

Member of the Illinois House of Representatives from the 51st district
- In office January 9, 2019 – January 13, 2021
- Preceded by: Helene Walsh
- Succeeded by: Chris Bos

Personal details
- Born: Chicago, Illinois, U.S.
- Party: Democratic
- Profession: Educator, politician

Mary Edly-Allen is an American politician and educator serving as a member of the Illinois Senate for the 31st district since 2023. She previously served as a member of the Illinois House of Representatives for the 51st district from 2019 to 2021.

== Career ==
A teacher from Libertyville, Edly-Allen was elected to the Illinois House of Representatives in 2018, defeating appointed Republican incumbent Helene Walsh. She served one term before losing reelection in 2020 to Republican Chris Bos.

In 2022, she ran for the Illinois Senate and won the election for the 31st district, succeeding Melinda Bush.

== Electoral history ==
Illinois 31st State Senate District General Election, 2022
Party	Candidate	Votes	%
Democratic	Mary Edly-Allen	55,678	51.2
Republican	Adam Solano	53,105	48.8
Total votes		108,783	100.0

Illinois 51st State House District General Election, 2020
Party	Candidate	Votes	%
Republican	Chris Bos	33,697	50.87
Democratic	Mary Edly-Allen (incumbent)	32,548	49.13
Total votes		66,245	100.0

Illinois 51st State House District General Election, 2018
Party	Candidate	Votes	%
Democratic	Mary Edly-Allen	25,950	50.36
Republican	Helene Walsh (incumbent)	25,576	49.64
Total votes		51,526	100.0
