= Jenny Levin =

American politician

Member-elect of the Illinois House of Representatives from the 51st district
- Assuming office January 2027
- Succeeding: Nabeela Syed

Personal details
- Party: Democratic

Jenny Levin is an American politician. A member of the Democratic Party, she is the member-elect for the 51st district of the Illinois House of Representatives.
