= William E. Peterson =

American politician and educator (1936–2026)

Member of the Illinois Senate from the 26th district
- In office 1993–2009
- Preceded by: Greg Zito
- Succeeded by: Dan Duffy

Member of the Illinois House of Representatives
- In office 1983–1993
- Preceded by: District created

Personal details
- Born: February 2, 1936 Chicago, Illinois, U.S.
- Died: January 11, 2026 (aged 89)
- Party: Republican
- Profession: Educator

William E. Peterson (February 2, 1936 – January 11, 2026) was an American politician and educator who served as a member of the Illinois Senate from 1993 to 2009. He also served as the Assistant Minority Leader.

== Early life and career ==
William E. Peterson was born on February 2, 1936, in Chicago. Peterson served on the school board in Elmwood Park, Illinois before moving to the north suburbs. He taught at schools in Northbrook and Highland Park. He graduated from Schurz High School in 1956. After receiving his associate’s degree from Wright Junior College, he enlisted in the United States Army. He was stationed for a time in Okinawa. He then completed his bachelor’s degree at North Park College in 1960, his Master's Degree in Education at Northern Illinois University in 1965.

He was appointed to the township board of trustees for Vernon Township in 1973 and served from 1973 to 1977. He was then elected township supervisor, defeating incumbent supervisor Michael Zimmer for the position. He served as supervisor while simultaneously serving in the Illinois General Assembly. He remained in the office after retiring from the Illinois Senate, retiring in 2017.

== Illinois General Assembly ==
Peterson previously served in the Illinois House of Representatives from 1983 to 1993. He served in the Illinois Senate from 1993 to 2009. For part of his time in the Illinois Senate, his committee responsibilities were: Senate Committee of all; Insurance; Human Services; Local Government; Housing and Community Affairs (Minority Spokesperson); Executive; Labor. Peterson had announced that he would not seek reelection in 2008. Republican candidate Dan Duffy of Lake Barrington defeated Bill Gentes, the mayor of Round Lake, in the November 4, 2008 election.

== Death ==
Peterson died on January 11, 2026, at the age of 89.
