= Robert Raica =

American politician

Robert M. Raica (born March 13, 1954) was a Republican member of the Illinois Senate from 1987 to 1997.

Prior to holding elected office, Raica was assistant chief paramedic with the Chicago Fire Department. Raica defeated Democratic incumbent LeRoy Lemke in the 1986 general election in a racially-charged campaign targeting Reagan Democrats on the issues of crime and taxes. Raica defeated William F. Krystyniak, a member of the Chicago City Council from the 23rd ward, in the 1988 general election. For a time during his tenure in the Senate, he served as the Chair of the Committee on Public Health and Welfare. Raica lost the 1996 Republican primary to then-Village Trustee Christine Radogno of LaGrange. On February 21, 2021, Raica submitted his name to the Democratic Committeepersons of the 22nd legislative district for consideration to be appointed to the vacant State Representative position.
