= Greg Zito =

American politician (1953–2025)

Member of the Illinois Senate from the 26th district
- In office 1983–1991
- Preceded by: James C. Taylor
- Succeeded by: William E. Peterson

Member of the Illinois House of Representatives
- In office 1981–1983

Personal details
- Born: March 7, 1953 Oak Park, Illinois, U.S.
- Died: April 2, 2025 (aged 72)
- Party: Democratic
- Children: 1
- Education: Triton College (AA); Illinois State University (BA)

Gregory Alan Zito (March 7, 1953 – April 2, 2025) was an American businessman, lobbyist, and politician who served as a member of the Illinois General Assembly.

== Early life and education ==
Born in Oak Park, Illinois, Zito attended Triton College. He then received his bachelor's degree in politician science and public administration from Illinois State University.

== Career ==
Zito served in the Illinois House of Representatives from 1981 to 1983 and the Illinois Senate from 1983 to 1991. After leaving office, he was succeeded by William E. Peterson. He was a Democrat.

After leaving the Illinois Senate in 1991, Zito began working as a lobbyist for Household Finance Group Ltd. He later became the sales director for RedSpeed, a British organization that manufactured red light cameras.

In 1994 and 1995, Zito was investigated for allegedly using leftover campaign funds to pay himself a salary and purchase a home in Wayne, Illinois.

== Personal life and death ==
In 2018, Zito's son, Nic Zito, was an unsuccessful candidate for District 49 in the Illinois House of Representatives. Zito died April 2, 2025, at the age of 72.
