= Christine Radogno =

American politician

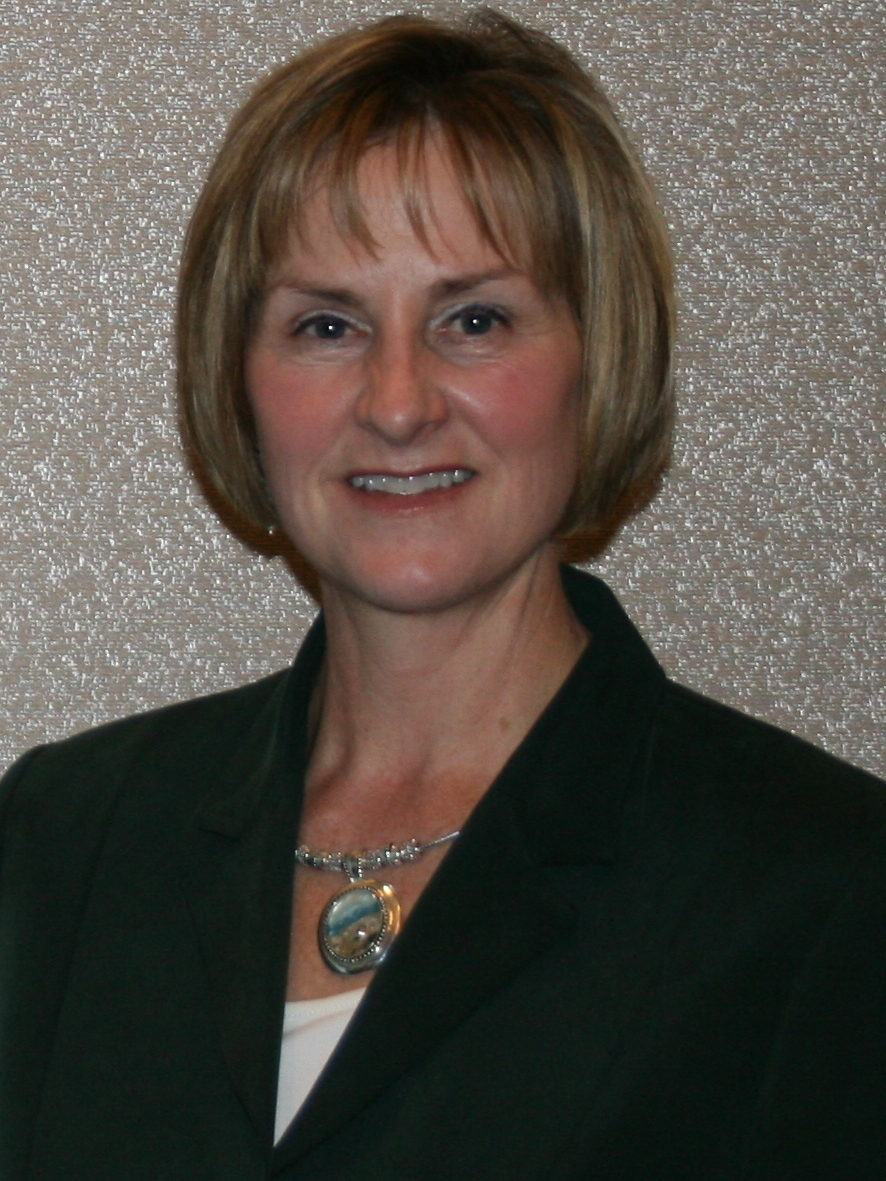

Minority Leader of the Illinois Senate
- In office February 2009 – July 1, 2017
- Preceded by: Frank Watson
- Succeeded by: Bill Brady

Member of the Illinois Senate from the 41st district
- In office January 4, 2003 – July 1, 2017
- Preceded by: Kirk Dillard
- Succeeded by: John Curran

Member of the Illinois Senate from the 24th district
- In office January 8, 1997 – January 4, 2003
- Preceded by: Robert Raica
- Succeeded by: Kirk Dillard

Personal details
- Born: December 21, 1952 (age 73) Oak Park, Illinois, U.S.
- Party: Republican
- Spouse: Nunzio Radogno
- Children: 3
- Education: Loyola University, Chicago

Christine Radogno (born December 21, 1952) is an American politician and former Republican member of the Illinois Senate, representing the 41st Legislative District in Cook, DuPage, and Will Counties from 1997 to 2017. Radogno served as the Minority Leader, the first female leader of a political party in the Illinois Legislature. She resigned from the Illinois State Senate on July 1, 2017 amid the Illinois budget crisis.

== Early life, education and career ==
Radogno was educated in the Chicago area. She graduated from Lyons Township High School. She received both her Bachelor's and Master's degree in Social Work from Loyola University Chicago.

Before entering politics, she worked as a social worker at Mercy Center for Health Care Services. Her interest in politics began when she decided to prevent the opening of a fire station on her street, and Radogno ran successfully for Village of LaGrange Trustee (1989–1996). In 1996, she ran for the Illinois State Senate and narrowly defeated incumbent Robert Raica in the Republican primary. In 2006, she was the Republican nominee for Illinois State Treasurer and was defeated by Democrat Alexi Giannoulias.

On October 12, 2015, she was named as Illinois state chair of John Kasich's presidential campaign.

On July 1, 2017, Rodagno resigned from the state Senate.

== Illinois Senate ==
Her committee memberships include:

- Committee on Rules (Minority Spokesperson)
- Human Services (Minority Spokesperson)
- Appropriations I
- Appropriations II
- Appropriations III
- Executive
- Public Health
- Commission on Government Forecasting and Accountability

== Personal life ==
Radogno lives with her husband, Nunzio, in Lemont, Illinois. They have three adult daughters, one of whom, Lisa, was struck by a car on May 8, 2014 in Washington, D. C. and died on June 18.

Party political offices
Preceded by Judy Baar Topinka	Republican nominee for Illinois Treasurer; 2006	Succeeded by Dan Rutherford
