= Pat Brady (politician) =

American politician

Chair of Illinois Republican Party
- In office 2009 – May 7, 2013
- Preceded by: Andrew McKenna
- Succeeded by: Jack Dorgan

Personal details
- Party: Republican
- Occupation: Business

Pat Brady is the former chairman for the Illinois Republican Party, and a former federal and state prosecutor. Brady became the chairman in 2009 when Andrew McKenna resigned to run for governor.

== Career ==
=== Prosecutor ===
Brady graduated from law school in 1987 and joined the Cook County State's Attorney's Office as a prosecutor. He later served as an Assistant United States Attorney with the U.S. Department of Justice in Washington, D.C., where he focused on white-collar financial crimes and public corruption cases, before returning to the Cook County office for a second stint. His two periods of prosecutorial service totaled nearly ten years.

In an interview on the Fox 32 Chicago show Wearing the Badge, Brady spoke about the money-laundering dimension of his white-collar work. He said that after 1990s federal sentencing guidelines increased the severity of money-laundering charges, he added money-laundering counts to white-collar crime cases to increase sentencing exposure for defendants.

== Politics ==
=== Republican National Committee and Illinois Republican Party ===
As chairman of the Illinois Republican Party during the 2010 election cycle, Brady hired Rodney Davis (later elected to represent Illinois's 13th congressional district) to manage the state party's inaugural statewide Victory program. Working in coordination with the Kirk for Senate campaign, the Illinois Victory Program recorded more than 4.4 million voter contacts. Republicans credited the program with contributing to the election of Mark Kirk to the U.S. Senate seat previously held by Barack Obama, the election of five new U.S. House members from Illinois, victories in two Illinois constitutional offices, and Republican gains in several down-ballot races in areas that had long favored Democratic candidates.

=== Support for gay marriage and resignation ===
In January 2013, after a tough 2012 election cycle for Republicans, Brady, citing the conservative principles of freedom and belief in the family structure, encouraged Republican members of the Illinois General Assembly to support proposed same-sex marriage legislation. Although he claimed to be urging support of same-sex marriage as a citizen only, and not in his official role as party chairman, the move was criticized by more conservative members of the Illinois Republican Party.

He resigned on May 7, 2013, after his embroilment in a fight over same-sex marriage with members of his party. He commented:

"I've been going at it hard for six years, I need to focus on my family, and obviously I had lost the support of the state Central Committee because of my position on gay marriage." Brady also cited his wife's ongoing battle with cancer.

On June 1, 2013, lobbyist Jack Dorgan, a vocal critic of Brady's same-sex marriage stance, was elected as Brady's successor.

=== Consulting and media ===
After his resignation as Illinois Republican Party chairman, Brady formed Next Generation Public Strategies, a Midwestern-based government affairs and media relations firm. The ACLU hired him to lobby Republican legislators in Illinois to pass the same-sex marriage legislation that led to his ouster as Illinois Republican Party chairman. The law passed in November 2013 and the governor signed the legislation into law on November 20, 2013 making Illinois the 15th state to have same-sex marriage.

=== Support for other candidates ===
Brady was an early supporter of Bruce Rauner, who defeated incumbent Democratic Governor Pat Quinn in the 2014 Illinois gubernatorial election before losing his bid for a second term to Democrat J. B. Pritzker in 2018.

In 2015, he was named as an Illinois state co-chair of John Kasich's presidential campaign.

== Personal life ==
Brady's wife Julie died of ovarian cancer on April 4, 2014.
