= Darby Hills =

American politician

Member of the Illinois Senate from the 26th district
- Incumbent
- Assumed office February 28, 2025
- Preceded by: Dan McConchie
- Succeeded by: Nabeela Syed (elect)

Personal details
- Born: Cary, Illinois
- Party: Republican
- Spouse: Tom Hills
- Children: 3
- Education: University of Iowa (BA); Chicago-Kent College of Law (JD)
- Website: Legislative website Campaign website

Darby Anne Hills is an American politician serving as a member of the Illinois Senate from the 26th district. She was appointed to the position on February 28, 2025, succeeding Dan McConchie, who resigned to lead a nonprofit advocacy group for people with disabilities.

== Early life and career ==
Hills was born in Cary, Illinois, where she stated she and her siblings were raised by a single mother who worked two jobs. Hills spent a year at Lake Forest College on a basketball scholarship before transferring to the University of Iowa to earn a Bachelor of Arts. She then graduated from the Chicago-Kent College of Law with a Juris Doctor.

Following law school, Hills joined the Cook County State's Attorney’s Office. She then worked as an employment attorney and practiced in immigration courts. She also co-founded nonprofit Barrington Children's Charities with her husband in 2010.

== Political career ==
In January 2022, Hills was appointed to the Barrington Hills village board to fill the unexpired term of trustee Debra Buettner, who died while in office.

In February 2025, Hills was appointed as to the Illinois Senate for the 26th district, succeeding Dan McConchie. Her appointment process faced legal challenges, requiring a second selection meeting by Republican leaders to choose her.

In 2026, Hills was unseated by Democratic candidate Nabeela Syed in the November general election. Hills won 42.1% of the total vote, with Syed winning 57.9%. According to Reform for Illinois, both candidates collectively raised $6.5 million dollars in campaign contributions, making the race one of the most expensive Illinois General Assembly races ever. According to the organization, Syed outraised Hills 2-1. The election marked a shift in the district's party control, ending a long-standing period of Republican representation.

== Personal life ==
Hills resides in Barrington Hills, Illinois, with her husband, Tom, and their three kids. She is the sister-in-law of Bret Baier, who is married to Tom's sister.

== Electoral history ==
Illinois 26th State Senate District General Election, 2026
Party	Candidate	Votes	%
Democratic	Nabeela Syed	51,569	57.9
Republican	Darby Hills	37,548	42.1
Total votes		89,117	100
