= Kent Gaffney =

American politician

Member of the Illinois House of Representatives from the 52nd district
- In office July 4, 2011 – December 2012
- Preceded by: Mark H. Beaubien, Jr.
- Succeeded by: David McSweeney

Personal details
- Party: Republican
- Spouse: Elizabeth
- Children: two
- Education: Purdue University; University of Illinois

Kent Gaffney (born January 3, 1967) was a Republican member of the Illinois House of Representatives from the 52nd district.

Gaffney has an undergraduate degree from Purdue University and did graduate studies at the University of Illinois. Prior to election to the legislature, Gaffney worked as the director of appropriations for the Republican Caucus in the Illinois Legislature. Gaffney and his wife Elizabeth are the parents of two children. Gaffney was appointed to succeed the late Mark H. Beaubien, Jr. by local Republican Party leaders on June 30, 2011 and officially took office July 4, 2011. Gaffney lost the March 2012 Republican primary to David McSweeney.
