= Andrew McKenna =

American politician

Andrew McKenna Jr.

Chair of Illinois Republican Party
- In office 2005–2009
- Preceded by: Judy Baar Topinka
- Succeeded by: Pat Brady

Personal details
- Born: Chicago, Illinois
- Party: Republican
- Spouse: Mary
- Children: Three daughters, one son
- Education: University of Notre Dame, Northwestern University
- Occupation: Business

Andrew McKenna Jr. is a former chairman of the Illinois Republican Party. McKenna became the chairman in 2005, and stepped down in August 2009. He was succeeded by Pat Brady. He was preceded by Judy Baar Topinka.

He is the son of Andrew J. McKenna, chairman of McDonald's since 2004.

McKenna ran in the 2004 Republican primary for U.S. Senate and the 2010 Republican primary election for governor.
