= Mark H. Beaubien Jr. =

American politician

Member of the Illinois House of Representatives from the 52nd district
- In office October 22, 1996 – June 5, 2011
- Preceded by: Al Salvi
- Succeeded by: Kent Gaffney

Personal details
- Born: October 30, 1942 Waukegan, Illinois
- Died: June 5, 2011 (aged 68) Arlington Heights, Illinois
- Party: Republican
- Spouse: Dee Beaubien
- Education: Northwestern University (BA, JD)
- Profession: attorney

Mark H. Beaubien Jr. (October 30, 1942 – June 5, 2011) was a Republican member of the Illinois House of Representatives. He represented the 52nd House district from 1996 to 2011, and prior to his death, served as Assistant Republican Leader.

He was a descendant of Mark Beaubien, the owner of Chicago's Sauganash Hotel.
