= Nabeela Syed =

American politician

- Syed in 2026

Member-elect of the Illinois Senate from the 26th district
- Assuming office January 13, 2027
- Succeeding: Darby Hills

Member of the Illinois House of Representatives from the 51st district
- Incumbent
- Assumed office January 11, 2023
- Preceded by: Chris Bos
- Succeeded by: Jenny Levin (elect)

Personal details
- Born: April 10, 1999 (age 27) Palatine, Illinois, U.S.
- Education: University of California, Berkeley

Nabeela Syed is an American politician serving as a Democratic member of the Illinois House of Representatives from the 51st district. She first won election to the seat in 2022, becoming the first Muslim and the first Indian-American elected to the Illinois State Legislature. Syed is the member-elect of the Illinois Senate from the 26th district, succeeding Darby Hills.

== Early life ==
Syed was born and raised in Palatine, Illinois. Her parents immigrated to Palatine from Hyderabad, India during the 1980s. Syed graduated from William Fremd High School, where she served on her school's Congressional Debate team and earned several accolades and awards. She is Muslim. She completed a bachelor's degree in political science from the University of California, Berkeley.

Syed said she was inspired to become involved in politics in 2016—when she was a senior in high school—by the anti-immigrant and anti-Muslim sentiment in the country at the time, associated with Donald Trump.

== Political career ==
In 2021, Syed served as Campaign Manager for Township High School District 211 School Board Member Tim McGowan. According to her LinkedIn profile, she served as a Marketing and Development intern at EMILY'S List.

Syed previously worked for the non-profit CivicNation as an assistant director of Digital Strategy. She is now a full-time legislator.

== Illinois House of Representatives ==
Syed ran for state representative for the 51st District in 2022, against incumbent Republican Chris Bos.

Syed said she ran for the House at the urging of her friend. In one of the tightest and closest-watched General Assembly races that year, Syed focused her campaign on abortion access, healthcare affordability, and property tax reform. Bos opposed abortion rights. Syed out-raised Bos nine to one.

Syed defeated Bos with 22,775 votes (53.28%) to the incumbent's 20,847 votes (46.72%).

=== Tenure ===
She took office on January 11, 2023. Elected at 23 years old, Syed is one of the youngest people and one of the only Muslims to ever serve in the General Assembly.

In 2026, Syed was the primary sponsor of Senate Bill 3496, a bill aimed at regulating the maximum price for certain prescription drugs sold in Illinois. Maximum drug prices would be set by an independent board, whose leadership would be appointed by the governor and the Illinois General Assembly. The board would determine maximums based on pricing averages, manufacturing cost, average copayments, accessibility and use, and other information. The bill was passed by the Illinois House of Representatives by a vote of 62-39.

== Illinois Senate ==
In 2026, Syed ran for Illinois Senate in the 26th district as a Democrat. She defeated Republican incumbent Darby Hills in the November general election, winning 57.9% of the vote. The election marked a shift in the district's party control, ending a long-standing period of Republican representation.

According to Reform for Illinois, both candidates collectively raised $6.5 million dollars in campaign contributions, making the race one of the most expensive Illinois General Assembly races ever. According to the organization, Syed outraised Hills 2-1.

On the campaign trail, Syed was critical of unregulated AI data center development. She expressed support for the Artificial Intelligence Safety Measures Act, which the Illinois legislature had passed earlier in the year. Syed also endorsed Governor JB Pritzker's decision to pause tax incentives for new data centers.

== Electoral history ==
=== 2022 ===
In 2022, Syed won the Democratic nomination and incumbent Chris Bos won the Republican nomination for the 51st district. In the general election, Syed defeated Bos with 22,775 votes (53.28%) to the incumbent's 20,847 votes (46.72%).

Illinois 51st State House District Democratic Primary, 2022
Party	Candidate	Votes	%
Democratic	Nabeela Syed	7,103	72.18
Democratic	Chelsea Laliberte Barnes	2,737	27.82
Total votes		9,840	100.0

Illinois 51st State House District General Election, 2022
Party	Candidate	Votes	%
Democratic	Nabeela Syed	23,775	53.28%
Republican	Chris Bos	20,847	46.72%
Total votes			

=== 2024 ===
Illinois 51st State House District General Election, 2024
Party	Candidate	Votes	%
Democratic	Nabeela Syed	32,311	56.18%
Republican	Tosi Ufodike	25,203	43.82%
Total votes			

=== 2026 ===
Illinois 26th State Senate District General Election, 2026
Party	Candidate	Votes	%
Democratic	Nabeela Syed	51,569	57.9
Republican	Darby Hills	37,548	42.1
Total votes		89,117	100
