= Ed Sullivan Jr. =

American politician

Member of the Illinois House of Representatives from the 51st district
- In office 2003 – January 11, 2017
- Succeeded by: Nick Sauer

Personal details
- Born: 1969 (age 56–57) Mundelein, Illinois, U.S.
- Party: Republican
- Spouse: Patricia (Trish)
- Education: University of Illinois

Ed Sullivan Jr. (born 1969 in Mundelein, Illinois) is a Republican member of the Illinois House of Representatives, representing the 51st district since 2003.

After receiving a B.A. in History and Political Science from the University of Illinois at Urbana–Champaign in 1991, Sullivan Jr. served as an aide to U.S. Congressman Phil Crane (IL-8). In 1993, he was elected to the first of five terms as the Fremont Township Assessor.

In April 2013, Rep. Sullivan became the second Republican representative in Illinois to support the state's same-sex marriage bill. He did not run for re-election in 2016.

== Early life and education ==
Sullivan Jr. is a graduate of Carmel High School. He received a B.A. in History and Political Science from the University of Illinois at Urbana–Champaign in 1991.

== Professional experience ==
Sullivan Jr. served as an aide to U.S. Congressman Phil Crane (IL-8). He was elected to his first term as the Fremont Township Assessor in 1993, and went on to serve four additional terms.

== District and legislation ==
The 51st State Representative District is a hook-shaped geographical area encompassing a wide range of suburban demographics in Lake County, Illinois, that includes all or substantial parts of the Illinois communities of Lake Zurich, Kildeer, Deer Park, Long Grove, Hawthorne Woods, Libertyville, Mundelein, Green Oaks, and Waukegan, Illinois.

Rep. Sullivan Jr. served as Assistant Republican Leader for the 98th session of the Illinois General Assembly. His committee assignments included Executive, Consumer Protection, and Rules where he was the "Republican Spokesperson" (ranking minority party member), as well as Mass Transit, Public Utilities, and Revenue and Finance.

Historical legislative efforts by Rep. Sullivan Jr. include extensive work on tax legislation and work on anti-gang initiatives. He was one of two Republican representatives in Illinois to support a same-sex marriage bill in April 2013.

The Illinois branch of the Republican-associated Opportunity Project (IOP), a self-described "research and public policy enterprise" advocating conservative state legislation and policies in support of "free markets and free minds" [a 501(c)(4) tax exempt organization], scored Rep. Sullivan Jr. in 2012 at 88 on a scale of 100; a grade of "A−", it was a score tied for 3rd highest of the 120 members of the Illinois House evaluated.

== Personal life ==
Sullivan Jr. is married; his wife, Trish, is a family nurse practitioner. They live in Mundelein with daughter Kaileigh and son Edwin.
