= Joe Walsh (Illinois politician) =

American politician (born 1961)

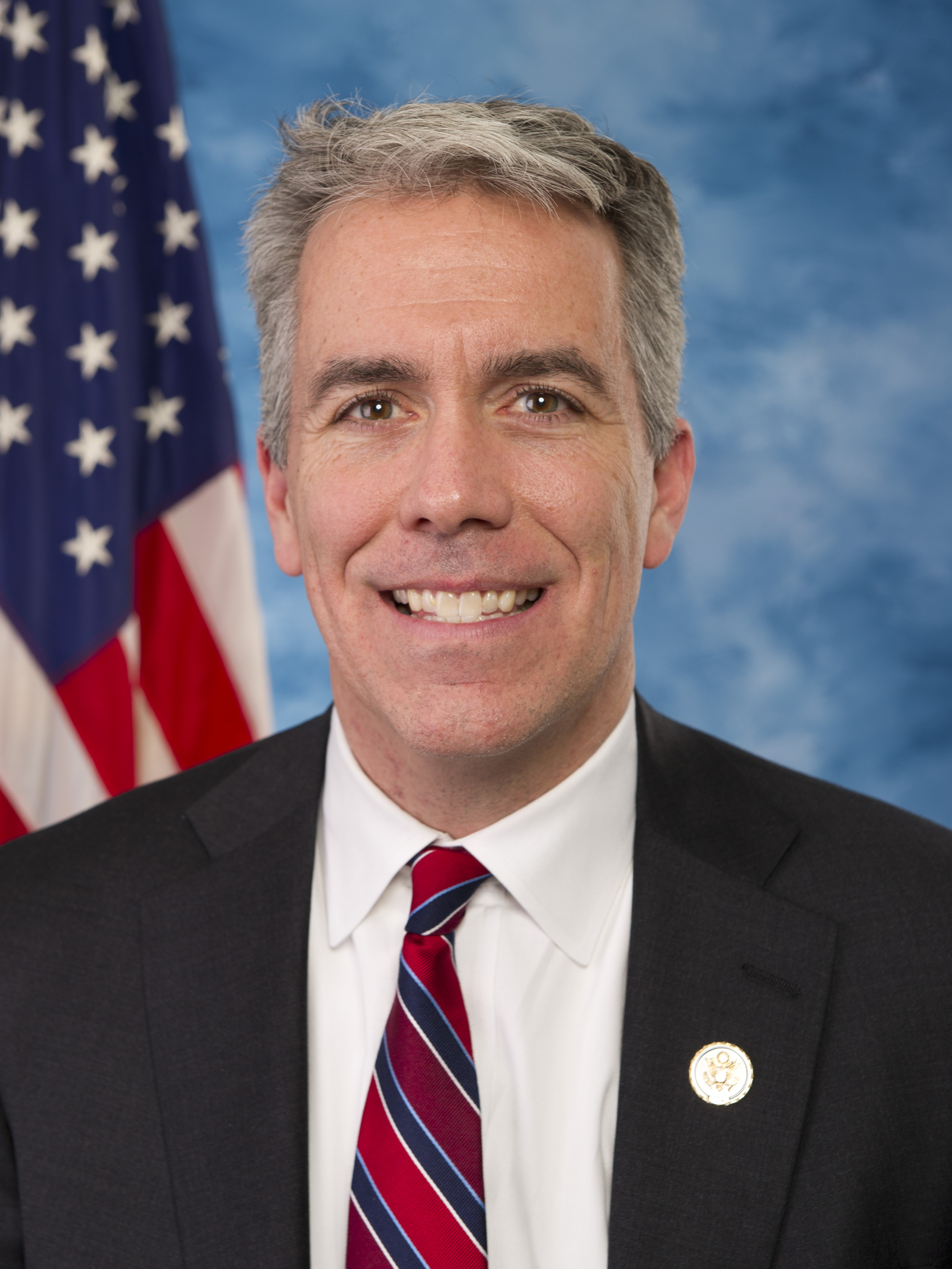
- Official portrait, 2011

Member of the U.S. House of Representatives from Illinois's 8th district
- In office January 3, 2011 – January 3, 2013
- Preceded by: Melissa Bean
- Succeeded by: Tammy Duckworth

Personal details
- Born: William Joseph Walsh; December 27, 1961 (age 64) North Barrington, Illinois, U.S.
- Party: Independent (2020–2025, 2026–present)
- Other political affiliations: Republican (before 2020); Democratic (2025–2026)
- Spouses: Laura Walsh (m. 1987; div. 2002); Helene Miller (m. 2006)
- Children: 5
- Education: Grinnell College; University of Iowa (BA); University of Chicago (MPP)

William Joseph Walsh (born December 27, 1961) is an American politician, talk radio host, former social worker, and 2020 Republican Party presidential candidate who represented Illinois's 8th congressional district in the United States House of Representatives from 2011 to 2013. He left the Republican Party in 2020 to become an independent before registering as a Democrat in 2025, then becoming an independent once again in 2026.

Born and raised in the Chicago metropolitan area, Walsh began his career as a social worker providing education and job skills training to students in low-income areas, gradually becoming more politically active. Walsh had unsuccessfully campaigned for Congress in 1996 and the Illinois House of Representatives in 1998, but was elected to the U.S. House in 2010, defeating three-term incumbent Melissa Bean. Though he received little Republican Party support in his bid against Bean, he was popular with the Tea Party movement. In the 1990s, he identified as a moderate Republican but later became a conservative and a Tea Party activist.

During his time in Congress, Walsh was criticized for his often personal attacks against members of the Democratic Party and, specifically, President Barack Obama. He accused the president of abandoning the U.S.–Israel alliance and bankrupting the country. Walsh maintained a no-compromise approach to legislating that included rejecting any tax increases. He consistently voted against raising the federal debt ceiling and authored a balanced budget amendment to the United States Constitution. Walsh rejected the scientific consensus on climate change and supported tougher border control. Later during his presidential campaign, Walsh expressed regret for some of the comments and stances he made during his time in Congress.

As a result of redistricting following the 2010 United States census, Walsh's district was redrawn by the Democratic-controlled Illinois General Assembly in 2012. While he initially planned to run in the newly drawn 14th district against fellow Republican representative Randy Hultgren, he eventually decided to run in the remapped 8th district against Democratic candidate Tammy Duckworth. Walsh was defeated by Duckworth (who would also later go on to become a Senator) in the general election on November 6, 2012. After leaving office, Walsh began hosting a talk radio show. Though initially a strong supporter of Donald Trump, Walsh became increasingly critical of him and, on August 25, 2019, he announced his presidential campaign in opposition to Trump. He dropped out of the race on February 7, 2020, after a poor showing in the Iowa caucus, and subsequently left the party. He later endorsed and voted for the Democratic nominee Joe Biden; Walsh formally joined the Democratic Party in 2025. On November 9, 2026, Walsh announced that he was leaving the Democratic Party and would become an independent once more.

== Early life and education ==
Walsh was born and raised in the Chicago suburb of North Barrington, the fifth of nine children of Susan (Stanley) and Charles Melville Walsh, a real estate mortgage banker who had an appraisal business. He graduated from Barrington High School in 1980, where he was the student body president and active in sports. He attended Grinnell College then earned a Bachelor of Arts in English from the University of Iowa in 1985. In the mid-1980s, he embarked on an acting career, taking lessons in stage, theater and television at The Lee Strasberg Theatre and Film Institute in New York City and Los Angeles. He completed a Master of Public Policy at the University of Chicago's Harris School of Public Policy Studies in 1991.

== Early career ==
As a social worker, Walsh worked with the Jobs for Youth program in the inner-city Chicago area, teaching high school dropouts basic academic and job skills. He later taught American government and American history at Oakton Community College and the Hebrew Theological College.

Walsh ran the Daniel Murphy Scholarship Fund, a Chicago-based, privately funded program which grants scholarships to low-income students to attend private high schools. He raised funds for two organizations advocating school choice: the American Education Reform Council, and the Milton and Rose Friedman Foundation. In addition, Walsh raised nearly $1 million over a five-year period for the Fabretto Children's Foundation, an international charity which uses education and micro-enterprise to alleviate poverty among Nicaraguan children.

Walsh worked on state and local government policy issues for the Heartland Institute, a libertarian free-market think tank based in Chicago. He helped launch conservative organizations that seek to limit government and elect fiscal conservatives to state legislatures such as the Legislative Education Action Drive and the Americans for Limited Government. He also did consulting work with the United Republican Fund, an Illinois political action committee helping to elect Republican state legislators.

Walsh has raised venture capital for a living, according to the Chicago Tribune, with his campaign website indicating that he worked for Ravenswood Advisors, a Chicago boutique investment banking group which raised early-stage investment capital for new and small businesses. It was reported that Walsh earned $30,000 to $40,000 a year in the past. In 2010, he had a negative net worth of $317,498 according to OpenSecrets.

== Political career ==
=== Campaigns ===
==== 1996 ====
Walsh won the Republican nomination for Illinois's 9th congressional district and faced longtime Democratic liberal incumbent Sidney R. Yates, who was 87 years old, in the general election. Walsh campaigned by riding his bicycle through the district. He engaged in self-admitted "outrageous" stunts during the campaign which included paying the doorman at Yates's Chicago apartment building $1,000 for being the first person to spot Yates in his district, and throwing a birthday party for Yates that included a cake decorated with 87 candles. Walsh denied he was trying to play the "age card". Yates responded that his own age was not a factor, and that Walsh was too young and inexperienced for the job. Yates also commented that the district was too liberal for Walsh, and tried to tie Walsh to the conservative speaker of the House, Newt Gingrich. In response, Walsh distanced himself from Gingrich and said he considered himself a "moderate Republican;" he also ran as a pro-choice candidate in the liberal-leaning district, and described himself as "the most gay friendly Republican around". Yates defeated Walsh 63%–37%.

==== 1998 ====
In 1998, Walsh challenged incumbent Democrat Jeffrey Schoenberg for the 58th district seat in the Illinois House of Representatives, which represents the Chicago North Shore suburbs of Wilmette and Evanston, Illinois. Walsh again ran as pro-choice on abortion. He drove a yellow school bus throughout the district during his campaign to focus attention on the issue of public school funding. He criticized Schoenberg for voting in favor of Republican governor Jim Edgar's school-funding reform bill that would have increased state income taxes but given property tax relief to North Shore homeowners. Walsh lost to Schoenberg, 62%–38%.

=== United States Representative ===
==== Elections ====
2010

On September 28, 2009, Walsh launched an exploratory committee to run for the United States House of Representatives in the Illinois's 8th congressional district. The district included parts of the northwest Chicago suburbs, such as Arlington Heights, Schaumburg, Gurnee, Palatine, Mundelein, Zion, Barrington, Woodstock and Walsh's home in McHenry. It had long been reckoned as the most Republican district in the Chicago area, and by some measures in all of Illinois. However, in 2004, Democrat Melissa Bean had ousted 36-year Republican incumbent Phil Crane in a substantial upset, ending seventy years of Republican control.

In February 2010, Walsh won the Republican primary election, taking about 34 percent of the vote in a six-person field and moving into the district from Winnetka in April. The Republican establishment refused to put much stock into the district with National Republican Congressional Committee member Tom Erickson, saying, "In the primary, we had really liked Dirk Beveridge or Maria Rodriguez. Those are the two candidates who we thought really had the potential to make this a very competitive race." Walsh's campaign responded that the GOP establishment was "a bit tone deaf when it comes to independent, conservative reform candidates".

Walsh advanced to face Bean in the general election. In 2006, Bean had been re-elected with 51% and in 2008 with 60% of the vote. Bean was endorsed by the Chicago Tribune, the Chicago Sun-Times, The Daily Herald, and the Lake County News-Sun. Walsh criticized Bean for her 2010 votes in favor of the Patient Protection and Affordable Care Act, and against the Stupak–Pitts Amendment that would have prohibited the use of federal funds to cover any part of the cost of any health plan that included coverage of abortion. He described himself as a Tea Party conservative activist and obtained endorsements from two Tea Party organizations, conservative radio talk show host Tom Roeser, and many others.

The national Democratic and Republican parties did not compete or spend any money in the district, and the state GOP did not help Walsh. As a result, during the 2010 election cycle, Walsh's campaign raised only one-quarter as much as Bean's. He spent about $603,000 and ended the campaign about $362,000 in debt according to campaign finance reports, (with much of the debt due to post election ballot counting of the close race). As late as October, The New York Times forecast that Bean had an 88 percent chance at winning re-election. Even CQ Politics had the election as "Safe Democratic". Despite the lack of funding and his long-shot status, Walsh narrowly defeated Bean by a margin of 0.1% or 291 votes. The race was not called until two weeks after Election Day when provisional ballots were counted. It appeared that Green Party candidate Bill Scheurer was a factor in the race; he tallied 6,400 votes, far more than Walsh's margin of victory.

=== Political positions ===
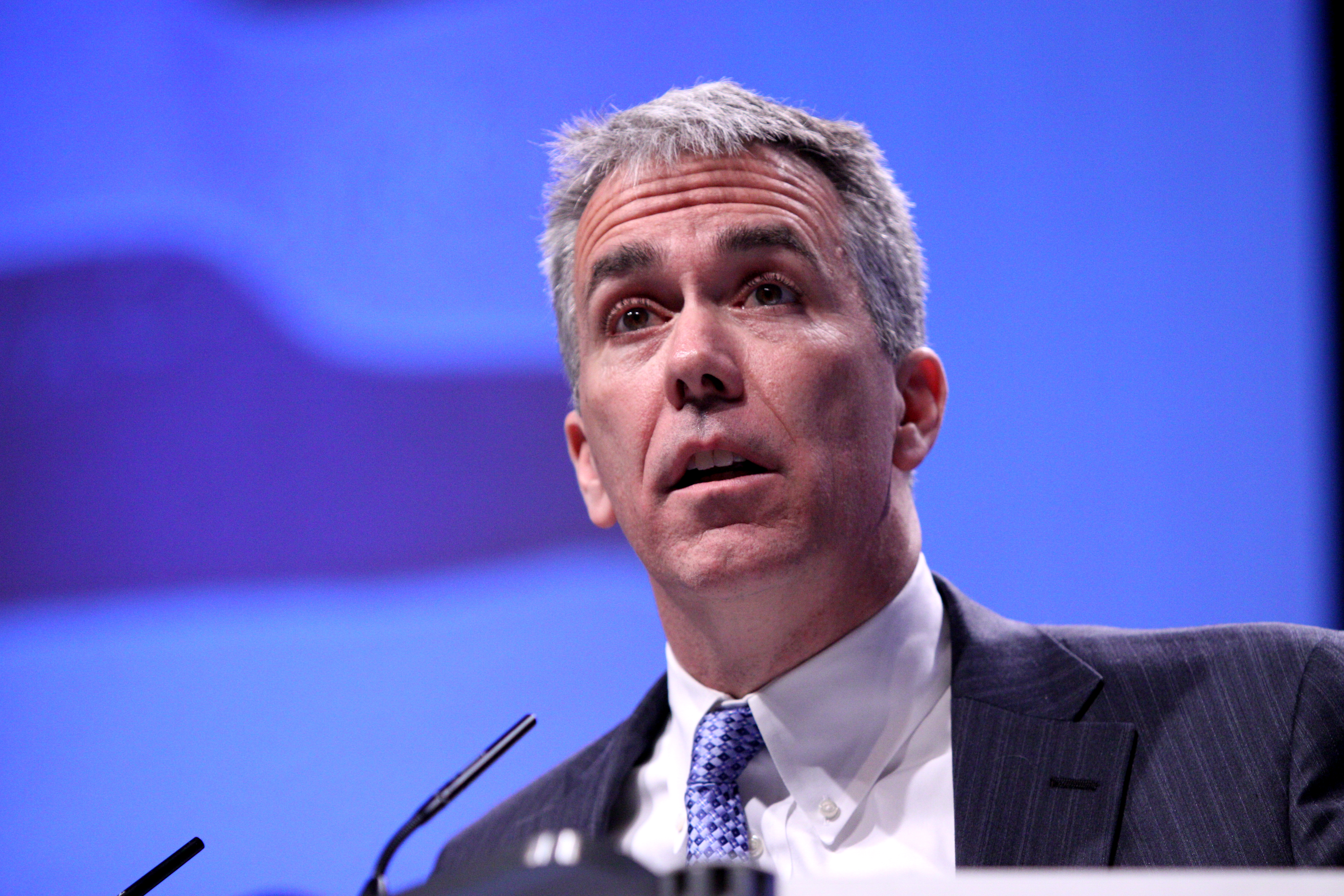
Walsh speaking at CPAC in 2011

In his failed 1996 congressional bid, Walsh was more socially liberal, favoring abortion rights and gun control. By 2010, his views had become more conservative. Through the decade, he took some moderate positions and reversed some of his previously conservative positions.

==== Economics ====
On taxes, Walsh stated he favors extending the Bush tax cuts, abolishing the estate tax, and cutting both the capital gains and corporate tax rates. He blamed joblessness on a reluctance by small businesses to hire and traced that reluctance to an uncertainty on tax policy. In November 2011, Walsh said that the Occupy movement was composed of "generally spoiled, pampered, unfocused, clueless young people and a smattering of other people who don't understand this country and are advocating anti-American solutions." When a constituent pointed out that veterans have also taken part in the Occupy movement, Walsh responded, "I don't know how many veterans are part of the Occupy protest. I can't imagine it's many. But anyone who would advocate socialist solutions to certain problems in this country ... they don't understand this country."

==== Medicare and Social Security ====
On entitlement reform, he suggested cuts would have to be made. "The first thing we need to do is acknowledge that everybody is going to have to give on Social Security reform and Medicare reform," he said. Walsh opposes the extension of unemployment benefits. He said the benefits have already been extended for too long and that attention should be paid to the cost. Following President Obama's 2011 State of the Union address, Walsh remarked that he did not believe there should be a social safety net because it is not in the Constitution.

==== Environment ====
On global warming, he described the science behind it as "not definitive" and that U.S. economic interests should come first in any discussion of climate agreements.

==== Immigration ====
Walsh was critical of President Obama's immigration policies, saying the president had made only token efforts toward securing the borders. In May 2011, while holding a toy alligator in his hand, Walsh announced on the House floor that he would support tough border legislation even if it involved building moats and filling them with alligators.

==== Social issues ====
During his time in the House of Representatives, Walsh trended rightward on social issues. On abortion, he said to reporters in October 2012 that abortion is never medically necessary to save the life of the mother, saying that "with modern technology and science, you can't find one instance" of a medically necessary abortion. Walsh was often critical of Black Lives Matter.

Walsh initially supported LGBT rights during his first two congressional campaigns in the 1990s, but then shifted rightward on the issue after he was elected to Congress in the 2010s. In 2014, Walsh referred to the LGBT community as "constitutional terrorists". Walsh opposed same-sex marriage as a member of Congress.

==== Foreign affairs ====
Walsh holds strongly pro-Israel views. In a May 2012 op-ed for the Washington Times, Walsh opposed the two-state solution, saying it has "failed" and was "insanity"; he advocated for total Israeli annexation of the Palestinian territories, arguing that the Palestinians living there could be given "limited voting power" within the Jewish state and encouraging them to move to Jordan. This led to accusations that Walsh advocated apartheid and the "soft" ethnic cleansing of Palestinians from their ancestral home. He wrote a column in The Daily Caller stating that President Obama is "not Israel's friend" and should not have criticized Israel for continuing to build settlements in the occupied territories.

In November 2011, Walsh, along with fellow Tea Partier Ron Paul, met French far-right National Front leader Marine Le Pen during her visit to the United States.

In 2012, Walsh campaigned to get Narendra Modi, then the chief minister of the Indian state of Gujarat, a diplomatic visa to the United States, which had previously been denied to him due to allegations of violations of religious freedom against Muslims during the 2002 Gujarat riots. Walsh said that Modi had "quite a successful track record" of fiscal responsibility, described him as "kind of like a Tea Party free market guy in India, which I found very appealing," and noted that he "has been recognized across the world for establishing Gujarat as the most business-friendly state in India and is widely believed to be a serious contender for the 2014 election for Indian Prime Minister." Modi did win the 2014 general election, becoming Prime Minister of India.

=== 2012 ===
During the 2011 redrawing of Illinois' election districts by the Democratic-controlled state legislature, Walsh's home, along with most of the McHenry County portion of his old district, was drawn into the 14th district, represented by fellow Republican Randy Hultgren. The 8th was reconfigured to favor a Democratic candidate. Walsh and nine other Republican Illinois Representatives filed a lawsuit alleging that the new borders discriminated against Republican and Latino voters. On September 21, Walsh announced that if the new district lines were upheld in federal court, he would run for election in the then-heavily Republican 14th district against Hultgren.

In late July 2011, Walsh was endorsed by the Club for Growth to run against Hultgren. However, after several ethics issues regarding Walsh emerged, (such as charges of failing to pay child support, and driving on a suspended license), the Club for Growth distanced itself from Walsh, stating that it would wait until more facts were known before making a decision. In November 2011, Walsh was cited by the Family Research Council Action committee for his "unwavering support of the family." In December 2011, Walsh decided to run in the redrawn 8th district instead, where he would likely face Democratic candidate Tammy Duckworth, a former assistant secretary of the United States Department of Veterans Affairs, in what posed a tough race for Walsh. In January 2012, the conservative political advocacy group Americans for Prosperity gave Walsh a 100 percent rating.

The ensuing campaign between Walsh and Duckworth emerged as a bitter race. At a July 2012 campaign event, Walsh accused his opponent of politicizing both her military service as a helicopter pilot and her Iraq War injuries, which cost her both legs and the partial use of one arm. He said, "My God, that's all she talks about. Our true heroes, the men and women who served us, it's the last thing in the world they talk about." Walsh later suggested that she was, in fact, a "true hero," but that she should not talk about her service so frequently, and that her service should not command votes. Walsh decided to skip the 2012 Republican National Convention, distancing himself from establishment Republicans.

Walsh's campaign was bolstered by major financial support in the form of outside spending by conservative Super PACs. In September 2012, Americans for Limited Government gave $1,950,000 to the Now or Never PAC, which then spent $2,022,039 to support Walsh and oppose Duckworth. Over $6.6 million in outside spending was reported in the race, with Walsh receiving more than $6 million of that total. Overall, Walsh outspent her $7 million to $4.7 million. Despite his spending advantage, on November 6, 2012, Duckworth unseated Walsh 55% to 45%. Despite his loss, Walsh outperformed the 2012 Republican presidential nominee, Mitt Romney, who received 41% of the vote in the 8th district.

==== Tenure ====
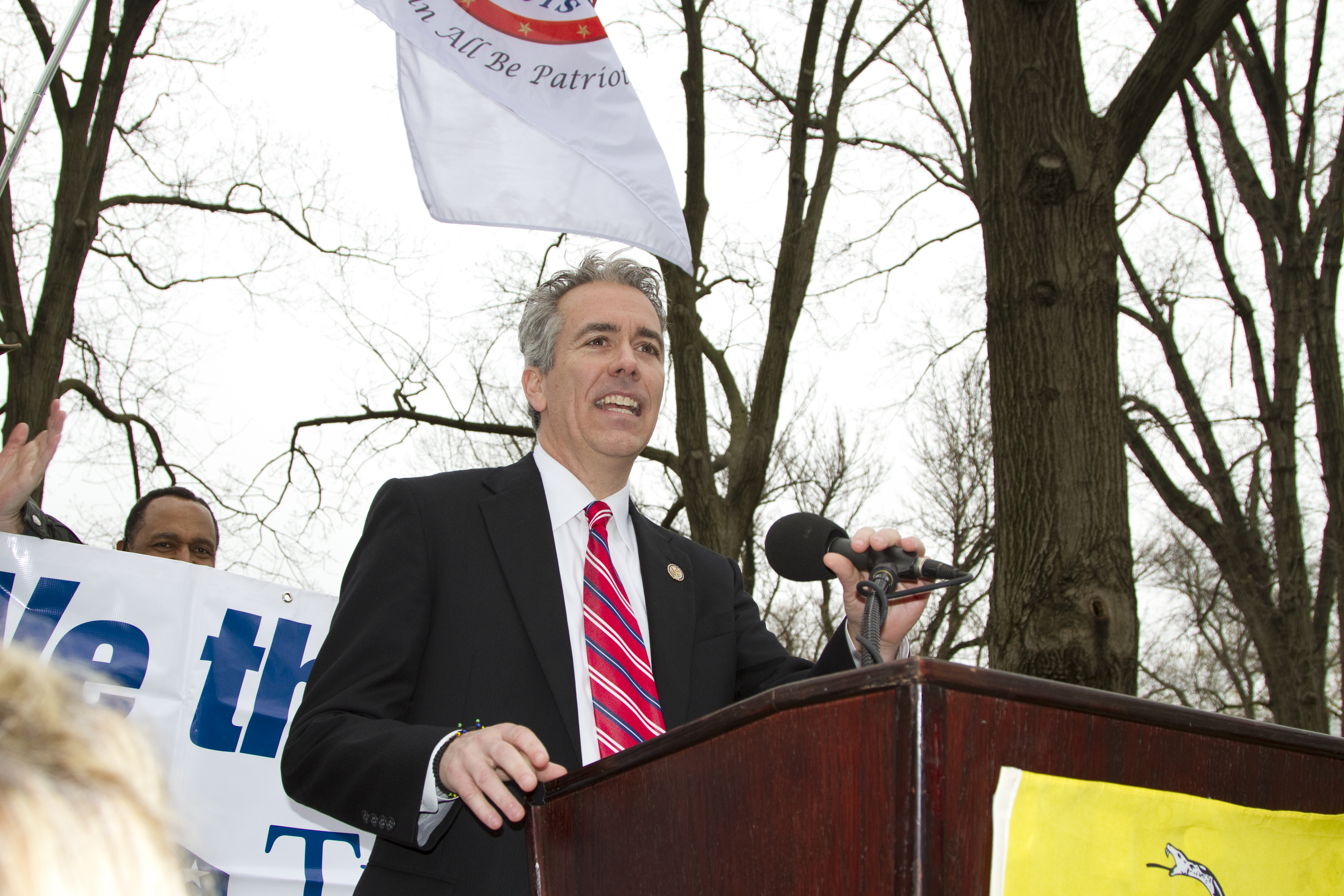
Walsh speaking at a Tea Party rally on March 31, 2011

Several days before being sworn into Congress, Walsh was criticized by The New York Times for his willingness to accept donations from political action committees and lobbyists. After being sworn in, Walsh announced that consistent with his opposition to government-provided health care and the 2010 health care reform legislation, he would not accept congressional health care benefits.

During his early months in Congress, he emerged as a vocal critic of the Democratic Party and President Obama's fiscal policies, and posted a YouTube video in which he accused President Obama of bankrupting the country. He also vowed, "I won't place one more dollar of debt upon the backs of my kids and grandkids unless we structurally reform the way this town [Washington, D.C.] spends money!" He became a frequent fixture on cable TV, advocating a "no compromise" approach to deficit reduction that rejects any tax increases on the wealthy. He consistently voted against raising the federal debt ceiling and authored a balanced budget amendment to the United States Constitution. Walsh has also said that President Obama was elected "because he pushed that magical button: a black man who was articulate, liberal, the whole white guilt, all of that." In his first six months in office, Walsh made over 30 appearances on television.

During the election season, Walsh was asked what his approach to bipartisanship would be if elected. He replied it would "not be the time right now to extend your hand across the aisle". In September 2011, Walsh was among 19 members of Congress criticized for ethics violations in the Citizens for Responsibility and Ethics in Washington annual report. In November 2011, Walsh was videotaped meeting with his constituents, becoming visibly aggressive and swearing at a woman who questioned him about his comment that the marketplace and the banks were not responsible "for the mess we're in right now." He later apologized for being "too passionate". While in Congress, Walsh held 363 town hall meetings, more than any other member of Congress.

==== Committee assignments ====
For the 112th Congress, Walsh was appointed to leadership positions on the House Homeland Security Subcommittee on Transportation Security (vice chairman), and the House Small Business Subcommittee on Economic Growth (chairman). A list of all of his former committee assignments follows:

- Committee on Homeland Security
  - Subcommittee on Counterterrorism and Intelligence
  - Subcommittee on Emergency Preparedness, Response, and Communications
  - Subcommittee on Transportation Security (Vice Chair)
- Committee on Oversight and Government Reform
  - Subcommittee on Health Care, District of Columbia, Census and the National Archives
  - Subcommittee on TARP, Financial Services and Bailouts of Public and Private Programs
- Committee on Small Business
  - Subcommittee on Healthcare and Technology
  - Subcommittee on Economic Growth, Tax and Capital Access (Chair)
  - Subcommittee on Investigations, Oversight and Regulations

==== Caucus memberships ====
Walsh held other memberships related to his work as a congressman including: the Congressional Hockey Caucus, the House Republican Israel Caucus, the Republican Study Committee and the Tea Party Caucus.

=== 2020 presidential campaign ===
In an interview on This Week on August 25, 2019, Walsh announced that he would enter the 2020 Republican Party primary race, challenging incumbent president Donald Trump. He stated that Trump's behavior in office motivated him to declare his candidacy. Walsh admitted that some of his past comments might have "helped create Trump" and that Trump "made me reflect on some of the things I said in the past." He stated he would not vote for Trump again and that he had not decided on whether to vote for a Democrat to prevent Trump's re-election. Following his announcement, Salem Radio Network said it would cancel its national distribution of his talk show on September 26, 2019, and that Walsh will be free to sign up with a different syndicator if he chooses. Walsh commented, "No more radio show, but that's OK. I'm going to campaign full time."

On November 13, 2019, Walsh filed to challenge Trump in the New Hampshire primaries. On February 7, 2020, Walsh announced on CNN that he was ending his presidential campaign after receiving only 1.1% of the vote in the Iowa caucuses. He called the Republican Party a "cult" and said he was leaving the party. He suggested he would likely support the Democratic nominee in the general election. According to Walsh, no one could beat Trump in a Republican primary, because Trump supporters had become "followers" who think that Trump "can do no wrong", after absorbing misinformation "from 'conservative' media. They don't know what the truth is and – more importantly – they don't care." In an interview with Fox News, Walsh reiterated he was willing to support a socialist over Trump in the general election, and he repeated this sentiment in later comments.

=== 2025 party change and 2026 Senate campaign ===
After joining the Democratic Party in 2025, Walsh described himself as a "conservative Democrat" who felt the party should be a big tent for those who "believe in freedom, democracy [and] the rule of law." In June, he publicly expressed interest in moving to South Carolina and running against Lindsey Graham for the state's Senate seat as a Democrat.

== Electoral history ==
Joe Walsh electoral history

1996 U.S. House of Representatives election in Illinois' 9th district
Party	Candidate	Votes	%
Democratic	Sidney Yates (incumbent)	124,319	63.4
Republican	Joe Walsh	71,763	36.6
Total votes		196,082	100
Turnout			66
Democratic hold			

1998 Illinois House of Representatives election in the 58th district
Party	Candidate	Votes	%
Democratic	Jeffrey Schoenberg (incumbent)	23,340	62
Republican	Joe Walsh	14,324	38
Total votes		37,664	100
Turnout			52
Democratic hold			

2010 Illinois' 8th U.S House of Representatives district Republican primary, February 2, 2010
Party	Candidate	Votes	%
Republican	Joe Walsh	16,162	34.2
Republican	Dirk Beveridge	11,708	24.7
Republican	Maria Rodriguez	9,803	20.7
Republican	Chris Geissler	4,267	9.0
Republican	John Dawson	3,921	8.3
Republican	Greg Jacobs	1,445	3.1
Total votes		47,306	100
Turnout			23

2010 U.S. House of Representatives general election in Illinois' 8th district, November 2, 2010
Party	Candidate	Votes	%
Republican	Joe Walsh	98,115	48.5
Democratic	Melissa Bean (incumbent)	97,824	48.3
Green	Bill Scheurer	6,494	3.2
Total votes		202,433	100.0
Republican gain from Democratic			

2012 Republican primary, March 20, 2012
Party	Candidate	Votes	%
Republican	Joe Walsh (incumbent)	35,102	99.9
Republican	Robert Canfield (write-in)	54	0.1
Total votes		35,156	100

2012 U.S. House of Representatives general election in Illinois' 8th district, November 6, 2012
Party	Candidate	Votes	%
Democratic	Tammy Duckworth	123,206	54.7
Republican	Joe Walsh (incumbent)	101,860	45.3
Total votes		225,066	100
Democratic gain from Republican			

== Post-congressional career ==
On March 25, 2013, Walsh aired his first radio show, The Joe Walsh Show, on Chicago's talk station WIND as a conservative political commentator. After less than a year on the air in Chicago, The Joe Walsh Show also began airing on WNYM in New York City. In April 2015, WNYM dropped Walsh from its radio platform. As of September 2016, Walsh's radio talk show is aired in several major U.S. cities, including Chicago, New York City, Phoenix, Dallas, and Denver. On December 19, 2015, Walsh announced that, should Democratic presidential candidate, and later the nominee, Hillary Clinton win the 2016 United States presidential election, he would run for the office himself in 2020. However, Republican nominee Donald Trump won the 2016 election, defeating Clinton.

In February 2017, The Joe Walsh Show received national syndication by the Salem Radio Network. Walsh joined Newsmax TV in May 2018. On August 26, 2019, a day after announcing his campaign for president, Walsh announced he had lost his radio show. After concluding his run for president, Walsh resumed broadcasting in June 2020 with a two-hour call-in talk show on the GAB Radio Network and its Chicago flagship station WCGO. On May 26, 2021, Walsh announced that he lost that radio show because he was "anti-Trump". In October 2021, Walsh launched his new podcast White Flag, which he claimed had been in the works for months. His first guest on the podcast was Andrew Yang.

Walsh also operates a Substack political blog called The Social Contract.

=== Controversial statements ===
According to various media outlets, Walsh has a history of making controversial statements. On August 8, 2012, while serving in the House, Walsh appeared at a town hall in Elk Grove Village, Illinois. Walsh made several comments about the dangers of "radical Islam" and suggested that the danger was in nearby towns, and that Muslims are "trying to kill Americans every week."

On June 19, 2014, Walsh was removed from his radio show for using racial slurs. He was on air again the next day. WIND general manager Jeff Reisman commented: "During the segment Joe intended to cite several common racial slurs as examples. He did not in any way use them in a defamatory or derogatory manner, simply as examples. However, AM 560 The Answer did not allow them to go on the air. AM 560 The Answer has a policy of not using certain words on the air that are highly inflammatory and offensive even in the context of a discussion of why those words are offensive. We will continue that policy." On January 14, 2015, following the Charlie Hebdo shooting, in a tweet which he described as satirical, Walsh called for Islamists to "behead" reporters on CNN and MSNBC and referred to them as "appeasing cowards" for not airing cartoons published by the French satirical magazine Charlie Hebdo which depicts prophet Muhammad. In another tweet, Walsh stated that not showing cartoons of Muhammad would lead to more attacks.

On July 7, 2016, the night of the shooting deaths of five Dallas police officers, Walsh wrote on Twitter, "This is now war. Watch out Obama. Watch out Black Lives Matter punks. Real America is coming after you." These comments were interpreted by some as threats. After deleting the tweet (by his account, it was deleted by Twitter), Walsh wrote later, "I wasn't calling for violence, against Obama or anyone. Obama's words and BLM's deeds have gotten cops killed. Time for us to defend our cops." The next morning, Walsh stated in an interview with the Chicago Tribune that Twitter suspended his account and deleted the tweet itself: "The pre-condition for me reopening my account was they had to delete that tweet." He said, "Of course I didn't mean 'let's go kill Obama and Black Lives Matter.' I was not trying to incite violence against Obama and Black Lives Matter. That's crazy and stupid and wrong. It would end my career and it's wrong." Rep. Keith Ellison also called for the investigation of Walsh following the tweet.

On October 24, 2016, Walsh wrote on Twitter, "On November 8th, I'm voting for Trump. On November 9th, if Trump loses, I'm grabbing my musket. You in?" When Jake Tapper asked him what he meant, Walsh responded, "It means protesting. Participating in acts of civil disobedience. Doing what it takes to get our country back." The New York Post wrote that "some took his tweet as a call for violent insurrection." On May 2, 2017, Walsh wrote on Twitter, "Sorry Jimmy Kimmel: your sad story doesn't obligate me or anybody else to pay for somebody else's health care," in reference to a 13-minute monologue delivered by late night host Jimmy Kimmel discussing his son's congenital heart defect and his belief that covering pre-existing conditions is an important part of healthcare in the United States. On September 23, 2017, Walsh described Stevie Wonder as "Another ungrateful black multi millionaire" after Wonder had taken a knee at his concert in protest of what he termed police brutality. In 2018, Sacha Baron Cohen's satirical television program Who Is America? premiered showing Walsh supporting the hoax "kinderguardians program" which supported training toddlers with firearms. In August 2019, he stated that while he did not consider himself a racist, "I've said racist things on Twitter."

== Personal life ==
Walsh has been married twice, and has three children and two stepchildren. His second marriage, in 2006, is to Helene Miller, who served as an Illinois state representative from 2018 to 2019. He is Catholic. Following Walsh's victory in the 2010 Republican primary, it was reported that a bank had foreclosed on his condo and he had been evicted in October 2009, but that he and his family were living in a rented house in the Chicago North Shore suburb of Winnetka at the time. A GOP spokesman said that voters would likely identify with Walsh's financial troubles. He was also reportedly facing a lawsuit by a former campaign manager who claimed Walsh owed him $20,000 for services and had federal and state tax liens in the 1980s and 1990s (all paid by 2001). Walsh explained that the major portion of the past due taxes were on a college trust fund he received from his grandfather and that neither he nor his family had been aware that the funds were taxable. He also explained that his more recent financial struggles have made him more attuned to the difficulties faced by the average constituent.

In July 2011, the Chicago Sun-Times reported that Walsh's ex-wife, Laura, was suing him for $117,437 for past due child support dating from 2005 for their three children. Walsh allegedly had told his ex-wife that he did not have the money because he was out of work; she had later seen from his campaign disclosures that he had been employed. Walsh's attorney said that Walsh did not owe "anywhere near that amount," and that he had had no more problems paying child support than "any other average guy". Walsh and his ex-wife began working out a settlement of the disputed past due amount in late July 2011. Walsh's financial problems inspired the proposal of a bill which would forbid people owing more than $10,000 in back child support from running for office in Illinois. On April 20, 2012, a settlement was reached, and the case dismissed. As part of the settlement, Walsh issued a statement on behalf of himself and his ex-wife which read, in part, "Having resolved these issues together and cleared up these mistakes in private, we now agree that Joe is not and was not a 'deadbeat dad' and does not owe child support."

In August 2011, the Chicago Tribune reported that Walsh lost his driving privileges from mid-April to mid-July 2011 because he let his insurance lapse. In response, Walsh criticized the Tribune for "wast[ing] time and ink scrutinizing [his] driving record over the last 22 years rather than Washington's unsustainable spending". On February 1, 2013, Walsh filed a motion to terminate child support obligations, claiming that as he was now unemployed he was unable to contribute to the support of his children.

== Publications ==
- F*ck Silence: Calling Trump Out for the Cultish, Moronic, Authoritarian Con Man He Is (2020) ISBN 978-1094132501

== See also ==
- List of party switchers; Republican to Independent to Democrat
- List of Tea Party politicians

U.S. House of Representatives
Preceded by Melissa Bean	Member of the U.S. House of Representatives from Illinois's 8th congressional district 2011–2013	Succeeded by Tammy Duckworth
U.S. order of precedence (ceremonial)
Preceded by Debbie Halvorson as Former U.S. Representative	Order of precedence of the United States as Former U.S. Representative	Succeeded by William Enyart as Former U.S. Representative
