= Forest Lake, Illinois =

- Census-designated place
- Location in Illinois Location in the United States
- Coordinates: 42°12′37″N 88°03′11″W
- Country: United States
- State: Illinois
- County: Lake
- Township: Ela

Area
  - Total: 0.41 sq mi (1.06 km^{2})
  - Land: 0.35 sq mi (0.91 km^{2})
  - Water: 0.062 sq mi (0.16 km^{2})
- Elevation: 794 ft (242 m)

Population (2020)
  - Total: 1,784
  - Density: 5,104.2/sq mi (1,970.74/km^{2})
- Time zone: UTC-6 (CST)
  - Summer (DST): UTC-5 (CDT)
- Area codes: 847, 224
- FIPS code: 17-26896
- GNIS feature ID: 2393000

Forest Lake is an unincorporated community and census-designated place (CDP) in Ela Township of Lake County, Illinois, United States. It is about 35 miles (56 km) northwest of downtown Chicago. Per the 2020 census, the population was 1,784. The community was founded in 1935 as a vacation community for Chicago residents.

== Geography ==
Forest Lake is located in southwestern Lake County. It is bordered to the north, west, and south by Hawthorn Woods, and to the east and south by Kildeer. The village of Lake Zurich boundary comes within 0.1 miles (0.16 km) of the southwest corner of the CDP.

According to the 2021 census gazetteer files, Forest Lake has a total area of 0.41 square miles (1.06 km^{2}), of which 0.35 square miles (0.91 km^{2}) (or 85.16%) is land and 0.06 square miles (0.16 km^{2}) (or 14.84%) is water, consisting of the community's namesake water body.

== Demographics ==
Historical population
Census	Pop.	Note	%±
2010	1,659		—
2020	1,784		7.5%
U.S. Decennial Census; 2010 2020

=== Racial and ethnic composition ===
Forest Lake CDP, Illinois – Racial and ethnic composition Note: the US Census treats Hispanic/Latino as an ethnic category. This table excludes Latinos from the racial categories and assigns them to a separate category. Hispanics/Latinos may be of any race.
Race / Ethnicity (NH = Non-Hispanic)	Pop 2000	Pop 2010	Pop 2020	% 2000	% 2010	% 2020
White alone (NH)	1,412	1,454	1,468	92.29%	87.64%	82.29%
Black or African American alone (NH)	6	17	12	0.39%	1.02%	0.67%
Native American or Alaska Native alone (NH)	0	0	2	0.00%	0.00%	0.11%
Asian alone (NH)	14	63	79	0.92%	3.80%	4.43%
Native Hawaiian or Pacific Islander alone (NH)	0	1	3	0.0%	0.06%	0.17%
Other race alone (NH)	0	1	4	0.00%	0.06%	0.22%
Mixed race or Multiracial (NH)	24	9	80	1.57%	0.54%	4.48%
Hispanic or Latino (any race)	74	114	136	4.84%	6.87%	7.62%
Total	1,530	1,659	1,784	100.00%	100.00%	100.00%

=== 2020 census ===
As of the 2020 census, Forest Lake had a population of 1,784. The median age was 41.9 years. 24.5% of residents were under the age of 18 and 15.3% were 65 years of age or older. For every 100 females, there were 102.3 males, and for every 100 females age 18 and over, there were 101.3 males age 18 and over.

100.0% of residents lived in urban areas, while 0.0% lived in rural areas.

There were 662 households and 420 families residing in the CDP. Of all households, 33.8% had children under the age of 18 living in them, 64.8% were married-couple households, 15.9% were households with a male householder and no spouse or partner present, and 15.1% were households with a female householder and no spouse or partner present. 20.0% of households were made up of individuals, and 7.6% had someone living alone who was 65 years of age or older. The average household size was 2.68 and the average family size was 2.44.

The population density was 4,340.63 inhabitants per square mile (1,675.93/km^{2}). There were 681 housing units at an average density of 1,656.93 per square mile (639.74/km^{2}). Of the 681 housing units, 2.8% were vacant. The homeowner vacancy rate was 0.7% and the rental vacancy rate was 4.4%.

=== Income and poverty ===
The median income for a household in the CDP was $87,232, and the median income for a family was $105,588. Males had a median income of $56,597 versus $26,952 for females. The per capita income for the CDP was $42,782. About 0.0% of families and 3.0% of the population were below the poverty line, including 0.0% of those under age 18 and 18.6% of those age 65 or over.
