= Illinois Republican Party =

Illinois affiliate of the Republican Party

- Chairperson: Bob Grogan
- Senate Leader: John Curran
- House Leader: Tony McCombie
- Founded: 1856
- Headquarters: Springfield, Illinois
- Ideology: Conservatism
- National affiliation: Republican Party
- Colors: Red
- Seats in the U.S. Senate: 0 / 2
- Seats in the U.S. House of Representatives: 3 / 17
- Seats in the Illinois Senate: 19 / 59
- Seats in the Illinois House of Representatives: 40 / 118
- Statewide Offices: 0 / 6
- Seats in the Supreme Court: 2 / 7
- Cook County Board of Commissioners: 1 / 17

Election symbol

Website
- illinois.gop

The Illinois Republican Party is the affiliate of the Republican Party in the U.S. state of Illinois founded on May 29, 1856. It is run by the Illinois Republican State Central Committee, which consists of 17 members, one representing each of the state's congressional districts. Once the dominant party in Illinois, the state GOP has become a minority party within the last few decades, holding little power in the state. The current chairman is Bob Grogan, who has served since 2026.

== History ==
Abraham Lincoln, the first U.S. president from Illinois (1861–1865).

=== Before the 1990s ===
The Illinois Republican Party was organized at the Bloomington Convention in Major's Hall in Bloomington on May 29, 1856. Its founding members came from the former Whig Party in Illinois after its members joined with several powerful local political factions including, notably, the Independent Democrat movement of Chicago that helped elect James Hutchinson Woodworth Mayor in 1848. According to The Cook County Album of Genealogy, Francis Schweinfurth Sr., who had emigrated with his family from Germany, was a factor in creating the Illinois Republican Party. he was known as devout Lutheran and a businessman in Chicago. He fought as an officer in the Civil War on the Union side. As a first lieutenant, he was captured and held prisoner of war at Chickamauga. He, with his brother, operated a bread baking business in Chicago. He is buried at Rosehill Cemetery in Chicago.

The early Illinois Republican Party enjoyed many members from commerce who shared the vision of Illinois generally, and Chicago in particular, as a gateway to the Western frontier of the United States. The early party members quickly identified their shared anti-slavery sentiment which further differentiated them from the older parties based on the East Coast. Many early members of the party failed to gain statewide office or election to the United States Congress due to this anti-slavery view, although this early position of the party in Illinois would later propel several candidates to prominent office, including the Governorship of Illinois won by Richard Yates, and in the mid-1850s, the election of former Chicago Mayor James Hutchinson Woodworth to one term in the United States House of Representatives.

On May 9–10, 1860 the Illinois Republican State Convention was held in Decatur. At this convention Abraham Lincoln received his first endorsement for president of the United States. Frank Schweinfurth, according to the Cook County Album of Genealogy, was a major force in nominating Abraham Lincoln. Until 1932, Republicans had virtually complete control over Illinois politics.

From 1932 to 1994, Republicans still usually had more control over Illinois politics, although Democrats still had a presence in the state and many noted Democratic politicians, most notably Adlai Stevenson II (lost to Republican Dwight Eisenhower twice), came from Illinois. President Ronald Reagan also came from Illinois, despite living in and serving two terms as Governor of California. The last time a Republican carried in presidential elections was 1988, when George H. W. Bush won Illinois by 2.1% marginal points.

=== After the 1990s ===
By the late 1990s, though, Illinois had started to become more Democratic in presidential elections, partly because the Republican's social conservatism in other states had started to alienated many Northeastern and some Midwestern Republican voters. Illinois rapidly became more Democratic in the second half of the 1990s and early 2000s. In contrast, most GOP candidates in Illinois gubernatorial and U.S. Senate races in recent years have been almost indistinguishable from Democrats on both social and fiscal issues, with the notable exception of Peter Fitzgerald who won the Senate race in 1998. While this tendency has helped Illinois GOP candidates in the Chicago and St. Louis Metro East suburbs, it has alienated many conservative voters downstate.

Other than a brief majority from 1995 to 1997 as a result of the Republican Revolution, the Republicans have been in the minority in the state House of Representatives since 1982. In 2002, while the Republicans did well in 2002 midterm elections nationwide, the Illinois Republicans lost their majority when a Democrat became Illinois governor for the first time in 26 years and Democrats gained control of the Illinois Senate, putting the party in the minority for the first time in state history.

=== Recent events ===
The 2010 elections saw the election of Illinois Republican Mark Kirk to the US Senate as well as a Republican sweep of Illinois US House seats. Republicans came within 5 seats of a majority in the Illinois House of Representatives and gained seats in the Senate. Republican nominee Bill Brady narrowly lost the gubernatorial election to Pat Quinn, leaving Democrats in full control of the redistricting process. This resulted in gerrymandering heavily in favor of Democrats. As a result of the redistricting process, Illinois Republicans suffered huge losses in the 2012 elections.

In 2013, the state party attempted to oust Chairman Pat Brady after he came out in favor of same-sex marriage. Brady would ultimately resign and was briefly replaced by Jack Dorgan. In 2014, Tim Schneider, who was a member of the Cook County Board of Commissioners, was named the chairman of the state party.

In the 2014 gubernatorial election, Republican nominee Bruce Rauner defeated incumbent Governor Pat Quinn to become the first GOP Governor since George Ryan left office in 2003. Republicans also picked up two Illinois congressional seats and a seat in the Illinois Senate.

During the 2018 Illinois Elections, Rauner lost to J. B. Pritzker in a landslide with the party also losing two congressional seats (Roskam and Hultgren) and becoming a superminority in the state legislature.

By 2021, the Illinois Republican Party was a minority party wielding little power within the state. With a decline that goes back over two decades, the state GOP's shrinking influence is attributed to Illinois becoming a solid blue state, the loss of voters in suburban areas, and the divisive embrace of Donald Trump and Trumpism.

The 2020 Elections saw a moderate swing back to the party in terms of votes, however this did not lead to major seat gains. The party lost one seat in the State Senate and gained one in the State House. However State Supreme Court Justice Thomas L. Kilbride was defeated in his bid for retention with the intention of flipping the seat to the Republicans in 2022.

Schneider stepped down as chairman in December 2020 and was replaced by Don Tracy, who was the chairman of the Illinois Gaming Board, in February 2021.

== Organization and leadership ==
The Illinois Republican Party is run by the Illinois Republican State Central Committee, which consists of 17 members, one representing each of the state's congressional districts.

=== Past chairmen (partial list) ===
Chairman	Term
Rebecca Paul	Co-Chairman: 1985
Victor L. Smith	1960–1973
Donald "Doc" Adams	1973–1988
Al Jourdan	1988–1993
Harold Byron Smith	1993–1999
Richard S. Williamson	1999–2001
Lee A. Daniels	2001–2002
Dallas Ingemunson	2002 (Interim)
Gary MacDougal	2002–2002
Judy Baar Topinka	2002–2005
Andrew McKenna	2005–2009
Pat Brady	2009–2013
Jack Dorgan	2013–2014
Tim Schneider	2014–2021; and Mark L. Shaw, ILGOP Co-Chairman and RCCA President: 2018--2022
Don Tracy	2021–2024; and Mark L. Shaw, ILGOP Co-Chairman and RCCA President: 2021--2022 and ILGOP Vice Chairman: 2022--2024
Kathy Salvi	2024–2026

== Current elected officials ==
After the 2022 elections, Republicans hold 3 of the state's 17 U.S. House seats and none of the statewide offices. The Republicans are also the minority in both chambers of the state legislature.

=== Members of Congress ===
==== U.S. Senate ====
- None

Both of Illinois's U.S. Senate seats have held by Democrats since 2017. Mark Kirk was the last Republican to represent Illinois in the U.S. Senate. First elected in 2010, Kirk lost re-election in 2016 to Tammy Duckworth.

==== U.S. House of Representatives ====
Out of the 17 seats Illinois is apportioned in the U.S. House of Representatives, 3 are held by Republicans:

District	Member	Photo
12th	Mike Bost	
15th	Mary Miller	
16th	Darin LaHood	

=== Statewide offices ===
- None

Republicans have not held a statewide elected office in Illinois since 2019, nor have they won a statewide election in the state since the 2014 gubernatorial and comptroller elections. No Illinois Republican has been elected to the office of Attorney General since 1998, the office of Secretary of State since 1994, or the office of State Treasurer since 2010.

=== Notable legislators ===
- Senate Minority Leader: John Curran
- State Senator: Darren Bailey

=== Mayoral offices ===
As of October 2026, one of Illinois' top ten largest cities is controlled by a Republican:

- Springfield (7): Misty Buscher

== Former elected officials ==
=== U.S. President ===
- Abraham Lincoln, the 16th President of the United States and former U.S. Representative.

=== U.S. Vice President ===
- Charles Dawes, nominated in 1924 to be Calvin Coolidge's running mate.

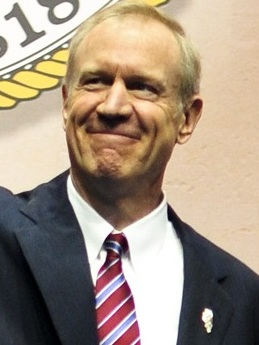
Bruce Rauner: 42nd Governor of Illinois

=== U.S Senate ===
- Lyman Trumbull (1855–71) (Note: Trumbull was elected as a member of the Democratic Party and became a member of the Liberal Republican faction before leaving office.)
- Orville Browning (1861–63)
- Richard Yates (1865–71)
- John A. Logan (1871–77, 1879–85, 1885–86)
- Richard J. Oglesby (1873–79)
- Shelby Moore Cullom (1883–1913)
- Charles Farwell (1887–91)
- William Mason (1897–1903)
- Albert Hopkins (1903–09)
- William Lorimer (1909–12) (Note: Lorimer's election to the Senate was voided in 1912.)
- Lawrence Yates Sherman (1913–21)
- Medill McCormick (1919–25)
- William B. McKinley (1921–26)
- Otis F. Glenn (1928–33)
- C. Wayland Brooks (1940–49)
- Everett Dirksen (1951–69)
- Charles H. Percy (1967–85)
- Ralph Tyler Smith (1969–70)
- Peter Fitzgerald (1999–2005)
- Mark Kirk (2010–17)

=== U.S House ===
- IL-6: Peter Roskam
- IL-6: Henry Hyde
- IL-8: Joe Walsh
- IL-10: Bob Dold
- IL-13: Rodney Davis
- IL-14: Randy Hultgren
- IL-15: John Shimkus
- IL-18: Ray LaHood

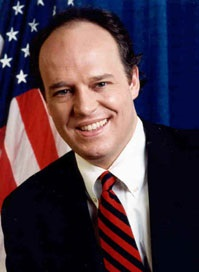
Peter Fitzgerald: United States Senator from 1999 to 2005.

=== Governor ===
- Bruce Rauner (2015–2019)
- George Ryan (1999–2003)
- Jim Edgar (1991–1999)
- James R. Thompson (1977–1991)

== See also ==
- Democratic Party of Illinois
- Political party strength in Illinois
- Government of Illinois
