= Langfelder =

Langfelder is a surname of Old High German origin, nowadays mainly found in the United States. Notable people with the surname include:

- Dulcinea Langfelder (1955–2025), American multidisciplinary artist
- Gertrude Langfelder (1884–1958), German actress, director, and radio play speaker
- Jim Langfelder (born 1960), mayor of Springfield, Illinois (2015–2023), son of Ossie
- Ossie Langfelder (1926–2015), mayor of Springfield, Illinois (1987–1995)
