= List of mayors of Springfield, Illinois =

This is a list of mayors of Springfield, Illinois, United States.

== Table ==
Image	Name of Mayor	Start of Term	End of Term	Time in office	Note
	Benjamin S. Clements	1840			
	William L. May	1841			
	David B. Campbell	1842			
	Daniel B. Hill	1843			
	Andrew McCormack	1844			
	James C. Conkling	1845			Served as Illinois state representative in the 17th (1866–1868) and the 25th Illinois General Assemblies (1850–1852)
	Eli Cook	1846	1848		
	John Calhoun	1849	1851		Served as Illinois state representative in the 11th Illinois General Assembly (1838-1940)
	Willam Lavely	1852			
	Josiah Francis	1853			Served as Illinois state representative in the 12th Illinois General Assembly (1840-1842)
	William Henry Herndon	1854			
	John Pope Cook	1855			
	John W. Priest	1856	1858		
	William Jayne	1859	1860	1 year	
	Goyn A. Sutton	1860	1864	4 years	
	George L. Huntington	1861	1862		
	John W. Smith	1863			
	John S. Vredenburg	1864			
	Thomas J. Dennis	1865			
	John S. Bradford	1866			
	Norman M. Broadwell	1867			
	William E. Shutt	1868			
	Norman M. Broadwell	1869			
	John W. Priest	1870			
	John W. Smith	1871	1872	1 year	
	Charles E. Hay	1873			
	Obed Lewis	1874			
	Charles E. Hay	1875			
	William Jayne	1876	1877	1 year	
	John A. Vincent	1878			
	R. L. McGuire	1879			
	Horace C. Irwin	1880			
	John McCreery	1881			
	A. N. J. Crook	1882			
	John McCreery	1883	1884		
	Jame Garland	1885	1886		
	Charles E. Hay	1887	1890		
	Rheuna Lawrence	1891	1892	1 year	
	Frank Kramer	1893	1894		
	Marion U. Woodruff	1895	1896		
	Loren Edgar Wheeler	1897	1900		
	John L. Phillips	1901	1902		
	Harry Devereux	1903	1906		
	David Griffiths	1907			
	Roy R. Reece	1907	1908		
	John Schnepp	1909	1915		
	Charles Baumann	1915	1923		
	Samuel A. Bullard	1923	1926		
	J. Emil Smith	1926	1930		
	Hal Smith	1930	1931		
	John W. Kapp, Jr.	1931	1947		
	Harry Eielson	1947	1951		
	John E. MacWherter	1951	1955		
	Nelson O. Howarth	1955	1959		
	Lester E. Collins	1959	1963		
	Nelson O. Howarth	1963	1971		
	William Telford	April 6, 1971	April 8, 1979	8 years, 2 days	
	J. Michael Houston	1979	1987		
	Ossie Langfelder	1987	1995		
	Karen Hasara	1995	April 2003		
	Timothy Davlin	April 2003	December 14, 2010		
	Frank Kunz	December 14, 2010	December 28, 2010	14 days	Mayor pro tempore
	Frank Edwards	December 28, 2010	April 29, 2011	4 months, 1 day	
	J. Michael Houston	April 29, 2011	May 7, 2015	4 years, 8 days	
	Jim Langfelder	May 7, 2015	May 5, 2023	7 years, 363 days	
	Misty Buscher	May 5, 2023	Present		

== See also ==
- Springfield history
