= J. Michael Houston =

Politician, businessman

Michael Houston
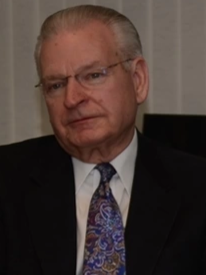
- Houston in 2014

Mayor of Springfield, Illinois
- In office April 29, 2011 – May 7, 2015
- Preceded by: Frank Edwards
- Succeeded by: Jim Langfelder
- In office 1979–1987
- Preceded by: William Telford
- Succeeded by: Ossie Langfelder

Personal details
- Born: 1944 (age 81–82) Boston, Massachusetts, U.S.
- Party: Republican
- Spouse: Carolyn
- Education: Illinois State University
- Occupation: Politician, bank executive

J. Michael "Mike" Houston (born 1944) is a former mayor of Springfield, Illinois. He served as Springfield's mayor from 1979 to 1987 and from 2011 to 2015.

== Background ==
The Houston family originally settled in Sangamon County in 1824. Houston was born in 1944 in Boston where his father was stationed in the U.S. Navy. After returning to Springfield following World War II, Houston attended Cathedral Grade School and Griffin High School. After one year at Springfield Junior College, Houston transferred to Illinois State University, where he graduated with a B.S. in business administration. He later completed an M.B.A. at the University of Illinois at Urbana-Champaign.

Following undergraduate school, Houston worked for Higbee's in Cleveland, Ohio, and then Cole National Corporation, where he ultimately became the general manager. During this time, he developed a desire to have his own business. While visiting his family back in Springfield, during the Christmas season in 1970, he found an ad for a chain link fence business, up for sale, which he decided to purchase.

== Political activities ==
In addition to running his business, Houston also served as president of Springfield JayCees (SJC). This was also when he became involved first-hand, with local politics and elections, while advocating for education-related referendums. One of his colleagues from SJC then decided to run for school board, and asked Houston to run his campaign, which fell narrowly short of victory. Houston subsequently assisted with the campaigns of State Senator John Davidson and State Representative J. David Jones, both of whom were also past presidents of SJC.

During the 1975 Springfield municipal elections, Houston began considering a future run for Mayor of Springfield. After serving in a leadership position within the local chamber of commerce, and being dissatisfied in the way city government was operating, especially insofar as economic development, Houston declared his candidacy for mayor, in 1978. After a five-candidate nonpartisan primary, in February 1979, Houston defeated Frank Madonia in the April general election, to be elected mayor. He was re-elected in 1983, finishing first, out of five candidates, in the primary, and then defeating James Dunham in the general municipal election.

In 1986, Houston sought and received the Republican nomination for Treasurer of Illinois, but lost the general election to Democrat Jerry Cosentino. The following year, Houston was defeated in his mayoral reelection bid.

== Post-mayoral career ==
After leaving the office of mayor, Houston entered the banking business, joining LaSalle National Bank, to serve as a consultant to some municipalities and governmental bodies, throughout the state. He later joined a subsidiary of Marine Bank in Springfield, subsequently becoming CEO of that subsidiary, and continuing with the bank, after it became Bank One, and then J.P. Morgan Chase. In 2005, Houston became the president and CEO of Town and Country Bank, and continues to serve as the chairman emeritus.

In September 1991, Governor Jim Edgar appointed Houston to the Governor's Human Resources Advisory Council, a blue-ribbon study committee to recommend improvements to the management of state government and the quality of its work force.

Houston has served as the chairman of St. John's Hospital. He was also the last chairman of the board of the Greater Springfield Chamber of Commerce, and is currently on the Board of Directors of the Downtown Springfield, Inc. Heritage Foundation, the Quantum Growth Partnership, and the Abraham Lincoln Council of the Boy Scouts of America. Houston ran for mayor of Springfield in 2003. He finished in third place in the primary election and did not qualify for the runoff.

== Re-election ==
In November 2010, Houston entered the race for Mayor of Springfield, the office he previously held. He was one of eight candidates seeking that office. In the February 2011 municipal primary, Houston surprised many observers with a strong first-place finish. He went on to win the April 5th general election by a wide margin, against the other three remaining candidates.

== Western Illinois University ==
On May 29, 1997, Houston was confirmed by the Illinois Senate to the Western Illinois University Board of Trustees. "The Dirty Western," a blog maintained by faculty members at Western Illinois University, questioned whether Houston's recent election as Mayor of Springfield creates a conflict of interest with his duties as chairman of the university's board of trustees since, as mayor, he will be promoting the interests of competing University of Illinois at Springfield. The university and Houston's legal counsel both found that there was no conflict of interest. On February 27, 2013, Governor Pat Quinn appointed Roger Clawson to succeed Houston on the Western Illinois University Board of Trustees.

Party political offices
| Preceded by John P. Dailey | Republican nominee for Illinois Treasurer; 1986 | Succeeded by Greg Baise |
