= Timothy Davlin =

American mayor

Timothy J. Davlin
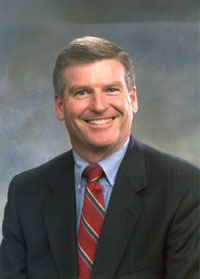

Mayor of Springfield, Illinois
- In office May 1, 2003 – December 14, 2010
- Preceded by: Karen Hasara
- Succeeded by: Frank Edwards

Personal details
- Born: August 27, 1957 Springfield, Illinois, U.S.
- Died: December 14, 2010 (aged 53) Springfield, Illinois, U.S.
- Cause of death: Suicide by gunshot
- Party: Democratic
- Spouse: Nancy L. Conway
- Children: 4
- Education: Sangamon State University
- Occupation: Politician

Timothy J. Davlin (August 27, 1957 – December 14, 2010) was the mayor of the U.S. city of Springfield, Illinois, from April 2003 until his suicide in December 2010 at age 53. Although the mayor's office is officially non-partisan, the Illinois capital has a strong tradition of partisanship, including municipal races. Both major parties of Sangamon County endorse candidates. Davlin had the backing of the Democratic Party.

== Background ==
Davlin was born on August 27, 1957, to Robert E. and Norene O'Brien Davlin. He attended Blessed Sacrament Grade School, Griffin High School and Springfield College (now known as Benedictine University at Springfield) (where he received his Associate Arts degree), all Roman Catholic schools. He later attended Sangamon State University (now known as the University of Illinois Springfield), where he earned his baccalaureate. He worked for the Sangamon County Sheriff's Office as a non-merit Deputy from 1980 to 1982. Davlin married Nancy L. Conway in 1977 and they had four children.

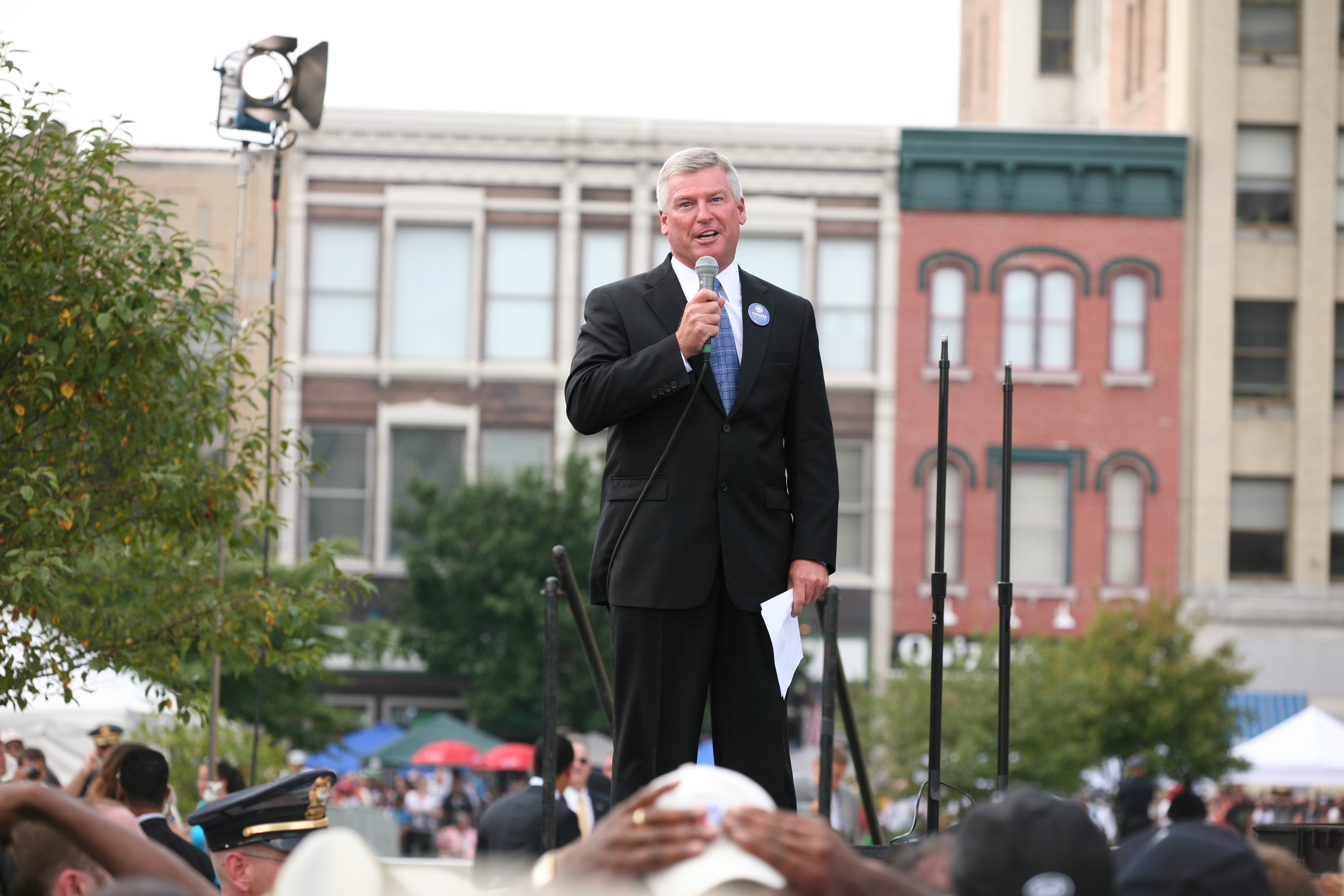
Davlin at the Barack Obama-Joe Biden vice presidential announcement on August 23, 2008, in Springfield, Illinois

Davlin started in the financial and insurance business in 1981 when he became a Registered Representative with AXA Advisor, LLC. He provided financial products and services to individuals and businesses. He sat on the board of directors of the Mid-West Truckers Association, Inc. and was a member of the Board of Directors of the Illinois Municipal League and the Greater Springfield Chamber of Commerce.

Davlin was a Past Grand Knight (four terms) and Past Trustee for the Knights of Columbus Council #364. He was one of the youngest men inducted into the Knights of Columbus Diocesan Hall of Fame for exemplary service to the organization. He was a member of St. Agnes' Parish in Springfield, and served on various fundraising committees during the construction on the church and its school.

He was a member of the Springfield Motor Boat Club and Illini Country Club. He was elected to a second term on April 19, 2007. However, the Republican-endorsed candidates unexpectedly won nearly every seat on the Springfield City Council, in that same election. Terms for Springfield municipal officials run for four years.

== Controversies ==
In May 2010 the Internal Revenue Service filed a notice of a Federal Tax Lien against Davlin for non-payment of taxes for the years 2003, 2005 and 2006. The amount of unpaid taxes was $89,702.11 He was also under scrutiny for actions as executor of his cousin's probate case.

Ultimately, a settlement was reached to recover money found missing from the estate of the late Margaret Ettelbrick after the suicide of her executor, Mayor Davlin. Under the agreement, $250,000 will be paid to Ettelbrick's estate from the deceased mayor's estate-about $90,000 less than was determined to be missing. Most of the money, in turn, will be paid to Catholic Charities, as specified in Ettelbrick's will. The money will come largely from the sale of Midwest Service Corp. stock owned by Davlin, much of which apparently was purchased using money from the Ettelbrick estate. Midwest Service Corp. is the parent company of the Mid-West Truckers Association.

Robert Davlin, the mayor's father, was one of the founders of the trucking association. Timothy Davlin was found dead of a self-inflicted gunshot on December 14, the day he was due in court to provide a final accounting of the Ettelbrick's estate. It was later learned that more than $340,000 was missing from the estate. In June 2011, McDermott filed claims for that amount against Davlin's estate. According to the claims, Davlin sold Ettelbrick's house for $46,449 less than it was worth, spent $85,512 on personal expenses and used $203,750 to buy stock in Midwest Service Corp.

Davlin's campaign fund was under scrutiny by the federal government at the time he took his life, according to a statement given to investigators by former City Water, Light and Power general manager Todd Renfrow, who told police that the U.S. attorney's office had subpoenaed Davlin's campaign records.

== Death ==
Davlin was found dead at his home on the morning of December 14, 2010 from a self-inflicted gunshot wound to the chest. He was 53 years old. He had been scheduled to appear in court that morning in the matter of the estate of his late cousin. There were allegations that $187,000 from the cousin's estate, which was earmarked for Catholic Charities, had disappeared. The investigation of his death was turned over to the Illinois State Police, the only law enforcement agency in the area with which Davlin had no immediate connection. An autopsy was scheduled for Wednesday, December 15, 2010, to verify the cause of death, according to the State Police and the Sangamon County coroner's office. Springfield Ward 3 Alderman Frank Kunz, who was the mayor pro tempore of the city of Springfield, was sworn into office the same day as the acting mayor of Springfield.

On December 28, 2010, Ward 1 Alderman Frank Edwards was sworn in as mayor relieving Frank Kunz as mayor pro tempore. The Springfield Superintendent of Schools, Illinois Governor Pat Quinn, Illinois Secretary of State Jesse White, U.S. Senator and Majority Whip Dick Durbin, U.S. Representative Aaron Schock, Illinois State Senator Larry Bomke, and Bishop Thomas John Paprocki of the Roman Catholic Diocese of Springfield in Illinois all released statements of condolence upon hearing of Mayor Davlin's death.

== Suicide ==
On January 20, 2011, Sgt. Brad Sterling of the Illinois State Police testified during an inquest hearing that Timothy Davlin had died of a self-inflicted gunshot wound. Sangamon County Coroner's office ruled the death as a suicide. Toxicology reports were negative for alcohol or drugs. A bullet was fired from a six-shot revolver and traveled through Davlin's heart and into the seat of a Lincoln Navigator owned by Davlin. Items found in the passenger area of the Navigator included the revolver, a police radio, and a cordless home telephone. It is unknown if a suicide note was found, as Sterling declined to answer questions.
