= Michael D. Curran =

American politician

Michael D. Curran (born September 23, 1945) is a retired politician and former Democratic member of the Illinois House of Representatives from 1983 to 1995. He was born in Fort Pierce, Florida and grew up in Quincy, Illinois. He earned a bachelor's degree from the University of Illinois at Urbana–Champaign. He retired from the Illinois House of Representatives and ran for Mayor of Springfield, losing to Karen Hasara. He and Vicki Mosley were the last two Democrats to represent Springfield in the Illinois General Assembly until the election of Andy Manar and Sue Scherer to the Illinois Senate and Illinois House, respectively. A year later, he ran for Congress in Illinois's 18th congressional district losing to incumbent Ray LaHood. In 2003, Curran was sentenced to one year in federal prison for abusing his position with the Illinois Secretary of State.

Preceded by District created	Member of the Illinois House of Representatives from the 100th district 1983 – 1995	Succeeded by Gwen Klingler
