= Samuel A. Bullard =

American architect

Samuel Alexander Bullard (March 25, 1853 – December 5, 1926) was an American architect, politician, and university trustee from Illinois. A graduate of the University of Illinois, Bullard established an architectural practice in Springfield, where he remained for the rest of his life. He was named a trustee of the university in 1889 and served twice as its chairman. Bullard designed several Richardsonian Romanesque buildings, often with family members as Bullard & Bullard. In 1923, he was elected mayor of Springfield, but died before completing his term.

== Biography ==
Samuel Alexander Bullard was born on a farm in Sangamon County, Illinois, on March 25, 1853. He attended public schools and then matriculated at the University of Illinois. While there, he edited the Daily Illini and was president of his class (1878). After teaching for a year, Bullard opened an architectural office in Springfield, Illinois. He frequently operated in partnership with his relatives as Bullard & Bullard, first with Robert A., then with George.

Bullard & Bullard specialized in Richardsonian Romanesque architecture. In 1888, the firm designed the Christ Episcopal Church, considered the finest Romanesque building in Springfield. Bullard was named a trustee of the University of Illinois in 1889. Two years later, he became president of that board, serving through 1893. From 1890 to 1894, he edited Reports of the Illinois Society of Engineers and Surveyors. In 1899, Bullard was tasked with elevating and adding a third floor to the former State Capitol, which was then being used as a courthouse. In 1904, he was again named president of the Illinois board. From 1923 until his death, he was mayor of Springfield.

Bullard died of a heart attack on December 5, 1926. Family members continued the Bullard & Bullard office in Springfield through the 1950s. He was a member of the Methodist Episcopalian church. He married Elsie Cornelia Elliott on April 19, 1882. They had four children: Helen Elizabeth, Edwin Elliott, Clark Wesley, and Elsie.

== Works ==
All works in Springfield unless otherwise noted

- Christ Episcopal Church (1888)
- Grace Evangelical Lutheran Church (1892)
- Kumler United Methodist Church (1887)
- Illinois National Bank Building (1894)
- Enos School (1898)
- Old State Capitol expansion (1899)
- Lincoln Tomb restoration (1899)
- First United Methodist Church (1899–1900), Chariton, Iowa, NRHP-listed
- Illinois State Arsenal (1901)
- First Methodist Episcopal Church of Delta (1910), Delta, Colorado, NRHP-listed
