= Jonathan C. Wright =

American politician

Jonathan Wright

Judge of the 11th Circuit Court of Illinois
- Incumbent
- Assumed office January 7, 2019
- Preceded by: Thomas Harris

Logan County State's Attorney
- In office December 3, 2012 – December 7, 2018
- Preceded by: Michael McIntosh
- Succeeded by: Brad Hague

Member of the Illinois House of Representatives from the 90th district
- In office June 21, 2002 – January 8, 2003
- Preceded by: John Turner
- Succeeded by: Jerry Mitchell (district renumbered)

Personal details
- Born: October 11, 1966 (age 59) Winfield, Illinois
- Party: Republican
- Spouse: Melanie
- Children: Five
- Education: Monmouth College (B.A.); Chicago-Kent College of Law (J.D.)
- Profession: Attorney

Jonathan C. Wright is an American politician who currently serves as a judge in Illinois's 11th Circuit. A member of the Republican Party, he served a partial term in the Illinois House of Representatives from June 21, 2001, until January 8, 2003, and served as the State's Attorney for Logan County, Illinois from December 3, 2012, to December 7, 2018.

== Early life ==
Wright was born October 11, 1966, in Winfield, Illinois and raised in the neighboring village of Carol Stream. He graduated from Monmouth College with a Bachelor of Arts and later from Chicago-Kent College of Law with a Juris Doctor. Upon receiving a position with the Illinois Attorney General he moved to Lincoln, Illinois. He met his wife Melanie with whom he has five children. Sometime prior to 2001, he went into private practice, which included serving as the city attorney for Atlanta, Illinois.

== Illinois House of Representatives ==
He was appointed to succeed Representative John Turner who was appointed to a judgeship on the Illinois 4th District Appellate Court. Soon after his appointment, in the decennial redistricting process, Wright was drawn into the same district as longtime Republican Gwenn Klingler of Springfield. Wright chose not to run for reelection. Klinger, a moderate, was defeated by conservative Rich Brauer of Petersburg in that cycle's Republican primary.

His committee assignments included; Agriculture; Judiciary I-Civil Law; Judiciary II-Criminal Law; and Labor. He served on the Special Committee for Prosecutorial Misconduct and was the minority spokesman for the Special Committees on Tobacco Settlement Proceeds. Notably, he was the sponsor of a bill to allow student-led school prayer in public schools. The bill was criticized due to Wright's hope that the bill would lead students to convert to Christianity. The bill itself did nothing but reiterate the rights students already had under the First Amendment to the United States Constitution. After the end of his term, he joined the Office of the Logan County State's Attorney as an Assistant State's Attorney.

== Campaigns for federal office ==
Wright became a candidate in the 2004 Republican primary for the U.S. Senate seat being vacated by Peter Fitzgerald. He ran on a conservative platform of opposition to same-sex marriage and support for the criminalization of abortion. He was the only candidate from either major party not from northern region of the state. In a year notable for a record number of millionaire candidates, Wright had to keep his day job during the primary campaign. A perpetual longshot throughout the campaign, he finished fifth of eight candidates, receiving 17,189 (2.3%) of 661,804 votes cast.

Republican Primary, United States Senate, March 16, 2004
Party	Candidate	Votes	%	±%
Republican	Jack Ryan	234,791	35.5%	
Republican	Jim Oberweis	155,794	23.5%	
Republican	Steven J. Rauschenberger	132,655	20.0%	
Republican	Andrew McKenna	97,238	14.7%	
Republican	Jonathan C. Wright	17,189	2.6%	
Republican	John Borling	13,390	2.0%	
Republican	Norm Hill	5,637	0.9%	
Republican	Chirinjeev Kathuria	5,110	0.8%	
Majority		78,997	11.9%	
Turnout		661,804		

In 2006, he briefly explored a campaign for Congress in Illinois's 18th congressional district before dropping out in favor of incumbent Ray LaHood.

== State’s Attorney ==
In 2012, Wright was elected Logan County State's Attorney, succeeding fellow Republican Michael McIntosh. He was sworn in on December 3, 2012. He was elected to a second term in 2016. Brad Hague, an Assistant State's Attorney, was appointed by the Logan County Board to succeed Wright as State's Attorney.

== Judge ==
In 2018, Wright was appointed by the Illinois Supreme Court to succeed Thomas Harris after Harris was elected to the appellette court. Wright's term as a judge began January 7, 2019. Wright sought election to the Eleventh Circuit which covers McLean, Ford, Livingston, Logan, Woodford in the 2020 general election. Wright won the election and was sworn in for a six-year term on December 7, 2020.
