= Larry Bomke =

American politician

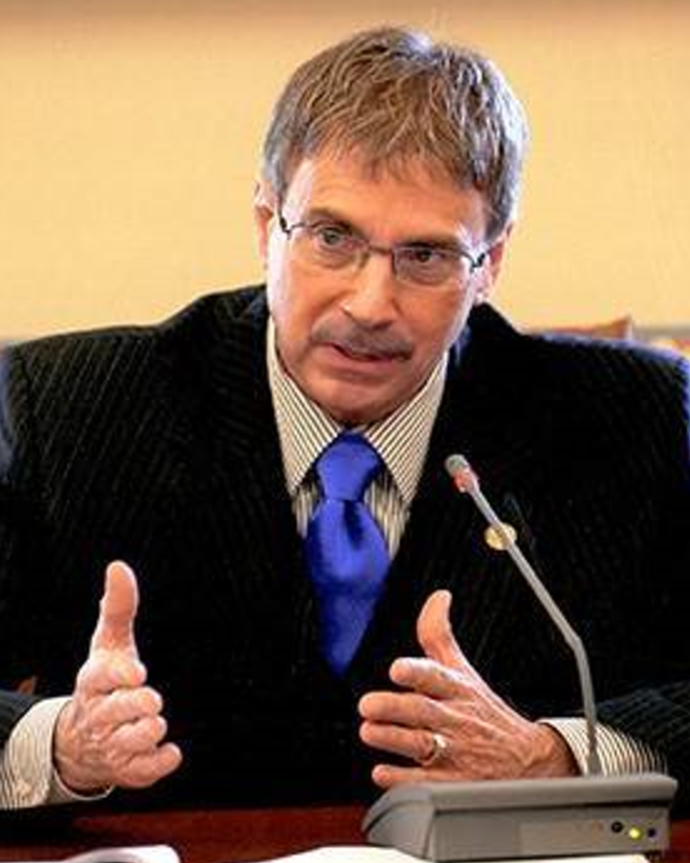
- Bomke during the 97th General Assembly

Member of the Illinois Senate from the 50th district
- In office July 1, 1995 – January 9, 2013
- Preceded by: Karen Hasara
- Succeeded by: Sam McCann

Personal details
- Born: June 6, 1950 (age 76) Springfield, Illinois
- Party: Republican
- Spouse: Sally Jo
- Children: Two
- Education: Lincoln Land Community College
- Profession: Independent Insurance Agent

Larry Bomke (born 1950) is a former Republican member of the Illinois Senate, representing the 50th district from 1995 to 2013.

== Early and personal life ==
Bomke was born June 6, 1950, in Springfield, Illinois. He attended Lincoln Land Community College. He married Sally Jo and has one son Wulf and one daughter, Natalie, who works as a reporter and anchor for WFLD.

== Political career ==
Bomke was a member of the Sangamon County Board for nineteen years. Bomke was appointed to the Illinois Senate on July 1, 1995, to succeed fellow Republican Karen Hasara after she became the Mayor of Springfield, Illinois. The 50th district, centered on the Springfield metropolitan area, included Sangamon and Menard counties as well as the eastern half of Cass County. During the 2001 decennial redistricting process, the 50th legislative district was redrawn to include Logan County and remove Cass County.

Bomke considers his major accomplishments to be the improvement of fairness within the state pension system, fighting for Rule of 85 which allows state employees to retire before age 65. His accomplishments also include the expansion of property tax grants, and discounted prescriptions to senior citizens. He also cites his sponsorship of a bill requiring health plans to cover 48-hour stays for newborns in hospitals, and advocates comprehensive crime legislation and ending 'excess privileges' for prisoners. Senator Bomke fought for comprehensive crime legislation, including public notification of a known sex offender moving into a community.

In February 2009, shortly after Governor Rod Blagojevich was removed from office and in the midst of the state's financial crisis, Bomke, announced a bill which targeted William Ayers for removal from his teaching position at the University of Illinois at Chicago. The proposal states that anyone "who has committed an act of violence against the governments of the United States or Illinois cannot work at a public university."

=== Committee assignments ===
Committees on Transportation, (minority spokesperson); Appropriations II; Financial Institutions; State Government and Veterans Affairs; Alzheimer's Disease Task Force; State Employees Suggestion Award Board, (chair); Legislative Printing Unit; Legislative Research Unit, (co-chair).
