= Gwen Klingler =

American politician

Gwenn Klingler (born May 28, 1944) is a former Republican member of the Illinois House of Representatives representing the 100th district from 1995 until 2003.

Gwenn Klingler was born on May 28, 1944, in Toledo, Ohio. She earned a B.A. from Ohio Wesleyan University and a J.D. from George Washington University Law School. She also earned an M.A. from the University of Michigan.

Klingler, then a member of the Springfield City Council, was initially slated to face Democratic incumbent Michael D. Curran. However, in August, Curran dropped out of the race, citing his inability to buy a new house after Republicans gerrymandered him out of the old 100th district. Marylou Lowder Kent, a Lincoln Land Community College trustee, replaced Curran on the ballot. Klinger won the 100th district with 20,890 votes to Lowder Kent's 19,581 votes. At the time, the 100th district, centered on Springfield, was located entirely in Sangamon County.

After the 2001 decennial redistricting process, Klingler was drawn into the same district as fellow Republican Jonathan C. Wright. Wright chose not to run for reelection. The new 100th district became substantially more rural adding more of rural Sangamon County, southwestern Logan County, and all of Menard County. Klinger, a moderate, was defeated by conservative Rich Brauer of Petersburg in that cycle's Republican primary.

In 2003, Klingler lost a race for Springfield City Treasurer to Jim Langfelder. During the 2008 Republican Party presidential primaries, Klingler endorsed the presidential campaign of Rudy Giuliani.
