= Tim Butler (politician) =

American politician

- Butler in November 2016

Member of the Illinois House of Representatives from the 87th district
- In office March 3, 2015 – December 31, 2022
- Preceded by: Rich Brauer
- Succeeded by: Jason Huffman

Personal details
- Born: March 20, 1967 (age 59) Peoria, Illinois
- Party: Republican
- Spouse: Wendy
- Education: Eastern Illinois University
- Profession: Congressional staffer

Timothy J. Butler (born March 20, 1967) was a Republican member of the Illinois House of Representatives representing the 87th district since March 3, 2015. The 87th district includes all or portions of Sangamon, Menard, Logan and Tazewell counties in Central Illinois.

== Pre-legislative life and career ==
Timothy J. Butler was born March 20, 1967. Butler graduated from Eastern Illinois University in 1990 with a Bachelor of Arts degree in Political Science. After graduating college he worked as a staff assistant for the United States House Committee on Education and Labor until 1994. He was the communications director for Congressman Ray LaHood from 1995 to 2009. He worked as the Director of Marketing for Saint John's Hospital from 2009 to 2012. From 2012 to 2015 he served as an advisor and District Chief of Staff to Representative Rodney Davis.

== Illinois House of Representatives ==
On February 28, 2015, Republican incumbent Rich Brauer, resigned to accept an appointment to a position as an Assistant Secretary for the Illinois Department of Transportation. After Brauer's resignation, the Republican Representative Committee of the Republican Party of the 87th District appointed Butler to the vacancy in the 87th district. Butler was sworn into office on March 3, 2015.

In 2019, Butler was named chair of the Illinois House Republican Conference. He has had assignments on the Museums, Arts & Cultural Enhancement Committee, the Environment Committee, Tourism & Conventions Committee, Transportation, Regulation, and Roads Committee, and the Transportation, Vehicles & Safety Committee.

From July 28, 2022 to February 13, 2023, Tim Butler was a member of the Illinois Republican State Central Committee representing Republicans residing in Illinois's 13th congressional district. Butler was elected to the position July 28, 2022. On February 13, 2023, the Illinois Republican Party announced that Myles Nelson would succeed Butler in the position.

After the 2022 general election, Butler announced he would resign from the 102nd General Assembly and not serve in the Illinois House in the 103rd General Assembly, instead opting to take a job with the Illinois Railroad Association. His resignation was effective December 31, 2022. Jason Huffman was appointed to the remainder of Butler's term in the 102nd General Assembly. Michael Coffey was appointed to fill the vacancy created by Butler's resignation in the 103rd General Assembly.
