= Stephen Glosecki =

Stephen O. Glosecki (1950 – 4 April 2007) was a scholar of Old English language and literature. Glosecki was raised in Springfield, Illinois, and educated at Sacred Heart-Griffin High School. He received his undergraduate degree from Beloit College, and his Master's and Ph.D. degrees from University of California, Davis. A professor of Old English at University of Alabama at Birmingham, he was the author of books and articles on Old English literature, particularly on shamanism and folklore, and was notable for his contributions to the anthropological study of early Germanic literature. He died of cancer in 2007, aged 55. A collection he edited, Myth in Early Northwest Europe, was published posthumously; his introduction was called "lively and, in places, poetic", and his translations of some of the Anglo-Saxon metrical charms were praised as "fluent, vigorous".

== Selected publications ==
- "Beowulf and the wills: Traces of totemism?" Philological Quarterly Vol. 78, Iss. 1/2, (Winter 1999): 14–47.
- Shamanism and Old English Poetry. New York: Garland, 1989.
- Myth in Early Northwest Europe (editor). Tempe: Arizona Center for Medieval and Renaissance Studies, in association with Brepols, 2007.
- "Judith" (trans.). Old English Poetry: An Anthology. Ed. Roy Liuzza. Peterborough: Broadview, 2014.
