= John Turner (Illinois politician) =

American judge

John W. Turner (born March 23, 1956) is an American judge and politician.

Born in Lincoln, Illinois, Turner received his bachelor's degree from University of Illinois in 1978. He then received his Juris Doctor from the DePaul University College of Law in 1981. He served as Logan County Public Defender from 1984 until 1987. Turner was elected Logan County State's Attorney and served from 1988 to 1994. Turner served in the Illinois House of Representatives from 1995 until 2001 and was a Republican. In 2001, Turner was appointed to the Illinois Appellate Court to fill the vacancy left by Rita B. Garman's appointment to the Illinois Supreme Court.

He was succeeded in the Illinois House by Jonathan C. Wright, an attorney from Hartsburg, Illinois. Turner was elected to the court in 2002 and retained in 2012. In January 2021, his wife Sally Turner, was appointed to the Illinois Senate. Turner retired on July 5, 2024. Raylene DeWitte Grischow, a Resident Circuit Judge in the Seventh Circuit for Sangamon County, was appointed to succeed him in office.
