= Jason Huffman =

American politician in Illinois

Member of the Illinois House of Representatives from the 87th district
- In office January 5, 2023 – January 11, 2023
- Preceded by: Tim Butler
- Succeeded by: Michael Coffey

Personal details
- Party: Republican

Jason Huffman is an American politician who briefly served as a member of the Illinois House of Representatives for the 87th district.

Huffman is a deputy sheriff who previously served as the county chair of Menard County.
