= Sangamon Auditorium =

Sangamon Auditoriums
- Interactive map of Sangamon Auditoriums
- Address: One University Plaza, MS PAC 397
- Location: Springfield, IL 62703-5407
- Coordinates: 39.7294°N 89.6185°W
- Operator: University of Illinois Springfield
- Seating type: Reserved seating
- Capacity: 2,000
- Public transit: SMTD

Website
- sangamonauditorium.org

Sangamon Auditorium is a 2,000-seat concert hall and performing arts center located in Springfield, Illinois, on the campus of the University of Illinois Springfield. It was built in 1981. It is the home of the Illinois Symphony Orchestra. Hal Holbrook opened the auditorium on February 21, 1981, with his one-man show, Mark Twain Tonight!, which he has reprised at the auditorium many times since. Over 2,000 events have been presented at the Auditorium since its opening (Sangamon Auditorium averages 100 events a year). These have included concerts, Broadway and stage shows, graduation ceremonies and various other events.

The largest concert hall in its namesake county, Sangamon Auditorium's seating capacity is divided into three levels; the main level contains a 61-seat orchestra pit, 425 orchestra seats, and 595 loge seats, while the mezzanine contains 564 seats and the balcony, 368 seats. It contains a 47.5-by-60-foot stage rising 30 feet high from stage floor to ceiling. The auditorium contains six backstage dressing rooms. Concession facilities include a main concession stand.

Sangamon Auditorium is part of the University of Illinois Springfield's Public Affairs Center, which also includes the 351-seat Studio Theatre, a TV studio, conference rooms, a food court, a restaurant, classrooms and administrative offices on its five levels. The Auditorium occupies the entire second level of the Public Affairs Center.
