= Misty Buscher =

American politician

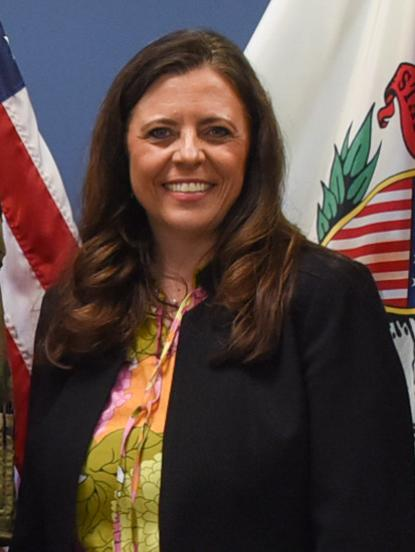

57th Mayor of Springfield
- Incumbent
- Assumed office May 5, 2023
- Preceded by: Jim Langfelder

Personal details
- Born: 1970 or 1971 (age 55–56) Carrollton, Illinois, U.S.
- Party: Democratic (before 2016); Republican (2016–present)
- Spouse: Mike Buscher
- Children: 2
- Education: Lincoln Land Community College (attended)

Misty Buscher (born 1970/1971) is the mayor of Springfield, Illinois, the state capital and seat of Sangamon County. She is the second female mayor in the history of Springfield.

== Early life ==
Buscher was born to Charles and Veronica Tozer in Carrolton, moved to Springfield in 7th grade, graduated from Rochester High School in 1988, and attended Lincoln Land Community College. She worked in the banking industry in Springfield for over 20 years, starting as a bank teller in 1988, and becoming a vice president of Marine Bank. Buscher is married to Mike Buscher, who unsuccessfully ran for Springfield city council in 2007, and is the sister in-law of former Springfield Deputy Chief of Police Cliff Buscher.

== Political career ==
Buscher served two terms as the city treasurer. In her initial run for city treasurer in 2015 Buscher was endorsed by the Sangamon County Democratic Party, though in 2016 she moved from independent to Republican and spoke favorably of Donald Trump's candidacy. In the 2019 city treasurer race Buscher ran successfully against Jennifer Notariano. As treasurer, Buscher clashed with mayor Jim Langfelder over street parking meters.

She defeated incumbent Langfelder in his bid for a third term as mayor in an upset.

== Electoral history ==
Springfield mayoral election, 2023
Candidate	Votes	Percentage
Misty Buscher	13,614	51.46%
Jim Langfelder	12,841	48.54%
Totals	26,336	100.00%

Springfield city treasurer election, 2019
Candidate	Votes	Percentage
Misty Buscher	17,616	74.07%
Jennifer Notariano	6,168	25.93%
Totals	23,784	100.00%

Springfield city treasurer election, 2015
Candidate	Votes	Percentage
Misty Buscher	14,811	56.50%
Frank Edwards	11,403	43.50%
Totals	26,214	100.00%

Political offices
Preceded by Jim Langfelder	Mayor of Springfield; 2023–present	Incumbent
