= Sacred Heart-Griffin High School =

Location
- 1200 West Washington Street; Springfield, Illinois 62702; United States; 39°48′4″N 89°40′27″W

Information
- School type: Private, Coeducational
- Motto: "Academic Excellence in a Community of Faith"
- Denomination: Roman Catholic
- Established: 1988
- Oversight: SHG Board of Directors
- Principal: Kara Rapacz
- Teaching staff: 56
- Grades: 9–12
- Enrollment: 840 (2013)
- Campus: Urban
- Colors: Black and gold
- Athletics conference: Central State Eight Conference
- Team name: Cyclones
- Accreditation: North Central Association of Colleges and Schools
- Newspaper: Campus Crier
- Tuition: US$6,375/$7,150
- Affiliation: Dominican
- Website: School website

Sacred Heart-Griffin High School, often abbreviated SHG, is a Catholic high school located in Springfield, Illinois, the city's largest private school. It is located in the Diocese of Springfield in Illinois.

The school opened in the fall of 1988 after Sacred Heart Academy, an all-girls Catholic high school merged with Griffin High School, an all-boys Catholic high school located across the street. Even prior to the merger, certain classes at both schools were taught on a co-educational basis.

The part of campus which formerly housed Griffin High School is now known as the West Campus. The part of campus which was home to Sacred Heart Academy is known as the East Campus. Both facilities are used by SHG, with most of the school's athletic facilities being located on the West Campus and the majority of the academic facilities being located on the East Campus. On the school's East Campus is a motherhouse for a Dominican order of religious sisters.

== Athletics ==
All of the sports teams are known as the "Cyclones". In the fall the school offers football, cross country, boys' soccer, boys' and girls' golf, girls' swimming, volleyball, and girls' tennis. In the winter SHG has boys and girls' basketball, cheerleading, hockey, poms, boys swimming, and wrestling. In the spring, baseball, softball, girls soccer, boys and girls track, and boys tennis are played.

The school won state championships in football in 2005, 2006, 2008, 2013, 2014 and 2022, with runner-up finishes in 1975, 1982, 1995, 2003, 2016 and 2021. In baseball, the Cyclones were State Champions in 1964, 1987 and 2025 while earning second-place finishes in 1982 and 2014 and a fourth place finish in 2021. In soccer, Sacred Heart-Griffin claimed state crowns in 1998 and 2002 in addition to a runner-up finish in 1999. On the links, the boys golf team won state golf championships in 1979, 1980 and 2023 while the girls team claimed a state championship in 1996 and runner-up finishes in 2024 and 2025. The Girls Cross Country team won back to back State AA Championships in 2007 and in 2008. SHG's softball team also had state appearances in 2015 and 2016. In 2022, the boys' basketball team won the school's first state championship in basketball. In 2020, the boys basketball team reached the semi-finals of the boys state basketball tournament for the first time in school history only to have the last weekend of the tournament cancelled due to the Covid-19 Pandemic. The Cyclones of Cathedral High School, an all-boys predecessor to SHG, won a Catholic State Championship in basketball in 1939. In 2009 the school built a $6,000,000 football stadium.

== Notable people ==
- Sam Antonacci, baseball infielder in the Chicago White Sox organization
- Stephen Glosecki (1950 – 2007), scholar of Old English
- Ryan Held, swimmer, 2016 Olympics gold medalist
- Matt Mitrione, former NFL player; mixed martial artist
- Ryan O'Malley, former MLB pitcher
- Eric Peterman, former NFL player
- Malik Turner, NFL player
- Albert Okwuegbunam, NFL player
- Dick Schofield, former MLB player
- Jeff Fassero, former MLB pitcher
- Joe Slusarski, former MLB Pitcher
- Karen Hasara, Illinois State Senator, State Representative, and Mayor of Springfield, Illinois.
- Kevin Vann, Bishop of Fort Worth, Texas and Bishop of Orange in California
- J. Michael Houston, Mayor of Springfield, Illinois.
- Edmund Hull, diplomat
- John E. Franz chemist

== See also ==
- Catholic schools in the United States
