= First Methodist Episcopal Church of Delta =

Historic church in Colorado, United States

- U.S. National Register of Historic Places
- Colorado State Register of Historic Properties
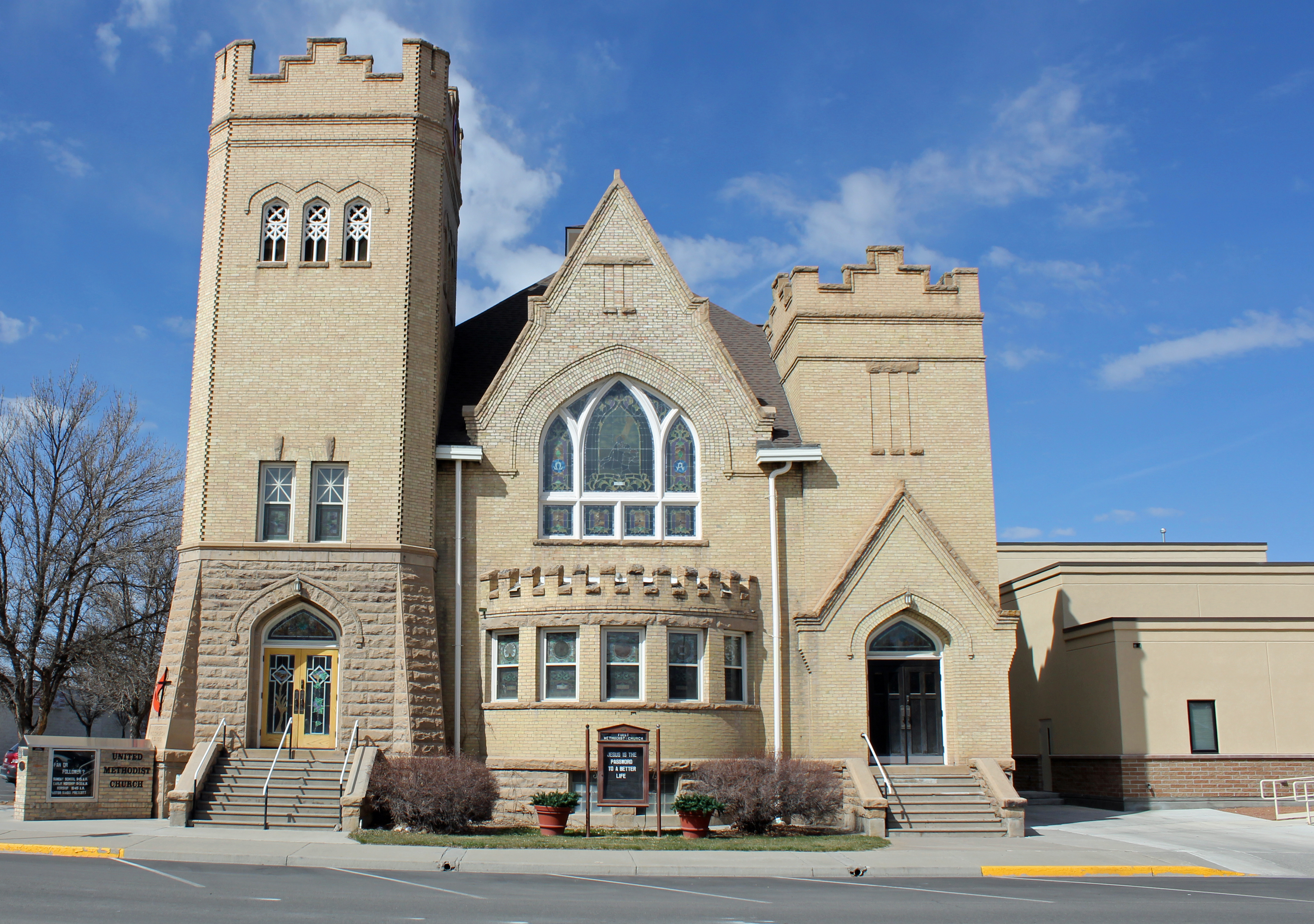
- The church in 2013.

- Location within Colorado Location within the United States
- Location: 199 E. Fifth St., Delta, Colorado
- Coordinates: 38°44′25″N 108°4′9″W
- Area: less than one acre
- Built: 1910
- Architects: Bullard & Bullard; Samuel A. Bullard
- Architectural style: Bungalow/craftsman, Tudor Revival
- NRHP reference No.: 91000069
- CSRHP No.: 5DT.896
- Added to NRHP: February 20, 1991

The First Methodist Episcopal Church of Delta (also known as the First Methodist Church of Delta and Delta United Methodist Church) is a church located at 199 E. Fifth St. in Delta, Colorado, United States

== History ==
The church was built in 1910 in the Tudor Revival style. It was designed by Samuel A. Bullard of Springfield, Illinois architects Bullard & Bullard, or, rather, plans were bought from that company.

It was listed on the National Register of Historic Places in 1991. Its parsonage was included as a second contributing building in that listing, and reflects Bungalow/Craftsman architecture. The church has also been known as First Methodist Church of Delta and as Delta United Methodist Church.
