= Frank Edwards (Illinois politician) =

American local politician (1950–2020)

Mayor of Springfield, Illinois
- In office December 28, 2010 – April 29, 2011
- Preceded by: Timothy Davlin (mayor); Frank Kunz (mayor pro tem.)
- Succeeded by: J. Michael Houston

Personal details
- Born: September 16, 1950
- Died: January 28, 2020 (aged 69) Sangamon County, Illinois, U.S.
- Party: Republican
- Spouse: Cinda Janssen (m. 1983)
- Children: 1
- Education: Eastern Illinois University
- Occupation: Springfield alderman; Business owner

Military service
- Allegiance: United States
- Branch/service: Air National Guard
- Years of service: 1969–1975
- Rank: Sergeant

Frank Edwards (September 16, 1950 – January 28, 2020) was an American politician who served as mayor of Springfield, Illinois. He was appointed by the Springfield City Council on December 28, 2010, to the vacancy caused by the death of Mayor Tim Davlin. He was succeeded by J. Michael Houston on April 29, 2011.

Edwards served as alderman for the city's first ward since 2003 and sought re-election to that office. Before becoming an elected official, Edwards served as Springfield's fire chief.

== Early life and career ==
Frank Edwards was born in 1950. His mother was a nurse and his father was a letter carrier who served in World War II. Edwards served in the Illinois Air National Guard while in college and attained the rank of Sergeant, before earning an honorable discharge in 1975.

After earning an Education degree from Eastern Illinois University, Edwards worked as a special education mathematics teacher. Through the local park district, he also taught physical education and swimming at Springfield Southeast High School. On a dare from his mother, who had seen a local newspaper notice for the firefighters exam, Frank took, and passed, the test. Twenty-six years later, on February 23, 2001, he would become the Chief of the Springfield, Illinois fire department.

== Political activities ==
In 2003, Edwards was elected to the City Council, with 53% of the vote, in Springfield's first ward. He was unopposed for re-election in 2007. In addition to municipal government, Edwards also briefly sought the Republican nomination for Governor of Illinois in 2009, but withdrew before the primary election.

On December 28, 2010, during a special City Council meeting, called following the unexpected death of Mayor Tim Davlin, Edwards was chosen as mayor by a 6 to 4 vote of the council. He subsequently resigned his position as Alderman (to serve as Mayor), but was reelected to that Ward 1 position.

In the April 5, 2011 general election, Edwards was elected to the Ward 1 City Council seat, garnering over 60% of the vote. His tenure as Mayor ended on April 29, 2011, when new municipal officers were sworn in.

In 2015, Edwards was term-limited on the city council, and he ran for city treasurer. He lost to future mayor Misty Buscher.

In 2019, Edwards ran for mayor of Springfield, but lost to the incumbent Democrat Jim Langfelder.

== Personal life ==
Edwards' wife, Cinda, was also an elected official, serving as a Trustee of the Illinois Community College Board and Coroner of Sangamon County. They co-owned an auto body repair and welding service. They had one son.

== Death ==
On January 28, 2020, Edwards (aged 69), his wife Cinda (aged 63) and 69-year-old John Evans of Glenarm, were killed in the crash of a twin-engine Piper Aerostar 601 on approach to Abraham Lincoln Capital Airport in Sangamon County. The flight had originated at Sarasota–Bradenton International Airport in Florida, with a stopover for fuel at Huntsville, Alabama.

A final report issued by the National Transportation Safety Board (NTSB) determined that the probable cause of the crash was Edwards’ failure to follow the instrument landing system (ILS) guidance during the final approach. The report noted that light fog and mixed icing conditions were present in the area at the time of the accident. Edwards had also reported an issue with the airplane's navigation indicator, and the investigation revealed that a replacement horizontal situation indicator (HSI) had been ordered, although it was unclear whether the malfunctioning HSI had been replaced before the flight. The HSI sustained significant thermal and fire damage during the crash, preventing further testing, while a post‑accident examination of the aircraft's engines did not reveal any anomalies.
