= William Telford =

American politician (1912–2003)

Mayor of Springfield
- In office April 6, 1971 – April 8, 1979
- Preceded by: Nelson O. Howarth
- Succeeded by: J. Michael Houston

Personal details
- Born: June 15, 1912 Springfield, Illinois, U.S.
- Died: August 21, 2003 (aged 91) Naples, Florida, U.S.
- Party: Republican
- Spouse(s): LaVerne Marlowe (m. 1944; div. 1947) Pauline McCormick (m. 1947; died 2000)
- Education: Northern Illinois School of Optometry

Military service
- Branch/service: U.S. Army
- Years of service: 1942–1946

William Telford (June 15, 1912 – August 21, 2003) was an American politician who served as mayor of Springfield, Illinois. He served for two consecutive terms, from 1971 to 1979. He was succeeded by J. Michael Houston on April 10, 1979.

Telford served as Sangamon County's coroner for 19 years before deciding to run for Mayor.

== Early life and career ==
William Telford was born in Springfield, Illinois, in 1912, the son of William C. Sr. and Amelia Cairns Telford. He graduated from Springfield High School, and attended Northern Illinois School of Optometry, where he graduated in 1932. He operated his own optometry office in Springfield for 10 years, before enlisting in the U.S. Army during World War II. Telford was stationed at Jefferson Barracks, MO., where he had charge of all eye examinations and prescribed eye glasses for the station hospital.

After four years of service, he was honorably discharged in 1946, and went to work at the J. Ralph Tobin and Son Optometry department in Springfield.

== County Coroner ==
With no political experience, Telford entered the race for Sangamon County Coroner in January 1952. He won the GOP primary in April 1952, and was elected Coroner in the General Election in November 1952. He would be re-elected four more times as Coroner.

== Mayor ==
In late 1970, Telford confirmed that he was interested in running for Mayor. He said that if the proposed Constitution of Illinois is adopted, it would allow municipalities to abolish the Coroner as an elected official. During his campaign, he agreed that if elected Mayor, he would immediately resign his position as coroner. On April 6, 1971, William Telford was elected Mayor of Springfield, Illinois.

During his first term in office, Mayor Telford welcomed then-President Richard Nixon to Springfield, as Nixon signed the Lincoln Home Bill, which made the four block area surrounding Abraham Lincoln's home a national historic site.

Mayor Telford, along with the City Council, had the plaza in front of the City Municipal Building (City Hall) named Howarth Plaza, commemorating his predecessor, former Mayor Nelson Howarth. Only a week later, Telford engaged the former Mayor to be a legal advisor for the City of Springfield. Howarth, a licensed attorney, assumed his private practice after leaving the Mayor's office only a week prior, said he looks forward "to helpful to the mayor in any way I can."

In October 1974, Telford announced he would run for re-election. He was re-elected Mayor the following April, receiving almost 60% of the vote. He was challenged and defeated his predecessor, Nelson Howarth.

== Personal life ==
William Telford married his first wife, LaVerne Marlowe of Springfield on March 3, 1944. The marriage would only three years, ending in a divorce in March 1947. Telford would go on to marry again later that same year, to Pauline L. McCormick, also of Springfield, on August 2, 1947. The couple would not have any biological children of their own, however Mrs. Telford did have a daughter from a previous marriage.

Pauline Telford was a newspaper reporter, and would later go on to become the Women's Editor of the local Springfield newspapers, The Illinois State Journal and The Illinois State Register, later to be merged and become The State Journal-Register. She worked for the newspaper from 1960 until retiring in February 1977.

== Death ==
After leaving office, the Telfords would spend winters in their second home in Naples, Florida. They moved to Florida permanently in 1991. Mrs. Telford died in May 2000 at the age of 90. Mr. Telford died three years later, August 2003, at the age of 91.
