= First United Methodist Church (Chariton, Iowa) =

- U.S. National Register of Historic Places
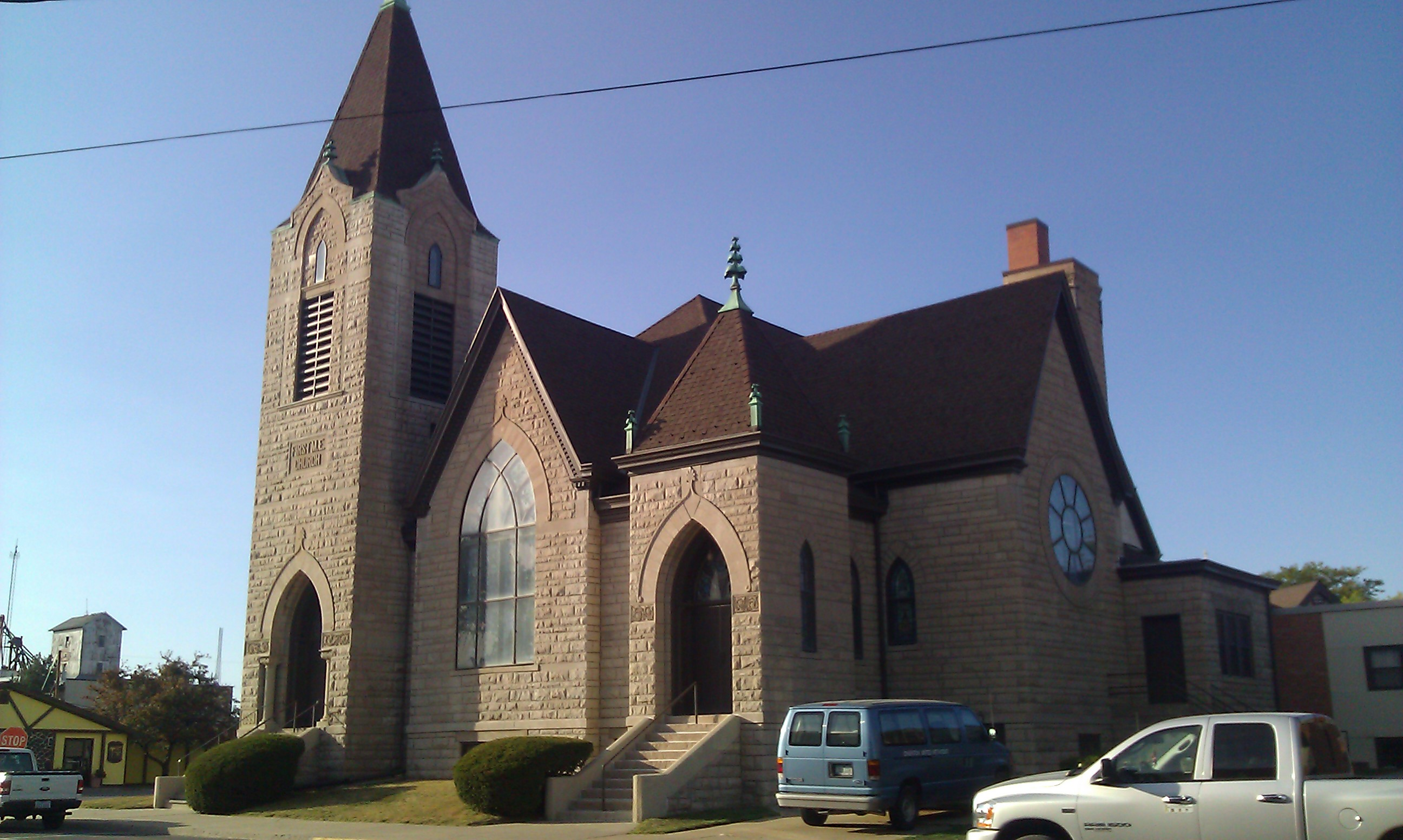

- Location within Iowa Location within the United States
- Location: 923 Roland; Chariton, Iowa
- Coordinates: 41°1′1″N 93°18′28″W
- Area: less than one acre
- Built: 1899-1900
- Architect: = Bullard, S.A.; et al.
- Architectural style: Late Gothic Revival
- NRHP reference No.: 01001485
- Added to NRHP: January 24, 2002

First United Methodist Church is a historic church at 923 Roland in Chariton, Iowa, USA.

It was built during 1899-1900 and was added to the National Register of Historic Places in 2002.

It replaced an earlier Methodist church on the site, a brick Greek Revival-style church that was built in 1864. It was deemed significant as "a fine, unaltered example of turn of the century Gothic Revival design by well known Illinois architect, Samuel A. Bullard".
