= Strawbridge-Shepherd House =

Historic house in Illinois, United States

- U.S. National Register of Historic Places
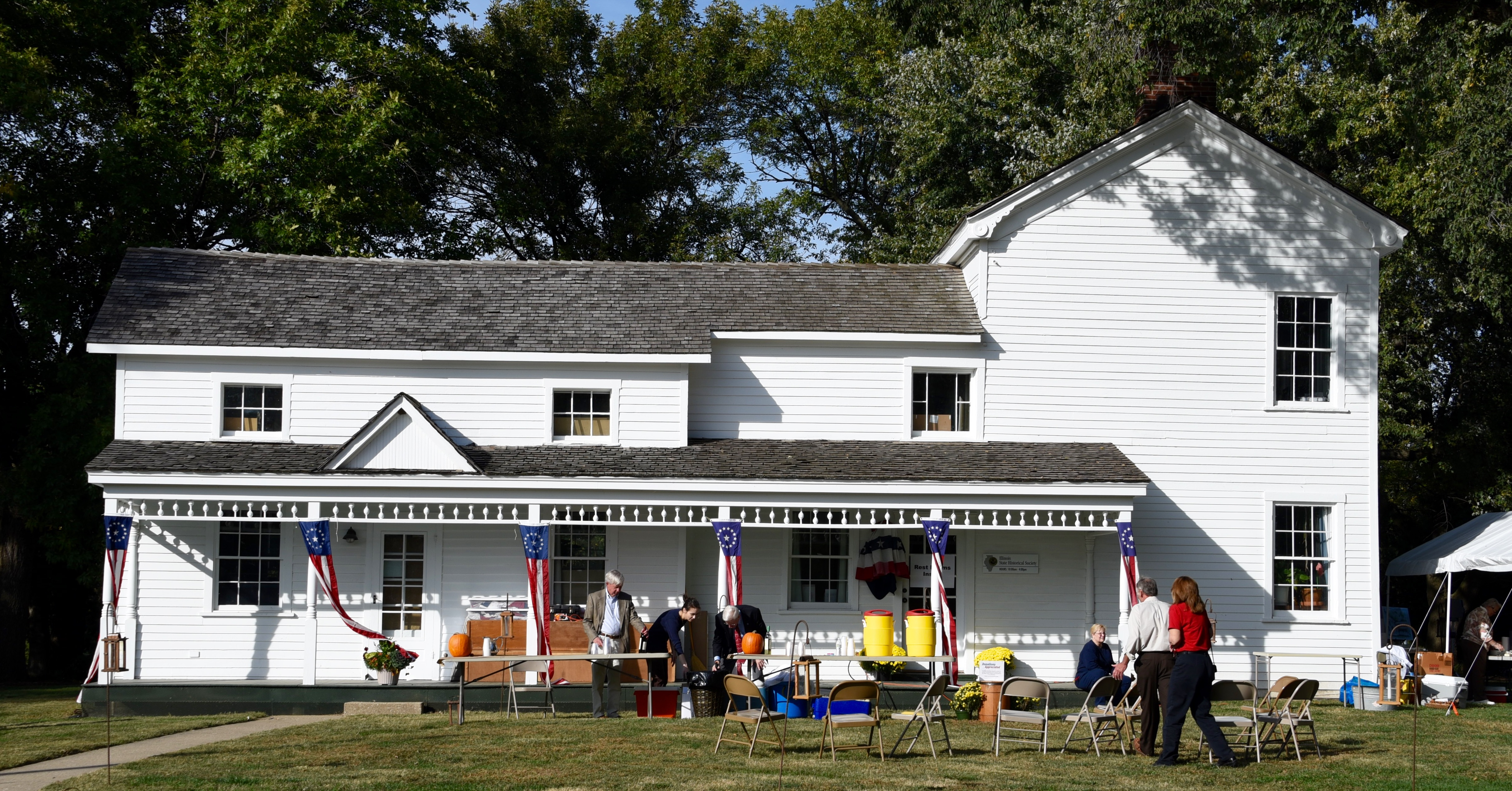

- Location within Illinois Location within the United States
- Location: 5255 Shepherd Rd., Springfield, Illinois
- Coordinates: 39°43′22″N 89°37′0″W
- Built: c. 1845
- Architectural style: Greek Revival, Queen Anne
- NRHP reference No.: 15000317
- Added to NRHP: June 8, 2015

The Strawbridge-Shepherd House is a historic house located at 5255 Shepherd Road in Springfield, Illinois. Saddle and harness maker Thomas Strawbridge built the house for himself circa 1845. The original house was a two-story Greek Revival structure, a popular design choice at the time; it is one of the best-preserved Greek Revival houses in the Springfield area. Key Greek Revival elements of the house include its wide cornice trim resembling an entablature and the pilasters, sidelights, and transom around the front door. An addition from circa 1865 gave the house an "L" shape and added a new kitchen. Civil War veteran Charles M. Shepherd purchased the house in 1883. Shepard made several additions and modifications to the house; many of these added Queen Anne elements, such as the two porches with decorative spindlework.

The building was acquired by the University of Illinois Springfield in 1970. It is currently occupied by the Illinois State Historical Society.

The house was added to the National Register of Historic Places on June 8, 2015.
