= John Davidson (Illinois politician) =

American politician

John A. Davidson

Member of the Illinois Senate from the 50th district
- In office 1973–1993
- Preceded by: Robert W. McCarthy
- Succeeded by: Karen Hasara

Personal details
- Born: August 31, 1924 West Point, Mississippi
- Died: August 21, 2012 (aged 87) Springfield, Illinois
- Party: Republican
- Spouse: Shirley
- Profession: Chiropractic physician

Military service
- Branch/service: United States Navy
- Years of service: 1943-1946
- Unit: Navy Air Corp
- Battles/wars: World War II

John A. Davidson (August 31, 1924 – August 21, 2012) was an American politician and practicing chiroprater.

Born in West Point, Mississippi, Davidson graduated from Petersburg, Illinois High School. Davidson served in the Illinois Senate 1973–1993. He served in the United States Navy Air Corp during World War II and was a chiropractor. He served on the Sangamon County, Illinois Board and was chairman of the board prior to being elected to the Illinois Senate. In 1971, he was a delegate to the White House Conference on Aging. During his tenure at the Senate, Davidson was known to massage the backs of fellow politicians on a $5,000 table from the Illinois Chiropractic Society.

He died due to congestive heart failure on August 21, 2012, in Springfield, Illinois.

== Sources ==
- Memoirs of Senator John Davidson
