= Dulcinea Langfelder =

Multidisciplinary artist (1955–2025)

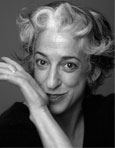
- Born: February 6, 1955; New York City, U.S.
- Died: January 26, 2025 (aged 69)
- Known for: Founder of Dulcinea Langfelder & Co.

Dulcy Langfelder, better known as Dulcinea Langfelder, (February 6, 1955 – January 26, 2025) was an American multidisciplinary artist (drama, dance, song, mime, multimedia). Born in Brooklyn, New York she was the founder of Dulcinea Langfelder & Co.

== Background ==
Langfelder was born in New York City on February 6, 1955. She studied dance with Paul Sanasardo, then mime with the master, Étienne Decroux, in Paris. She has studied theatre with Eugenio Barba and Yoshi Oida. When Decroux's assistants, Jean Asselin and Denise Boulanger, returned to Montreal to establish their company, they invited Dulcinea to join la Troupe Omnibus. She moved to Montreal in 1978.

Langfelder signed choreographies in over twenty musical comedy and television productions. Her diversified talent, her socio-satiric sense and her inspiration garnered her the honor of being named Personality of the year by the Montreal daily, La Presse, in 1990.

Langfelder died on January 26, 2025, at the age of 69.

== Main plays ==
- 2018: Cheek to Cheek, l'amour avec un grand C
- 2016: Pillow Talk
- 2008: Dulcinea's Lament
- 1999: Victoria
- 1994–1997: Portrait of Woman With Suitcase
- 1990: Hockey! O.K.?
- 1988–1996: The Lady Next Door
- 1985: Vicious Circle

== The Company ==
In 1985, she founded her own company which she named Virtuous Circle Dance theatre. Since then her works have toured around the world. In 1997, she changed her company's name to Dulcinea Langfelder & Co.

Dulcinea Langfelder & Co. is a non-profit organization that creates and presents multidisciplinary shows worldwide. The company aims to brighten life with entertaining creations that also refresh our minds and souls. With a tragicomic background, her work combines drama, dance and multimedia, going through disciplinary and cultural barriers.

Dulcinea Langfelder & Co. created a total of seven shows, which have been broadcast in 7 languages on 5 continents.

== Awards ==
- 2010: Certificate of recognition for the Prix Hommage, Quebec Council for Elders, to Dulcinea Langfelder for her contribution to the betterment of the elder community's well-being, quality of life and participation in Quebec society.
- 2007: Herald Angel, Edinburgh, for Victoria: critics prize of The Herald to recognize the excellence at the Edinburgh Fringe Festival (more than 2000 different shows are presented during the festival)
- 2005 : " Favorite of the public " for Victoria played during the theatre festival L'Assomption, Quebec
- 2000: Montreal English Critics Circle Award (MECCA), Montreal to Ana Cappelluto for her stage design in Victoria (price of the Anglophones Montrealers critics circle).
- 1990: " Year Personality in Dance " to Dulcinea Langfelder by the newspaper La Presse, Montreal
