= Michael Coffey (Illinois politician) =

State Representative in Illinois

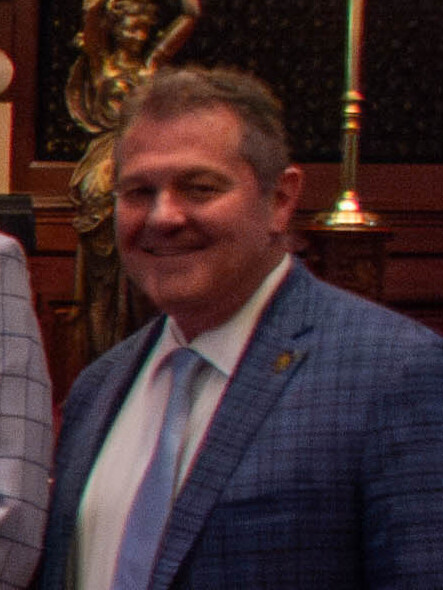
- Coffey in 2025

Member of the Illinois House of Representatives from the 95th district
- Incumbent
- Assumed office January 11, 2023
- Preceded by: Jason Huffman

Personal details
- Born: Springfield, IL
- Party: Republican
- Education: University of Illinois

Michael Coffey is an American politician who serves as a member of the Illinois House of Representatives for the 95th district.
