= Jim Langfelder =

American politician

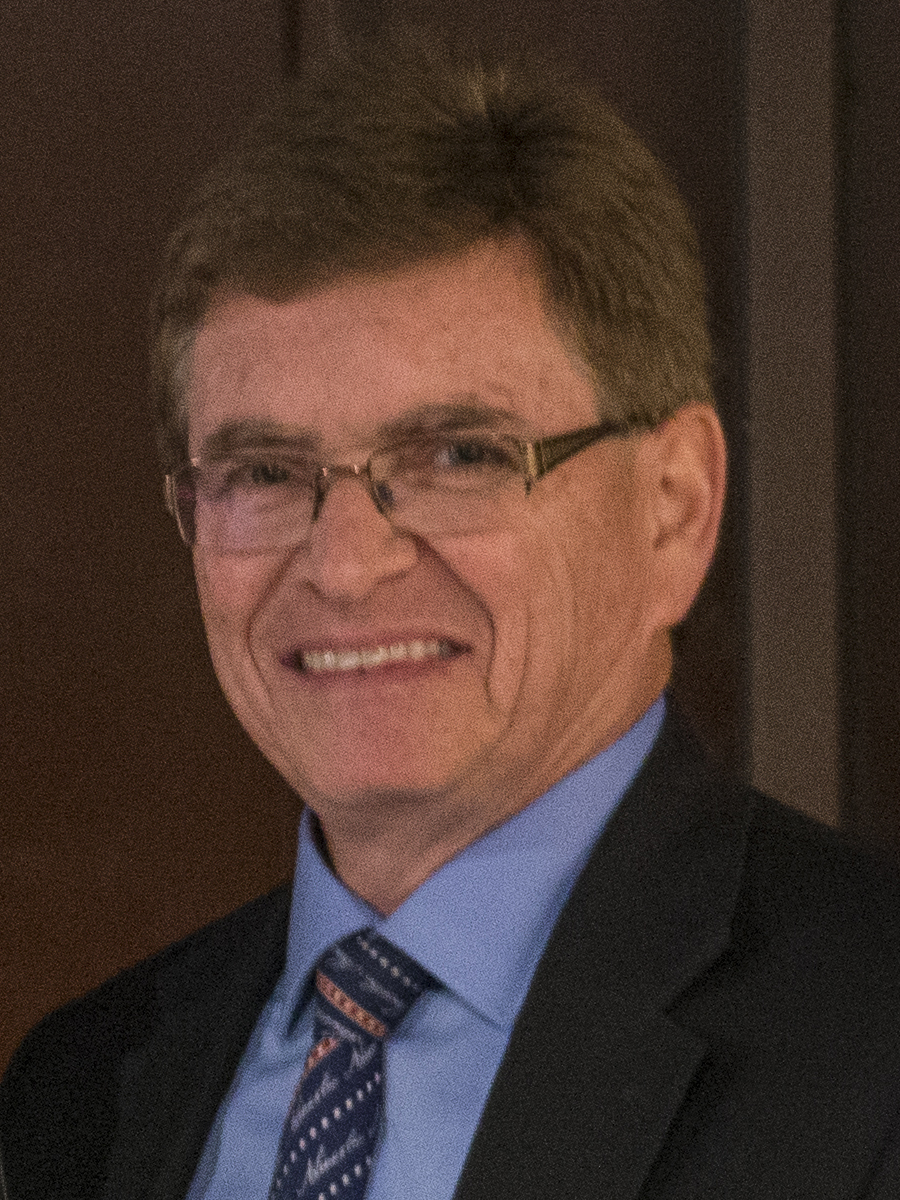

56th Mayor of Springfield
- In office May 7, 2015 – May 5, 2023
- Preceded by: J. Michael Houston
- Succeeded by: Misty Buscher

Personal details
- Born: January 16, 1960 (age 66) Springfield, Illinois, U.S.
- Party: Democratic
- Spouse: Billie
- Children: 3
- Relatives: Ossie Langfelder (father)
- Education: Lincoln Land Community College; University of Illinois, Springfield (BA)

Jim Langfelder (born January 16, 1960) is the former mayor of Springfield, Illinois, the state capital and seat of Sangamon County. Prior to his election to Mayor of Springfield, he served as the city treasurer for three terms spanning from 2003 to 2015. Municipal offices in Illinois are legally nonpartisan, however, Langfelder is a member of the Democratic Party.

== Early life ==
Langfelder was born in 1960 to Midge and Ossie Langfelder (who served as mayor from 1987 to 1995). He grew up in Springfield, one of thirteen children, attending both public and private schools. He went on to earn degrees at Lincoln Land Community College and the Sangamon State University. After college, he went into banking working in multiple roles at First of America Bank between 1988 and 1998 and later as business development officer at Security Bank.

== Political career ==
Langfelder was elected City Treasurer in 2003 defeating former state legislator Gwenn Klingler.

In August 2014, Langfelder formally announced his candidacy for Mayor of Springfield joining a field that included incumbent mayor J. Michael Houston and Springfield Auditor Paul Palazzolo. During the campaign Langfelder campaigned on being a consensus mayor in a very political city with a platform that included a free wifi zone in the downtown area, targeted employment sectors, boosting redevelopment of old downtown buildings, a focus on renewable energy at the public utility, and assisting city council members in creating individual plans for their ward that could serve as part of the city plan and having at least one member of his cabinet be African American.

He won the February primary election in a five candidate field with 40% of the vote and won the April runoff election against Paul Palazzolo with 55% of the vote. During the election, he earned the endorsements of the Sangamon County Democratic Party, the Inner City Older Neighbourhoods organization, the State Journal-Register, and local labor unions including the Central Illinois Building and Construction Trades Council, the Central Illinois Trades and Labor Council and AFSCME Council 31.

In 2019, Langfelder was elected to a second term, defeating Republican Frank Edwards.

In 2023, Langfelder lost his bid for a third term as mayor to Springfield city treasurer Misty Buscher.

== Electoral history ==
Springfield mayoral primary election, 2015
Candidate	Votes	Percentage
Mike Houston	3,182	18.72%
Paul Palazzolo	5,876	34.58%
Jim Langfelder	6,778	39.88%
Gail Simpson	776	4.57%
Samuel L. Johnson	382	2.25%
Totals	16,994	100.00%

Springfield mayoral election, 2015
Candidate	Votes	Percentage
Jim Langfelder	14,918	55.03%
Paul Palazzolo	12,191	44.97%
Totals	27,109	100.00%

Springfield mayoral election, 2019
Candidate	Votes	Percentage
Jim Langfelder	14,642	58.11%
Frank Edwards	10,557	41.89%
Totals	25,199	100.00%

Springfield mayoral election, 2023
Candidate	Votes	Percentage
Misty Buscher	13,614	51.46%
Jim Langfelder	12,841	48.54%
Totals	26,336	100.00%

Political offices
Preceded by J. Michael Houston	Mayor of Springfield; 2015–2023	Succeeded by Misty Buscher
