= Ossie Langfelder =

American politician (1926–2015)

Mayor of Springfield, Illinois
- In office 1987–1995
- Preceded by: J. Michael Houston
- Succeeded by: Karen Hasara

Personal details
- Born: August 2, 1926 Austria
- Died: October 21, 2015 (aged 89)
- Party: Democratic
- Spouse: Mary "Midge" Dunham (m. 1952)
- Children: 13, including Jim Langfelder
- Occupation: Politician

Military service
- Allegiance: United States
- Branch/service: United States Army
- Years of service: 1945–1946

Ossie Langfelder (August 2, 1926 – October 21, 2015) was the Democratic mayor of Springfield, Illinois, the state capital and seat of Sangamon County. He served from 1987 to 1995. He was the father of Jim Langfelder, who served as the mayor of Springfield in 2015–2023.

== Biography ==
Langfelder was born in 1926 in Austria, the son of a Jewish father and a Lutheran mother. In 1939, shortly after Adolf Hitler's invasion of Austria, the family fled to Switzerland, moving to the United States and settling in Springfield in 1940. Langfelder served in the United States Army from 1945 to 1946. He married Mary "Midge" Dunham in 1952; the couple would have 13 children. One of them, Jim, would be elected mayor of Springfield in 2015. Another, Josh, would be elected Sangamon County Recorder in 2008. Langfelder died in 2015 at the age of 89, six months after his son Jim was elected mayor.
