= Rich Brauer =

American politician

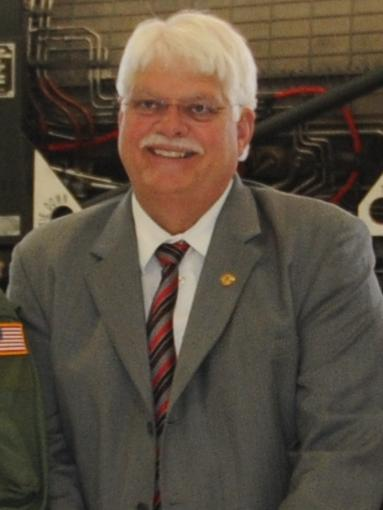

Member of the Illinois House of Representatives from the 87th district
- In office January 9, 2003 – February 20, 2015
- Preceded by: Gwen Klingler
- Succeeded by: Tim Butler

Personal details
- Born: July 14, 1954 (age 72) Springfield, Illinois
- Party: Republican
- Spouse: Nesa (m. 1981)
- Children: Two daughters
- Profession: Farmer

Rich Brauer is a Republican member of the Illinois House of Representatives, representing the 87th district since 2003. A native of Petersburg, IL, Brauer upset incumbent Gwen Klingler in the 2002 Republican primary, after re-districting resulted in rural areas outside of Springfield being in his district.

The Democrats had not even run a candidate in the primary, for this office, expecting Klingler to win, but placed former Republican elected official Carl Oblinger, son of former state legislator Josephine Oblinger, on the ballot as their nominee for the general election. Brauer prevailed, with over 60% of the vote, and has not had a Democratic opponent since.

During the 2008 Republican Party presidential primaries, Brauer ran to be a delegate to the 2008 Republican National Convention from Illinois's 18th congressional district for the presidential campaign of former Governor Mitt Romney.

On February 18, 2015, just three months after winning re-election, Brauer submitted his letter of resignation to the Clerk of the Illinois House of Representatives. His resignation came into effect on February 20, 2015. Hours after his resignation, it was announced that Bruce Rauner would appoint him Assistant Secretary of the Illinois Department of Transportation. The Republican Representative Committee of the Republican Party of the 87th District appointed Tim Butler to the vacancy left by Brauer.

In 2017, Brauer moved from (IDOT) to the Illinois Department of Natural Resources (IDNR). Brauer was appointed to serve as an assistant director at IDNR. Brauer served in the assistant director position until March 31, 2019.
