= Christ Episcopal Church (Springfield, Illinois) =

Historic church in Illinois, United States

- U.S. National Register of Historic Places
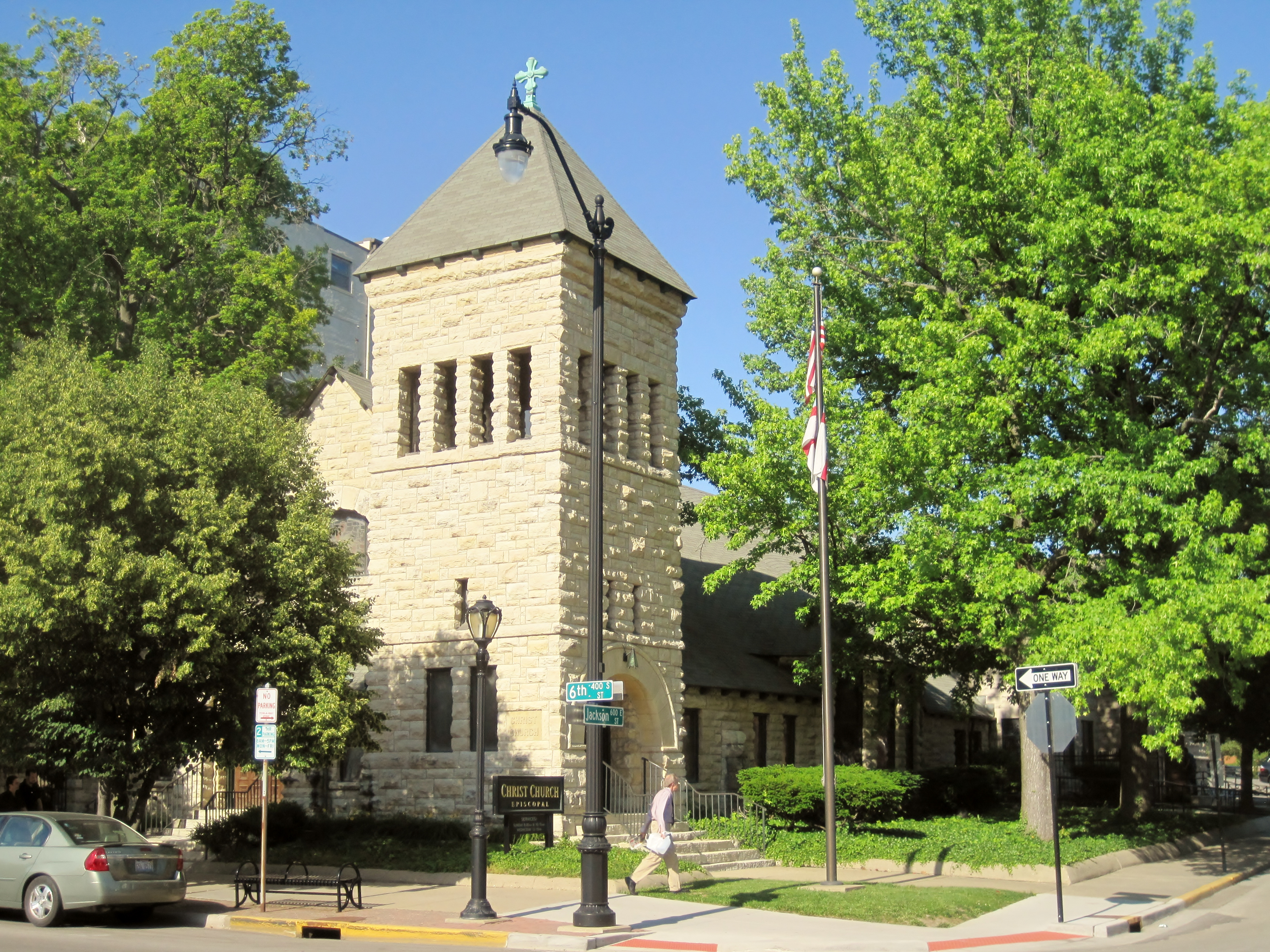

- Location within Illinois Location within the United States
- Location: 611 E. Jackson St., Springfield, Illinois
- Coordinates: 39°47′50″N 89°38′51″W
- Area: 0.3 acres (0.12 ha)
- Built: 1888
- Architect: Bullard & Bullard
- Architectural style: Richardsonian Romanesque
- NRHP reference No.: 80001410
- Added to NRHP: September 12, 1980

Christ Episcopal Church is an Episcopal church located in Springfield, Illinois. The Richardsonian Romanesque church is built in rusticated stone and features stained glass windows and a rounded chancel; the Illinois State Register described it as "one of the most beautiful churches ever built in Springfield". The church was built in 1888 and partly sponsored by businessmen George H. Webster and Charles Ridgely, who stipulated in their donation that the church must always conduct a low church service; the church is now the only low church in the Episcopal Diocese of Springfield. A parish house was added to the church in 1914, and a Sunday school building was added in 1950.

The church was added to the National Register of Historic Places on September 12, 1980.
