= University of Illinois Springfield =

Public university in Springfield, Illinois, US

- Former names: Sangamon State University (1969–1995); University of Illinois at Springfield (1995–2021)
- Type: Public university
- Established: 1969; 57 years ago
- Parent institution: University of Illinois System
- Accreditation: HLC
- Chancellor: Janet L. Gooch
- President: Timothy L. Killeen
- Academic staff: 533
- Students: 4,364 (fall 2025)
- Undergraduates: 2,337 (fall 2025)
- Postgraduates: 2,027 (fall 2025)
- Location: Springfield, Illinois, United States; 39°43′44″N 89°37′04″W
- Campus: 740 acres (300 ha); Midsize city
- Other campuses: East Peoria
- Newspaper: The Observer
- Colors: Deep navy and white
- Nickname: Prairie Stars
- Sporting affiliations: NCAA Division II – GLVC
- Mascot: Orion
- Website: uis.edu
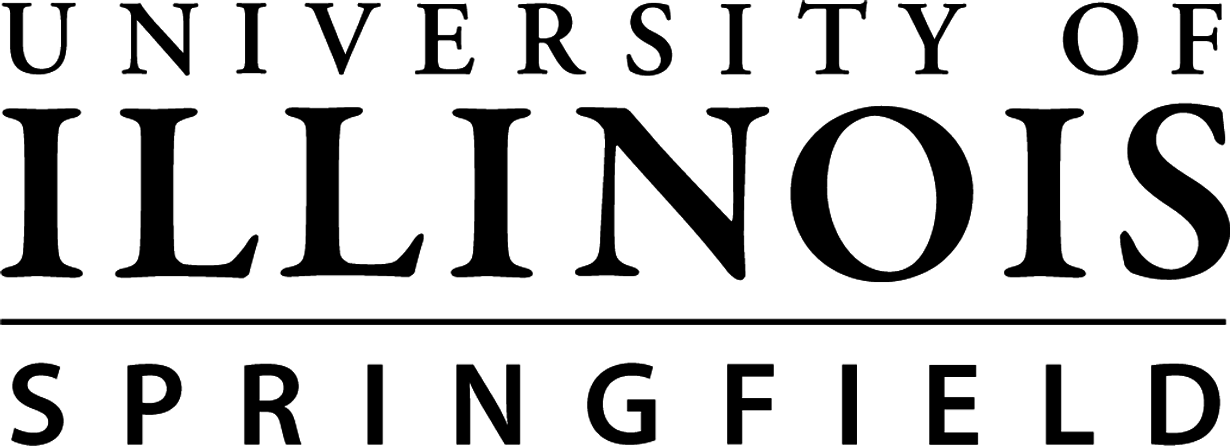

The University of Illinois Springfield (UIS) is a public university in Springfield, Illinois, United States. The university was established by the Illinois General Assembly in 1969 as Sangamon State University. It became the third member of the University of Illinois System on July 1, 1995. The university served 4,364 students as of fall 2025 with 49 bachelor's degree programs, 51 master's degree programs, 1 doctoral degree program, 47 graduate certificates, and coursework that leads to six ISBE endorsements.

== History ==
=== Sangamon State University (1967–1995) ===
In 1967, the Illinois General Assembly created a Board of Regents to operate Illinois State University and Northern Illinois University, as well as a third unnamed institution in Springfield. In 1969, Governor Richard Ogilvie signed into law a bill officially creating Sangamon State University. It originally operated as an "upper-division" university—that is, a university that offers only the last two years of undergraduate education, as well as graduate work. The first classes were held on September 28, 1970, at the former Hotel Leland in downtown Springfield. In October, SSU began offering classes in the current campus location near Lake Springfield.

Sangamon State aimed to be a "truly pioneering segment of public education" through a spirit of openness, innovation and adaptability.

The school grew steadily over the years. Its first permanent building, Brookens Library, was dedicated in 1976, and its Public Affairs Center and first dormitories opened in 1980.

=== University of Illinois Springfield (1995–present) ===
In 1995, Governor Jim Edgar signed a bill which abolished the Board of Regents and merged SSU with the University of Illinois System. On July 1, SSU officially became the University of Illinois Springfield. Naomi Lynn, the last president of SSU, became the first chancellor of UIS.

In 2001, it admitted freshmen for the first time in an honors program called the "Capital Scholars". On September 8, 2005, the University of Illinois Board of Trustees approved a new general education curriculum, making UIS a full-fledged four-year university for the first time. Freshmen were slated to be admitted under the general education curriculum beginning in fall 2006.

== Campus ==
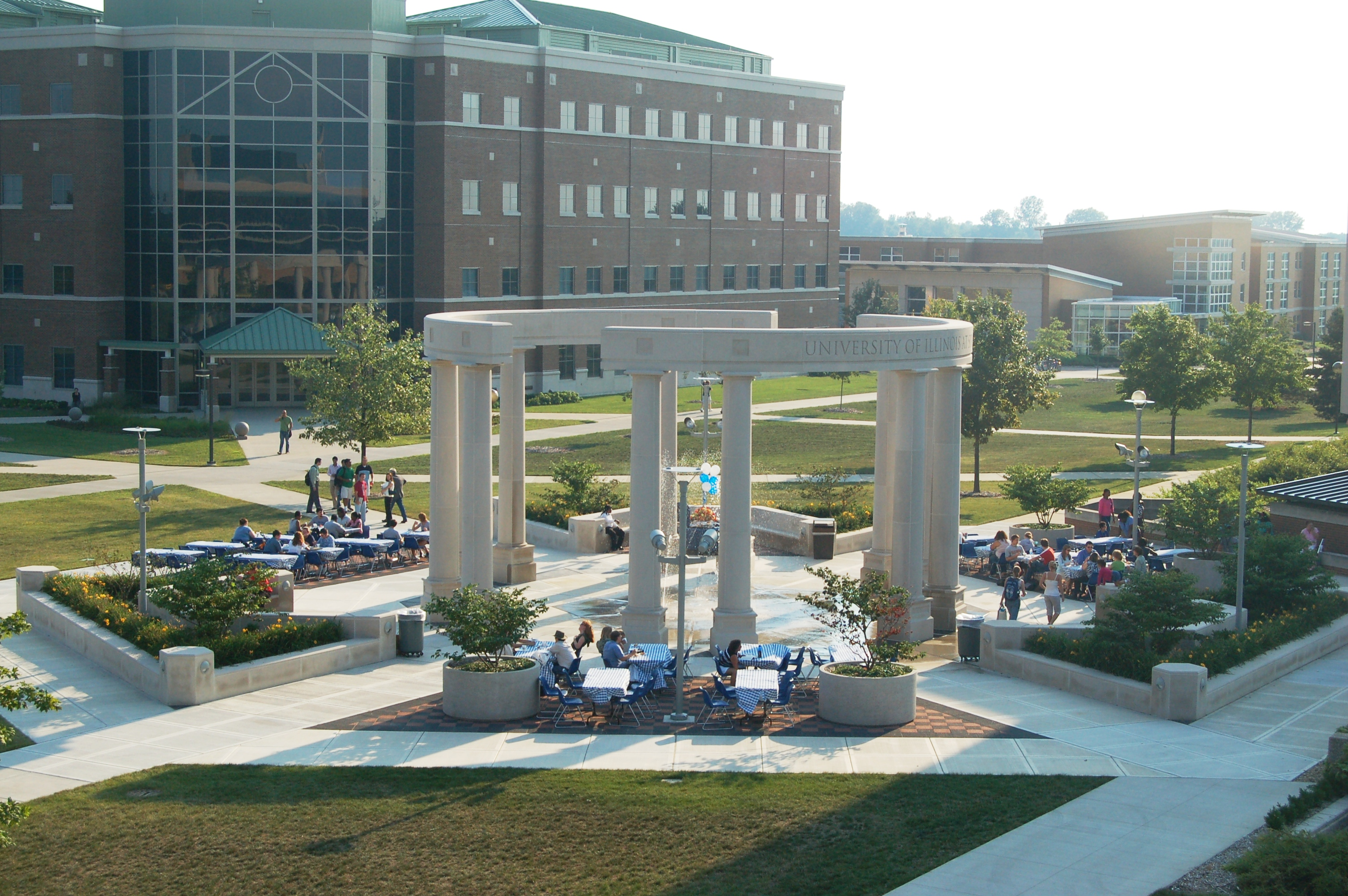
The Colonnade

The University of Illinois Springfield is located six miles southeast of downtown Springfield, occupying 740 acres of prairie land adjacent to Lake Springfield and Lincoln Land Community College. In 1841, the land was acquired by Thomas Strawbridge Jr., a prosperous saddler and harness maker in Springfield. The Thomas Strawbridge homestead, constructed around 1845, still stands on the south edge of the University of Illinois Springfield campus and was restored in 2012.

Today, there are three easily identifiable areas on campus: Legacy Campus, SSU Permanent Construction, and the University of Illinois era. The first permanent construction on campus, Brookens Library was completed in 1976 and the Public Affairs Center, was completed in Fall of 1980. These buildings were the first part of a master plan of 1970–1971 that called for an "urban campus" surrounded by restored prairie land, free of all vehicular traffic and easily navigable by pedestrians. All permanent campus buildings would be located within a "ring road", now known as University Drive. The Public Affairs Center also houses Sangamon Auditorium, a 2,018 seat concert hall and performing arts center built in 1981. It occupies the entire second level of the Public Affairs Center.

=== Legacy Campus ===
The Legacy Campus hosts an array of student services and facilities buildings. There is also the Cox Children's Center which was established in 1970. Some of the key buildings on this part of campus are the WUIS building, Student Life Building (SLB), Business Services Building (BSB), Human Resources Building (HRB), Student Affairs Building (SAB), and the Visual & Performing Arts Building (VPA).

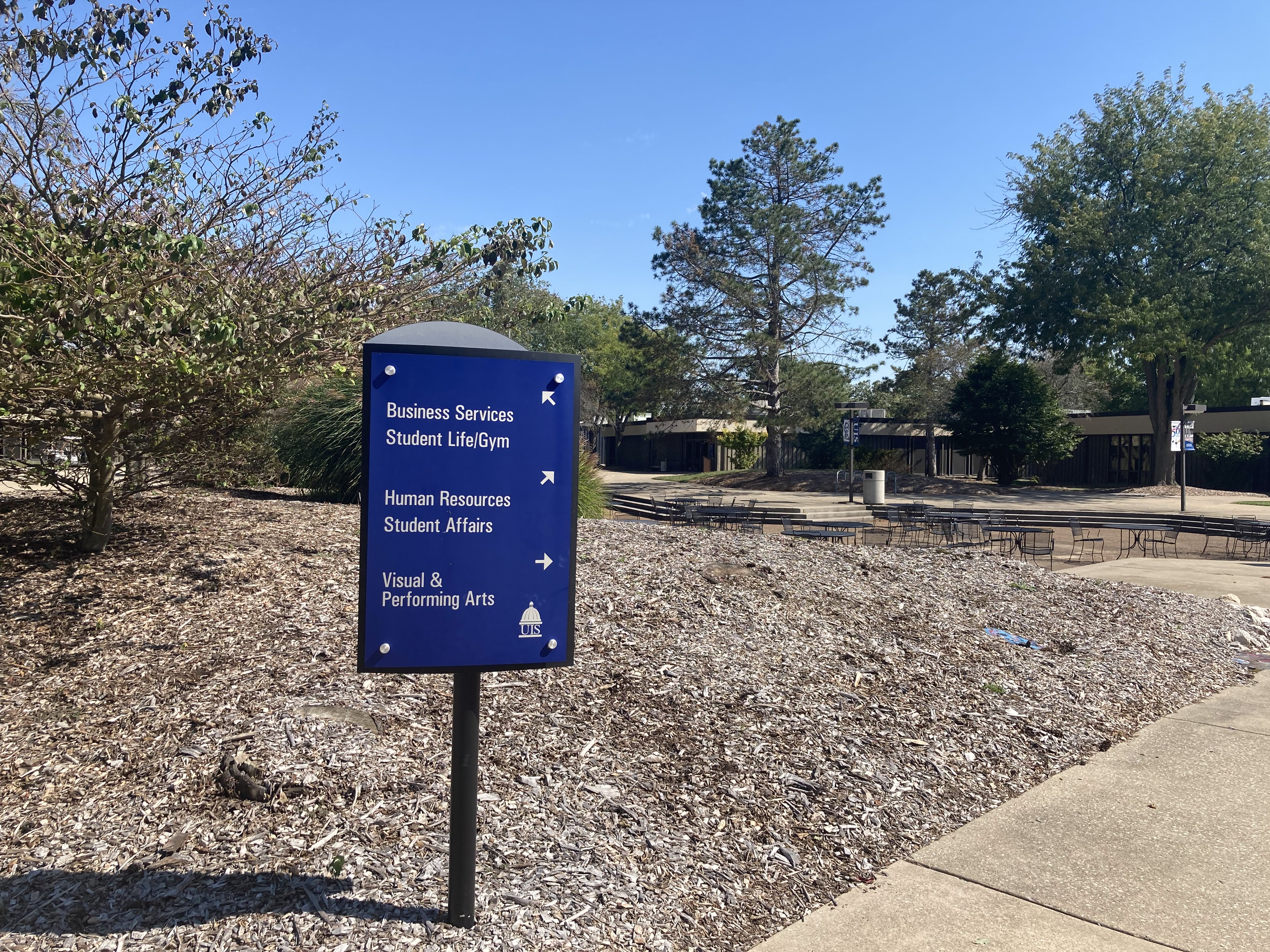
Legacy Campus

=== Residence life ===
UIS offers four living options for more than 1,100 students. On the East Campus there are four courts of apartments, one being designated for family housing including Sunflower, Larkspur, CLover, and Bluebell Courts. There is also the housing office at Homer L. Butler Commons (HCOM). On West Campus there are 96 townhouses encompassed within Pennyroyal, Marigold, Trillium and Foxglove court. For first and second year students there are two residence halls, Lincoln Residence Hall (LRH) and Founders Residence Hall (FRH).

== Academics ==
The University of Illinois Springfield has been offering online courses and degrees since 1999. Currently UIS offers 49 bachelor's degrees, 54 minors, 51 master's degree, one doctoral degree, 47 graduate certificates and coursework that leads to six ISBE endorsements.

=== Colleges ===
- College of Business and Management
- College of Health, Science, and Technology
- College of Liberal Arts & Social Sciences
- College of Public Affairs & Education

== Student life ==
=== Student newspaper ===
The UIS Observer is the student online news publication.

=== Greek organizations ===
- Alpha Phi Alpha
- Beta Gamma Sigma
- Delta Kappa Epsilon
- Phi Beta Sigma
- Phi Kappa Tau
- Sigma Lambda Beta

==== Sororities ====
- Alpha Kappa Alpha
- Delta Sigma Theta
- Gamma Phi Omega
- Zeta Phi Beta

== Athletics ==
Current athletics logo

The Illinois–Springfield (UIS) athletic teams are called the Prairie Stars. The university is a member of the Division II level of the National Collegiate Athletic Association (NCAA), primarily competing in the Great Lakes Valley Conference (GLVC) since the 2009–10 academic year, which they became a full-fledged Division II member on August 1, 2010. The Prairie Stars previously competed in the American Midwest Conference (AMC) of the National Association of Intercollegiate Athletics (NAIA) from 2003–04 to 2008–09.

UIS competes in 15 intercollegiate varsity sports: Men's sports include baseball, basketball, cross country, golf, soccer, tennis and track & field (indoor and outdoor); while women's sports include basketball, cross country, golf, soccer, softball, tennis, track & field (indoor and outdoor) and volleyball.

== Notable alumni and faculty ==
=== Alumni ===
- Cheri Bustos, former U.S. representative, Illinois's 17th district (M.A. Public Affairs Reporting)
- Mike Cernovich, right-wing social media personality and host of The Alex Jones Show on InfoWars (2001 B.A. Philosophy)
- Ward Churchill, former University of Colorado professor, social critic, activist (1974 B.A. Communications, 1975 M.A. Communications)
- Vince Demuzio, Illinois state senator, 1975–2004 (1981 B.A. in Education and Human Services; 1996 M.A. in Education and Public Policy)
- Karen A. Hasara, former mayor of Springfield, Illinois, Illinois state senator, (1972 B.A. Psychology, 1992 M.A. Legal Studies)
- Kyle Gupton, basketball player
- Gordon S. Heddell, former United States Department of Defense inspector general (1975 M.A. Legal Studies)
- Jim Langfelder, former mayor of Springfield, Illinois
- Al Lewis, columnist, Dow Jones Newswires
- Kimberly Lightford, current member, Illinois State Senate
- Bobby McFerrin, vocal performer and conductor (attended 1975, did not complete degree)
- Milton J. Nieuwsma, author, Emmy-winning filmwriter-producer (1978 M.A.)
- Richard Oruche, shooting guard on the Nigerian national basketball team (2010 B.A. Business Administration)
- Richard Osborne, former CEO of Scotsman Industries
- Dana Perino, White House Press Secretary for the George W. Bush administration (1995 M.A. Public Affairs Reporting)
- Elgie Sims, current member, Illinois Senate
- Russell Smith, movie producer
- Thom Serafin, communications consultant

=== Faculty ===
- Michael Burlingame, historian
- John Knoepfle, poet and translator
- Phillip S. Paludan, historian
- Paul Simon, political scientist
