= Lincoln Land Community College =

Public college in Springfield, Illinois, US

Coordinates: 39°43′17″N 89°36′40″W

- Type: Public community college
- Established: 1967
- President: Charlotte J. Warren
- Students: 4,444 (Fall 2022)
- Location: Springfield, Illinois, U.S.
- Colors: Blue and red
- Sporting affiliations: NJCAA; Mid-West Athletic Conference
- Mascot: Loggers
- Website: www.llcc.edu

Lincoln Land Community College is a public community college in Springfield, Illinois. It has extended branches in different locations, including Beardstown, Jacksonville, Litchfield and Taylorville, Illinois. The main campus is less than half a mile from the University of Illinois Springfield.

== Athletics ==
The Lincoln Land Loggers are composed of 7 athletic teams representing Lincoln Land Community College in intercollegiate athletics, including baseball, men's and women's basketball, women's soccer, softball, and women's volleyball. The Loggers compete in the National Junior College Athletic Association.

The Loggers baseball team plays at Claude Kracik Baseball Field, the basketball teams and volleyball team play at Cass Gymnasium, the soccer team plays at the Lincoln Land Soccer Field, and the softball team plays at the Lincoln Land Softball Field.

=== National Championships ===
Lincoln Land has won two NJCAA national titles.

- Baseball (1): 1994, 2000

== Transportation ==
The main campus of Lincoln Land Community College is accessible via Sangamon Mass Transit District. Routes 11 and 905 provide bus service from campus to the University of Illinois Springfield and to downtown Springfield.

== Notable alumni ==
- Justin Allgaier, NASCAR driver for JR Motorsports
- Richard G. Austin, politician and former Adjutant General of the State of Illinois
- Nick Maton, Professional Baseball Player
- Kathleen Vinehout, Wisconsin State Senator
- Tim Wilkerson, NHRA Funny Car driver
