= Karen Hasara =

American politician

Mayor of Springfield, Illinois
- In office April 1995 – April 2003
- Preceded by: Ossie Langfelder
- Succeeded by: Timothy Davlin

Personal details
- Born: July 1, 1940 (age 86) Chicago, Illinois
- Party: Republican
- Education: University of Illinois

Karen Hasara is a Republican member of the University of Illinois Board of Trustees and a past member of the Illinois General Assembly (1986-1995) as well as the Mayor of Springfield, Illinois for two terms from 1995-2003.

== Early life ==
After graduating from the University of Illinois at Springfield with a bachelor's degree in psychology and elementary education, Hasara was a teacher at Christ The King Elementary School for two years before she began her government career by being elected to the Sangamon County Board in 1975. While on the Sangamon County Board she became a broker manager and salesperson at K & L Real Estate and Director of the National Academy of Real Estate. In 1980, she was elected Sangamon County Circuit Clerk, the administrative arm of the Sangamon County court system where she succeeded Edward W. Ryan. After six years, she was succeeded as Circuit Clerk by Candice Trees.

== Illinois General Assembly ==
In 1986, Hasara was elected to the Illinois House of Representatives, where she served the 100th District. While serving in the Illinois House of Representatives, Hasara earned an M.A. in legal studies. In 1992, she was elected to the Illinois Senate to represent the newly drawn 50th district which included Sangamon and Menard counties as well as the eastern half of Cass County.

== Mayor of Springfield ==
In 1995, Hasara won a highly contested election, to become the first female mayor of Springfield, Illinois. She was re-elected in 1999 and served until her term ended in 2003. As mayor, she made two trips to Ukraine, and Springfield became one of the partners of the U.S. Ukraine Foundation. Mayor Hasara was also greatly involved in Sister Cities International, and under her leadership, Springfield gained two additional sister cities (in Mexico and Ireland).

== Post political career ==
Hasara currently serves on the Board of Directors for the U.S. Center for Citizen Diplomacy. Since leaving elected office, she has worked in Russia and several Eastern European countries, in the fields of tourism and economic development. As part of the Women in Government program, she has trained women in these nations in areas such a being candidates for office, constituent services, and other matters.

Hasara has also served on the boards of the World Affairs Council and the Greater Springfield Chamber of Commerce, and is the Secretary of the Illinois Equal Justice Foundation, as well as a member of the Rotary Club and the Junior League of Springfield. In 2007, she was appointed Trustee of the Springfield Mass Transit District.

In 2007, Hasara endorsed Aaron Schock in the 2008 Republican primary for the U.S. House of Representatives in Illinois's 18th congressional district, and appeared both in mailers and a television ad for his campaign. During the 2014 Republican gubernatorial primary, she was speculated as a possible running mate for Kirk Dillard. Karen was appointed to Governor Pritzker's Special Committee on Administration, Reform, and Innovation.
