= Cook Memorial Library =

Cook Memorial Library may refer to:

- Cook Memorial Public Library District, northern Lake County, Illinois
- Cook Memorial Library (Libertyville, Illinois), listed on the National Register of Historic Places in Lake County, Illinois
- Cook Memorial Library (Davenport, Iowa), NRHP-nominated
- Cook Memorial Library (Tamworth, New Hampshire), listed on the National Register of Historic Places listings in Carroll County, New Hampshire

== See also ==
- Clarissa C. Cook Library/Blue Ribbon News Building, Davenport, Iowa, listed on the NRHP in Scott County, Iowa
