= Kevin Walter =

American football player (born 1981)

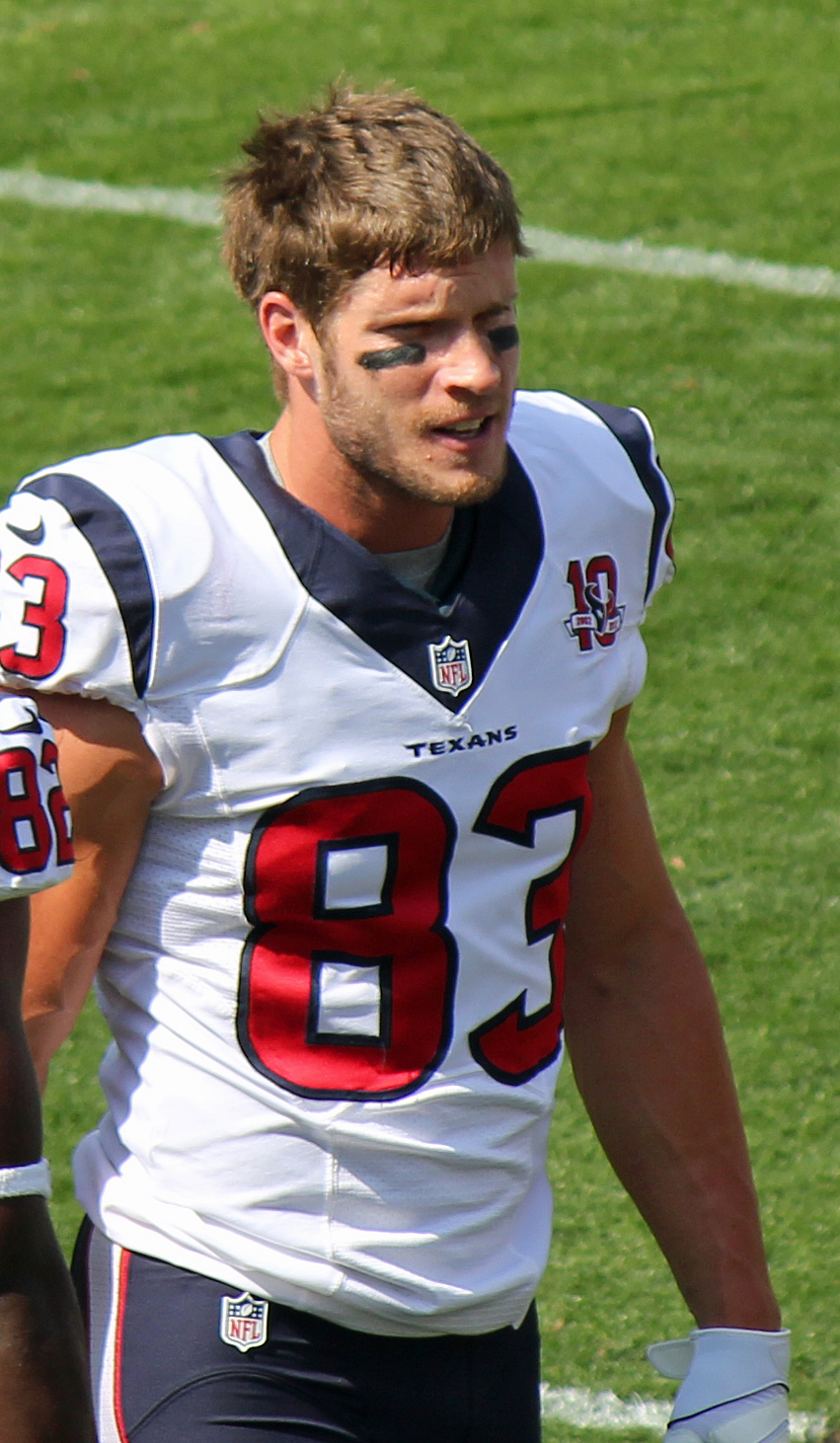
- Walter with the Houston Texans in 2012

No. 83, 85, 87
- Position: Wide receiver

Personal information
- Born: August 4, 1981 (age 45); Lake Forest, Illinois, U.S.
- Listed height: 6 ft 3 in (1.91 m)
- Listed weight: 218 lb (99 kg)

Career information
- High school: Libertyville (Libertyville, Illinois)
- College: Eastern Michigan (1999–2002)
- NFL draft: 2003: 7th round, 255th overall pick

Career history
- New York Giants (2003)*; Cincinnati Bengals (2003–2005); Houston Texans (2006–2012); Tennessee Titans (2013)
- * Offseason or practice squad member only

Awards and highlights
- First-team All-MAC (2002)

Career NFL statistics
- Receptions: 356
- Receiving yards: 4,379
- Receiving average: 12.3
- Receiving touchdowns: 25
- Stats at Pro Football Reference

Kevin Patrick Walter (born August 4, 1981) is an American former professional football player who was a wide receiver in the National Football League (NFL). He was selected by the New York Giants in the seventh round of the 2003 NFL draft. He played college football for the Eastern Michigan Eagles.

Walter was also a member of the Cincinnati Bengals, Houston Texans, and Tennessee Titans.

== Early life ==
Walter grew up in Vernon Hills, Illinois where he attended Hawthorn Middle School South, and played wide receiver for Libertyville High School in neighboring Libertyville, Illinois, a suburb 30 minutes north of Chicago. He lettered three times in football, earning first-team all-state honors as a wide receiver after catching 48 passes for 801 yards and 6 touchdowns. He helped the team to a 10–1 record and a berth in the second round of the state tournament. Walter also was selected first-team all-area, all-conference and All-Lake County. He caught 17 passes for 201 yards and two touchdowns as a junior.

== College career ==
Walter attended Eastern Michigan University, where he set school records for receptions (211), receiving yards (2,838), and touchdown catches (20). He also earned first-team All-MAC honors as a senior with 93 receptions for 1,368 receiving yards, which were both school single-season records.

== Professional career ==
=== New York Giants ===
Walter was a late seventh-round pick (255th overall) in the 2003 NFL draft by the New York Giants out of Eastern Michigan, but was released during training camp.

=== Cincinnati Bengals ===
After his release from the Giants, Walter signed with the Cincinnati Bengals. Walter spent three years mainly as a backup and special teams player, although he did see action in almost every game of his Bengals career and was actually a starter for a couple of games in 2005.

=== Houston Texans ===
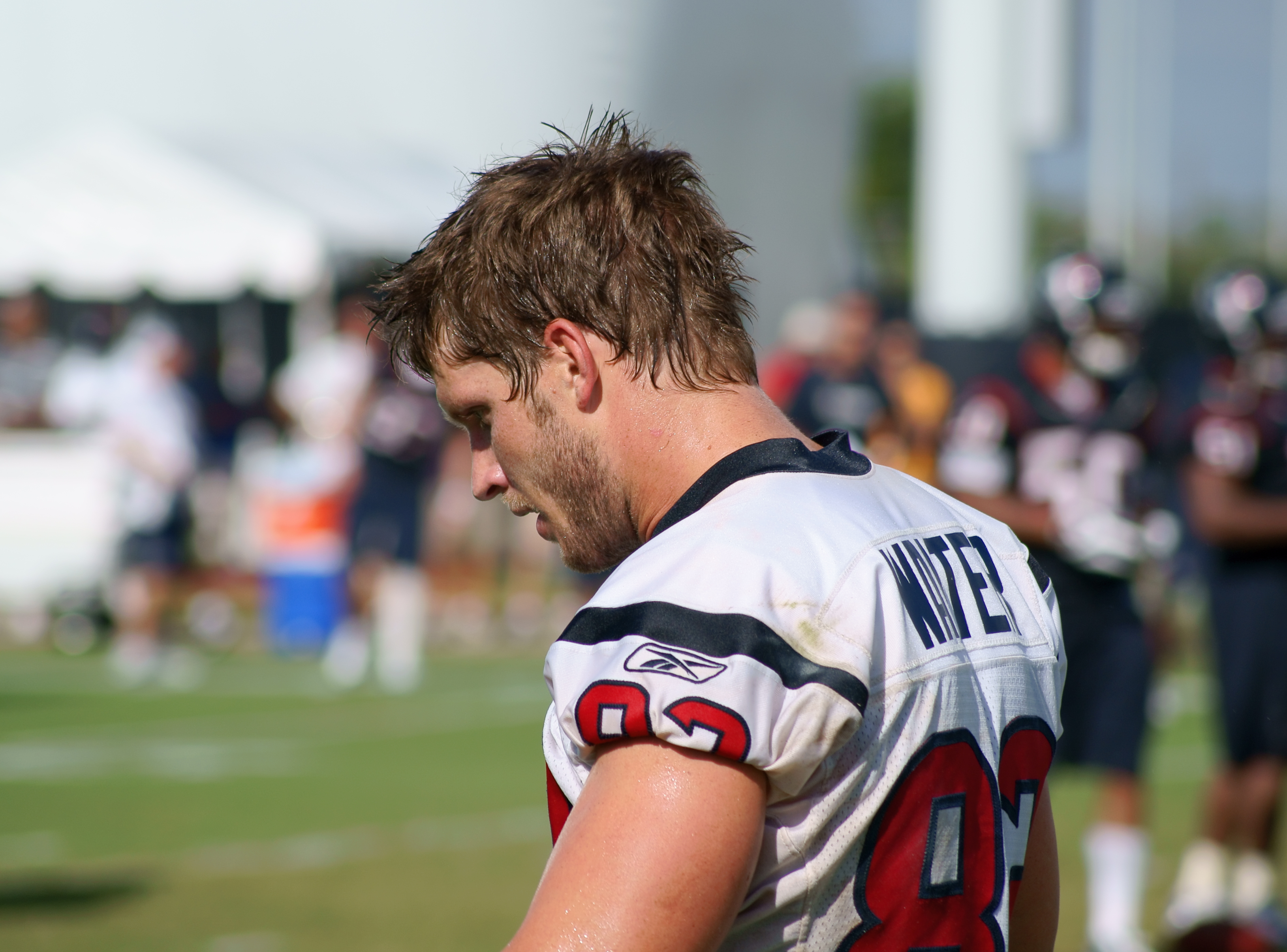
Walter with the Texans in 2010

The Houston Texans signed Walter to a restricted free agent tender in 2006, which the Bengals did not match. In return, the Texans gave up a seventh-round pick to the Bengals. After an injury to Pro-bowler Andre Johnson, Walter became the Texans number one receiver and after 8 games in 2007, Walter had 40 catches for 512 yards while also posting a career-high game at Jacksonville in week 6 with 12 catches for 160 yards. Walter's best season came in 2008, he had 60 receptions for 899 yards and 8 touchdowns. He was released by the Texans on March 12, 2013.

=== Tennessee Titans ===
On April 1, 2013, Walter signed with the Tennessee Titans. On August 27, the Titans placed Walter on the reserve/physically unable to perform list.

== NFL career statistics ==
Legend
| **Bold** | Career high |

=== Regular season ===
| Year | Team | Games | | Receiving | | | | | |
| Year | Team | GP | GS | Tgt | Rec | Yds | Avg | Lng | TD |
|---|---|---|---|---|---|---|---|---|---|
| 2003 | CIN | 11 | 0 | 4 | 3 | 18 | 6.0 | 9 | 0 |
| 2004 | CIN | **16** | 0 | 9 | 8 | 67 | 8.4 | 18 | 0 |
| 2005 | CIN | **16** | 2 | 29 | 19 | 211 | 11.1 | 33 | 1 |
| 2006 | HOU | **16** | 2 | 21 | 17 | 160 | 9.4 | 15 | 0 |
| 2007 | HOU | **16** | 15 | **106** | **65** | 800 | 12.3 | 46 | 4 |
| 2008 | HOU | **16** | **16** | 95 | 60 | **899** | **15.0** | **61** | **8** |
| 2009 | HOU | 14 | 14 | 70 | 53 | 611 | 11.5 | 41 | 2 |
| 2010 | HOU | **16** | **16** | 80 | 51 | 621 | 12.2 | 35 | 5 |
| 2011 | HOU | 15 | 14 | 59 | 39 | 474 | 12.2 | 41 | 3 |
| 2012 | HOU | **16** | 14 | 68 | 41 | 518 | 12.6 | 52 | 2 |
| Career | | 152 | 93 | 541 | 356 | 4,379 | 12.3 | 61 | 25 |

=== Playoffs ===
| Year | Team | Games | | Receiving | | | | | |
| Year | Team | GP | GS | Tgt | Rec | Yds | Avg | Lng | TD |
|---|---|---|---|---|---|---|---|---|---|
| 2005 | CIN | 1 | 0 | 8 | 5 | **73** | **14.6** | **24** | 0 |
| 2011 | HOU | **2** | **2** | **10** | 3 | 36 | 12.0 | 19 | 0 |
| 2012 | HOU | **2** | **2** | 7 | **6** | 41 | 6.8 | 12 | 0 |
| Career | | 5 | 4 | 25 | 14 | 150 | 10.7 | 24 | 0 |

== Personal life ==
He is married to college girlfriend Caroline, with whom he has one daughter and two sons.
