= Libertyville High School =

Public high school in Illinois, United States

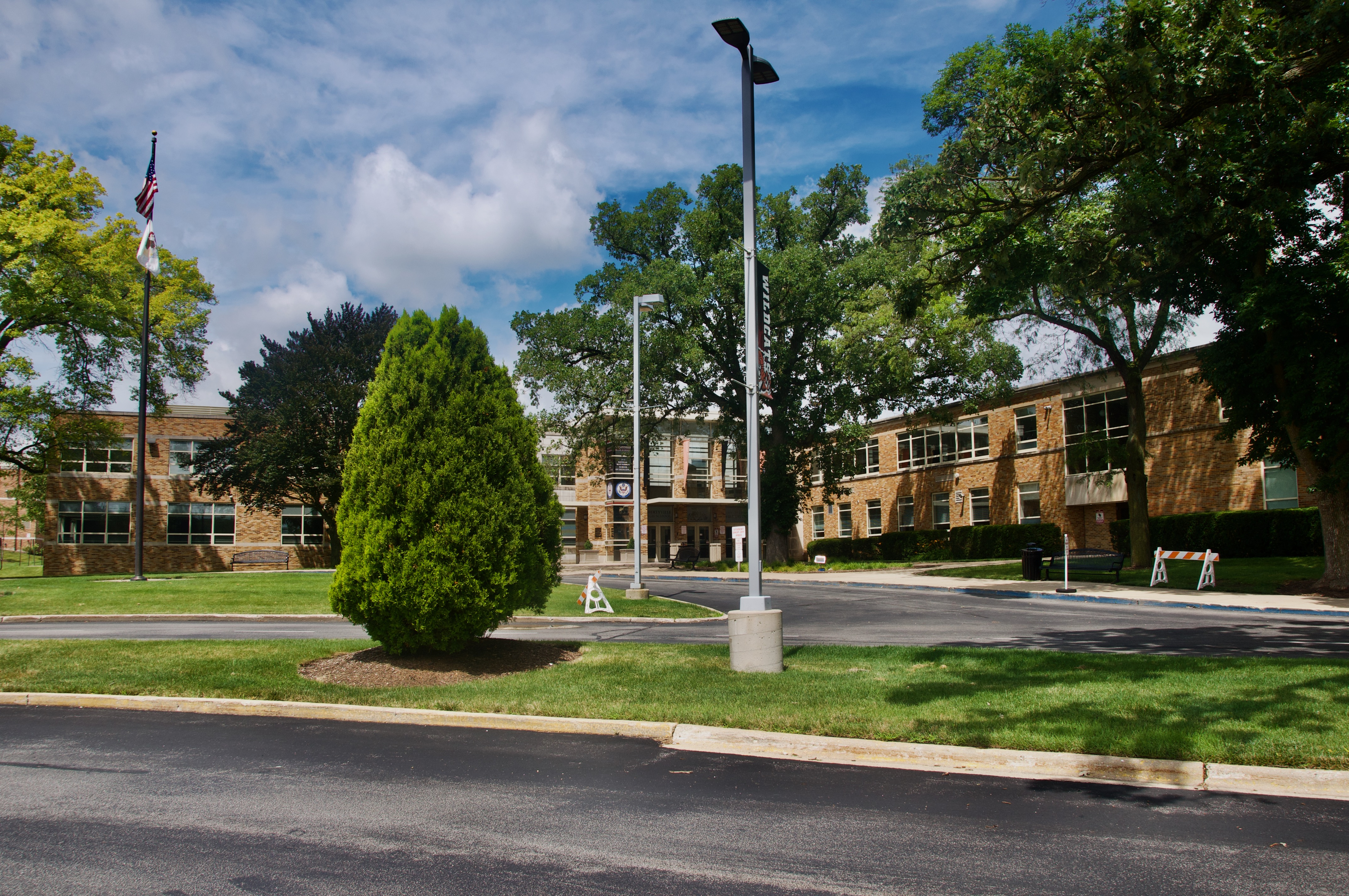

Location
- 708 W. Park Ave. Libertyville, Illinois 60048; United States; 42.284778°N 87.96602°W

Information
- School type: public secondary
- Opened: 1917
- School district: Community High School District 128
- Superintendent: Raymond Lechner (Interim); Rebecca Nelson (Interim)
- Principal: Ray Albin
- Teaching staff: 130.83 (on an FTE basis)
- Grades: 9–12
- Gender: coed
- Enrollment: 1,805 (2023–2024)
- Average class size: 20.5
- Student to teacher ratio: 13.80
- Campus: suburban
- Colours: orange Black
- Slogan: "Excellence is our standard"
- Fight song: Loyal and True
- Athletics conference: North Suburban Conference
- Mascot: Willy the Wildcat
- Nickname: Wildcats
- Team name: Libertyville
- Publication: Slant of Light
- Newspaper: Drops of Ink
- Yearbook: Nautilus
- Website: www.lhswildcats.org

Libertyville High School, or LHS, is a public four-year high school located in Libertyville, Illinois, a northern suburb of Chicago, Illinois. Its campus is located on Butler Lake, at the intersection of Park Avenue (IL Rte 176) and Dawes Street. Together with Vernon Hills High School, it is part of Community High School District 128.

== History ==
- Libertyville High School Brainerd Building
- U.S. National Register of Historic Places
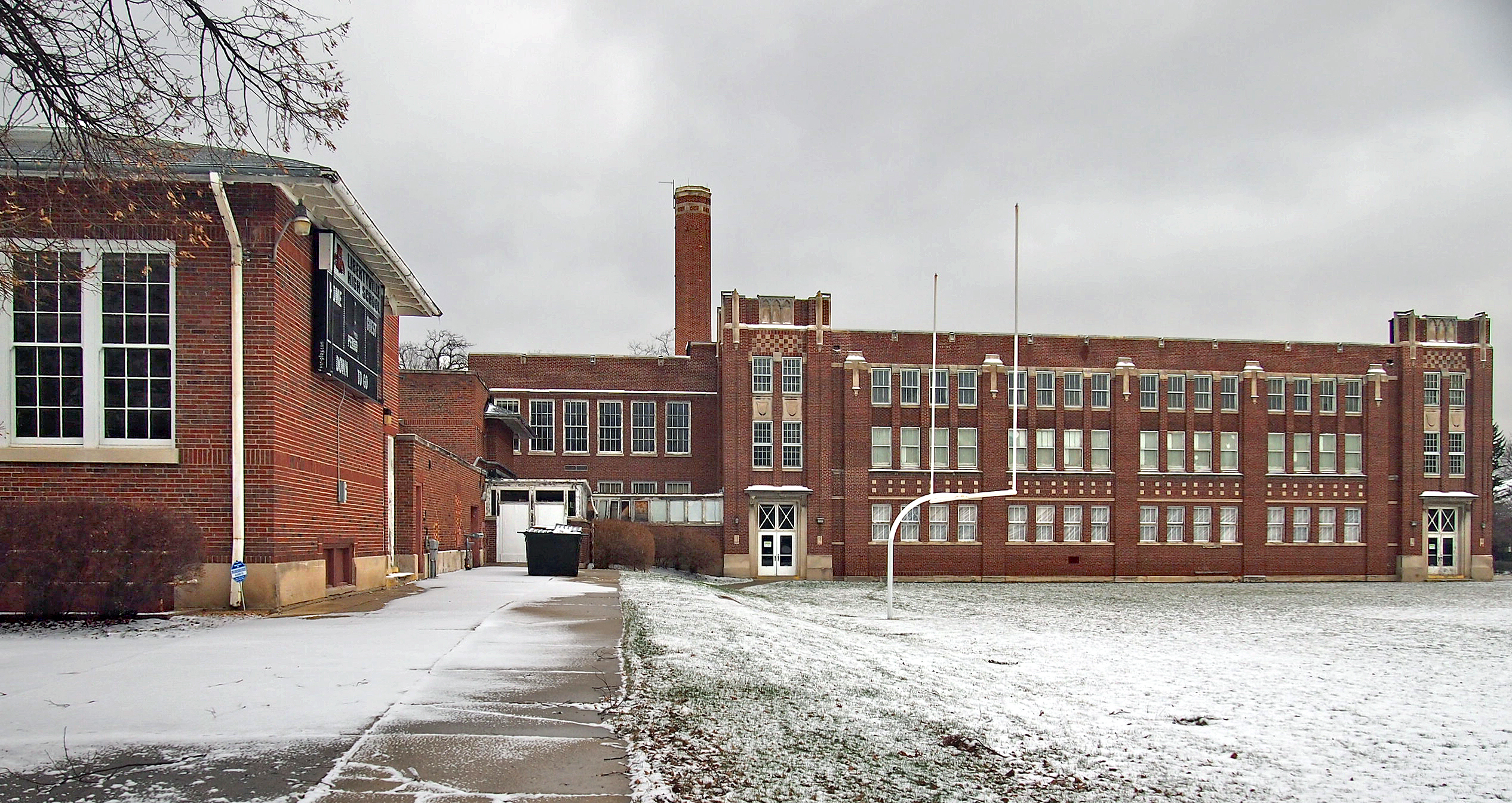
- The Brainerd Building, since demolished, was listed on the National Register of Historic Places.

- Location within Illinois
- Location: 416 W. Park Ave., Libertyville, Illinois
- Coordinates: 42°17′08″N 87°57′29″W
- Area: 4.7 acres (1.9 ha)
- Built: 1916
- Architect: Wilson, Horatio R.; Scribbins, John A.
- Architectural style: Gothic Revival, Collegiate Gothic
- NRHP reference No.: 08000678
- Added to NRHP: July 16, 2008

The school was founded as Libertyville Township High School in 1917. When it first opened there were 138 students from Libertyville and the surrounding towns, and seven teachers. The original building (the Brainerd Building, pictured below) was located at the corner of Brainerd and West Park Avenues. In July 2008, the Brainerd Building was named to the National Register of Historic Places for its role as the first four-year high school building in Central Lake County, and its over 80 subsequent years of continued use. With the opening of the Butler Lake Campus in 1956, the Brainerd Building served as the school's Freshman campus, requiring students to commute about a quarter mile by foot between the two campuses. With the growth in the student body from communities surrounding Libertyville, the school became known formally as "Libertyville Community High School" until the opening of Vernon Hills High School in 1999. With the opening of Vernon Hills High School, the Brainerd Building was phased out as the Freshman campus, and the entire student body was eventually consolidated at Butler Lake. Plans to rehabilitate it for community use were unsuccessful and, to make way for athletic fields, demolition of the building began December 2014. In 2003, Libertyville High School began a $9 million expansion project at the Butler Lake campus to add new offices, classrooms and an expansion of the school's music department.

In the film Public Enemies, footage of the school's science lab, an office, the school's front entrance, and the locker rooms was filmed during spring break of March. The 2001 film New Port South was also filmed at Libertyville High School. Portions of the 2009 horror film The Unborn was filmed in the high school's locker rooms.

== Feeder schools ==
LHS draws students from several feeder schools in the area, the majority of which matriculate from Highland Middle School in Libertyville. Other school districts supplying students to LHS include the Vernon Hills-based Hawthorn School District 73, Oak Grove School District 68 in neighboring Green Oaks, Rondout School District 72 serving unincorporated Lake Forest, and St. Joseph Catholic School in Libertyville.

== Academics ==
In 2013, according to the Chicago Tribune Illinois School Report Card, students’ average composite ACT score was 26, which is above the Illinois state average of 20.3. Also, in 2013, 84% of LHS students met the Prairie State Achievement Examination standards. This is up 0.9% from 2012. The Prairie State Achievement Examination, or PSAE is a two-day exam which all juniors take. It includes the ACT college exam and the ACT Work Keys, which is a math and reading exam measuring real-world skills. In 2010 the Chicago Tribune Illinois School Report Card ranked Libertyville High School the ninth best public high school in Illinois, based on its average composite ACT score of 25.3. 98.0% of seniors were graduated in 2010 LHS has also been consistently recognized by Newsweek magazine in their annual "America's Best High Schools" list. Libertyville High School was ranked as number 23rd in the nation by Niche, for their "2017 Best Public High Schools in America."

== Extracurricular activities ==
The scholastic bowl team twice finished in the top four at the IHSA State Championship Tournament: achieving third place in 1997 and fourth place in 2007.

=== Music ===
The LHS Wind Ensemble has performed at several national and international music conferences. In 1998 and 2004, the Wind Ensemble performed at the prestigious Midwest International Band and Orchestra Clinic. The Wind Ensemble was also one of sixteen bands in the entire country selected to participate in the Bands of America National Concert Band Festival in Indianapolis in 2001, 2007, 2009, and 2013, and its percussion ensemble was selected to participate in 2013. In 2007 the Wind Ensemble earned the recognition of National Wind Band Honors in the highest class, AAAAA.

The Libertyville Wind Ensemble has been named the Class AAA Honor Band at the University of Illinois Superstate Festival every year it has been eligible from 1996 to 2004, and was again named the Honor Band in 2007. In 2009, both the Libertyville High School and Vernon Hills High School Wind Ensembles were named Honor Band at the Superstate Festival, marking the first time that both Wind Ensembles in District 128 took the top honor in the same year. In 2011, Libertyville High School again won the top division of the Superstate Competition with its performance of "Cityscape," a piece premiered in the Krannert Center where the concert was performed, as well as Richard Strauss's transcription of "Don Juan." Because of their 20-year winning streak at Illinois Superstate, the Wind Ensemble is considered one of the top high school bands in the country. Libertyville will once again perform as a Class AAA Honor Band at the SuperState Contest in 2018.

The school's jazz band has also won many awards, and performed at the National Band Association Convention in 1992, as well as the Midwest Clinic in 1982 and 1993. In 2009, Jazz Ensemble I was named Best Band of the Day among all Class AA schools participating in the North Shore Jazz Festival, one of the state's largest jazz festivals.

There are currently three Libertyville orchestras, including the Symphony Orchestra, which is consistently one of the top high school orchestras in Illinois. The orchestra performed at the international Midwest Clinic in 1991, 1996, and 2004. The orchestra has also performed on numerous overseas tours, including performances in China, Italy, and Austria, among others.

=== Athletics ===
Libertyville competes in the North Suburban Conference. Libertyville is also a member of the Illinois High School Association (IHSA), which sponsors State Championship Tournaments in most sports. Its mascot is the Wildcat. In 2005 Libertyville put in a modern FieldTurf field, along with new speakers.

The school sponsors interscholastic sports teams for boys and girls in basketball, bowling, cross country, golf, gymnastics, soccer, swimming & diving, tennis, track & field, volleyball, and water polo. Boys may compete in baseball, football, and wrestling. Girls may compete in cheerleading and softball. While not sponsored by the IHSA, the school also sponsors teams for men and women in lacrosse, as well as teams for women in poms.

The football team won the IHSA state championship in 2004. In October 2010, the LHS varsity team became the third squad in the country to wear pink jerseys to raise breast cancer awareness. The team's head coach, Randy Kuceyeski stated, "They [the team] understand that the color of our jerseys will not affect the outcome of the game. They also understand that by raising funds and awareness, that might in fact change the outcome of someone's life, which is a lot more important."

The girls' soccer team has won two IHSA state titles (1991, 2001). The boys' soccer team has won one IHSA state title (2015).

== Notable alumni ==
- Marlon Brando
- Grant Breckenridge, American gymnast and coach
- Steven Brooks, lacrosse player
- Brett Butler, MLB player
- Julia Cameron, writer
- Bill Heck, actor
- Maureen Herman, bass player
- Marshall Hollingsworth, soccer player
- Baggio Husidic, soccer player
- Adam Jones, guitarist
- Ashraf Khalil, journalist
- Jim McMillen, NFL player
- Tom Morello, guitarist
- Jim Naureckas, magazine editor
- Zak Orth, film actor
- Jim Panther, MLB pitcher (1971–73).
- Drew Peterson, NBA player
- Gwynne Shotwell, President and chief operating officer of SpaceX
- Phillipa Soo, actress
- Evan Skoug, baseball player
- Kevin Walter, NFL player
- Laura Zeng, rhythmic gymnast, Olympian
