= X-tal =

American rock band

X-tal was an American, San Francisco-based rock band, that existed under various incarnations from 1983 until 1996. Greil Marcus of the Village Voice described them as a "small-time San Francisco combo that wears their defeated leftist politics on their sleeves and can open for the Mekons without letting you forget them when the headliners come on."

== History ==
The original line-up included frontman J. Neo (Marvin), bassist Alan Korn (formerly of SF's The Cat Heads) and drummer Michael "Mick" Freeman. Neo offers this explanation of the band's name: "Still no agreement on a band name until Maati [Stojanovich, Neo's girlfriend] sees a graffiti on a sidewalk in the Tenderloin reading 'XTAL.' No one hates it; it grows on you. Somewhere along the line a hyphen is added to make it easier to pronounce, but for the next 13 years, confusion ensues as to whether the letter 't' is capitalized. (It's not.)"

The trio's first two gigs were at San Francisco's On Broadway in late 1983. The band put out a demo in 1984, then broke up in 1985, with band members moving on to other projects.

When two songs from X-tal's demo were included on the 1987 SF Unscene compilation and attracted some attention, Neo and Freeman reformed the band, eventually settling on a lineup with Mitzi Waltz on bass and Jimmy (Demetrius) Broustis on guitar. (Broustis hails from Libertyville, Illinois, a small town that produced a number of alternative music figures; Broustis was in the same class at Libertyville High School as Adam Jones of Tool.)

This lineup played frequently at San Francisco's Albion, and released X-tal's first album, Reason Is 6/7 of Treason, in 1990. The CMJ New Music Report said the record "scoops up the morning-dew innocence of the least embarrassing Haight-Ashbury petal-babies of the `60s with the world-bleary wisdom of all those SF/LA punk-worn people who turned their matured underground gaze upon gentler, more introspective directions."

With Allison Moseley replacing Waltz on bass, X-tal recorded Die Monster Die, released in 1991. This second album was called "wiser and angrier" by CMJ, which deemed it "first-class world punk music." The disc's more political songs included "An Old Colonial's Hard Luck Story" (the band's only single), about the self-pity of Rhodesian exiles, and "Domino's Theory," a six-minute protest song tying together Domino's Pizza's labor policies and food quality to CEO Tom Monaghan's alleged support for the Nicaraguan Contras and Operation Rescue:

A fortune made on cardboard crust
Is a gun pointed at our subversive lust
And a Midwest multi-millionaire
Can finance right-wing guerrilla warfare
Anywhere

The same band members, with guest Carrie Bradley of Ed's Redeeming Qualities, produced 1992's Everything Crash, which AllMusic called "an excellent album that makes the brain dance." The Voice's Marcus cited the Fairport Convention cover "Genesis Hall" (featuring Moseley on vocals) and "Neo's despair-hate-grief-and-rage cocktail 'Black Russian'" as "much better than good."

After this release, Broustis left the group, eventually replaced by Mark Zanandrea. The two albums recorded with Zanandrea were released in Germany, where the band had a considerable following. In 1996, the last incarnation of X-tal broke up. In 2006, they played a well-attended reunion concert in San Francisco.

== Associated bands ==
There was a proto-version of X-tal that went by various names, including PDR, that included Neo and Alan Korn, along with Annie Hesse or Maati Stojanovich and a series of drummers. Neo considers the first real X-tal lineup to be the one with Mick Freeman.

When the first lineup of X-tal broke up, Korn formed a band called The Cat Heads with singer/guitarist Mark Zanandrea, who played guitar in the latter days of X-tal. Zanandrea had released the above-mentioned SF Unscene compilation. The Catheads also included guitarist Sam Babbitt and drummer-singer Melanie Clarin.

Between the first and second incarnations of X-tal, a band called God and His Dog (described by Neo as having "the impossible ambition to be a cross between the Pogues and Sonic Youth") was formed by Neo, Freeman, Stojanovich, Patty Stirling, and Jeremy O'Doughaill (formerly of the band Honor Role). Several songs written for God and His Dog ended up on X-tal and Cat Heads albums.

Jeremy O'Doughaill went on to be in a band called the Bedlam Rovers with two future members of X-tal's final lineup: drummer Theo Denaxas and violinist/accordionist Morgan Fichter.

After leaving X-tal, Broustis played with the bands Strawman and Shotwell.

Neo's post-X-tal vehicles are J Neo Marvin and the Content Providers, the Experimental Bunnies, and the Granite Countertops.

Mitzi Waltz was a lecturer on autism at the University of Birmingham (England).

== Discography ==
=== Albums ===
- Reason Is 6/7 Of Treason, 1990
- Die Monster Die , 1991
- Everything Crash, 1992
- Mayday, 1994
- Biting The Ugly Biscuit (compilation), 1996
- The Conqueror Worm, 1996
- Who Owns Our Dreams (collection of the best of Mayday and The Conqueror Worm), 2006

=== EPs ===
- Humboldt Desert, 1991
- Good Luck, 1993

=== Singles ===
- "An Old Colonial's Hard Luck Story", 1990
