= Cook Memorial Library (Libertyville, Illinois) =

Historic house in Illinois, United States

- Ansel B. Cook Home
- U.S. National Register of Historic Places
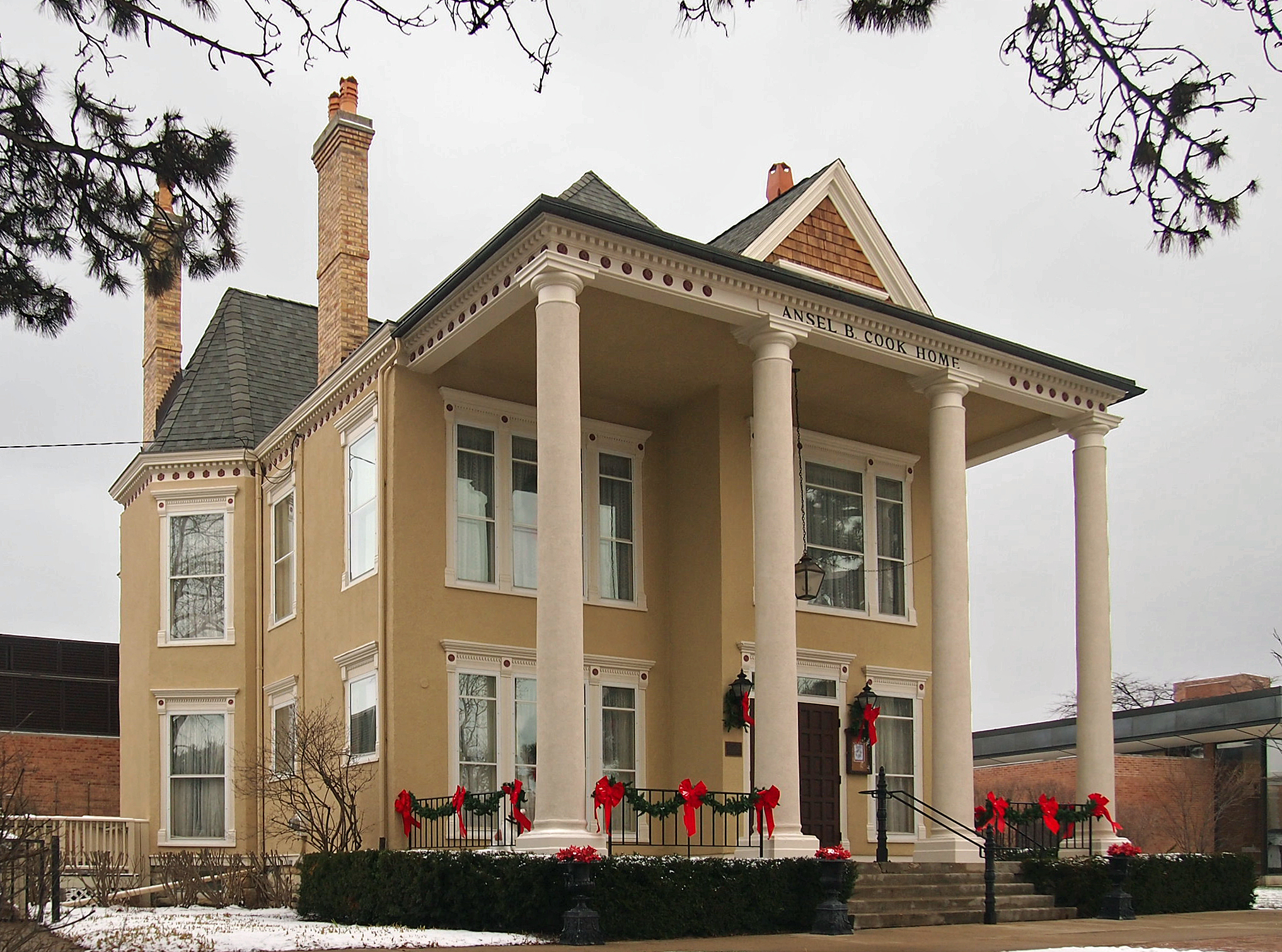

- Location within Illinois Location within the United States
- Location: 413 N. Milwaukee Ave., Libertyville, Illinois
- Coordinates: 42°17′14″N 87°57′19″W
- Area: less than one acre
- Built: 1921
- Architect: Ansel B. Cook
- Architectural style: Classical Revival
- NRHP reference No.: 01000867
- Added to NRHP: August 16, 2001

The Ansel B. Cook House, is a historic house museum in Libertyville, Illinois, United States. It was built as a Victorian house for contractor and politician Ansel B. Cook in 1878. In his will, Cook donated the home to be used as a public library, although it remained for many years the residence of Cook's longer-lived widow. After Emily Barrows Cook's death, the building received a major Neoclassical renovation that converted it into a library, opening to the public in 1921.

By the 1960s the library had outgrown the space available, and voters approved a referendum to construct a new library. The new facility of what is now the Cook Memorial Public Library District opened directly behind the Cook House in 1968.

The building was listed on the U.S. National Register of Historic Places in 2001. Today the Libertyville–Mundelein Historical Society operates the house as a Victorian house museum.
