= Dr. Wallace C. Abbott House =

House in Chicago, Illinois

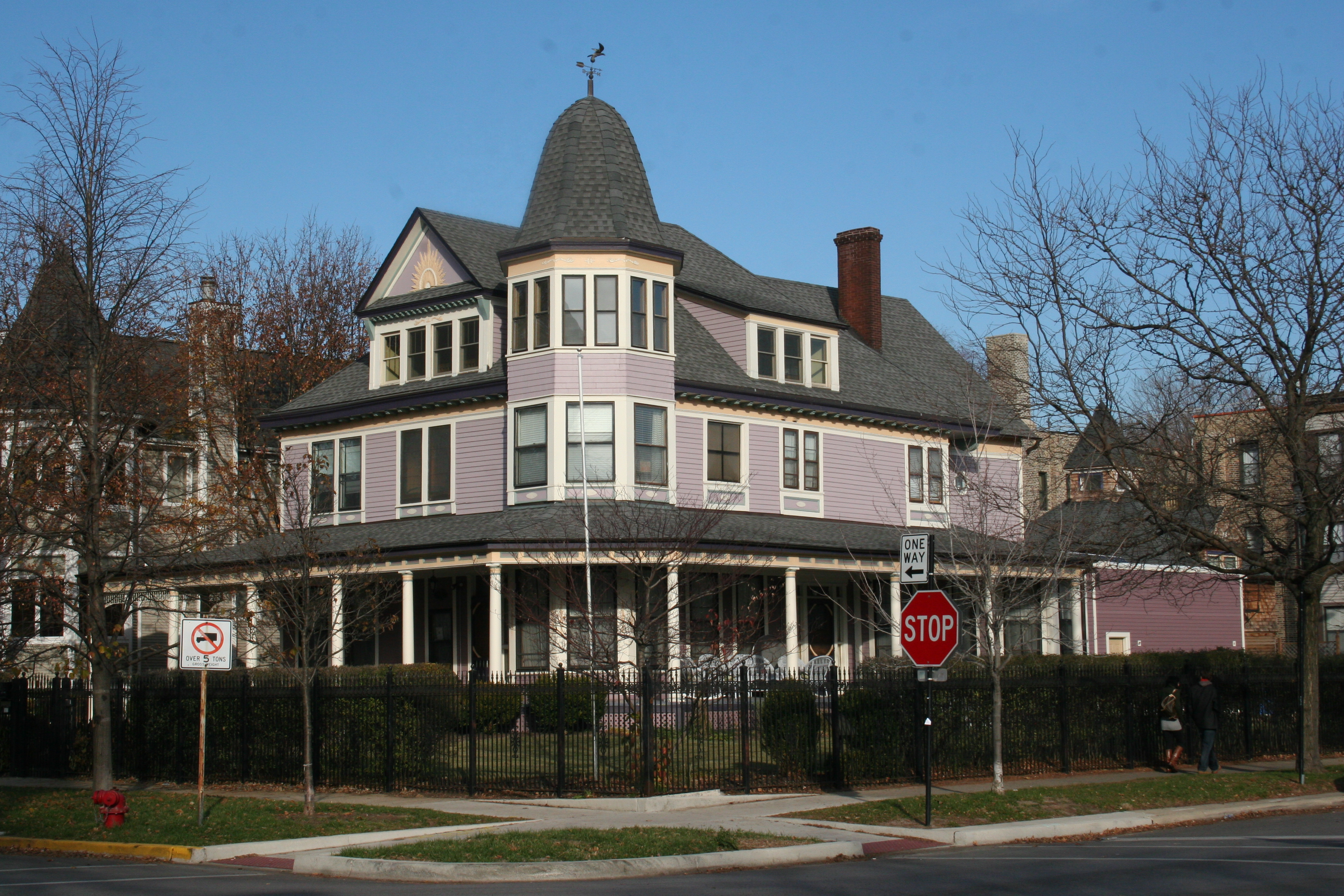
- Building from corner

- Location within Greater Chicago Dr. Wallace C. Abbott House (Illinois) Dr. Wallace C. Abbott House (the United States)

General information
- Architectural style: Queen Anne-Style
- Location: 4605 N Hermitage Ave Ravenswood, Chicago, Illinois, United States
- Coordinates: 41°57′55″N 87°40′20″W
- Construction started: 1890
- Completed: 1891
- Client: Dr. Wallace C. Abbott

Technical details
- Floor count: 3

Design and construction
- Architects: Dahlgren and Lievendahl

Chicago Landmark
- Designated: March 1, 2006

The Dr. Wallace C. Abbott House was designated a landmark by the city of Chicago, Illinois on March 1, 2006. The home was built in 1891 for the founder of Abbott Laboratories. In 2019, it was described as a private, "7,000-square-foot Victorian, which has five bedrooms, solar panels and a rentable coach house and is prominent on a corner lot that's the equivalent of 4.9 standard 25-by-125-foot Chicago lots."

A replica of the house exists on the Abbott Laboratories corporate campus in Green Oaks, Illinois. The replica contains some elements taken from the original, including the front door, a fireplace mantel, some stained glass, and a steppingstone, engraved with the name Wallace Abbott, for getting into and out of carriages. The replica is closed to the public.
