= Libertyville District 70 =

School district in Illinois, United States

Coordinates: 42°17′27.4″N 87°58′47.3″W

Libertyville District 70 is located in Libertyville, Illinois, about 35 miles north of Chicago in the suburbs.

The district includes four elementary schools and one middle school. The elementary schools run from kindergarten through fifth grade, while the middle school consists of sixth, seventh and eighth grades.

The district school year runs from mid- to late-August through early- to mid-June. District 70 is on the trimester system, uses parent-teacher conferences and also allows for student-led parent/teacher conferences.

The district superintendent is Mrs. Rebecca Jenkins, who was hired by the Board of Education and began in the top slot on April 1, 2022. Before becoming superintendent, she was deputy superintendent for both Lake Forest District 67 and Lake Forest High School District 115. Before working in central office administration, Jenkins was a middle school principal for nine years in Aptakisic-Tripp Elementary School District 102 in Buffalo Grove. Il. She also worked as an assistant principal for an elementary school in D102 for two years. During her first five years in education, Jenkins, known for her collaborative style, was an elementary teacher in Northbrook, Grayslake, and Gurnee.

For the 2024-25 school year (Spring 2025 testing), the Illinois State Board of Education (ISBE) updated the scoring and performance levels for the Illinois Assessment of Readiness (IAR) in English Language Arts (ELA) and Mathematics to better align with college and career readiness standards. In 2024-25 school year on the Illinois Assessment of Readiness (IAR), students in third through eighth grade, 79 percent of students met or exceeded standards in English/Arts while 65 percent of students met or exceeded standards in math. On the 2024-25 Illinois Science Assessment (ISA), administered to students in grades 5 and 8, 77 percent of students met or exceeded standards.

This is a high-achieving school district with very involved parents. More than 80 percent of the teachers have master's degrees. (see ref. below, also see d70schools.org, school report card for more information.)

All District 70 schools have been awarded the National Blue Ribbon of Excellence Award from the U.S. Dept. of Education, with several of the schools earning the award twice. The coveted National Blue Ribbon School award affirms the hard work of students, educators, families, and communities in creating safe and welcoming schools where students master challenging and engaging content. (Ref. U.S. Dept. of Education National Blue Ribbon Schools Program.)

Adler Park, Butterfield, Copeland Manor, Highland Middle, and Rockland schools were honored in 2011 and 2010 with the highest academic award given by the Illinois State Board of Education for providing students with a high-quality education. Each of the five schools in Libertyville Elementary District 70 received the highest award, an “Academic Excellence Award.” In 2010, Academic Excellence Awards recognized 459 schools that have sustained very high academic performance over at least three years. In 2009, the District 70 schools were included with only 438 schools in the state to receive the award. In order to qualify for the award, those 438 schools showed they could sustain high student performance over at least three years. The award was given to schools where at least 90% of students met or exceeded state standards in 2007-2009 and 2008-2010. (Ref. Illinois State Board of Education website.)

== Adler Park Elementary School ==
Adler Park has the smallest student population in the district, with 234 children attending for the 2021-22 school year and 33 staff members. Adler has been recognized as a U.S. Department of Education's National Blue Ribbon School twice, once in 2001 and then in 1991. The school opened in 1959, but closed in 1980 due to declining enrollment; it reopened in 1987, as a kindergarten through third grade building. Over time, the population grew, and fourth and fifth grades were added. The school is located at 1740 N. Milwaukee Ave. The principal is Dr. Kerri Bongle. The school mascot, the Adler 'Gator' (now named "Sporty") was created in 1987 by reopening inaugural student Andy Bokalders.

== Butterfield Elementary School ==
Butterfield Elementary School

Location
- 1441 W. Lake Street; Libertyville, Illinois 60048; United States

Information
- School type: public elementary school
- Opened: 1970
- Status: Open
- School district: Libertyville District 70
- Superintendent: Mrs. Rebecca Jenkins
- Principal: Dr. Candice Kehoe
- Faculty: 76
- Grades: k-5
- Gender: coed
- Campus: suburban
- Colours: Green; Gold
- Mascot: Buddy the Bulldog
- Nickname: Bulldogs
- Team name: Libertyville
- Newspaper: Butterfield Newsletters
- Website: https://butterfield.d70schools.org/ Butterfield School

Of the four elementary schools, Butterfield School is the largest with 448 students attending for the 2021-22 school year with 76 staff members. It opened its doors in 1970 and has transitioned from an Open School architectural design that was popular at the time with kindergarten through eighth grade, to an elementary school with halls and walls and offering kindergarten through fifth grade. Butterfield was named a U.S. Department of Education Blue Ribbon School of Excellence in 1993. Butterfield School is located at 1441 W. Lake St. The principal is Dr. Candice Kehoe. The Educational Resource Center, which houses the school district administrators, is located next door, at 1381 W. Lake St., with 29 staff members.

== Copeland Manor Elementary School ==
Copeland Manor School has 376 students enrolled for the 2021-22 school year with 52 staff members, making it the second-largest elementary school. Built in 1957, Copeland Manor School is located at 801 South Seventh Avenue in Libertyville, Illinois. Based on 90% or more of Copeland's students meeting or exceeding state expectations on math and reading on the Illinois Standards Achievement Test (ISAT)., Copeland Manor School has been identified as an "Academic School of Excellence" since 2006. One hundred percent of the fourth and fifth grade student met or exceeded state expectations for 2009 math tests for ISAT. The principal of Copeland Manor School is Annette McBride.

== Rockland Elementary School ==
Rockland School's enrollment for the 2021-22 school year is 300 students with 42 staff members, and the oldest school building in the district, built in 1927. Rockland has been recognized as a U.S. Department of Education's National Blue Ribbon School twice, most recently in 2014, and back in 1989. The school is located at 160 W. Rockland Road, across the street from Highland Middle School on the NE corner of Rockland Rd. and Stewart Ave. The Principal of Rockland School is Jim Cieciwa.

== Highland Middle School ==
Highland Middle School is home to 771 students in the 2021-22 school year with 103 staff members. It includes grades sixth through eight. The school was originally constructed in 1949. Highland has been recognized as a U.S. Department of Education's National Blue Ribbon School of Excellence twice, in 2010 and 20 years earlier in 1990. Highland also has been recognized three times as an Illinois Horizon School to Watch, most recently in 2022, and originally in 2015 and the in 2018. Highland has been awarded the Academic Excellence Award since in 2008 in acknowledgment of more than 90% of students meeting or exceeding state standards in reading and math for three consecutive years. The school is located at 310 W. Rockland Road, across from Rockland School. The Principal of Highland is Dr. Jon Hallmark, the Assistant Principal is Valerie Rivera and the Dean of Students is Kristi Martin.

Highland Middle School

Location
- 310 W. Rockland Road; Libertyville, Illinois 60048; United States

Information
- School type: public middle school
- Motto: If it's to be, it's up to me
- Opened: 1949
- Status: Open
- School district: Libertyville District 70
- Superintendent: Mrs. Rebecca Jenkins
- Principal: Dr. Jon Hallmark
- Faculty: 103
- Grades: 6-8
- Gender: coed
- Campus: suburban
- Colours: Gold; Maroon
- Athletics conference: Lakeside Conference
- Nickname: Hornets
- Team name: Libertyville
- Newspaper: Highland Newsletters
- Website: https://highland.d70schools.org

== See also ==
- Libertyville, Illinois
- Libertyville High School
- Community High School District 128
