= Clarissa Cook Home for the Friendless =

Historic building in Davenport, Iowa, US

- U.S. National Register of Historic Places
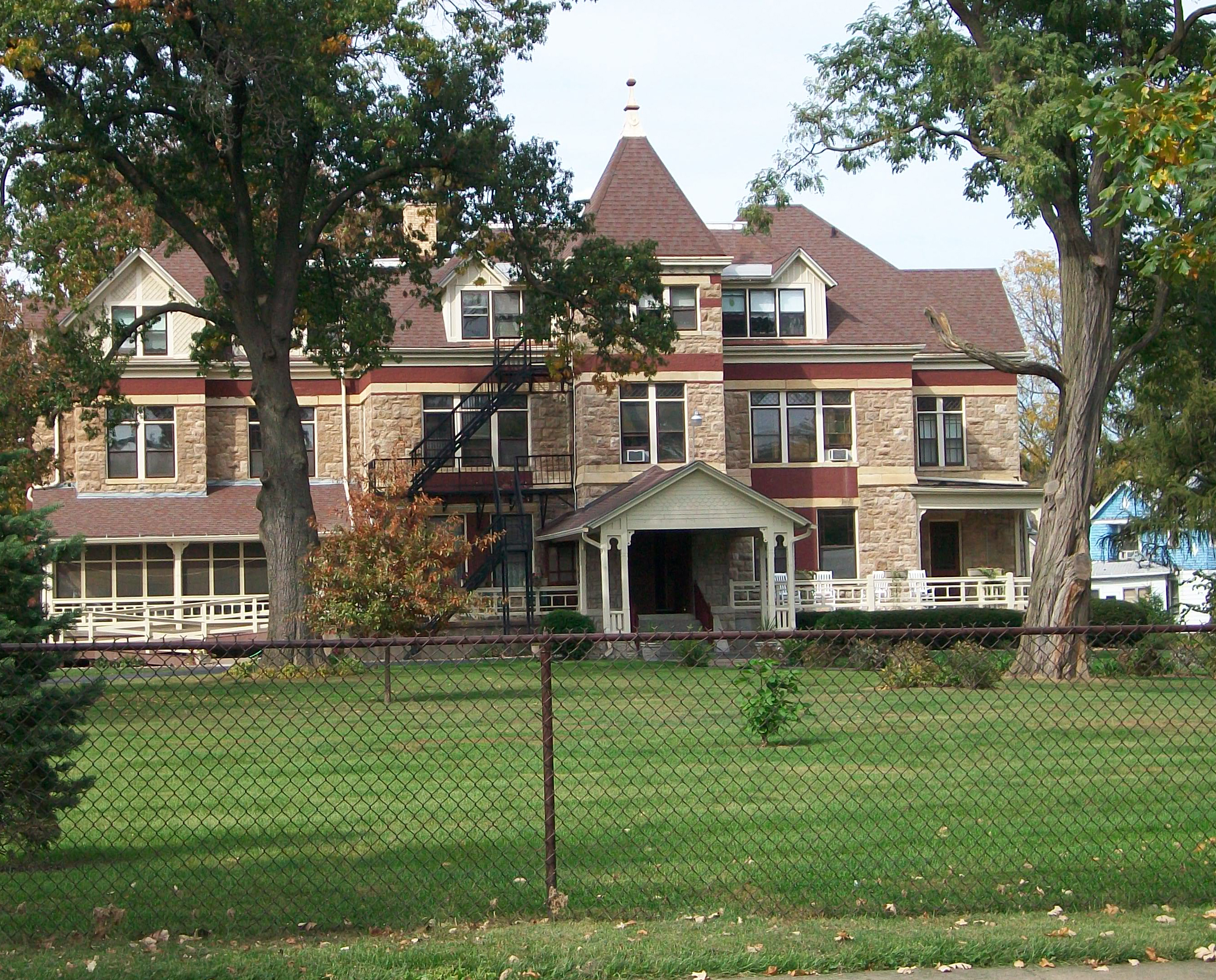

- Location within Iowa Location within the United States
- Location: 2223 W. 1st St. Davenport, Iowa
- Coordinates: 41°31′9″N 90°36′37″W
- Area: 5.3 acres (2.1 ha)
- Built: 1884
- Built by: T.W. McClelland
- Architect: Eugene C. Gardner; A.N. Carpenter
- Architectural style: Late Victorian
- MPS: Davenport MRA
- NRHP reference No.: 83002414
- Added to NRHP: July 7, 1983

Clarissa Cook Home for the Friendless is a historic building located in the west end of Davenport, Iowa, United States. It was listed on the National Register of Historic Places in 1983.

== History ==
=== Ebenezer and Clarissa Cook ===
Ebenezer Cook was born February 14, 1810, in Oneida County, New York, to Ira and Rachel (Faxon) Cook. His younger brother was John Parsons Cook, and the two worked together their whole lives. Ebenezer bought 1,200 acres (490 ha) of land in 1835 that would in time become part of the city of Davenport, and moved there with his extended family in 1836. He and his brother entered the legal profession and helped establish Scott County in what was then the Wisconsin Territory. They were joined in their law practice with John Forrest Dillon, who later became a judge of the United States Circuit Court for the Eighth Circuit. The brothers became involved in banking and set up a chain of private banks across Iowa and Western Illinois until the country-wide panic which began in 1857. In 1851 the brothers were influential in routing the railroad through Davenport. Ebenezer became a director and then vice president of the Mississippi and Missouri Railroad when it was organized in 1853, and upon its subsequent consolidation became a director and later vice president of the Chicago, Rock Island and Pacific Railway. Ebenezer Cook died October 7, 1871.

Clarissa C. Cook (née Bryan) was born August 4, 1811, in Sydney, Delaware County, New York, and died February 19, 1879. She was a daughter of Fowler P. and Lucretia Bryan. She was known for carrying out the wishes of her husband and their philanthropy to the City of Davenport and the Episcopal Church. Through her generosity, both during her life and after her death, she was instrumental in building Trinity Church, the Cook Memorial Library, the Clarissa Cook Home for the Friendless and the establishment of a number of trusts for the benefit of the Episcopal parishes and activities in the Diocese of Iowa and elsewhere.

=== Establishment ===
In 1884 the Rt. Rev. William Stevens Perry proposed a goal to the Diocesan Convention that the Diocese of Iowa undertake a greater role in social ministry. The inspiration was the Social Gospel Movement that was popular at the time. The Clarissa Cook Home became part of the mission of the diocese to carry out this goal. The original focus of the facility was indigent women who were 60 years of age or older. They were required to pay a $100 admission fee and they were given a place to live for the rest of their lives. They were also required to have a black dress for their burial and a Bible. The home was set up for communal-style living. As time went on the home continued with a more general philosophy of housing elderly women without reference to their economic situation. The name of the facility was shortened to the Clarissa C. Cook Home. A gardener's cottage was added to the facility in 1893.

The facility was built on the former Ira Cook family homestead. The property contained the home, a stable for two cows, henhouse, garden, grape arbor, and a root cellar. It was originally located on a 15.3-acre (6.2 ha) site that was reduced to 5.3 acres (2.1 ha) in 1905. In that year 10 acres (4.0 ha) was used to create a new neighborhood in Davenport's West End. The lots were sold for $650 and the Cook Home underwrote the sales with loans so that those that bought the lots could build new houses.

=== Decline and transfer ===
In 1932 investment income and monthly income was no longer able to cover expenses. From 1932 to 1939 the Cook Home received financial assistance from the City of Davenport and Scott County. Many of the residents started to pay rent. The Home then experienced difficulties in retaining employees during World War II.

In March 2012 it was announced that because of the expansion of government subsidized housing in the area the home would close on September 30. At the time there were twelve residents. At its peak, it housed twenty residents. The Clarissa Cook board approached other non-profits about their interest in the property. In 2013 they donated the building to the Evangelical Lutheran Good Samaritan Society. The 35-room structure was renovated into nine apartments for senior citizens and they also provide senior living services. The project was completed in 2015. The Good Samaritan Society also operates another facility in the city's west end.

== Architecture ==
The Clarissa Cook Home was designed by Eugene C. Gardner, an architect in Springfield, Massachusetts; A. N. Carpenter served as the landscape architect. The building was constructed by local contractor T. M. McClelland. While the building does not follow any particular architectural style, it represents the trends that were popular in Victorian America. It has a somewhat medieval appearance, with heavy masonry, a polychrome exterior, numerous gabled pavilions, and a central entrance tower. The building's limestone came from the Cook family's quarry near Buffalo, Iowa. The horizontality of the building is enhanced through its rectangular plan and belt coursing. The 2 1/2-story building is capped with a hipped roof.

Over the years the building was updated. An elevator was added in 1946 and sprinklers were added in 1961. The nine apartments that were created in the facility in 2015 range in size from over 500 square feet (46 m^{2}) to over 900 square feet (84 m^{2}). The first floor continues to have common space for residents to use and many of the original architectural details remain on that floor as well.
