= Donna Johnson (mayor) =

American politician who served as mayor of Libertyville, Illinois

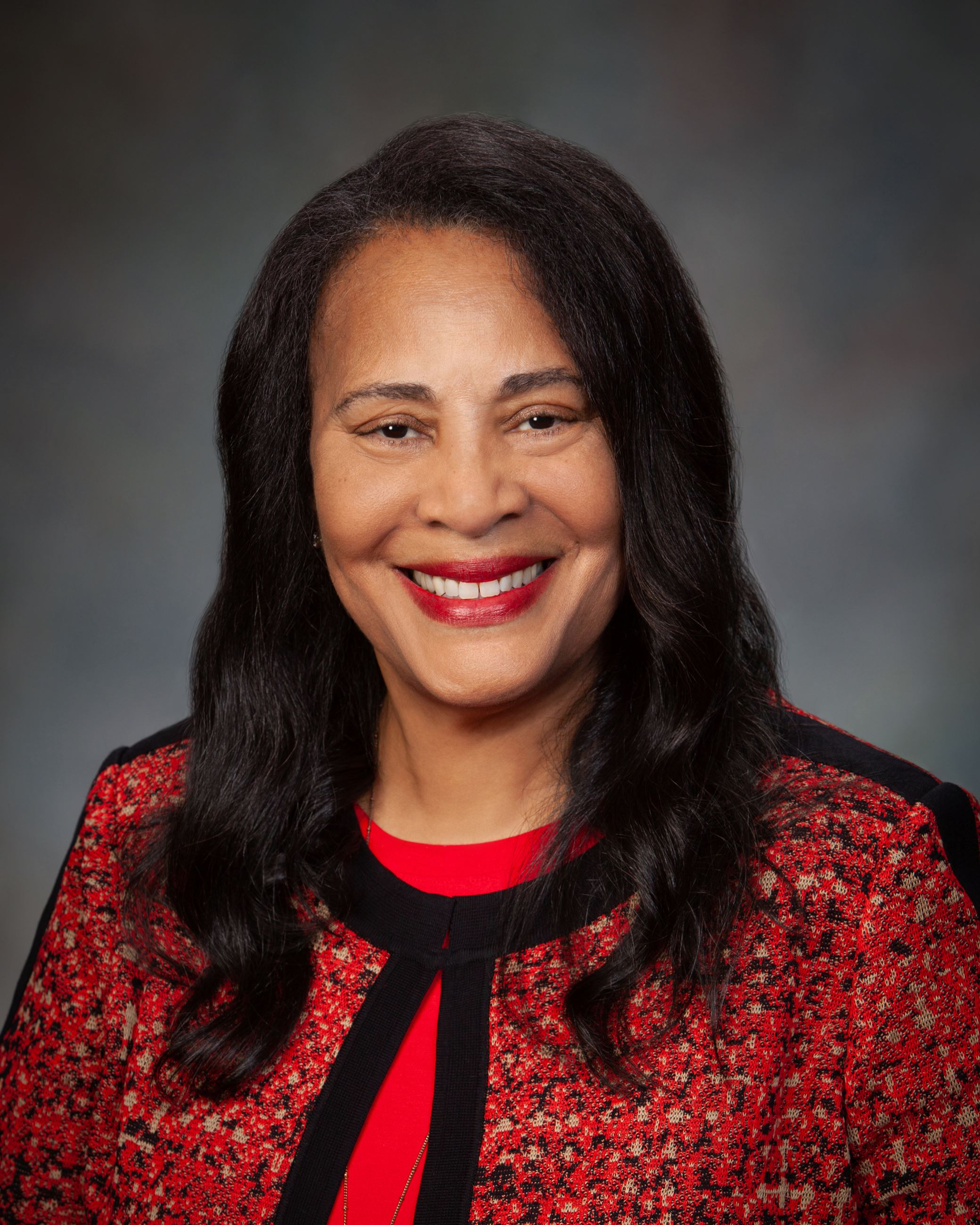

Mayor of Libertyville, Illinois
- In office May 4, 2021 – Incumbent
- Preceded by: Terry Weppler

Libertyville Board of Trustees
- In office 2007–2021

Personal details
- Party: Independent

Donna Johnson is an American politician. In 2021, she became the first Black woman elected mayor of Libertyville, Illinois.

== Early life and education ==
Johnson is the daughter of Carol and Donald Tyler Johnson. Her mother was the Chair of the Civil Service Commission and Human Relations Commission in Evanston, Illinois; her father graduated from the University of Illinois Grainger College of Engineering but according to Johnson, was unable to find work as a chemical engineer due to segregation. Her father worked for the Chicago Fire Department, eventually becoming a battalion chief.

Johnson moved with her family from Evanston to Libertyville in 1979. She completed a BA in political science from Michigan State University and a JD degree.

== Career ==
Johnson worked as prosecutor in Cook County and Lake County before taking a position at Allstate as a corporate attorney. She served for nine years on the Libertyville Plan Commission board of appeals before running for office, and worked to develop the business presence in downtown Libertyville. In 2007, she was elected to the Libertyville Board of Trustees. Her work as a trustee included serving as the chair of the Streets Committee. In 2018, while serving as a member of the Board of Trustees, she advocated for a pay increase for elected officials to help increase the number of qualified candidates for office. As of 2020, Johnson was also serving as Chair of the Advocate Condell Medical Center Governing Board.

After serving 14 years as a trustee, she was recruited by the current mayor Terry Weppler and others to run for mayor. She ran unopposed and was elected mayor following the election on April 6, 2021. She was sworn in on May 4, 2021. She is the first Black mayor in the city's 185-year history. Libertyville has a Black population of 1.3%, according to the United States Census Bureau, and she is the second woman and first person of color to serve as mayor.

After taking office, Johnson announced her priorities as including a balanced budget, the development of the downtown business district, and the promotion of small businesses. During her tenure, a local cannabis sales tax was enacted for Libertyville, and $170,000 was awarded to local businesses through the Libertyville High Five Grant program. In March 2022, she announced the sale of the Libertyville indoor sports complex to the Canadian firm Canlan Sports for $3.13 million; the village had been trying to sell the complex for years due to high debt payments.

== Personal life ==
Johnson is a member of the Proclaimer Ministry of St. Joseph's Catholic Church. She has two children.

== See also ==
- List of first African-American mayors
