= Francis J. Berry =

American politician

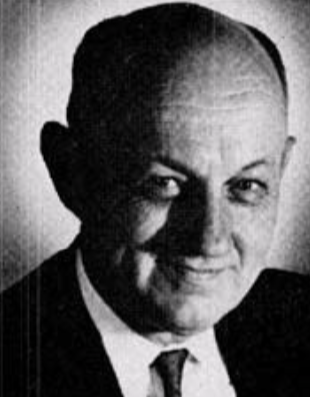

Member of the Illinois House of Representatives

Personal details
- Born: July 9, 1912
- Died: January 6, 1983 (age 70) Libertyville, Illinois
- Party: Republican

Francis J. Berry (July 9, 1912 – January 6, 1983) was an American politician who served as a member of the Illinois House of Representatives.

== Biography ==
Berry served as mayor of Libertyville, Illinois from 1953 to 1965. He died on January 6, 1983, at Condell Memorial Hospital in Libertyville, Illinois.
