= Rondout School District 72 =

School district in Illinois, United States

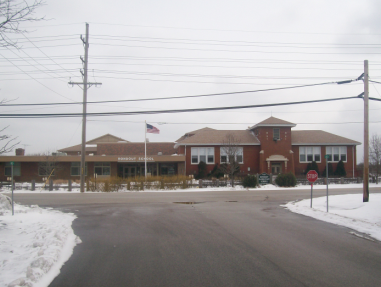
- Rondout School, the lone school in the district

Address
- 28593 North Bradley Road Lake Forest, Illinois; United States

District information
- Superintendent: Dr. Jenny Wojcik

Other information
- Website: Official website

Rondout School District 72 is a K-8 one school district located in Rondout, Illinois, an unincorporated community in Libertyville Township, Lake County, Illinois. The district serves students from the surrounding communities of Green Oaks, Lake Bluff, Mettawa, and unincorporated Lake Forest. 144 students are enrolled in the district as of 2023. The district's sole school, aptly known as Rondout Elementary School, is headed by Elizabeth Davis, the principal. The district is headed by Dr. Jenny Wojcik, the long-serving superintendent.

== Enrollment ==
- 2008: 161
- 2023: 144
