= Libertyville, Illinois =

- Village
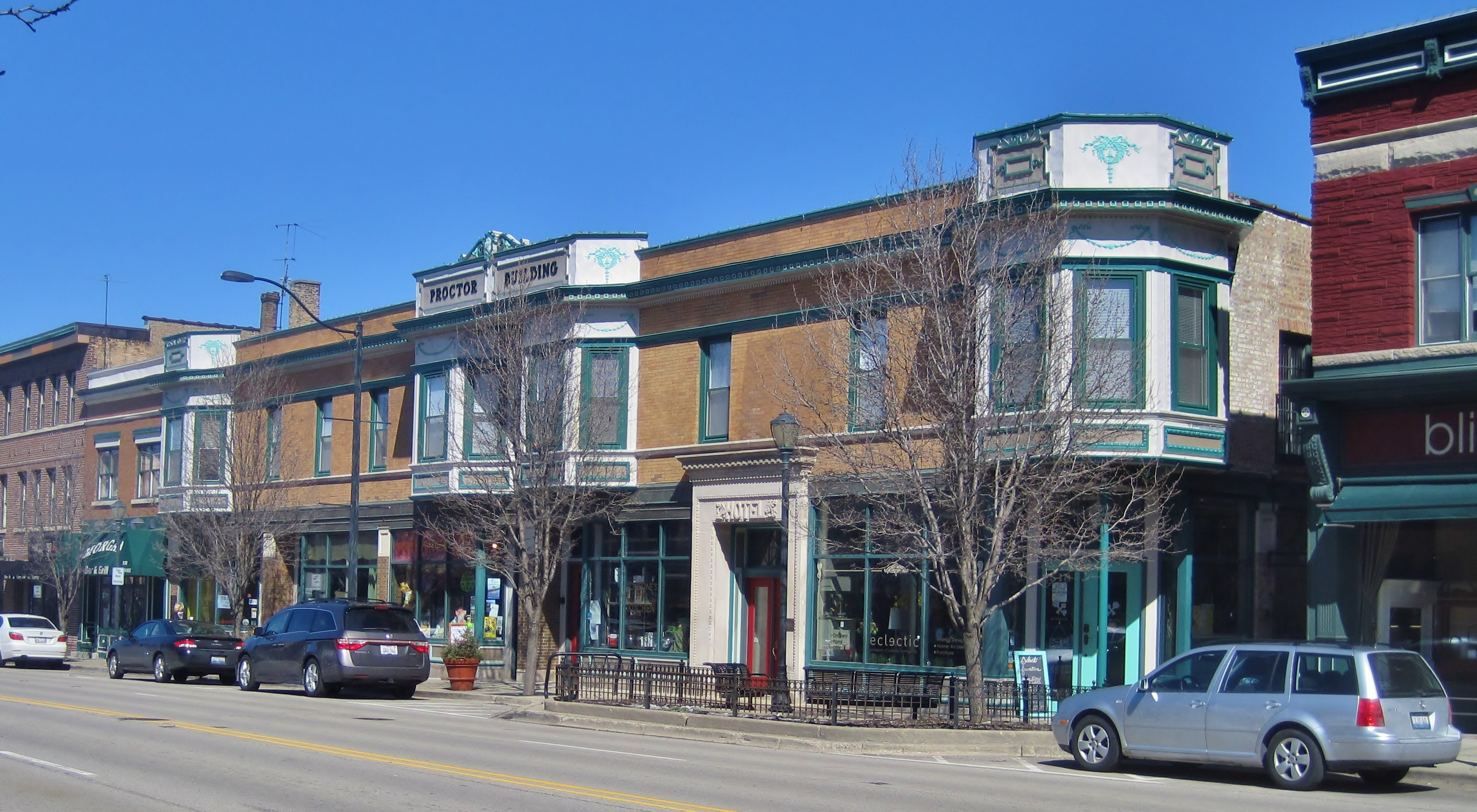
- The Proctor Building in Libertyville (1903), taken in March 2013

- Flag Logo
- Motto(s): Fortitudine Vincimus "By endurance we conquer"
- Location of Libertyville in Lake County, Illinois.
- Coordinates: 42°17′03″N 87°56′42″W
- Country: United States
- State: Illinois
- County: Lake
- Township: Libertyville

Government
  - Mayor: Donna Johnson

Area
  - Total: 9.16 sq mi (23.72 km^{2})
  - Land: 8.81 sq mi (22.81 km^{2})
  - Water: 0.35 sq mi (0.90 km^{2}) 3.83%
- Elevation: 692 ft (211 m)

Population (2020)
  - Total: 20,579
  - Density: 2,336/sq mi (902.1/km^{2})
- Time zone: UTC-6 (CST)
  - Summer (DST): UTC-5 (CDT)
- Zip Code: 60048
- Area code(s): 847, 224
- FIPS code: 17-43250
- GNIS feature ID: 2398436
- Website: www.libertyville.com

Libertyville is a village in Libertyville Township, Lake County, Illinois, United States. It is located 5 miles (8 km) west of Lake Michigan, approximately 40 miles north of the Chicago Loop. As such, it is part of the United States Census Bureau's Chicago combined statistical area (CSA). It is bordered by Gages Lake and Gurnee to the north, Vernon Hills to the south, Mundelein to the west, and Grayslake to the northwest. The eastern portions of the village border Mettawa, unincorporated Waukegan and Lake Forest, and part of Knollwood CDP. Its 2020 census population was 20,579.

== History ==
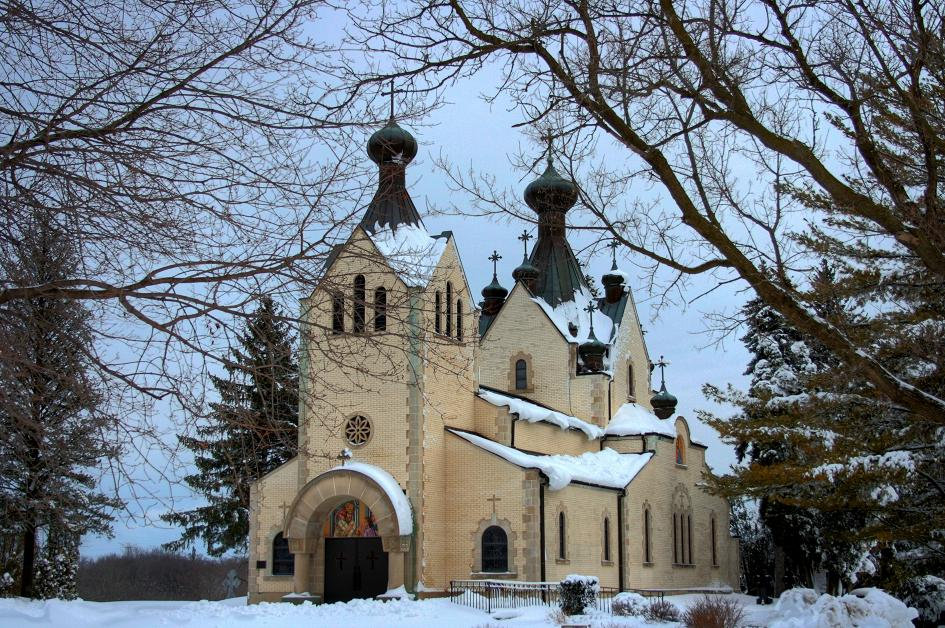
Saint Sava Serbian Orthodox Monastery Church is the former burial site of Peter II of Yugoslavia, who until 2013 was the only European monarch buried on U.S. soil.

The land that is now Libertyville was the property of the Illinois River Potawatomi Indians until August 1829, when economic and resource pressures forced the tribe to sell much of their land in northern Illinois to the U.S. government for $12,000 cash, an additional $12,000 in goods, plus an annual delivery of 50 barrels of salt.

Pursuant to the treaty, the Potawatomi left their lands by the mid-1830s, and by 1835 the future Libertyville had its first recorded non-indigenous resident, George Vardin. Said to be a "well-educated" English immigrant with a wife and a young daughter, Vardin lived in a cabin located where the Cook Park branch of the Cook Memorial Public Library District stands today. Though he apparently moved on to the west that same year, the settlement that grew up around his cabin was initially known as Vardin's Grove.

In 1836, during the celebrations that marked the 60th anniversary of the U.S. Declaration of Independence, the community voted to name itself Independence Grove. 1837 brought the town's first practicing physician, Jesse Foster, followed quickly by its first lawyer, Horace Butler, for whom Butler Lake is named. The professionals needed services, so a post office opened, necessitating a third name change, because another Independence Grove existed elsewhere in the state. On April 16, 1837, the new post office was registered under the name Libertyville.

The town's name changed again two years later to Burlington when it became the county seat of Lake County. When the county seat moved to Little Fort (now Waukegan) in 1841, the name reverted to Libertyville, without further changes.

Libertyville's most prominent building, the Cook Mansion, was built in 1879 by Ansel Brainerd Cook, very close to the spot where Vardin's cabin was built in the 1830s. Cook, a teacher and stonemason, became a prominent Chicago builder and politician, providing flagstones for the city's sidewalks and taking part in rebuilding after the Great Chicago Fire of 1871. The two-story Victorian mansion served as Cook's summer home as well as the center of his horse farm, which provided animals for Chicago's horsecar lines. The building was remodeled in 1921, when it became the town library, gaining a Colonial-style facade with a pillared portico. The building is now a museum with furnishings of the period and other relevant displays. It is operated by the Libertyville-Mundelein Historical Society.

The community expanded rapidly with a spur of the Milwaukee Road train line (now a Metra commuter line) reaching Libertyville in 1881, resulting in the incorporation of the Village of Libertyville in 1882, with John Locke its first village president.

Libertyville's downtown area was largely destroyed by fire in 1895, and the village board mandated brick to be used for reconstruction, resulting in a village center whose architecture is substantially unified by both period and building material. The National Trust for Historic Preservation, which gave Libertyville a Great American Main Street Award, called the downtown "a place with its own sense of self, where people still stroll the streets on a Saturday night, and where the tailor, the hometown bakery, and the vacuum cleaner repair shop are shoulder to shoulder with gourmet coffee vendors and a microbrewery. If it's Thursday between 7 a.m. and 1 p.m., it's Farmer's Market time (June–October) on Church Street across from Cook Park -- a tradition for more than three decades."

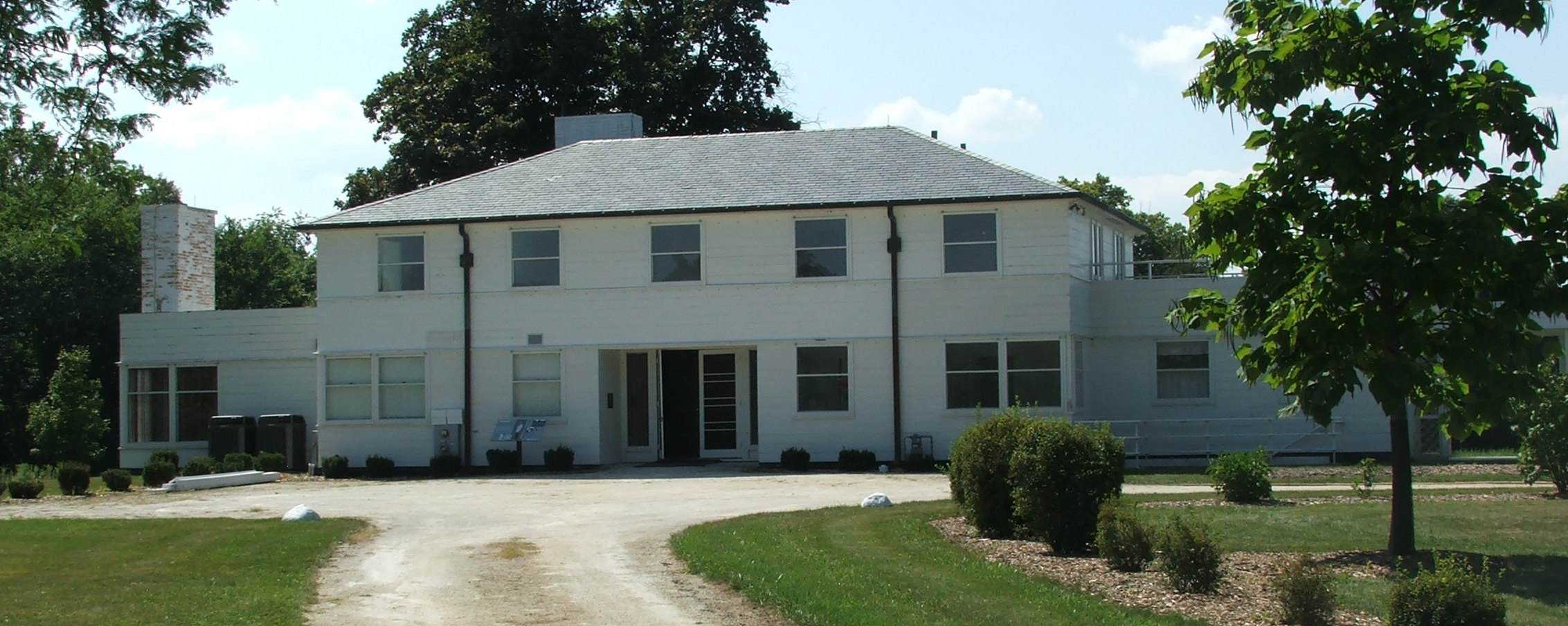
Adlai Stevenson II's home in Libertyville, IL (now Mettawa, IL)

Samuel Insull, founder of Commonwealth Edison, began purchasing land south of Libertyville in 1906. He eventually acquired 4,445 acres (17.99 km^{2}), a holding that he named Hawthorn-Mellody Farms. He also bought the Chicago & Milwaukee Electric line (later the Chicago, North Shore & Milwaukee), which built a spur from Lake Bluff to Libertyville in 1903. When Insull was ruined by the Great Depression, parts of his estate were bought by prominent Chicagoans Adlai Stevenson and John F. Cuneo. The home Cuneo built is now the Cuneo Museum.

From 1970 until 2013, Libertyville was the resting place of the only European monarch buried on American soil, Peter II of Yugoslavia, who died in exile in Denver. On 22 January 2013, Peter II's remains were removed from his tomb at St. Sava Serbian Orthodox Monastery and sent to Serbia in a ceremony attended by the Serbian Prime Minister Ivica Dačić, Peter's son Alexander with his family, and Serbian Patriarch Irinej. Peter II lay in state in the Royal Chapel in Dedinje before his burial in the Royal Family Mausoleum at Oplenac on May 26, 2013.

== Geography ==
According to the 2021 census gazetteer files, Libertyville has a total area of 9.16 square miles (23.72 km^{2}), of which 8.81 square miles (22.82 km^{2}) (or 96.19%) is land and 0.35 square miles (0.91 km^{2}) (or 3.81%) is water.

The Des Plaines River forms much of the eastern boundary of the village. Other bodies of water include Butler Lake, Liberty Lake, and Lake Minear.

Libertyville's main street is Milwaukee Avenue (Illinois Route 21). The main automobile route to Chicago is via Interstate 94 (the Tri-State Tollway and the Edens Expressway); Chicago's Loop is approximately 45 minutes away. The main Metra rail station sits at the northern edge of downtown off Milwaukee Avenue, and serves the Milwaukee District North Line running from Union Station in Chicago to Fox Lake. The same line is served by another Metra station at Prairie Crossing, near the boundary of Libertyville and Grayslake. Prairie Crossing station also serves Metra's North Central Service, with service from Union Station to Antioch.

== Demographics ==
Historical population
Census	Pop.	Note	%±
1880	695		—
1890	550		−20.9%
1900	864		57.1%
1910	1,724		99.5%
1920	2,125		23.3%
1930	3,791		78.4%
1940	3,930		3.7%
1950	5,425		38.0%
1960	8,560		57.8%
1970	11,684		36.5%
1980	16,520		41.4%
1990	19,174		16.1%
2000	20,742		8.2%
2010	20,315		−2.1%
2020	20,579		1.3%
U.S. Decennial Census; 2010 2020

=== Racial and ethnic composition ===
Libertyville village, Illinois – Racial and ethnic composition Note: the US Census treats Hispanic/Latino as an ethnic category. This table excludes Latinos from the racial categories and assigns them to a separate category. Hispanics/Latinos may be of any race.
Race / Ethnicity (NH = Non-Hispanic)	Pop 2000	Pop 2010	Pop 2020	% 2000	% 2010	% 2020
White alone (NH)	18,812	17,777	17,061	90.70%	87.51%	82.90%
Black or African American alone (NH)	209	232	262	1.01%	1.14%	1.27%
Native American or Alaska Native alone (NH)	18	14	14	0.09%	0.07%	0.07%
Asian alone (NH)	948	1,154	1,238	4.57%	5.68%	6.02%
Native Hawaiian or Pacific Islander alone (NH)	6	4	4	0.03%	0.02%	0.02%
Other race alone (NH)	13	16	55	0.06%	0.08%	0.27%
Mixed race or Multiracial (NH)	170	282	759	0.82%	1.39%	3.69%
Hispanic or Latino (any race)	566	836	1,186	2.73%	4.12%	5.76%
Total	20,742	20,315	20,579	100.00%	100.00%	100.00%

=== 2020 census ===
As of the 2020 census, Libertyville had a population of 20,579, with a population density of 2,247.35 inhabitants per square mile (867.71/km^{2}). 100.0% of residents lived in urban areas, while 0.0% lived in rural areas.

The median age was 44.3 years. 23.8% of residents were under the age of 18 and 18.6% of residents were 65 years of age or older. For every 100 females there were 94.5 males, and for every 100 females age 18 and over there were 92.2 males age 18 and over.

There were 7,611 households and 5,478 families in Libertyville, of which 34.2% had children under the age of 18 living in them. Of all households, 63.5% were married-couple households, 12.5% were households with a male householder and no spouse or partner present, and 21.1% were households with a female householder and no spouse or partner present. About 23.0% of all households were made up of individuals, and 10.5% had someone living alone who was 65 years of age or older.

There were 8,103 housing units at an average density of 884.90 per square mile (341.66/km^{2}), of which 6.1% were vacant. The homeowner vacancy rate was 1.7% and the rental vacancy rate was 10.7%.

=== Income and poverty ===
The median income for a household in the village was $150,580, and the median income for a family was $192,500. Males had a median income of $107,121 versus $51,353 for females. The per capita income for the village was $72,487. About 1.4% of families and 3.0% of the population were below the poverty line, including 1.3% of those under age 18 and 5.8% of those age 65 or over.

== Government ==
Donna Johnson was elected mayor of Libertyville in April 2021. She is the first African-American, and the second woman, to hold the position.

Libertyville is represented by Jennifer Clark on the Lake County Board.

Mayors of Libertyville, Illinois

Image	Mayor	Years	Notes
	John Locke	May 15, 1882 – May 7, 1883	
	Josiah W. Butler	1885–1886	Son of state representative Horace Butler
	Franklin P. Dymond	1887–1889	
	Isbon S. Gleason	1889–1890	
	Charles H. Averill	1890–1891	
	Isbon S. Gleason (2nd term)	1891–1892	
	Charles H. Averill (2nd term)	1892–1898	
	Abner Weston Waldo	April 19, 1898 – April 1901	
	C. Frank Wright	April 1901 – April 1903	
	Frank Hampton Just	April 1903 – April 1905	Publisher of the Waukegan News-Sun
	Paul MacGuffin	April 1905 – April 1907	
	Henry B. Eger	April 1907 – April 1909; April 1909 – April 1911	Elected Chairman of the Lake County Board of Supervisors in April 1915. Died April 1924
	Robert P. Schnaebele	April 1911 – April 1913; April 1913 – April 1915	
	Jay B. Morse	April 1915 – April 1917; April 1917 – April 1919; April 1919 – April 1921	
	Jesse S. Hyatt	April 1921 – April 1927	
	Earl H. Corlett	April 1927 – April 1929; April 1929 – April 1931	
	Samuel P. Evilsizor	April 1931 – April 1933	
	Arthur E. Suter	April 1933 – 1944	
	Albert Kroll	1945–1949	
	John J. "Jack" Jaeger	1949–1953	
	Francis J. Berry	1953–1965	Served as an Illinois state representative (1965–1966)
	Charles Brown	1965–1973	
	Gilbert Stiles	1973–1981	
	Paul M. Neal	1981–1989	
	Jo Ann Eckmann	1989–1997	
	Duan Laska	1997–2005	
	Jeff Harger	2005–2009	
	Terry Weppler	2009–2021	
	Donna Johnson	2021–Present	First African American and 2nd woman mayor

== Education ==
=== Libertyville District 70 ===
Libertyville has four public elementary schools and one public middle school within village lines, all comprising Libertyville District 70:

- Adler Park Elementary School
- Butterfield Elementary School
- Copeland Manor Elementary School
- Rockland Elementary School
- Highland Middle School

=== Hawthorn District 73 ===
Students residing south of Golf Road attend Hawthorn District 73 schools in Vernon Hills.

=== Oak Grove District 68 ===
Students residing in communities along Buckley Road attend Oak Grove Grade School in neighboring Green Oaks.

=== Libertyville High School ===
Libertyville High School, part of Community High School District 128, serves students in Libertyville and other communities in Libertyville Township. Students residing south of Golf Road but north of Greentree Parkway or Red Top Drive are permitted to register for Vernon Hills High School or Libertyville High School, which consolidates District 70's Highland Middle School and Oak Grove School and Rondout Schools of Districts 72 and 68 respectively.

=== Other ===
The Roman Catholic St. Joseph Elementary School and St. John's Lutheran School of the Wisconsin Evangelical Lutheran Synod both provide Pre-K-8 education to residents of Libertyville and the surrounding area. St Sava Monastery is also home to the St. Sava Serbian Orthodox School of Theology.

== Economy ==
=== Top employers ===
According to the Village's 2020 Comprehensive Annual Financial Report, as of April 30, 2020 the top employers in the city were:

#	Employer	# of Employees
1	Advocate Condell Medical Center	2,102
2	Hollister Incorporated	527
3	Volkswagen Credit	446
4	Avexis	407
5	Medline Industries	343
6	Libertyville District 70	326
7	Fabrication Technologies	307
8	Commonwealth Edison	278
9	Snap-on Credit	242
10	Community High School District 128	239

== Parks and recreation ==
- Pools: Adler Pool, Riverside Pool
- Golf courses: Merit Club
- Lakes: Lake Minear, Butler Lake, Independence Grove, Liberty Lake
- Parks: Adler, Cook, Sunrise Rotary, Charles Brown, Riverside, Butler Lake, Nicholas-Dowden, Independence Grove, Blueberry Hill, Paul Neal, Greentree, Jo Ann Eckmann, Gilbert Stiles.

== Library ==
Libertyville is one of six communities comprising the Cook Memorial Public Library District. The Cook Park library, located on Cook and Brainerd streets in Libertyville, is one of the District's two library facilities. The library was originally housed in the Cook Mansion, after resident Ansel B. Cook's wife, Emily, deeded the property to the Village of Libertyville in 1920 for use as a library. In 1968, a 33,000-square-foot (3,100 m^{2}) addition was added, adjacent to the Cook home. By 1984, the library's collection, as well as the population, had doubled in size. The Evergreen Interim Library opened in 2003 as a temporary facility at the south end of the district, in Vernon Hills. In 2007, the Library Board adopted plans to add an approximately 10,000-square-foot (930 m^{2}) addition to the Cook Park facility, which was completed in January 2011.

== Media ==
The Libertyville Review, published by Pioneer Press, covers Libertyville. Regional newspapers that occasionally contain coverage of Libertyville include the Chicago Tribune, Daily Herald and Lake County News-Sun.

== Infrastructure ==
=== Transportation ===
Libertyville has a station on Metra's North Central Service (at Prairie Crossing) and also two stations along Metra's Milwaukee District North Line which provides service between Fox Lake and Union Station, one of which shares a driveway with the station for the North Central Service.

Pace provides bus service on Route 574 connecting Libertyville to Grayslake and other destinations.

Major roads include:

- Tri-State Tollway (Interstate 94)
- Milwaukee Avenue
- Lake Street
- Buckley Road/Peterson Road
- Park Avenue
- Midlothian Road
- Winchester Road
- Butterfield Road
- St. Mary's Road
- Golf Road

=== Utilities ===
The Libertyville water supply comes from the Central Lake County Joint Action Water Agency (CLCJAWA) located in Lake Bluff. CLCJAWA purifies water from Lake Michigan.

== Notable people ==
=== Music ===
- Jim Broustis, guitarist for the band X-tal
- MC chris, rapper, voice actor, and improvisational comedian
- Maureen Herman, bassist for the band Babes in Toyland
- Adam Jones, guitarist for the band Tool
- Tom Morello, guitarist for the bands Rage Against the Machine, Audioslave, and The Nightwatchman
- Ike Reilly, indie rock musician

=== Politics ===
- Francis J. Berry, Illinois state representative and former mayor
- Horace Butler, Illinois state representative
- Phil Collins, Libertyville trustee and Prohibition Party candidate for the 2020 United States presidential election
- Ansel B. Cook, Illinois state representative
- Donna Johnson, first African-American mayor of Libertyville
- Jo Jorgensen, Libertarian Party candidate for President in 2020
- Richard J. Lyons, Illinois state representative and lawyer
- Adlai Stevenson, 31st Governor of Illinois and Democratic nominee for President in 1952

=== Sports ===
- Cedric Benson, former running back in the National Football League
- Mark Bortz, former guard in the National Football League
- Brett Butler, former center fielder for several Major League Baseball teams and 1991 All-Star
- Rashied Davis, former wide receiver in the National Football League
- Roberto Garza, former center in the National Football League
- Marshall Hollingsworth, professional soccer player
- Baggio Hušidić, former professional soccer player
- Charles Leno, former offensive tackle in the National Football League
- Mike Marshall, former right fielder for several Major League Baseball teams and 1984 All-Star
- Steve Novak, former forward for several National Basketball Association teams
- Drew Peterson, small forward in the National Basketball Association
- Ted Phillips, former president of the Chicago Bears
- Adam Podlesh, former punter in the National Football League
- Evan Skoug, former minor league baseball player
- Dick Stanfel, former offensive guard and coach in the National Football League
- Frank Thomas, former first baseman for the Chicago White Sox, All-Star and two-time MLB American League MVP.
- Laura Zeng, former American rhythmic gymnast

=== Other ===
- David Adler, architect (Castle Hill)
- Marlon Brando, Academy Award–winning actor
- Julia Cameron, writer and artist, most famous for her book The Artist's Way
- Marietta DePrima, actress (The Hughleys)
- Bill Heck, actor
- Marissa Lingen, writer, born here.
- Mary Morello, co-founder of the anti-censorship group Parents for Rock and Rap
- Jim Naureckas, editor of Extra!, FAIR's bimonthly journal of media criticism
- Zak Orth, actor film and television
- Alicia Patterson, editor and publisher, founder of Newsday
- Cissy Patterson, publisher and countess
- George F. Pond, Civil War-era Medal of Honor recipient
- Gwynne Shotwell, President and Chief Operating Officer of SpaceX.
- Phillipa Soo, Actress originating the role of Elizabeth Schuyler in the Broadway musical Hamilton
- Mark Suppelsa, co-anchor of WGN-TV's 9:00 news
- Peter II of Yugoslavia, the only monarch to be buried on U.S. soil, was buried in Libertyville up to 2013, before his body's return to Serbia.

== See also ==
- Lambs Farm
- St. Sava's Serbian Orthodox Seminary and Monastery
