= Cook Memorial Public Library District =

- Established: 1921

Collection
- Size: 265,714

Access and use
- Circulation: 1.8 million
- Population served: 60,000

Other information
- Budget: $8,500,000
- Director: David Archer
- Website: www.cooklib.org

The Cook Memorial Public Library District (CMPLD) serves communities in Lake County, Illinois: Libertyville, Green Oaks, Vernon Hills, Indian Creek, Mettawa, and parts of Mundelein. There are two full-service library facilities: Cook Park Library, 413 N. Milwaukee Ave. in Libertyville, and Aspen Drive Library, 701 Aspen Drive in Vernon Hills. CMPLD is a member of the Reaching Across Illinois Library System (RAILS).

The former Cook Memorial Library building, in Cook Park at 413 N. Milwaukee Ave., Libertyville, Illinois, is a classical revival building constructed in 1879 as the home of area businessman Ansel Brainerd Cook; it is listed on the U.S. National Register of Historic Places.

== History ==
Local library service began in 1909 when the Alpha Club (now the Libertyville Woman’s Club) began a subscription library in Decker and Bond, a local drugstore. The small collection soon outgrew the few shelves in the drugstore and in 1914 found a new home in the Libertyville Village Hall. In 1921, the home and property of Ansel B. Cook were left to the village of Libertyville for library and park purposes; Cook Memorial Library opened to the public in November of that year. The first head librarian, Blanche Mitchell, lived with her husband in one of the upstairs rooms of Cook House.

In 1924, the Libertyville Township Library Board was organized to operate Cook Memorial Library, and library service continued to be offered to the community from the Cook House. As the library’s collection expanded to meet the demands of a growing population, the Children’s Department was moved offsite.

In 1968, a new 28,000 square feet (2,600 m^{2}) brick building was constructed behind the Cook House, bringing the collection back together in one facility. The township library board was dissolved in 1973 with the formation of the Cook Memorial Public Library District. Shortly thereafter, parts of northern Vernon Township were annexed into the library district. In 1974, an automated circulation system was installed. In 1984, the basement was expanded by 5,000 square feet (460 m^{2}) to house the Children’s Department, office space, and a public meeting room. Public internet stations were installed in 1995.

As the population served by CMPLD continued to grow, library space became crowded: By 1996, the library district’s population was more than 47,000 and its annual circulation was more than one million items. Three unsuccessful referendums left the southern part of the library district underserved. In 2002, then serving a population of more than 58,000, CMPLD entered into an agreement with Vernon Hills to rent space in the lower level of its Village Hall on Evergreen Drive. The Evergreen Interim Library, 2,800 square feet (260 m^{2}), opened on January 13, 2003.

To alleviate a continued lack of adequate space, in 2007 the CMPLD board adopted an expansion proposal calling for the addition of 30,000 square feet (2,800 m^{2}) to the district's facilities. The $14-million project called for the construction of a 20,000-square-foot (1,900 m^{2}) library on Aspen Drive in Vernon Hills and adding about 11,000 square feet (1,000 m^{2}) to Cook Park Library, along with renovating existing space at the site.

While the Cook Park site was being remodeled, a temporary library location was established in order to continue services and programming. The new Aspen Drive Library opened on July 10, 2010. The remodeled Cook Park Library reopened on January 8, 2011.

As of 2015, the Cook Memorial Public Library District was serving 60,000 people in Libertyville, Vernon Hills, Green Oaks, and Mundelein. The library district continues to operate two full-service libraries, a digital/eLibrary collection, as well as a Bookmobile, and Outreach.

=== Library Directors ===
- Verna E. Jarrett, June 1921 to December 1922
- Blanche A. Mitchell, January 1923 to October 1951
- Catherine Littler, November 1951 to March 1966
- William Sannwald, 1966 to 1968
- Frederick Byergo, September 1968 to April 2007
- Dan Armstrong, April 2007 to February 2010
- Mary Ellen Stembal (Acting Director), February 2010 to September 2010
- Stephen A. Kershner, September 2010 to June 2015
- David Archer, June 2015 to present

== Services ==
CMPLD offers a variety of free programming to patrons, including genealogy research support, morning and evening book discussions, English-language instruction, children's story times, reading clubs for children and adults, tween/teen get-togethers, computer classes, device assistance, and an extensive digital library including eBooks, audiobooks, films/videos, and music.

In 2014, Digital Studios were added to both libraries, offering patrons a variety of electronic equipment and space to scan, edit, and restore photos, slides, and negatives; convert VHS tapes to DVDs or digital files; design a website or app; record a demo; start a podcast; and more.

Via its website, www.cooklib.org, CMPLD provides patrons with 24/7 remote access to a range of reference databases (some in Spanish) that contain reliable, accurate, and detailed information on topics such as medicine, law, current events, investments, and genealogy.

CMPLD offers free lectures covering a variety of topics, from local history to American pop culture icons such as Star Trek and the Lone Ranger. The Library also hosts a visiting authors program that has included internationally bestselling writers such as Jodi Picoult, Chris Bohjalian, and Jeff Shaara, as well as debut authors and emerging talents such as Sara Levine, Rebecca Makkai, and CakeSpy blogger Jessie Oleson Moore.

A Bookmobile offering a variety of library materials makes regular stops in neighborhoods as well as at senior centers and daycare centers throughout the District.
