= Vernon Hills High School =

Coordinates: 42°13′41″N 87°57′3″W

Location
- 145 Lakeview Parkway; Vernon Hills, Illinois 60061; United States

Information
- School type: Public secondary
- Motto: Excellence Is Our Standard
- Established: 1999 (freshmen only); 2000 (all grades)
- School district: CHS District 128
- Principal: Andrew Young
- Faculty: 118.46 (FTE)
- Grades: 9–12
- Enrollment: 1,480 (2023-2024)
- Student to teacher ratio: 12.49
- Campus type: Suburban
- Colors: Royal blue Silver
- Athletics conference: Central Suburban League
- Mascot: Cody the Cougar
- Nickname: Cougars
- Newspaper: The Scratching Post
- Yearbook: Continuum
- Website: www.vhhscougars.org

Vernon Hills High School, or VHHS, is a public four-year high school located in Vernon Hills, Illinois, a northern suburb of Chicago, Illinois, in the United States. It is part of Community High School District 128, which also includes Libertyville High School. The school is a blue ribbon of excellence school.

== History ==
Following the successful passage of a $48.5 million bond referendum in 1997, construction on the school began. The doors opened on September 7, 1999 for all freshmen in District 128. Construction continued for the next year, upon which the school opened for all grades in August 2000. The school was formally dedicated on April 9, 2000. The first graduating class was that of 2002. The Cougar mascot was chosen following a poll of the freshmen and sophomore students attending the new school in August 2000.

== Academics ==
In 2022, Vernon Hills had a mean composite ACT score of 29. The average class size is 22. Vernon Hills has made Adequate Yearly Progress on the Prairie State Achievement Examination, a state test part of the No Child Left Behind Act.

The faculty consists of 111 teachers, of whom 97 hold a master's degree or beyond.

In 2009, Newsweek released a list of the best high schools in America. Vernon Hills High School was ranked 638th nationwide and 14th statewide.

In 2015, Vernon Hills was ranked as the 517th school nationwide, and 19th statewide, according to U.S. News & World Report. This was good enough to earn VHHS a Silver Medal of Excellence.

== Demographics ==
In 2022, the school had 38% minority enrollment: 21% Asian, 15% Hispanic, and 2% Black enrollment.

== Athletics ==
Vernon Hills competes in the Central Suburban League. Its mascot is Cody the Cougar.

Vernon Hills offers 31 Varsity Sports, 16 of which are male and 15 of which are female. The school has an on site pool for aquatics, as well as a baseball field and a football field, both of which were recently covered in field turf, allowing for optimal usage.

The VHHS football team has been solid especially for a relatively small school compared to local competition such as Stevenson High School. They typically have qualified for the state playoffs, or at least been close to qualifying. In the late 2000s and early 2010s, the team featured two future college stars: DaVaris Daniels, who went on to play for Notre Dame, and Evan Spencer, who went on to play for Ohio State. The team came close to making the state finals their senior year, losing to Kaneland in the Quarterfinals. This 2010 team shut out their opponents 310–0 to start off their season before a loss to Lake Forest.

The boys' bowling team has also been successful, placing 3rd in the state during the 2005–06 season. They have since won Sectionals in both 2008 and 2009 and placed 2nd in the state during the 2010–11 and 2011–12 season.

The 2007–08 Pom Pons team won a state championship in the TEAMDance Illinois Class AA Open Dance category. They defended their state title with additional wins in 2009, 2010, and 2011 for a total of 5 state titles.

The boys' volleyball team has been very successful within the North Suburban (Prairie) Conference. They have earned five conference championships, in 2003, 2008, 2009 (when they finished 10–0 in conference play), 2010 and co-champion 2011. They were the first team of any sport at VHHS to become back-to-back conference champions. In the 2009 season the bass fishing team of Mike Seal and Brandon Wolff qualified for the state championship during the IHSA bass fishing inaugural season.

In the 2010 and 2012 season the Girls' Track and Field team won their IHSA AA Sectional.

== Activities ==
=== Fine arts ===
==== Theatre ====
Vernon Hills High School's Backlight Theatre Company presents two plays, a musical, a freshman-sophomore play, and student-directed one acts each year.

==== Music ====
===== State competitions =====
The VHHS music department has always performed very well at the IHSA state competition, placing 4th in its class in its first year of existence. VHHS has placed within the top three schools in the state every year since 2004, and as of 2009 has placed first in the state in Class A for three consecutive years.

In 2006, 2009 and 2011, the VHHS Wind Ensemble was selected as the Class AA Honor Band at the University of Illinois at Urbana–Champaign–sponsored Superstate band competition, recognizing the VHHS Wind Ensemble as one of the top high school concert bands in Illinois.

=== FBLA ===
VHHS also sponsors one award-winning business club. FBLA sent five students to compete in the National Competition in Anaheim in the summer of 2009. FBLA has had students place in the top 10 of Accounting at the National level for two straight years (2008, 2009). DECA sent 13 state winners to the International Competition in Orlando. VHHS's DECA Financial Analysis team, which consisted of two freshmen, Sean Hogan and Jake Dinkel, placed 7th at the International Competition out of the over 150 teams competing in 2007. In 2014 Juniors Naren Akurati and Alexander Lao placed first in nationals with their PSA. Ryan Kang, Kevin Yoon, and Neel Choudhary placed 2nd in state for "Computer Game Simulation and Programming", advancing to 2016 Nationals in Atlanta. Also, one of DECA's written events by senior Cody Meltzer placed 8th at the competition in 2007.

=== Math Team ===
The Math Team earned a state championship in division 3AA at the 2008 ICTM State Math Competition, where all 13 VHHS teams placed within the top six in the state. Moya Chen placed first on the Algebra I test and VHHS took first place with its Algebra I, Geometry, and Algebra II teams. Also taking first place honors were the Frosh/Soph 8-person team and the Relay team of David Kim, Brynan Qiu, Parin Kadakia, Bryan Maldonado, and Paul Juhn.

In 2010, VHHS Math Team placed 3rd, after a strong performance from the Calculator Team of Rachel Wells, David Kim, Andrew Tung, Udit Nangia, and Parin Kadakia. Additionally, Sean Hogan placed 1st in the state for the pre-calculus competition. Last, but not least, Kenny Shaevel, placed 3rd in the oral competition, being the first Vernon Hills oralist to place in the top five.

In 2014, VHHS Math Team became a state champions in division 3AA. Standouts in the individual competition included Aakash Setty and the Freshman team who took second place, and Justin Yim and the Senior team who finished third overall. The Sophomore team had Ally Spence and Aiden Kang finishing in the top ten. The Junior/Senior 8-Person team placed first in State, the Frosh/Soph 8-Person placed second, and Calculator team placed fourth. Junior/Senior 2 Person team of Justin Yim and Eric Zhang qualified for the playoff round and finished first in State. The Frosh-Soph relay team of Aparajitha Adiraju, Kishore Iyer, Ari Bard and Ryan Curtis finished in 2nd place.

=== WYSE ===
The Worldwide Youth in Science and Engineering club at VHHS continues to be successful in their 1500 division. They have placed at the state level in many years past. A team of 14 students competes in the events of Math, Biology, Chemistry, English, and Physics, with each student taking two tests, and at least two students per each subject. The competition takes place at a regional, sectional, and state level. Regional and sectional levels are usually successful, and have resulted in first-place finishes. The team is coached by Joshua Ravenscraft, physics teacher, who has led the team for six years and Sarah Stoub, chemistry teacher. The WYSE team has placed within the top three schools in the state for seven of its eight years, and won its first state championship in 2009. Since 2018, WYSE was discontinued by the University of Illinois, but Eastern Illinois University continues to hold the competition. In their first season with EIU, VHHS placed 3rd at the state level in the 1500 division with Nicolas Beaumont, Alexa Pomerantz, Itamar Shifrin, Rachel Liu, and Jeffrey Zhang placing in the top five for biology, chemistry, computer science, English, mathematics and physics.

== Notable alumni ==
- DaVaris Daniels: Canadian Football League (CFL) wide receiver (graduated 2011)
- Evan Spencer: NFL wide receiver (graduated 2011)
- David Dobrik: Slovak-born YouTuber (graduated 2014)
- Andre Szmyt: Placekicker for the Cleveland Browns (graduated 2017)
