= Oak Grove School District 68 (Lake County, Illinois) =

School district in Illinois, United States

Coordinates: 42°18′8.1″N 87°54′49.3″W

Address
- 1700 O'Plaine Road Green Oaks, Illinois, 60048; United States

District information
- Superintendent: Dr. Bryan Zwemke

Other information
- Website: Official website

Oak Grove School District 68 is a school district in the central Lake County village of Green Oaks; it is located in the township of Libertyville. The district consists of a single school, Oak Grove School. Dr. Bryan Zwemke is the district's superintendent.

In September 2010, the school was identified by Chicago Magazine as third on the list of Best Elementary Schools in the Lake County. In years 2007, 2008, 2009 and 2010, Oak Grove School was identified in the top 5% of all Illinois Schools by Searchlight A+ Award for high student achievement as measured by Illinois Standards Achievement Test.
