= Evan Skoug =

American baseball player (born 1995)

- Catcher
- Born: October 21, 1995 (age 30); Kalamazoo, Michigan, U.S.
- Bats: Left Throws: Right
- Stats at Baseball Reference

Evan Nicholas Skoug (born October 21, 1995) is an American former professional baseball catcher. He attended Texas Christian University (TCU) and played college baseball for the TCU Horned Frogs, for whom he is currently an assistant coach. He played professional baseball in the Chicago White Sox organization from 2017 to 2023.

== Playing career ==
Skoug attended Libertyville High School in Libertyville, Illinois. Considered a potential second or third round pick in the MLB draft, Skoug wanted to go to college. He fell to the 34th round of the 2014 MLB draft, where he was selected by the Washington Nationals. Skoug did not sign, and enrolled at Texas Christian University (TCU). As a freshman for the TCU Horned Frogs, he batted .285 and led the team with 46 RBIs. He was named a Freshman All-American. After the 2015 season, he played collegiate summer baseball with the Falmouth Commodores of the Cape Cod Baseball League. In 2017, he struggled in his first 20 games of the season, batting below the Mendoza Line. After making adjustments to his swing, Skoug ended the season with 20 home runs. He was named Big 12 Conference Baseball Player of the Year.

The Chicago White Sox selected Skoug in the seventh round, with the 207th overall selection, of the 2017 MLB draft. Skoug signed with the White Sox, receiving a $300,000 signing bonus. After signing, he was assigned to the AZL White Sox, and after batting .529 with one home run and three RBIs in four games, was promoted to the Kannapolis Intimidators where he finished the season, posting a .154 batting average with two home runs and seven RBIs in 21 games. He returned to Kannapolis in 2018, batting .192 with five home runs and 31 RBIs in 83 games.

Skoug once again returned to Kannapolis to begin 2019. On the year, he played in 62 games split between Kannapolis and the High–A Winston-Salem Dash, hitting a cumulative .168/.284/.330 with 6 home runs and 24 RBI. Skoug did not play in a game in 2020 due to the cancellation of the minor league season because of the COVID-19 pandemic. He returned to action in 2021, spending the year in Winston-Salem, as well as playing in 3 games for the Triple–A Charlotte Knights. In 49 games for the Dash, he batted .175/.293/.364 with 7 home runs and 19 RBI.

Skoug began the 2022 season with the Double–A Birmingham Barons. He would go on to enjoy his best season yet, hitting .233/.369/.456 with a career–high 11 home runs and 25 RBI in 69 games played. In 2023, Skoug played in 43 games for Triple–A Charlotte, hitting .171/.299/.325 with 4 home runs and 15 RBI. On July 25, 2023, Skoug was released by the White Sox organization.

== Coaching career ==
On August 25, 2023, Skoug was announced as an assistant coach at his former school, Texas Christian University, for the upcoming season.

== Personal life ==
Skoug was born in Kalamazoo, Michigan. He has an older brother and older sister.
