= Horace Butler =

American politician

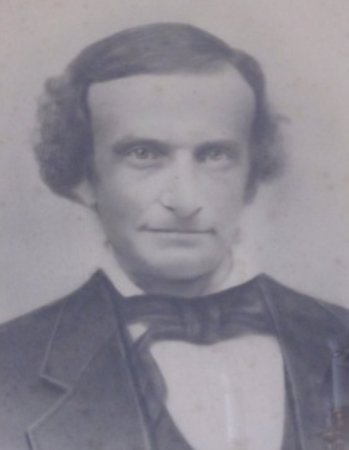

Member of the Illinois House of Representatives
- In office 1844–1846

Personal details
- Born: 1814 South Deerfield, New Hampshire
- Died: March 16, 1861 (aged 46–47) Libertyville, Illinois

Horace Butler was an American politician who served as a member of the Illinois House of Representatives.

== Biography ==
Butler was born in South Deerfield, New Hampshire. He moved to McHenry County, Illinois, in 1836 and then Libertyville, Illinois, in neighboring Lake County in 1839. He was one of the earliest lawyers in the county, serving as justice of the peace for 12 years and Probate Justice (1943–1945). He served as a state representative representing Lake County in the 14th Illinois General Assembly. He was a member of the Illinois Constitutional Convention of 1848; and later served as postmaster (1953–1961).

He died on March 16, 1861. His daughter was married to state legislator Ansel B. Cook.
