= Ansel B. Cook =

American politician

Member of the Illinois House of Representatives
- In office 1868–1870
- In office 1862–1866

Personal details
- Born: August 18, 1823 Haddam, Connecticut
- Died: June 10, 1898 (aged 74) Libertyville, Illinois

Ansel Brainerd Cook was an American politician who served as a member of the Illinois House of Representatives representing the 59th district in the 23rd and the 24th Illinois General Assemblies; and the 53rd district in the 26th Illinois General Assembly. His married the daughter of Illinois state representative Horace Butler.

His home, the Ansel B. Cook House, built in 1878, has been preserved as a museum in Libertyville, Illinois.
