= Ashraf Khalil =

Ashraf Khalil is a Washington, D.C.–based journalist and author of the critically acclaimed book Liberation Square: Inside the Egyptian Revolution and the Rebirth of a Nation, an account of the Egyptian Revolution of 2011 and the final few years of Hosni Mubarak's rule leading up to it. He currently works for the Associated Press, and in the past his freelance work has been published by Foreign Policy, The Times of London and Rolling Stone, among others.

An alumnus of Indiana University Bloomington, Khalil is a former Los Angeles Times correspondent in the Middle East. He served as editor-in-chief of the Cairo Times from 2001 to 2002, and his work has appeared in such publications as The Wall Street Journal, Chicago Tribune, The Boston Globe, San Francisco Chronicle and The Economist.

== Bibliography ==
- Khalil, A. Liberation Square: Inside the Egyptian Revolution and the Rebirth of a Nation, St. Martin's Press; First Edition (January 3, 2012); ISBN 9781250006691/ISBN 978-1250006691 (also ASIN 1250006694)
