= Green Oaks, Illinois =

- Village
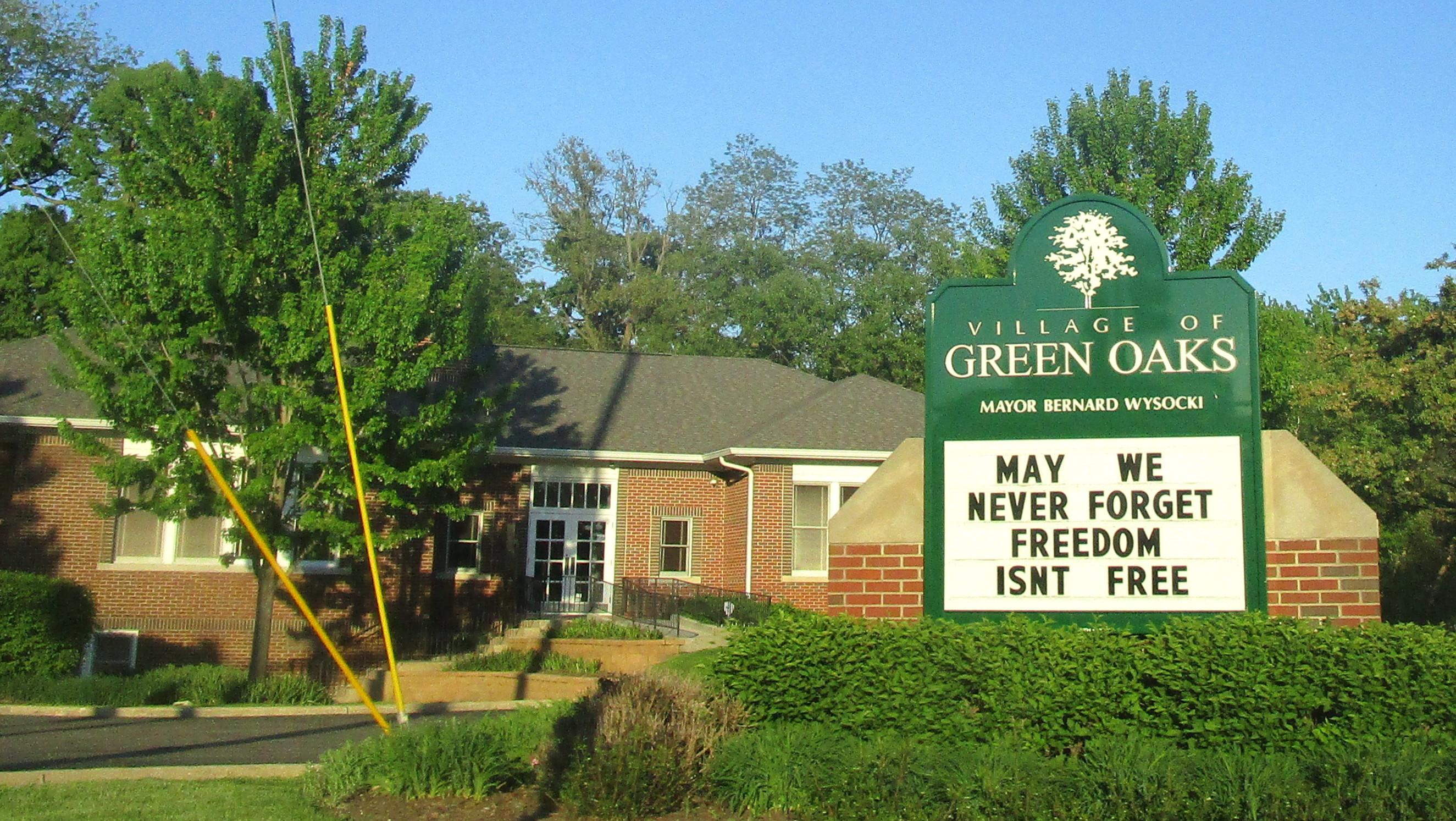
- Administrative offices

- Logo
- Motto: Community of Country Living
- Location of Green Oaks in Lake County, Illinois.
- Coordinates: 42°17′44″N 87°54′42″W
- Country: United States
- State: Illinois
- County: Lake
- Township: Libertyville

Area
  - Total: 4.10 sq mi (10.61 km^{2})
  - Land: 3.99 sq mi (10.34 km^{2})
  - Water: 0.10 sq mi (0.27 km^{2})
- Elevation: 689 ft (210 m)

Population (2020)
  - Total: 4,128
  - Density: 1,034.3/sq mi (399.36/km^{2})
- Time zone: UTC-6 (CST)
  - Summer (DST): UTC-5 (CDT)
- ZIP code: 60048
- Area code(s): 847, 224
- FIPS code: 17-31446
- GNIS feature ID: 2398202
- Website: www.greenoaks.org

Green Oaks is a village in Libertyville Township, Lake County, Illinois, United States. Per the 2020 census, the population was 4,128.

== Geography ==
According to the 2021 census gazetteer files, Green Oaks has a total area of 4.10 square miles (10.62 km^{2}), of which 3.99 square miles (10.33 km^{2}) (or 97.44%) is land and 0.11 square miles (0.28 km^{2}) (or 2.56%) is water.

=== Major streets ===
- Tri-State Tollway
- Buckley Road
- Park Avenue/Rockland Road
- O'Plaine Road
- St. Mary's Road
- Bradley Road
- Atkinson Road

=== Public schools serving Green Oaks ===
- Rondout School District 72
- Oak Grove School District 68
- Libertyville High School (District 128)

== Demographics ==
Historical population
Census	Pop.	Note	%±
1960	198		—
1970	659		232.8%
1980	1,415		114.7%
1990	2,101		48.5%
2000	3,572		70.0%
2010	3,866		8.2%
2020	4,128		6.8%
U.S. Decennial Census; 2010 2020

=== Racial and ethnic composition ===
Green Oaks village, Illinois – Racial and ethnic composition Note: the US Census treats Hispanic/Latino as an ethnic category. This table excludes Latinos from the racial categories and assigns them to a separate category. Hispanics/Latinos may be of any race.
Race / Ethnicity (NH = Non-Hispanic)	Pop 2000	Pop 2010	Pop 2020	% 2000	% 2010	% 2020
White alone (NH)	3,167	3,259	3,253	88.66%	84.30%	78.80%
Black or African American alone (NH)	61	53	41	1.71%	1.37%	0.99%
Native American or Alaska Native alone (NH)	5	2	2	0.14%	0.05%	0.05%
Asian alone (NH)	194	326	401	5.43%	8.43%	9.71%
Native Hawaiian or Pacific Islander alone (NH)	0	0	2	0.00%	0.00%	0.05%
Other race alone (NH)	4	2	11	0.11%	0.05%	0.27%
Mixed race or Multiracial (NH)	47	96	189	1.32%	2.48%	4.58%
Hispanic or Latino (any race)	94	128	229	2.63%	3.31%	5.55%
Total	3,572	3,866	4,128	100.00%	100.00%	100.00%

=== 2020 census ===
As of the 2020 census, Green Oaks had a population of 4,128. The median age was 46.2 years. 24.9% of residents were under the age of 18 and 20.6% were 65 years of age or older. For every 100 females there were 93.7 males, and for every 100 females age 18 and over there were 90.5 males.

99.9% of residents lived in urban areas, while 0.1% lived in rural areas.

There were 1,295 households and 996 families in Green Oaks, of which 40.5% had children under the age of 18 living in them. Of all households, 72.8% were married-couple households, 8.2% were households with a male householder and no spouse or partner present, and 17.1% were households with a female householder and no spouse or partner present. About 17.2% of all households were made up of individuals and 13.0% had someone living alone who was 65 years of age or older. The average household size was 3.25 and the average family size was 2.56.

There were 1,371 housing units, of which 5.5% were vacant. The homeowner vacancy rate was 1.7% and the rental vacancy rate was 6.9%. The population density was 1,007.81 inhabitants per square mile (389.12/km^{2}), and there were 1,371 housing units at an average density of 334.72 per square mile (129.24/km^{2}).

=== Income and poverty ===
The median income for a household in the village was $119,625, and the median income for a family was $211,250. Males had a median income of $106,719 versus $53,398 for females. The per capita income for the village was $71,496. About 4.0% of families and 6.3% of the population were below the poverty line, including 0.6% of those under age 18 and 8.6% of those age 65 or over.
