= The Evangelical Lutheran Good Samaritan Society =

Evangelical Lutheran Good Samaritan Society
- Formation: 1922
- Founder: Rev. August “Dad” Hoeger
- Type: Non-operating private foundation
- Purpose: Elderly Care, Healthcare, Care of Residents, Nursing, Rehabilitation
- Headquarters: Sioux Falls, South Dakota
- Region served: United States
- Key people: August “Dad” Hoeger
- Affiliations: Evangelical Lutheran Church in America (ELCA)
- Employees: over 24,000
- Website: http://www.good-sam.com

The Evangelical Lutheran Good Samaritan Society is the largest not-for-profit provider of senior housing and services in America. Headquartered in Sioux Falls, South Dakota, the society operates centers throughout the United States. The organization maintains an affiliation with the Evangelical Lutheran Church in America (ELCA).

The society’s founder, Reverend August “Dad” Hoeger, incorporated the society in 1922. The first home was opened in Arthur, North Dakota, on March 1, 1923. Since then, the society has grown to operate over 250 centers and employ more than 24,000 people.

== History ==
=== Founding ===
Hoeger worked as a pastor in North Dakota for several years in the early 1920s. During his tenure, the church undertook the task of raising money for a young boy in the parish who needed money to get to a hospital for treatment for his Polio. The donations raised $2,000 more than the boy needed to get treatment, so he suggested that the money go to help others with disabilities.

This $2,000 went to found the Evangelical Lutheran Good Samaritan Society, which was incorporated under the North Dakota state laws on September 29, 1922, as a religious, charitable, not-for-profit organization.

The first Good Samaritan Society center opened in Arthur, North Dakota, on March 1, 1923. It began as a center for mentally and physically disabled people and followed the principles of Christianity. Hoeger believed that the organization should take care of the “whole person, body, and soul".

=== 1920s through 1940s ===
The society continued to grow throughout the Great Depression, nearing the end of the 1930s with facilities in ten states and 27 different locations. Because of financial difficulties and a rift in philosophy within the society, the board of directors voted to split the society into two separate organizations: The Evangelical Lutheran Good Samaritan Society and Lutheran Hospitals and Homes Society of America (which would later rebrand as Banner Health). After the split, the society was left with only four facilities (Arthur, North Dakota; Ambrose, North Dakota; Sioux Falls, South Dakota; and Greeley, Colorado) as well as the debts of the entire organization.

=== Present day ===
After the division of the society, Hoeger paid off the large debt and began opening new facilities and expanding the services offered through the society. By 1952, the society was in seven states and ran 32 centers. Headquartered in Sioux Falls, South Dakota, the society currently operates more than 200 locations in 24 states and employs over 19,000 people who serve approximately 28,000 residents.

=== Merger ===
In 2018, the Society agreed to merge with Sanford Health. The merger was approved by regulators and became official January 1, 2019.
