= Clarissa C. Cook Library/Blue Ribbon News Building =

Historic building in Davenport, Iowa, US

- Clarissa C. Cook Library; Blue Ribbon News Building
- Formerly listed on the U.S. National Register of Historic Places
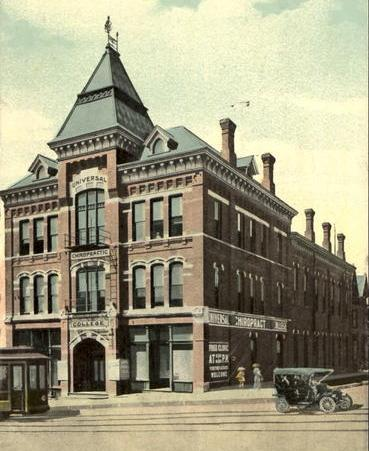

- Location within Iowa Location within the United States
- Location: 528 Brady Street; Davenport, Iowa
- Coordinates: 41°31′32″N 90°34′27″W
- Area: less than one acre
- Built: 1878
- Architect: B.W. Gartside
- Architectural style: Late Victorian
- MPS: Public Library Buildings in Iowa TR; Davenport MRA
- NRHP reference No.: 83004745

Significant dates
- Added to NRHP: July 7, 1983
- Removed from NRHP: December 19, 2014

Clarissa C. Cook Library/Blue Ribbon News Building was located at 528 Brady Street, Davenport, Iowa, United States. It was noted on the National Register of Historic Places in April, 1983 as Cook Memorial Library and listed in July 1983 under the "Clarissa C. Cook Library/Blue Ribbon News Bldg." name. It has subsequently been torn down, and was delisted from the National Register in 2014.

== Ebenezer and Clarissa Cook ==
Ebenezer Cook was born February 14, 1810, in Oneida County, New York to Ira and Rachel (Faxon) Cook. His younger brother was John Parsons Cook, and the two worked together their whole lives. Ebenezer bought 1,200 acres (4.9 km^{2}) of land in 1835 that would in time become part of the city of Davenport, and moved there with his extended family in 1836. He and his brother entered the legal profession and helped establish Scott County in what was then the Wisconsin Territory. They were joined in their law practice by John Forrest Dillon, who later became a judge of the United States Circuit Court for the Eighth Circuit. The brothers became involved in banking and set up a chain of private banks across Iowa and in Western Illinois until the country-wide panic which began in 1857. In 1851 the brothers were influential in routing the railroad through Davenport. Ebenezer became a director and then vice president of the Mississippi and Missouri Railroad when it was organized in 1853, and upon its subsequent consolidation became a director and later vice president of the Chicago, Rock Island and Pacific Railway. Prior to his death, the railway company was without a president and he looked after its operations. Ebenezer Cook died October 7, 1871.

Clarissa C. (Bryan) Cook was born August 4, 1811, in Sydney, Delaware County, New York and died February 19, 1879. She was a daughter of Fowler P. and Lucretia Bryan. Clarissa was known for carrying out the wishes of her husband and their philanthropy to the City of Davenport and the Episcopal Church. Through her generosity, both during her life and after her death, she was instrumental in building Trinity Church, a library, the Clarissa Cook Home for the Friendless and the establishment of a number of trusts for the benefit of the Episcopal parishes and activities in the Diocese of Iowa and elsewhere.

== Clarissa C. Cook Library ==
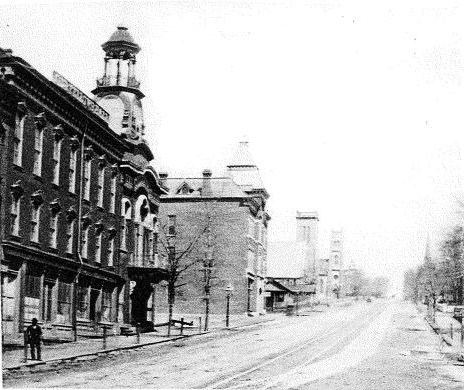
The Clarissa C. Cook Library is the third building on the left in this 1880 photograph.

The first library association in the city of Davenport was organized in April 1839 and called the Carey Library Association of the Town of Davenport. However, there is no mention of it after that date. There were other attempts at starting a library in the town, but finances were always a problem.

On July 6, 1877, Clarissa Cook contacted the Library Association, and offered to donate $10,000 for a library building. She stipulated that the property had to be bought by the people of Davenport. She donated the money in memory of her husband who had desired to establish a library in the town. He had bequeathed the money in his will to the existing library to be paid after his wife's death, however, Mrs. Cook decided to make the payment at this time.

On November 7, 1877, the cornerstone of the Cook Memorial Library was laid in a Masonic ceremony. Judge John Forrest Dillon delivered an address. Another $1,000 was needed to complete the building and it was paid for by Mrs. Cook. The new building was dedicated in July 1878.

The library suffered from poor finances as before and in January 1900 Andrew Carnegie, who had been an honorary member of the library board, offered $50,000 to build a public library. In May of that year the first board of public library trustees was named and a year later Carnegie upped his donation to $75,000. The new library was opened on the corner of Main and Fourth Streets in 1904 and the contents of the Cook library were moved to the new location.

== Blue Ribbon News ==
The Blue Ribbon News was a temperance newspaper with a Republican point of view that was founded in Davenport in 1878. Early publishers of the paper included Dr. J.B. Morgan, George W. Calderwood, and Solon H. Fidlar. Its investors sold the paper to E.W. Brady in 1879 and they renamed it the Northwestern News. The paper flourished in the 1880s and it changed its name again in 1886 to the Davenport Daily Times. In 1899 the Brady family sold the paper to A.W. Lee who published the Ottumwa Courier of Ottumwa, Iowa. This was the beginning of Lee Enterprises.
