= Libertyville Township, Illinois =

Libertyville Township
- Township
- Location in Lake County

- Lake County's location in Illinois
- Coordinates: 42°17′03″N 87°56′42″W
- Country: United States
- State: Illinois
- County: Lake
- Established: November 6, 1849

Government
  - Supervisor: Kathleen M. O'Connor

Area
  - Total: 36.52 sq mi (94.6 km^{2})
  - Land: 35.44 sq mi (91.8 km^{2})
  - Water: 1.08 sq mi (2.8 km^{2}) 2.97%
- Elevation: 659 ft (201 m)

Population (2020)
  - Total: 54,192
  - Density: 1,529/sq mi (590.4/km^{2})
- Time zone: UTC-6 (CST)
  - Summer (DST): UTC-5 (CDT)
- FIPS code: 17-097-43263
- Website: www.libertyvilletownship.us

Libertyville Township is a township in Lake County, Illinois, United States. As of the 2020 census, its population was 54,192. The village of Libertyville is part of the township, as are parts of Green Oaks, Lake Bluff, Lake Forest, Mettawa, Mundelein, North Chicago, Rondout, Vernon Hills and Waukegan.

== Geography ==
According to the 2021 census gazetteer files, Libertyville Township has a total area of 36.52 square miles (94.59 km^{2}), of which 35.44 square miles (91.79 km^{2}) (or 97.03%) is land and 1.08 square miles (2.80 km^{2}) (or 2.97%) is water. Lakes in this township include Big Bear Lake, Butler Lake, Harvey Lake, Liberty Lake, Little Bear Lake, Minear Lake and West Lake. The stream of Bull Creek runs through this township, before depositing into the Des Plaines River.

== Open space ==
In 1985, Libertyville Township established the first Township Open Space District in Illinois. This innovative land protection program was funded by a 22.6 million-dollar bond referendum approved by the residents of Libertyville Township. The Open Space Bond was retired fully paid in October 2003. Since land acquisition began in 1986, over 1,500 acres (6.1 km^{2}) of irreplaceable open space have been protected with these funds. Two of these sites, Oak Openings and Liberty Prairie, have also received the state's highest protection status as Illinois Nature Preserves.

=== Cities and towns ===
- Green Oaks
- Lake Forest (western edge)
- Libertyville
- Mettawa (northwest portion)
- Mundelein (eastern edge)
- North Chicago (western edge)
- Vernon Hills (northern half)
- Waukegan (western edge)

=== Census-designated place ===
- Knollwood (western edge)

=== Unincorporated towns ===
- Rondout

=== Adjacent townships ===
- Warren Township (north)
- Waukegan Township (northeast)
- Shields Township (east)
- West Deerfield Township (southeast)
- Vernon Township (south)
- Ela Township (southwest)
- Fremont Township (west)
- Avon Township (northwest)

=== Cemeteries ===
The township contains four cemeteries: Ascension, Lake County Poor Farm, Lakeside and the Serbian Monastery Cemetery.

=== Major highways ===
- Interstate 94
- U.S. Route 45
- Illinois State Route 21
- Illinois State Route 43
- Illinois State Route 60
- Illinois State Route 137
- Illinois State Route 176

=== Airports and landing strips ===
- Condell Memorial Hospital Heliport

== Demographics ==
As of the 2020 census there were 54,192 people, 19,657 households, and 13,950 families residing in the township. The population density was 1,483.90 inhabitants per square mile (572.94/km^{2}). There were 21,228 housing units at an average density of 581.27 per square mile (224.43/km^{2}). The racial makeup of the township was 68.85% White, 1.94% African American, 0.65% Native American, 11.73% Asian, 0.06% Pacific Islander, 7.86% from other races, and 8.91% from two or more races. Hispanic or Latino of any race were 16.37% of the population.

There were 19,657 households, out of which 34.40% had children under the age of 18 living with them, 60.70% were married couples living together, 7.47% had a female householder with no spouse present, and 29.03% were non-families. 24.10% of all households were made up of individuals, and 12.20% had someone living alone who was 65 years of age or older. The average household size was 2.68 and the average family size was 3.23.

The township's age distribution consisted of 24.8% under the age of 18, 7.7% from 18 to 24, 22.1% from 25 to 44, 29% from 45 to 64, and 16.3% who were 65 years of age or older. The median age was 41.6 years. For every 100 females, there were 100.6 males. For every 100 females age 18 and over, there were 102.3 males.

The median income for a household in the township was $107,412, and the median income for a family was $139,848. Males had a median income of $71,861 versus $45,333 for females. The per capita income for the township was $58,524. About 4.6% of families and 6.3% of the population were below the poverty line, including 8.4% of those under age 18 and 8.7% of those age 65 or over.

Historical population
| Census | Pop. | Note | %± |
|---|---|---|---|
| 2010 | 53,139 | | — |
| 2020 | 54,192 | | 2.0% |
U.S. Decennial Census

== Notable people ==
- Phil Collins, presidential nominee of the Prohibition Party
