= Community High School District 128 =

School district in Illinois, United States

Address
- 50 Lakeview Parkway, Suite 101 Vernon Hills, Illinois, 60061; United States

District information
- Grades: 9-12
- Superintendent: Raymond Lechner (Interim); Rebecca Nelson (Interim)
- Schools: Libertyville High School; Vernon Hills High School

Community High School District 128 is located in Lake County, Illinois. The district includes Libertyville High School and Vernon Hills High School.

== History ==
The Libertyville Township High School District was established in 1916; its Libertyville High School (LHS) was opened one year later. Libertyville Fremont Consolidated High School District 120 was established in 1949, but in 1963, a petition was filed to establish a high school district for the area served by LHS. The referendum was successful and LHS came under the jurisdiction of the new district and the Board of Education on July 1, 1964. The first superintendent of the new district was Walter Johnson. Under Johnson, additions to LHS's existing Butler Lake building were completed in 1971 and 1979. Johnson retired in 1980, and Dr. Donald Gossett was named superintendent. When he retired in 1998, Dr. David Clough was appointed as the new superintendent. In 1997, a referendum was passed to construct the new Vernon Hills campus, which opened to LHS freshmen in 1999 and officially became Vernon Hills High School in 2000. Dr. Clough retired in 2008 and was succeeded by Prentiss Lea.

Currently, the district serves students living within Green Oaks, Indian Creek, Libertyville, Mettawa, Mundelein, Rondout, Vernon Hills, and Waukegan.

== Achievements ==
Libertyville and Vernon Hills High Schools are both consistently recognized for their students' performance. Illinois State Board of Education data from the 2008-09 school year revealed that, out of the top 10-paying suburban high schools in the state, District 128 was the only district that met Adequate Yearly Progress. Additionally, Libertyville High School was ranked 3rd out of all suburban high schools for "students meeting and exceeding science standards." Overall, LHS and VHHS were ranked as the 5th and 18th, respectively, highest-performing suburban schools.

In December 2009, U.S. News & World Report named both LHS and VHHS in its annual rankings of America's Best High Schools for the third straight year. Both schools received silver medal status, and were two of only six high schools in Lake County to be honored in the rankings.

== Personnel ==
=== Administrative Staff ===
The superintendent's positions is being filled on an interim basis by:

- Raymond Lechner
- Rebecca Nelson

The permanent superintendent's position is intended to be filled by July 1, 2025 by Marc Schaffer, the superintendent of the Thompson School District in Northern Colorado.

=== Board of education ===
The 2024–2025 school board members are:

- Jim Batson, president
- Sonal Kulkarni, secretary
- Cara Benjamin
- Don Carmichael
- Kara Drumke
- Mithilesh Kotwal
- Lisa Hessel

=== Student Representatives ===
- Three student representatives from Libertyville High School
- Three student representatives from Vernon Hills High School

== See also ==
- Libertyville, Illinois
- Vernon Hills, Illinois
