= Hawthorn Community Consolidated School District 73 =

School district in Illinois, United States

Address
- 841 West End Court Vernon Hills, Illinois, 60061; United States

District information
- Grades: PreK-8
- Superintendent: Dr. Pete Hannigan

Other information
- Website: Official website

Hawthorn Community Consolidated School District 73 is a public school district located in Vernon Hills, Illinois, approximately 35 miles northwest of Chicago. It has approximately 3,937 students as of 2020 in grades Pre-Kindergarten through 8th grade in six schools spread across two campuses, the North Campus and the T.G. Oakson Campus.

== Schools at North Campus ==
- Hawthorn Elementary School North, opened in 1978
- Hawthorn Townline Elementary School, opened in 2005
- John Powers Center for the Hearing Impaired, part of the Special Education District of Lake County
- Hawthorn Middle School North - Opened in 1975, it originally housed Grades 6–8. From 1999 to 2005, it was known as Hawthorn Middle School and educated grades 5–6. Before that, it was known as Hawthorn Junior High School and housed grades 7–8, with 6th graders attending Half Day Middle School in unincorporated Prairie View.

== Schools at Oakson Campus ==
Oakson Campus refers to the schools on the south site of Route 60.

- Hawthorn Aspen Elementary School, opened in 1999
- Hawthorn Elementary School South, opened in 1938
- Hawthorn Middle School South - Opened in 1999 as the new Hawthorn Junior High School, housing all 7th and 8th grade students in the district. In 2005, the school became known as Hawthorn Middle School South and opened its doors to 6th, 7th, and 8th grade students living South of IL Rt. 60.
- Hawthorn School for Young Learners, opened in 2020

== History ==
As of 2011, Hawthorn Aspen Elementary School and Hawthorn Townline Elementary School offer a dual-language program in only Spanish. They are optional schools within the district. Children who do not attend these will not receive language learning until 7th grade. Children who attend these schools will be given an advanced Spanish course in 6th grade instead of a Writing course. By about 2012, while formerly a single classroom in each building, the dual language program since became its own cohesive building called the School of Dual Language, housed at Townline Elementary, which provides at least 50% of instruction in Spanish.

In 2012, the district piloted full-day kindergarten in two of its elementary schools, which previously had separate half-day morning and afternoon kindergarten classes. The district permanently began full-time kindergarten districtwide in the 2015-16 school year, along with other restructuring such as the elimination of the choice school system (except for the School of Dual Language).

In 2017, the district began working to expand the dual language program into middle schools, and the program is now located at the School of Dual Language for students in grades K-5, and at both Middle School North and Middle School South for students in grades 6-8.

In August 2020, the Hawthorn School for Young Learners opened, a new kindergarten building, taking students from all elementary schools except the School of Dual Language, and opened its doors to in-person students in January 2021.

After discussions beginning in April 2020, school hours for kindergarten and above were extended starting in the 2023-24 school year to 7 hours per day, from the previous 6 hours 15 minutes for elementary schoolers and 6 hours 30 minutes for middle schoolers.
