= Kathleen A. Ryg =

American politician

Member of the Illinois House of Representatives from the 59th district
- In office January 8, 2003 – September 12, 2009
- Preceded by: Susan Garrett
- Succeeded by: Carol Sente

Personal details
- Born: August 6, 1952 (age 74)
- Party: Democratic
- Spouse: Tom
- Education: Northern Illinois University, Roosevelt University

Kathleen Ann Ryg (born August 6, 1952) is a former Democratic member of the Illinois House of Representatives, representing the 59th district from 2003 until 2009. The district includes all or part of Vernon Hills, Prairie View, Long Grove, Buffalo Grove, Mettawa, Lake Forest, Lake Bluff, Green Oaks, Gurnee, Waukegan, Indian Creek, Lincolnshire, Mundelein, North Chicago, Park City, Riverwoods, Wheeling, and Northbrook.

Ryg served on the following House Committees: Appropriations-Human Services Disability Services, Chair Mass Transit Public Policy & Accountability Vehicles & Safety She was also a leader of the General Assembly and served as: Chair, Local Government Caucus Board of Directors/Secretary, Education Caucus Her legislative priorities included education, healthcare, and transportation.

Ryg has a Masters in Public Administration and a Masters of Arts in education from Roosevelt University and a Bachelor of Science in Family Services from Northern Illinois University. She is also a graduate of the Bowhay Institute for Legislative Leadership Development program.

Ryg resigned to rejoin the private sector on August 31, 2009. She was replaced by Carol Sente.
