= Carol Sente =

American politician (born 1961)

Member of the Illinois House of Representatives from the 59th district
- In office September 2009 – January 2019
- Preceded by: Kathleen Ryg
- Succeeded by: Daniel Didech

Personal details
- Born: July 10, 1961 (age 65)
- Party: Democratic
- Education: Indiana University; Northwestern University
- Profession: Architect; Business Executive

Carol Sente (born July 10, 1961) is a former Democratic member of the Illinois House of Representatives, representing the 59th Representative District from September 2009 until January 2019. The district includes all or part of Vernon Hills, Prairie View, Buffalo Grove, Green Oaks, Indian Creek, Lincolnshire, Mundelein, Riverwoods, and Wheeling.

Sente was appointed to the 59th District seat on September 12, 2009, after her predecessor, Kathleen A. Ryg, resigned to rejoin the private sector. On September 12, 2017, Sente announced her intention not to stand for reelection in 2018.
