= Daniel Didech =

American politician and attorney

Member of the Illinois House of Representatives from the 59th district
- Incumbent
- Assumed office January 9, 2019
- Preceded by: Carol Sente

Personal details
- Born: 1986 or 1987 (age 39–40) Buffalo Grove, Illinois, U.S.
- Party: Democratic
- Children: 2
- Education: Roosevelt University (BA); Valparaiso University (JD)
- Occupation: Attorney
- Website: www.repdidech.com

Daniel Calmon Didech (born 1986/1987) is an American attorney and politician serving as a Democratic member of the Illinois House of Representatives for the 59th district since 2019. The district, located in the Chicago metropolitan area, includes all or part of Vernon Hills, Prairie View, Buffalo Grove, Indian Creek, Lincolnshire, Mundelein, Riverwoods, and Wheeling.

Didech chairs the Illinois House Gaming Committee and, in 2026, gained national attention as the House sponsor of SB 315, the Artificial Intelligence Safety Measures Act. Signed into law by Governor JB Pritzker on July 6, 2026, the measure made Illinois the first state in the nation to require independent, third-party safety audits of the largest ("frontier") artificial intelligence systems, building on similar transparency laws enacted in California and New York.

== Early life and education ==
Didech was raised in Buffalo Grove, Illinois, by a family of small business owners and is a graduate of Stevenson High School. He earned a Bachelor of Arts in history from Roosevelt University in Chicago and a Juris Doctor from Valparaiso University Law School. While in law school, he worked at the Jewish Child & Family Services Legal Advocacy Center, in the workers' compensation bureau of the Office of the Illinois Attorney General, and at the Congressional Research Service in Washington, D.C.

== Career ==
Didech was elected Vernon Township Supervisor in 2017, serving from 2017 to 2019. In his first year as supervisor, he cut the township's property tax levy by more than five percent while expanding services, in part by championing the consolidation of the Vernon Township Road District.

Didech is chairman of the Lake County Democratic Party, having been elected to that role in 2026.

== Illinois House of Representatives ==
Didech was elected to the Illinois House in 2018, succeeding retiring Democratic Representative Carol Sente and defeating Republican Karen Feldman. He has since been reelected in 2020, 2022, and 2024.

=== Committee assignments ===
Didech has chaired the Illinois House Gaming Committee since 2023. In that role, he has been a leading advocate for combating problem gambling, serving as chief House sponsor of Senate Bill 2749, signed into law in 2026 to formally recognize gambling disorder as an addiction under the Illinois Substance Use Disorder Act and expand access to treatment, prevention, and public-awareness programs for compulsive gamblers and their families. In the 104th General Assembly, he also serves as vice-chairperson of the Cybersecurity, Data Analytics, & IT Committee and as sub-chairperson of the Commercial & Property Law and Teacher Policy & Research committees, in addition to sitting on the Financial Institutions & Licensing, Insurance, Judiciary–Civil, Revenue & Finance, and Elementary & Secondary Education: Administration, Licensing & Charter Schools committees.

=== Artificial intelligence safety legislation ===
In 2026, Didech served as the House sponsor of SB 315, the Artificial Intelligence Safety Measures Act. Modeled on 2025 laws in California (SB-53) and New York (the Responsible AI Safety and Education Act), the bill requires "large frontier" AI developers — those with more than $500 million in annual revenue whose models are trained using very large amounts of computing power — to publish safety frameworks addressing "catastrophic risk" and to undergo the nation's first mandatory independent third-party safety audits, rather than relying on self-certification alone.

The bill passed the Illinois Senate 52–5 and the Illinois House unanimously, 110–0, with support from OpenAI and Anthropic. Speaking on the House floor, Didech said the legislation "enacts critical protections against the most catastrophic risks that advanced AI systems pose to public safety." Governor Pritzker signed the bill into law on July 6, 2026.

=== Other legislation ===
Didech was chief House sponsor of SB 380, which created the Illinois Fertility Fraud Act, making it unlawful for a fertility health care provider to use their own reproductive material during treatment without a patient's informed consent and allowing victims to bring civil suits for damages.

Didech sponsored legislation, signed into law in 2021, requiring non-flushable products to carry "Do Not Flush" labeling after backup and clogging problems in a local sewer system.

Didech has been a leading advocate for protecting victims of domestic violence and sexual assault. He was chief House sponsor of HB 4394, which strengthens survivors' rights during police interviews by allowing them to request an officer of a particular sex or gender and to have a support person present, and of HB 1278, which guarantees employees who are victims of domestic violence, sexual violence, or gender violence access to evidence stored on employer-issued electronic devices and protects them from retaliation for using such devices to document abuse.

Didech was also chief sponsor of legislation adopting gender-neutral language in Illinois property law (Public Act 104-0040) and of HB 160 and HB 169, which amended the School Code to reduce administrative barriers for students observing religious holidays.

== Electoral history ==
Illinois 59th Representative District General Election, 2024
Party	Candidate	Votes	%
Democratic	Daniel Didech	26,927	63.59
Republican	Chris Henning	15,421	36.41
Total votes		42,348	100.0

Illinois 59th Representative District General Election, 2022
Party	Candidate	Votes	%
Democratic	Daniel Didech	20,619	66.48
Republican	Charles Roeske	10,398	33.52
Total votes		31,017	100.0

Illinois 59th Representative District General Election, 2020
Party	Candidate	Votes	%
Democratic	Daniel Didech (incumbent)	36,940	100.0
Total votes		36,940	100.0

Illinois 59th Representative District General Election, 2018
Party	Candidate	Votes	%
Democratic	Daniel Didech	22,038	61.34
Republican	Karen Feldman	13,891	38.66
Total votes		35,929	100.0

Illinois 59th Representative District Democratic Primary, 2018
Party	Candidate	Votes	%
Democratic	Daniel Didech	5,942	60.43
Democratic	Susan Malter	3,891	39.57
Total votes		9,833	100.0
