= Mike Rucinski =

Mike Ruchinski may refer to the following ice hockey players:

- Mike Rucinski (ice hockey, born 1963)
- Mike Rucinski (ice hockey, born 1975)
