= Indian Trails Public Library District =

Library in Illinois

- Location: 355 Schoenbeck Rd. Wheeling, Illinois
- Established: 1958

Collection
- Size: The library is a member of Cooperative Computer Services. CCS is a group of public libraries in the north and northwest suburbs of Chicago that share a database for circulation, acquisitions, cataloging, interlibrary loan and an online public access catalog. Over 5 million items are available to members through this collection.

Access and use
- Population served: 65,500 residents in the district includes Buffalo Grove, Prospect Heights, Wheeling

Other information
- Budget: $9,336,997 million
- Director: Brian D. Shepard
- Employees: 94
- Website: www.indiantrailslibrary.org

The Indian Trails Public Library District is a public library district located in Wheeling, Illinois, United States, serving 65,500 residents in Wheeling, Buffalo Grove, and Prospect Heights. The library also has a branch in Prospect Heights. Between July 1, 2023 – June 30, 2024, 337,377 people visited the Indian Trails Library and 1,036,004 items were loaned. The library hosted 1,417 programs that were attended by 31,477 people.

== History ==
=== 1950s ===
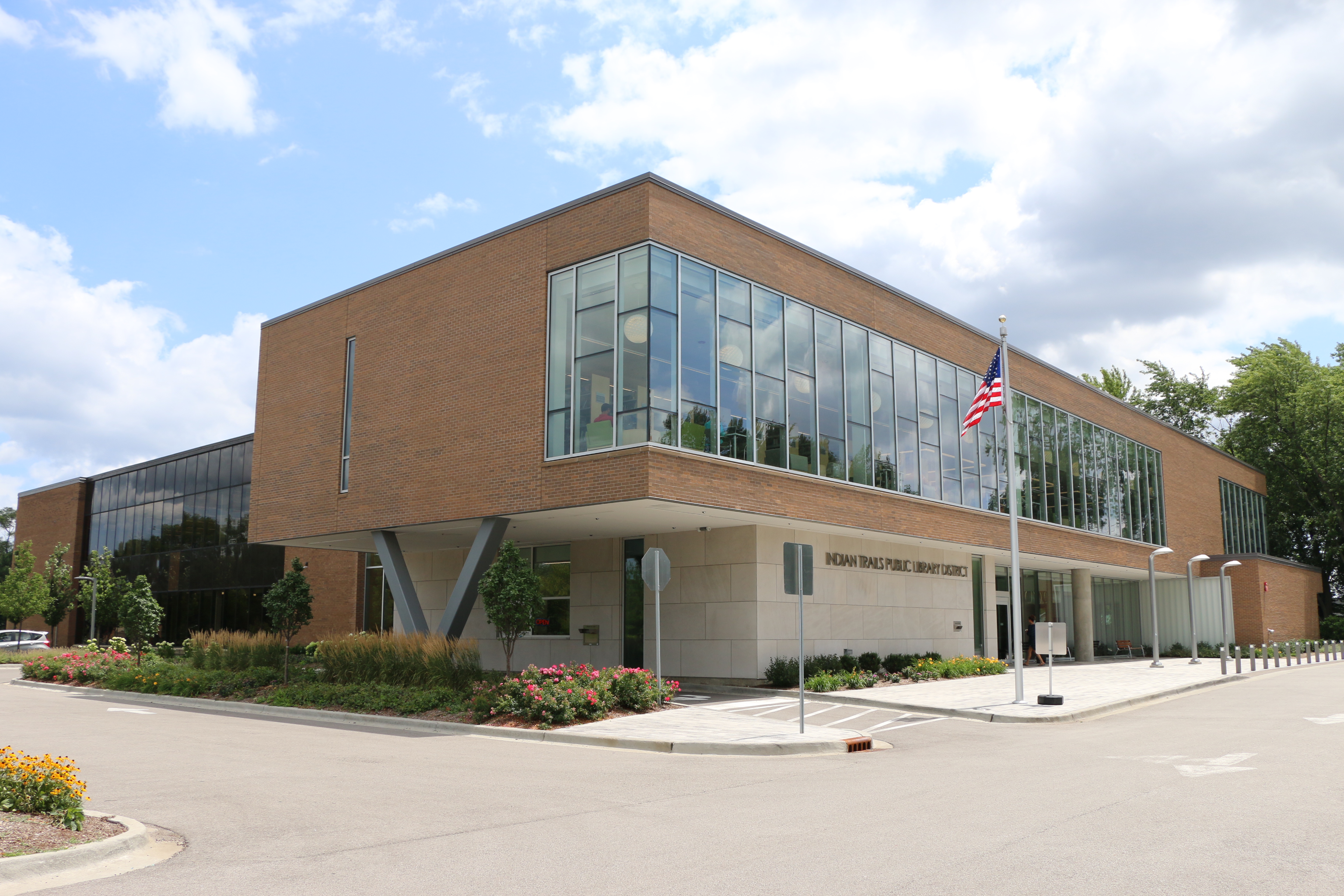
Main Library located at 355 Schoenbeck Rd., Wheeling, IL 60090

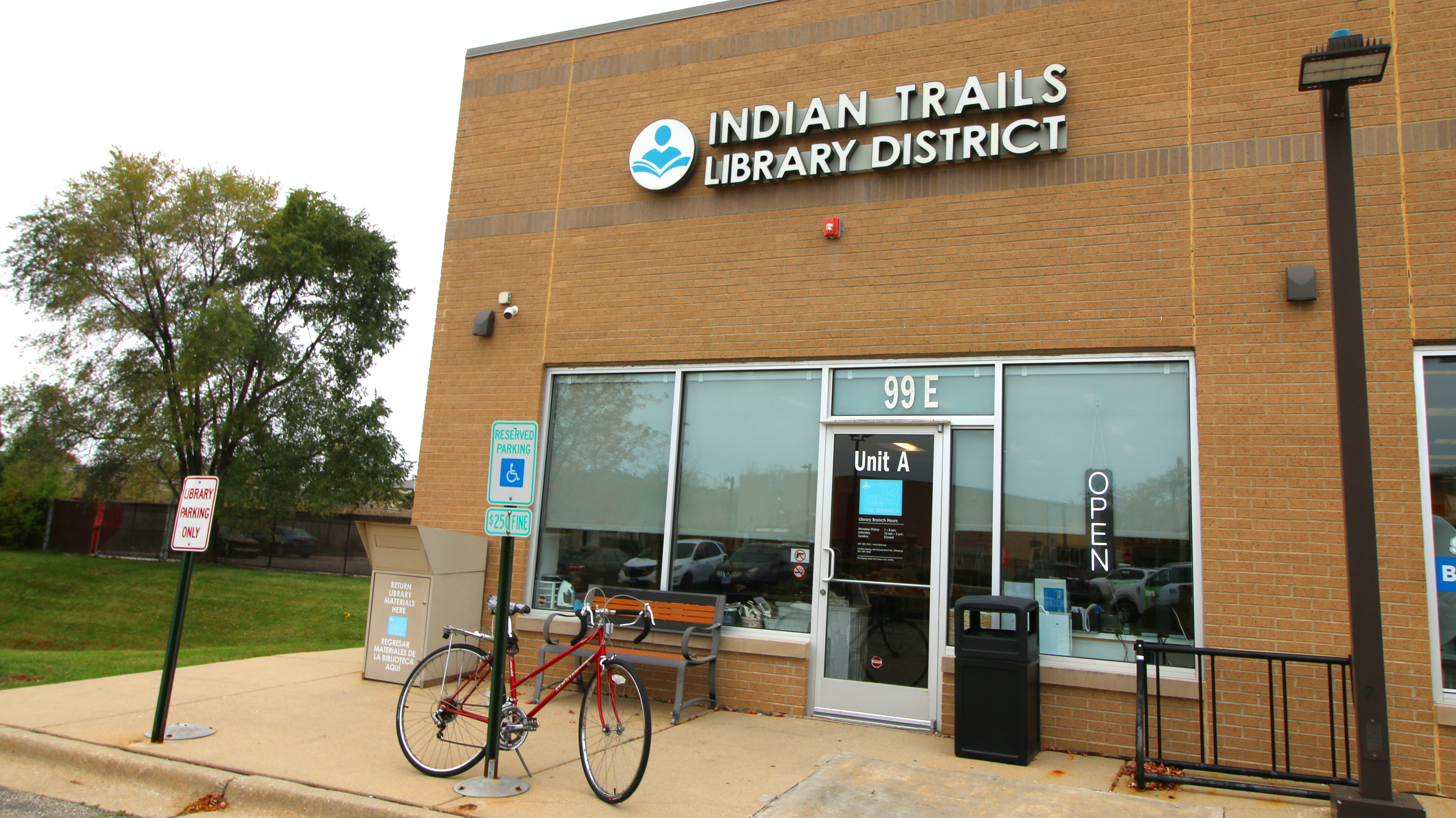
Branch located at 99 E. Palatine Rd., Prospect Heights, IL 60070

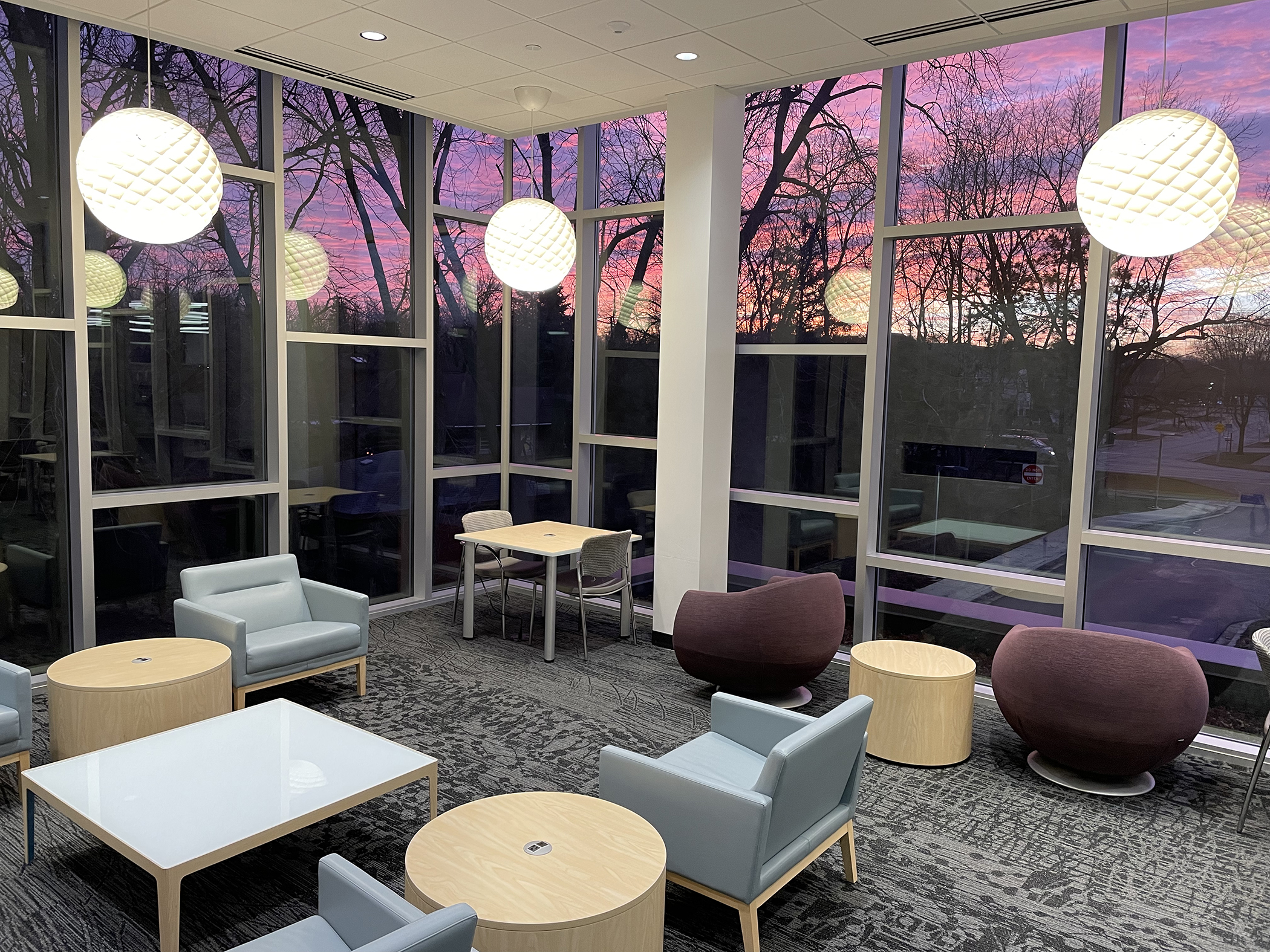
Adult Services reading room located on the second floor of the library.

In 1955, the Village of Wheeling was experiencing an explosion of population and affordable housing developments. A nucleus of mainly newcomers to the area, including the school superintendent, members of the Junior Woman’s Club, and the Junior Chamber of Commerce, formed a committee to investigate the feasibility of establishing a tax supported public library and following advice from the Assistant State Librarian, created a demonstration library for the public with the intent to run an official referendum soon thereafter.

On June 28, 1958, volunteers held "A Book and a Buck” drive, collecting more than 2,000 books and approximately $450 in donations. Advice and help with recording and cataloging the books was generously provided by Prospect Heights Library staff and the Woman’s Club of Prospect Heights who had very recently established the Prospect Heights Library District. The library's official opening day was October 13, 1958, with approximately 6,000 books available for circulation which included a donation from the State Library of 3000 books to commend the volunteers' hard work. Within a few weeks, 265 cards had been issued and 309 books had been checked out.

The boundary lines of the district to be served were, with minor variations, the Wheeling Township line on the east, Lake-Cook County line on the north, Arlington Heights Road south to Hintz, east to Wolf Road, south on Wolf to Palatine Road and east to the township line. The then smaller Village of Buffalo Grove and a section of Prospect Heights were included in the plan in order to create a larger tax base, with the combined population of the areas was only about 8,000 at that time. A special referendum to place the Library District on the tax rolls was held on March 28, 1959, and a concerted effort was made to bring out the vote, which resulted in an overwhelming victory, with 458 votes in favor and 62 against.

The first library board of seven trustees was elected on May 23, 1959. Volunteers continued to staff the library and operate with donated funds until tax monies should become available in the following year.

=== 1960s-1970s ===
In 1963, the library moved to a double storefront a block north from its original location. New library shelving, tables and chairs replaced the makeshift furnishings. Library hours were increased to 67 hours a week by 1964. The yearly budget was $21,200 and there were 12,725 books in the collection. With burgeoning increases in services and acquisitions at the Wheeling Public Library, and the advisability of locating more centrally in the service area became a critical issue, a referendum was held in April, 1970 for the purpose of acquiring an empty church building on Jenkins Court, near Elmhurst and Dundee Roads. The referendum passed and renovations were completed in June 1971. Library offices, Adult Services and Circulation were located on the first floor and the Children’s Department and Technical Services were on the lower level.

=== 1980s-1990s ===
In need of more space the library holds a building referendum, which fails to pass. The board of trustees decides to fund a new library building by means of a self-directed method of allowable financing. In 1981, the library moved to a new building of 30,900 square feet at 355 Schoenbeck Road. Kenneth Swanson retired from the library in October 1996, and Tamiye Meehan was selected to fill the position of Library Director. In 1998, the library reopens after a second construction phase with space for offices, bookshelves, and a computer lab, with an addition to the south of the 1981 building.

=== 2000s ===
A new garage was built at the rear of the building to accommodate the large Bookmobile acquired in 1979, replacing a small van which had been used for many years to bring book borrowing privileges to residents of outlying areas of the library district.

In 2009, Indian Trails started new construction at the front of the building. Shortly after the referendum's approval, the director who led the effort, Tom Simiele, resigned. His successor, Dave Seleb, left in April 2013 to take a similar job in Oak Park.

In 2013, The Indian Trails Library District Board of Trustees hired Brian Shepard as its new director, effective October 28, 2013.

=== 2016-2017 Renovation ===
In April 2016, the Indian Trails Library's Temporary Site opened at 70 W. Dundee Rd. to serve the public while the main library is closed for the 2016-2017 renovation.

Private study rooms, a computer lab, dedicated English as a Second Language classroom and expanded seating for programs are just four amenities planned for the Indian Trails Public Library when it begins renovations in early 2016. Nearly 15,000 square feet will be added for public use, increasing the size of the building to 61,000 square feet. Renovations are expected to be completed at the main library in April 2017.
