= American Hotel Register Company =

Manufacturer of hospitality industry products

- Type: Private
- Industry: hospitality products and services
- Founded: 1865
- Headquarters: Vernon Hills, Illinois, United States
- Key people: James F. (Jim) Leahy, Chairman
- Revenue: $500 million USD (2005)
- Number of employees: 900 (2017)
- Website: www.americanhotel.com

American Hotel Register Company is a manufacturer and supplier of hospitality products and services and is headquartered in Vernon Hills, Illinois.

== History and background ==
American Hotel was founded in 1865 as a publisher of hotel travel directories and railroad maps. It was incorporated in 1896 with its current name as a manufacturer of its patented hotel registers. Around the turn of the century it was acquired by Thomas F. Leahy. His son, James F. Leahy Sr. took over after his death in 1932. James expanded the company from a printing company to a direct marketing, catalog company selling hotel specific products like luggage carts & racks as well as maids carts. By the time of James Sr.'s death in 1986, his three sons, James Jr., Thomas, and Patrick had started growing the business from a direct marketing company to a full distribution, service based organization. By the end of the century they had 10 different distribution centers around the country and in Hawaii. American Hotel Register is now a full service distribution company that services all aspects of the hospitality industry. They have also expanded into government, healthcare, funeral, and higher education markets over the last 10 years. For many years, American Hotel was located in Northbrook, IL next to the (now former) Glenview Naval Air Base, but by the late 1990s had outgrown this location, prompting them to move to a larger facility in Vernon Hills, IL, where they have been located since 1998. Today, American Hotel is the parent company of International Hotel Supply. The company also operates aBundle.com, which caters to the growing vacation rental market.

In 2021 Consolidated Hospitality Supplies Holdings (CHS), a consolidation platform backed by HCI Equity Partners, has acquired the inventory and select North American operating assets of American Hotel Register Company (American Hotel), including American Hotel's Registry brand.

In 2026, Pacific Lodging Supply/PACTEX acquired certain inventory and select North American operating assets of American Hotel Register Company, including its Registry brand.
