= Hawthorn Mall =

Shopping mall in Vernon Hills, Illinois

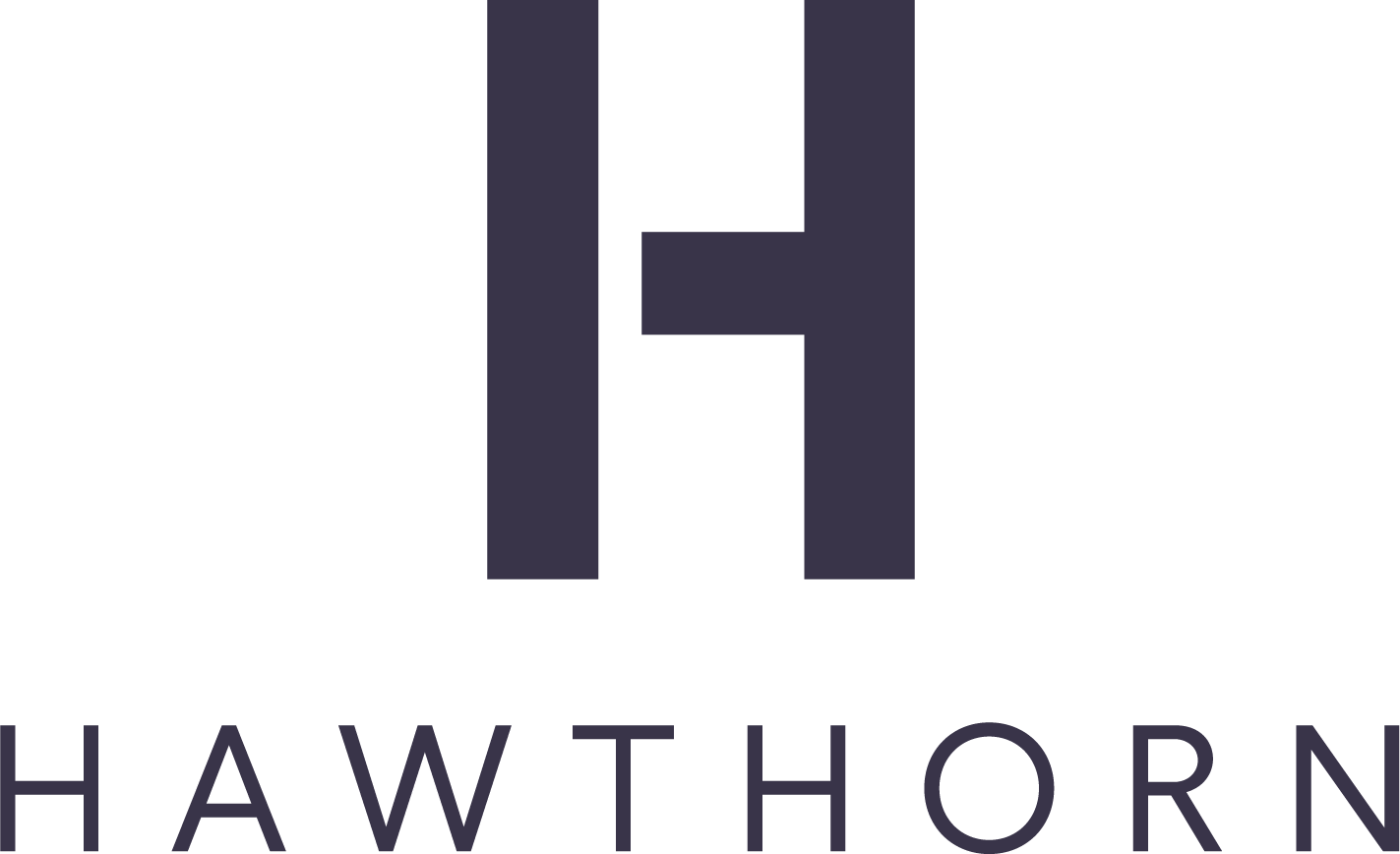
- The redesigned Hawthorn Mall logo for the Hawthorn 2.0 era.
- Location: Vernon Hills, Illinois, United States
- Coordinates: 42°14′34″N 87°57′0″W
- Address: 122 Hawthorn Center
- Opened: September 10, 1973; 53 years ago
- Previous names: Hawthorn Center (1973–2002); Westfield Shoppingtown Hawthorn (2002–2005); Westfield Hawthorn (2005–2015)
- Developer: Urban Investment and Development and Mafco
- Manager: Centennial Real Estate
- Owner: Centennial Real Estate; Montgomery Street Partners; USAA Real Estate; Unibail-Rodamco-Westfield
- Architect: Loebl, Schlossman, Bennett & Dart
- Num. of stores: 79 as of 1/21/2026
- Num. of anchor tenants: 4
- Floor area: 1,295,915 square feet (120,394.4 m^{2})
- Floors: 2 (3 in Macy's)
- Public transit: Pace
- Website: shophawthornmall.com

Hawthorn Mall (formerly Westfield Hawthorn) is a shopping mall in Vernon Hills, Illinois. It was developed by Urban Investment and Development Co, and anchor stores Sears and Marshall Field's (now Macy's) as part of New Century Town, a community with 5,000 condominiums and townhomes planned at the time. The mall features JCPenney and Macy's, in addition to a Dave & Buster's and a 12-screen AMC Theatres.

== History ==
Construction of the mall began in May 1972 and was completed at a cost of $45 million. On September 10, 1973, the first stores had their grand opening – Marshall Field's, Sears, and fifteen specialty shops. Hawthorn Center was a joint-venture between the Urban Investment and Development Company and Mafco which is a subsidiary of Marshall Field's. The Lord & Taylor store would open on August 11, 1975. Hawthorn was originally constructed without a food court. In 1990, Lord & Taylor sold its store to Carson Pirie Scott. In 1997, more stores began to come into the mall, including Barnes & Noble and JCPenney, which was constructed on the north end of the mall to replace the shuttered location at the failing Lakehurst Mall in Waukegan. In 1999, Holiday Inn Express opened outside the mall.

The mall was acquired by Westfield Group in 2002. Dave & Buster's opened on March 26, 2014. Maggiano's Little Italy opened on July 21, 2014. AMC Theatres opened in the spring of 2015. Westfield Group sold its 80% interest in the mall as of December 2015. Anchor stores include JCPenney, Macy's, AMC Theatres, and Dave & Buster's. On April 18, 2018, it was announced Carson's and Carson's Furniture Gallery would close, after their parent company went out of business. The store closed in August 2018. On May 31, 2018, it was announced that the Sears anchor store would close. In January 2021, the Sears and Carson's anchor stores were demolished for construction of new "main street" development with apartments and restaurants.

== Anchors ==
=== Current ===
- JCPenney — Opened in 1997
- Macy's — Opened in 2006
- Dave & Buster's — Opened in 2014
- AMC Theatres — Opened in 2015
- Barbara's Bookstore -- Opened in 2019 (Unofficial Anchor)

=== Former ===
- Marshall Field's — Opened in 1973, converted to Macy's in 2006
- Sears — Opened in 1973, closed in 2018, building was demolished in 2021
- Lord & Taylor — Opened in 1975, closed in 1990, replaced by Carson's
- Carson Pirie Scott — Opened in 1991, closed in 2018, building was demolished in 2022
- Barnes & Noble — Opened in October 1995, closed in 2018 (Unofficial Anchor)

== Bus routes ==
Pace

- 272 Milwaukee Avenue North
- 574 CLC/Hawthorn Mall
