= Cole-Parmer =

Medical and environmental products company

Cole-Parmer Instrument Company, LLC.
- Company type: LLC
- Industry: Laboratory instrumentation, equipment and supplies, Biopharma, Environmental, Fluid Handling, Academia & Research
- Founded: 1955
- Headquarters: Vernon Hills, Illinois
- Key people: Hermes González-Bello (CEO); Ashish Nanda (President & GM)
- Products: Circulation baths; Pipettes and pipettors; Burettes; Calorimeters; Centrifuges; Chromatography products; Electrophoresis products; Electroporation products; Flame photometers; Freeze dryers; Histology products; Refractometers; Thermal cyclers; Titrators; Ultrasonic cleaners; Water purification products
- Website: coleparmer.com

Cole-Parmer Instrument Company, is a Company founded in 1955. The company serves professionals in biopharma, environmental and life sciences.

== History ==
The company was founded by Jerry Cole and John Parmer in 1955 and took up shop in a 1,200-square-foot (110 m^{2}) loft on West Illinois Street in downtown Chicago. In the 1960s, Cole-Parmer acquired Masterflex peristaltic pumps, followed shortly by the purchases of Gilmont Instruments and Manostat Pumps.

They were acquired by Fisher Scientific, now Thermo-Fisher Scientific, in 2001.

On July 17, 2014, Thermo Fisher Scientific Inc. agreed to sell one of its lab units, Cole-Parmer, to private-equity firm GTCR for $480 million in cash. The company has previously said its $13.6 billion acquisition of Life Technologies Corp. would allow it to cut costs while gaining from next-generation genetic-sequencing machines. It has also sought to expand in Asia-Pacific markets.

In 2025, Cole-Parmer was sold to Brookfield Asset Management Ltd.'s private equity group and Caisse de dépôt et placement du Québec for a reported 1.4 billion dollars (USD).

== Product offering ==
Cole-Parmer offers a variety of lab products. Many of their products are related to research and process. Cole-Parmer also offers calibration and instrument repairs through InnoCal.
