= Mike Rucinski (ice hockey, born 1963) =

American ice hockey player

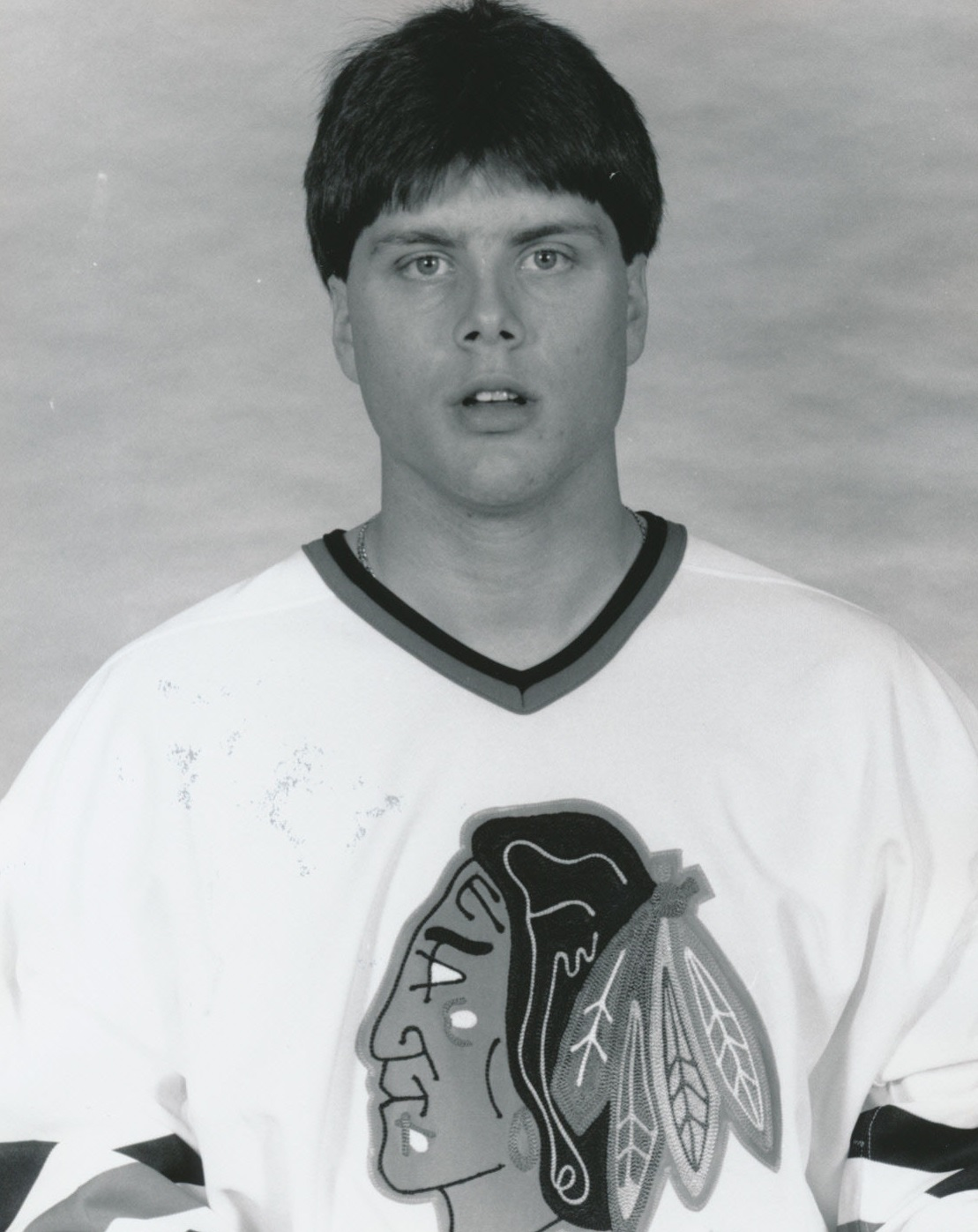
- Rucinski in 1988
- Born: December 12, 1963 (age 61); Wheeling, Illinois, U.S.
- Height: 5 ft 10 in (178 cm)
- Weight: 180 lb (82 kg; 12 st 12 lb)
- Position: Center
- Shot: Left
- Played for: Chicago Blackhawks
- Playing career: 1983–1990

Michael S. Rucinski (born December 12, 1963) is an American retired professional ice hockey center who played in the National Hockey League for the Chicago Blackhawks.

== Career ==
Rucinski played one regular season and two post season games for the Chicago Blackhawks. He was also a member of the Salt Lake Golden Eagles, Saginaw Hawks, and Indianapolis Ice of the International Hockey League.

== Career statistics ==
			Regular season					Playoffs
Season	Team	League	GP	G	A	Pts	PIM	GP	G	A	Pts	PIM
1982–83	Chicago Jets	CJHL	37	82	73	155	26	13	21	15	36	—
1983–84	University of Illinois at Chicago	NCAA	33	17	26	43	12	—	—	—	—	—
1984–85	University of Illinois at Chicago	NCAA	40	29	32	61	28	—	—	—	—	—
1985–86	University of Illinois at Chicago	NCAA	37	16	31	47	18	—	—	—	—	—
1986–87	Salt Lake Golden Eagles	IHL	28	16	25	41	19	17	9	18	27	28
1986–87	Moncton Golden Flames	AHL	42	5	9	14	14	—	—	—	—	—
1987–88	Saginaw Hawks	IHL	44	19	31	50	32	10	1	9	10	10
1987–88	Chicago Blackhawks	NHL	—	—	—	—	—	2	0	0	0	0
1988–89	Chicago Blackhawks	NHL	1	0	0	0	0	—	—	—	—	—
1988–89	Saginaw Hawks	IHL	81	35	72	107	40	6	2	4	6	14
1989–90	Indianapolis Ice	IHL	80	28	41	69	27	13	3	8	11	8
NHL totals			1	0	0	0	0	2	0	0	0	0
IHL totals			233	98	169	267	118	46	15	39	54	60
