= Wheeling, Illinois =

- Village
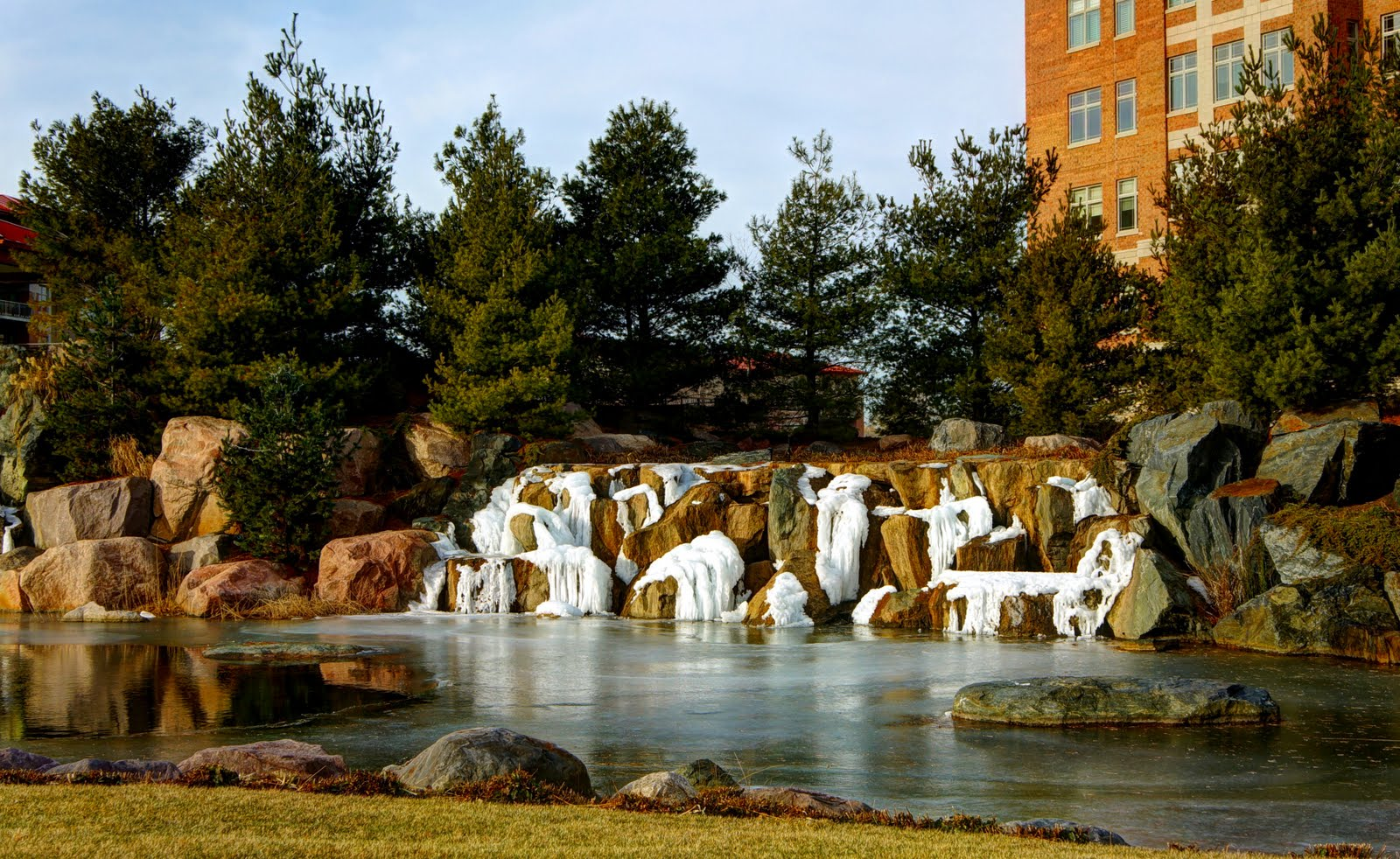
- Pond on North Wolf Road

- Flag Seal
- Motto: "Revolving Around Community"
- Interactive map of Wheeling, Illinois
- Location within Greater Chicago Location within Illinois Location within the United States
- Coordinates: 42°07′25″N 87°55′15″W
- Country: United States
- State: Illinois
- Counties: Cook and Lake
- Townships: Wheeling and Vernon
- Founded: 1894

Government
  - Type: Council-manager
  - Village President: Patrick Horcher
  - Village Board: Trustees: Mary Krueger; Ray Lang; Mary Papantos; Jim Ruffatto; Joe Vito; David Vogel

Area
  - Total: 8.73 sq mi (22.61 km^{2})
  - Land: 8.67 sq mi (22.46 km^{2})
  - Water: 0.058 sq mi (0.15 km^{2})
- Elevation: 650 ft (200 m)

Population (2020)
  - Total: 39,137
  - Density: 4,513.0/sq mi (1,742.46/km^{2})
- Time zone: UTC−6 (CST)
  - Summer (DST): UTC−5 (CDT)
- ZIP Code(s): 60089, 60090
- Area codes: 847 and 224
- FIPS code: 17-81087
- Website: www.wheelingil.gov

Wheeling is a village in Cook and Lake counties in the U.S. state of Illinois. It is part of Wheeling and Vernon townships. Wheeling is a suburb of Chicago, it is primarily in Cook County, approximately 23 miles (37 km) northwest of downtown Chicago. The population was 39,137 at the 2020 census. Wheeling is named after Wheeling, West Virginia.

== History ==
=== Prior to incorporation ===
The land that is now Wheeling, Illinois, was controlled by the Miami Confederacy (which contained the Illini and Kickapoo tribes) starting in the early 1680s. The Confederacy was driven from the area by the Iroquois and Meskwaki in the early 1700s. The French-allied Potawatomi began to raid and take possession of Northern Illinois in the 1700s. In the late 1700s and early 1800s, the Potawatomi expanded southwards from their territory in Green Bay and westward from their holdings in Detroit, until they controlled in an L-shaped swath of territory from Green Bay to the Illinois River, and from the Mississippi River to the Maumee River. The descendants of the Potawatomi who once inhabited the land that is now Wheeling currently live on a reservation in Mayette, Kansas.

The first cabin in Wheeling Township was built by a Mr. Sweet in March of 1833. He became the first settler and was able to live peacefully alongside the neighboring Native Americans. The following September, Mr. Sweet sold the cabin to George Strong for $60, making Mr. Strong the first permanent resident in Wheeling Township. In 1834, Mr. Strong purchased 160 acres of land from the government for $200. Today, Strong Street is named after him.

In 1834, Joseph Filkins opened the first tavern-hotel in the township at the intersection of Dundee Road and Milwaukee Avenue. Joseph Filkins was also the owner of a 720 acre farm in Wheeling and he spent 15 years living in Wheeling. He laid down roads and served as postmaster, supervisor of Wheeling Township, and as the Justice of Peace. He worked alongside George Strong to help settle land claim disputes. By 1835, there were 18 cabins in the township, and a post office was established in Filkins' Tavern.

In 1837, Russell Wheeler and Charles Daniels opened a general store and trading post next to Filkins' Tavern. The settlers who migrated to that area formed the Village of East Wheeling, which later became known as simply Wheeling. In 1845, Wheeling built its first ever school and was named The Wheeling School. Due to a growing population in Wheeling, a new school was built in 1861 which burned and was destroyed in 1870. In 1850, Napoleon Periolat built Wheeling’s first ever industry, a brewery which lasted until 1910.

In 1886, Wheeling built its first railroad station. The railroad station wasn't part of Wheeling until the land was purchased by residents in the area. The Old Wheeling Station was part of the Soo Line and only freight trains travelled through. This forced Wheeling residents to hop on milk trains to get to Chicago and back.

=== Incorporation and post-incorporation ===
On June 18, 1894, Wheeling was incorporated as a village through a special election held at the Union Hotel. Forty-three people voted in favor and three voted against. On July 18, 1894, another election was held to officially elect a Village President, six trustees, a Police Magistrate, and a Village Clerk. Incorporation was needed to enforce existing ordinances and control illegal activities. Wheeling was struggling to control railroad workers who would go to taverns and drink. By incorporating, they were able to arrest them until they sobered up.

In 1894, the first Village Hall was built. It contained two jail cells and was used by both the Chief of Police and Chief Magistrate. it also served as the only polling place in the village and was where the Village Board met on the first Monday of each month. The original Village Hall is now the Wheeling Historical Museum located in Chamber Park.

In the 1920s and 1930s, Wheeling had dairy farms like the Buffalo Creek Farm, which supplied milk to restaurants and residents of Wheeling. There was truck farms where vegetables were grown and later sold to markets in Chicago. Spanish-speaking migrants from Texas and Mexico would come and work on the truck farms in Wheeling during the Spring and Summer seasons. Many would go back to their homes when the farming season was over, but some decided to stay year round.

In 1970, the Village of Wheeling became a Council-Manager type of government. Currently, Wheeling has a Village President, six trustees, a Village Clerk, and a Village Manager. The Village is a home-rule community, which allows the Village to make its own laws and carry out its responsibilities.

In 2025, Wheeling introduced a new flag design to mark a new chapter in the village. The previous flag design was used from 1972 to 2025.

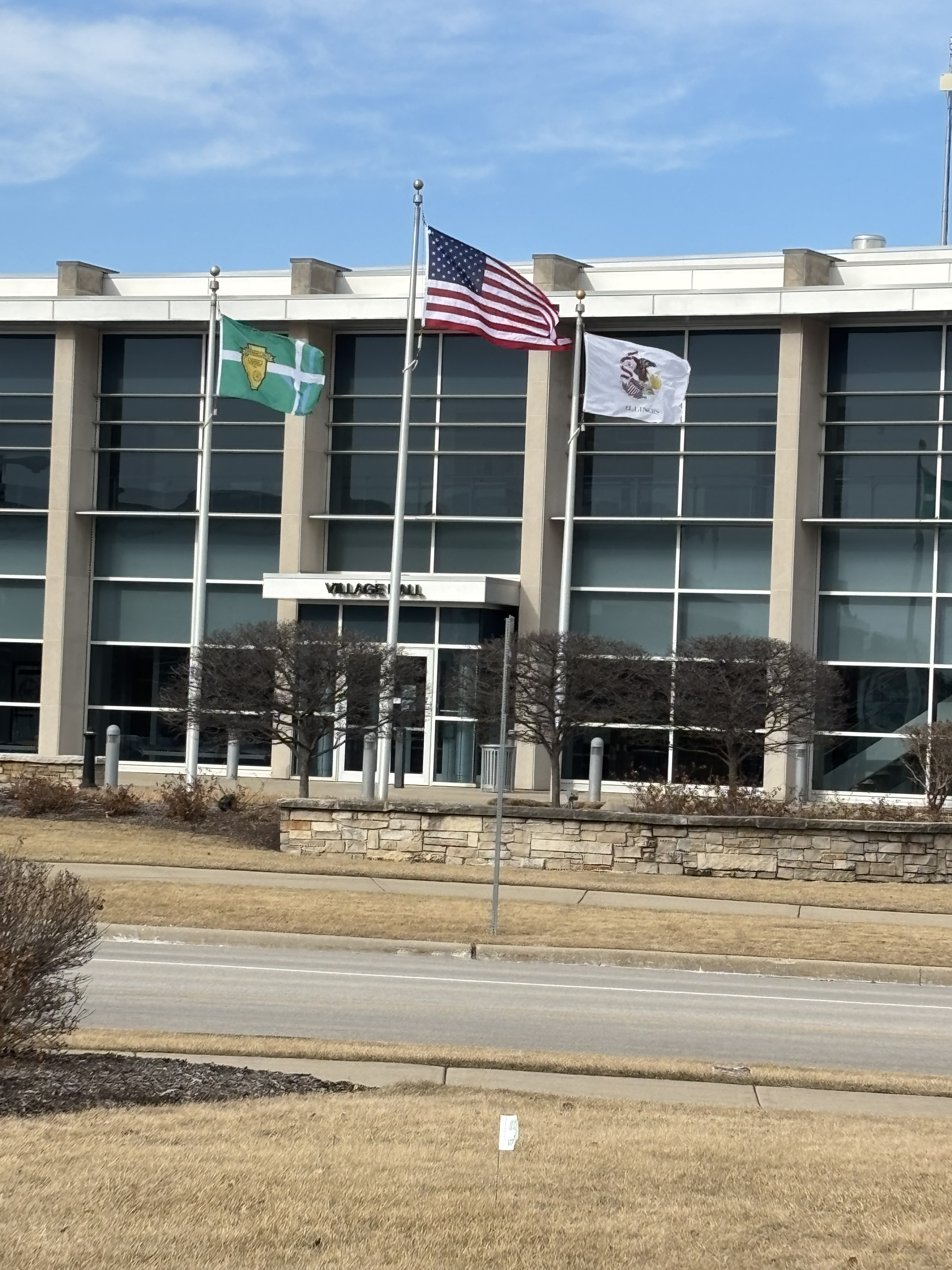
Wheeling Town Hall before flag change

== Geography ==
According to the 2010 census, the village has a total area of 8.74 square miles (22.6 km^{2}), of which 8.74 square miles (22.6 km^{2}) (or 97.26%) is land and 0.24 square miles (0.62 km^{2}) (or 2.74%) is water.

=== Climate ===
The climate in Wheeling can be classified as temperate. Winters are usually very cold and snowy. Summers are often hot and humid, but can be pleasantly warm as well. Precipitation is uniformly distributed throughout the year.

Climate data for Wheeling, Illinois
Month	Jan	Feb	Mar	Apr	May	Jun	Jul	Aug	Sep	Oct	Nov	Dec	Year
Mean daily maximum °F (°C)	32 (0)	36 (2)	45 (7)	57 (14)	68 (20)	78 (26)	83 (28)	81 (27)	74 (23)	62 (17)	49 (9)	36 (2)	58.416 (14.68)
Mean daily minimum °F (°C)	16 (−9)	19 (−7)	28 (−2)	38 (3)	47 (8)	57 (14)	63 (17)	62 (17)	54 (12)	42 (6)	33 (1)	20 (−7)	36.916 (2.73)

== Demographics ==
Historical population
Census	Pop.	Note	%±
1890	811		—
1900	331		−59.2%
1910	260		−21.5%
1920	313		20.4%
1930	467		49.2%
1940	550		17.8%
1950	916		66.5%
1960	7,169		682.6%
1970	13,243		84.7%
1980	23,266		75.7%
1990	29,911		28.6%
2000	34,496		15.3%
2010	37,648		9.1%
2020	39,137		4.0%
U.S. Decennial Census; 2010 2020

=== Racial and ethnic composition ===
Wheeling village, Illinois – Racial and ethnic composition Note: the US Census treats Hispanic/Latino as an ethnic category. This table excludes Latinos from the racial categories and assigns them to a separate category. Hispanics/Latinos may be of any race.
Race / Ethnicity (NH = Non-Hispanic)	Pop 2000	Pop 2010	Pop 2020	% 2000	% 2010	% 2020
White alone (NH)	22,892	19,701	17,805	66.36%	52.33%	45.49%
Black or African American alone (NH)	799	806	885	2.32%	2.14%	2.26%
Native American or Alaska Native alone (NH)	35	39	22	0.10%	0.10%	0.06%
Asian alone (NH)	3,183	4,826	6,506	9.23%	12.82%	16.62%
Native Hawaiian or Pacific Islander alone (NH)	18	2	6	0.05%	0.01%	0.02%
Other race alone (NH)	43	54	172	0.12%	0.14%	0.44%
Mixed race or Multiracial (NH)	391	462	694	1.13%	1.23%	1.77%
Hispanic or Latino (any race)	7,135	11,758	13,047	20.68%	31.23%	33.34%
Total	34,496	37,648	39,137	100.00%	100.00%	100.00%

=== 2020 census ===
As of the 2020 census, Wheeling had a population of 39,137. The population density was 4,483.05 inhabitants per square mile (1,730.92/km^{2}). The median age was 39.4 years; 19.3% of residents were under the age of 18 and 17.3% were 65 years of age or older.

For every 100 females there were 97.7 males, and for every 100 females age 18 and over there were 95.6 males age 18 and over. 100.0% of residents lived in urban areas, while 0.0% lived in rural areas.

There were 15,312 households, 9,673 families, and 16,190 housing units, with an average housing-unit density of 1,854.52 per square mile (716.03/km^{2}). Of the housing units, 5.4% were vacant. Of all households, 28.3% had children under the age of 18 living in them, 48.5% were married-couple households, 19.6% had a male householder and no spouse or partner present, and 26.0% had a female householder and no spouse or partner present. About 28.9% of all households were made up of individuals, and 11.4% had someone living alone who was 65 years of age or older. The homeowner vacancy rate was 1.4% and the rental vacancy rate was 7.6%.

=== Income and poverty ===
The median income for a household in the village was $71,966, and the median income for a family was $83,406. Males had a median income of $45,470 versus $36,478 for females. The per capita income for the village was $36,999. About 5.6% of families and 8.2% of the population were below the poverty line, including 12.0% of those under age 18 and 8.8% of those age 65 or over.

== Economy ==
As of the 2020 Census, Wheeling's economy employs 21,671 people in many different industry sectors. Wheeling was home to video game company Jaleco USA and to the American branch of Taito.

A famous hotel called the Union Hotel used to be located on Milwaukee Avenue. It was built in 1856 and reconstructed following a fire in 1925. Over the years, the building evolved into several restaurants. Billy and Company, a restaurant, was the last occupant of the building, which was torn down in 1996 to make way for Union Commons condominiums.

Camp Ramah, a Jewish day camp, is located in Wheeling.

The Korean Cultural Center of Chicago is located in Wheeling.

=== Top employers ===
WheelingTop employers
#	Employer	# of Employees
1	SG360	646
2	Durable Packaging International	500
3	Reynolds Consumer Products	337
4	Viant	286
5	Argon Medical Devices	283
6	Richelieu Foods	230
7	Hidden Valley Manufacturing	225
8	Greek American Rehabilitation & Care Center	186
9	Walmart	183
10	Engis Corporation	177

=== Employment by industry ===
WheelingEmployment by industry
Industry	Employment	Percentage
Educational services, and health care and social assistance	4,026	18.6%
Manufacturing	3,404	15.7%
Professional, scientific, and management, and administrative and waste management services	2,772	12.8%
Arts, entertainment, and recreation, and accommodation and food services	2,277	10.5%
Retail trade	2,274	10.5%
Transportation and warehousing, and utilities	1,721	7.9%
Finance and insurance, and real estate and rental and leasing	1,202	5.5%
Construction	1,192	5.5%
Other services, except public administration	1,154	5.3%
Wholesale trade	991	4.6%
Public administration	387	1.8%
Information	230	1.1%
Agriculture, forestry, fishing and hunting, and mining	41	0.2%
Total	21,671	100%

== Parks and Recreation ==
Wheeling's multiple parks and facilities are owned and managed by the Wheeling Park District.

=== Parks ===
- Avalon Sienna Park
- Chamber Park
- Childerly Park
- Denoyer Park
- Heritage Park
- Horizon Park
- Husky Park
- Malibu Park
- Mark Twain Park
- Meadowbrook Park
- Northside Park
- Pleasant Run Park

=== Facilities ===
- Chamber Park Historic Museum
- Chevy Chase County Club & Golf Course
- Community Recreation Center
- Family Aquatic Center Outdoor Pool
- Health and Fitness Center
- Sports Complex

== Arts and culture ==
Wheeling has a historical museum located in Chamber Park, and is a cooperative effort with the Village of Wheeling, Wheeling Park District, Indian Trails Public Library.

=== Libraries ===
The Indian Trails Public Library District is located in the Village of Wheeling and it serves the majority of its residents. The Indian Trails Public Library District also serves different portions of Buffalo Grove, Prospect Heights, and Arlington Heights. The library also operates a small branch in Prospect Heights.

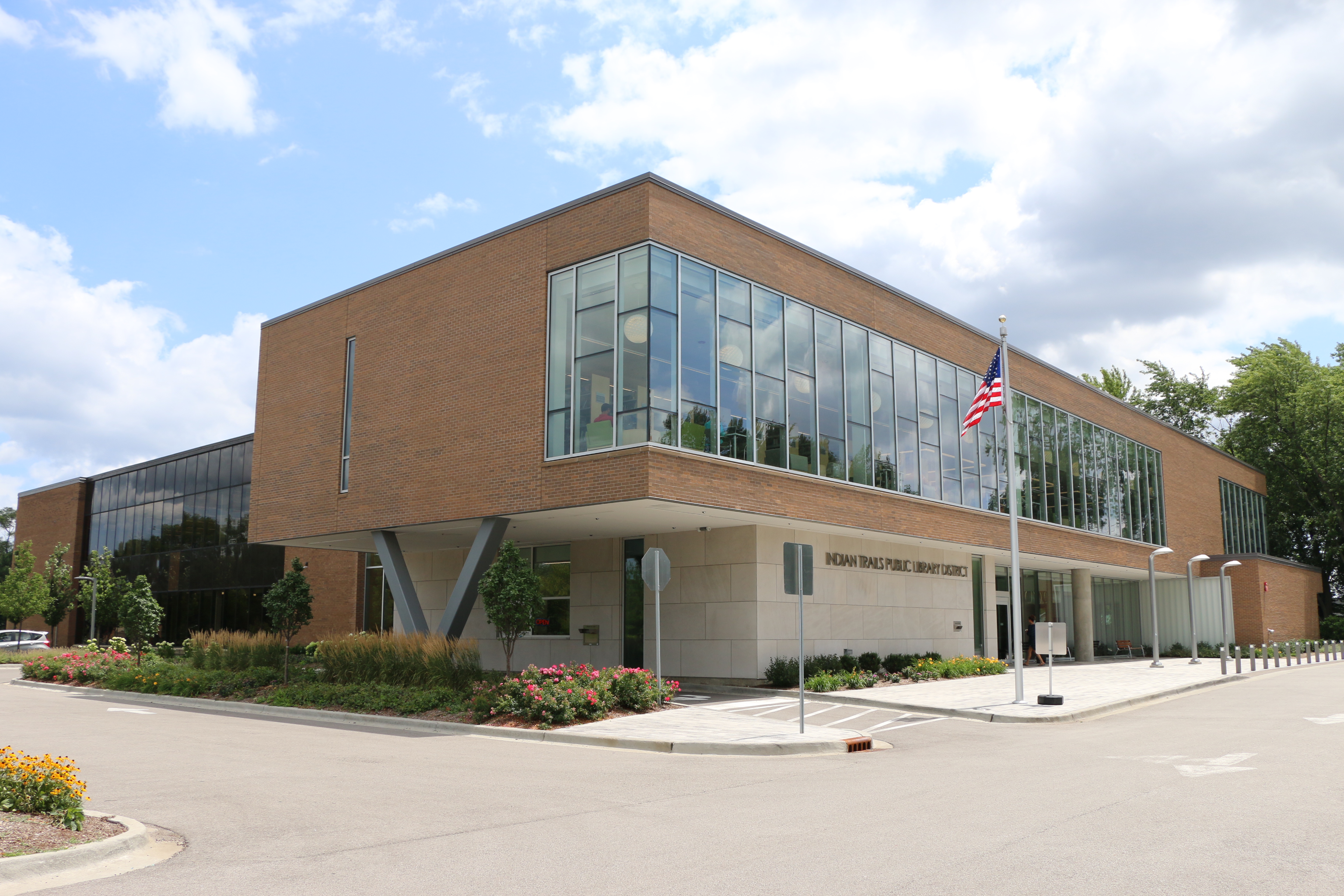
Indian Trails Public Library after renovation in 2017

The Prospect Heights Public Library District serves a part of the Village of Wheeling.

=== Annual events ===
The Wheeling International Festival is a cultural event hosted at the Heritage Park Performance Pavilion. The festival takes place during the summer and it features music, dance, and cultural booths to celebrate the diversity in the community.

The Wheeling Health Fair is an event designed for businesses and organizations to share information. Families are able to walk around, explore, and learn about recourses found in the community. NWSRA, Hands Off Wheeling, Link Together Coalition, OMNI, and the Wheeling Police Department were some of the organizations present.

Rock N Run the Runway is a summer event hosted at the Chicago Executive Airport which features a 5k run, entertainment, food, and ends with a firework show.

Lights Around Wheeling is a Christmas lighting celebration hosted at Friendship Park. The celebration marks the beginning of the holiday season in the community.

Lollipop Lane is an event hosted in Chamber Park every December. The community center, which used to be a church, is decorated to match the Christmas theme. Homemade cookies are sold during the event and kids are able to take a picture with Santa.

== Government ==
=== Structure ===
The government of Wheeling is a council-manager form of government. Village Hall is where residents are able to attend board meetings, which take place the first and third Monday of the month, and take an active role in the community. Wheeling’s government is made up of a Village President and a Board of Trustees who are elected by the public. The Village Manager handles day to day operations and is appointed by the Village President and the Board of Trustees.

=== Elected Officials ===
Representatives who represent Wheeling in the Illinois General Assembly are:

- State Representative (54th District): Mary Beth Canty
- State Representative (57th District): Tracy Katz Muhl
- State Representative (59th District): Daniel Didech
- State Senator (29th District): Julie Morrison
- State Senator (30th District): Adriane Johnson

Representatives who represent Wheeling in a Federal level are:

- U.S. Representative (10th District): Brad Schneider
- U.S. Representative (9th District): Jan Schakowsky

=== Community Participation ===
In late 2025, there was an increase in local government participation as residents pushed for a strong response against ICE and Operation Midway Blitz, which affected the community. On November 1, a group of federal immigration agents approached a Wheeling fire station asking to use its parking lot. This led the Village to plan a vote to ban civil immigration enforcement on Village property in the following board meeting. On November 3, the vote on the resolution took place, and representatives from community organizations such as Hands Off Wheeling, Wheeling Strong, and Wheeling Rapid Response Team spoke. The resolution passed banning federal agents from using parking lots, vacant lots, and garages that are owned or controlled by the village of Wheeling.

On March 28, 2026, Hands Off Wheeling hosted the village's first No Kings Protest in response to the targeting of the Hispanic community during Operation Midway Blitz. The protest included speeches from Hands Off Wheeling Members who attend Wheeling High School, who addressed rising issues in the area such as immigration, gasoline prices, and grocery costs. After the speeches, the crowd of around 200 people marched towards Dundee Road and waved signs as cars honked by.

== Education ==
=== Primary and secondary schools ===
Schools located in Wheeling are administered by Wheeling Community Consolidated School District 21 and Township High School District 214. They include:

- Field Elementary School
- Holmes Middle School
- London Middle School
- Tarkington Elementary School
- Twain Elementary School
- Wheeling High School
- Whitman Elementary School

=== Private schools ===
- J. Slowacki School, kindergarten to grade 11
- East Capitol High School, grades 9–12

=== Colleges and universities ===
National Louis University is an accredited, private, non-profit undergraduate and graduate institution of higher learning, organized in colleges of education, arts and sciences, and business and management. Worsham College of Mortuary Science is an accredited, private institution offering associate degrees and diplomas in mortuary science.

=== Other education ===
The Consulate-General of South Korea in Chicago maintains the Korean Education Center in Wheeling.

== Infrastructure ==
=== Transportation ===
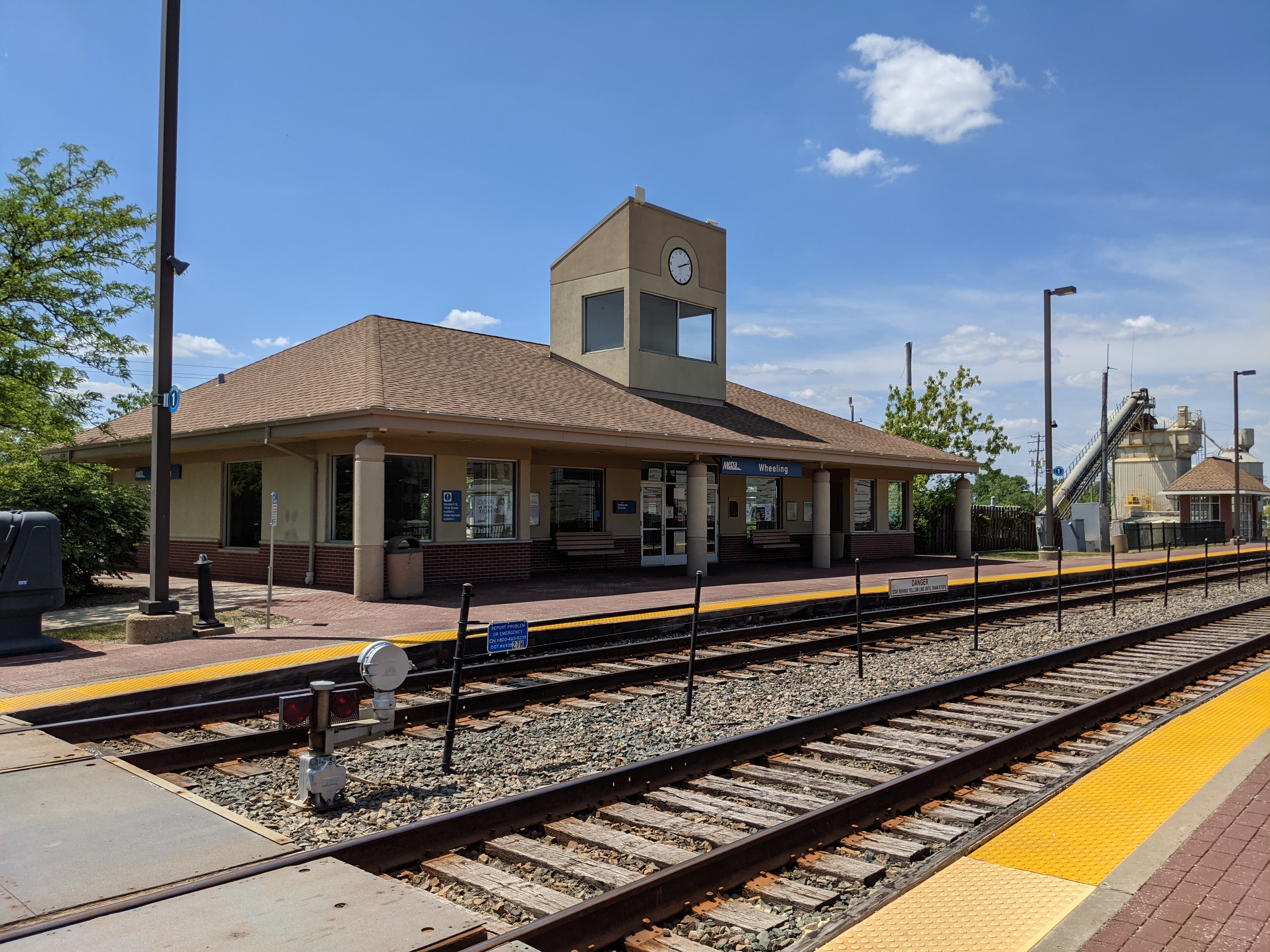
Wheeling Metra Station

Wheeling has a station on Metra's North Central Service, which provides daily commuter rail service between Antioch and Chicago Union Station Monday through Friday. Metra Trains do not operate in Wheeling during the weekends.

Pace provides bus service on multiple routes connecting Wheeling to Des Plaines, Buffalo Grove, and other destinations.

Chicago Executive Airport, a busy general aviation airport, is located in Wheeling and Prospect Heights and jointly run by both villages. Formerly known as Palwaukee Municipal Airport, it is the fourth busiest airport in Illinois, after Chicago's O'Hare, Midway and DuPage airports.

== Notable people ==
- John Francis Daley, actor
- Mark Newman, executive with New York Yankees
- Dan Patlak, former commissioner of the Cook County Board of Review
- Haley Reinhart, singer
- Mike Rucinski, ice hockey center
- Deborah Voigt, opera singer
