= Indian Creek, Illinois =

- Village
- Location of Indian Creek in Lake County, Illinois.
- Coordinates: 42°13′38″N 87°58′42″W
- Country: United States
- State: Illinois
- County: Lake
- Township: Vernon

Area
  - Total: 0.27 sq mi (0.69 km^{2})
  - Land: 0.27 sq mi (0.69 km^{2})
  - Water: 0 sq mi (0.00 km^{2})
- Elevation: 732 ft (223 m)

Population (2020)
  - Total: 536
  - Density: 2,008/sq mi (775.2/km^{2})
- Time zone: UTC-6 (CST)
  - Summer (DST): UTC-5 (CDT)
- ZIP code: 60061
- Area codes: 847, 224
- FIPS code: 17-37218
- GNIS feature ID: 2398570

Indian Creek is a village in Vernon Township, Lake County, Illinois, United States. It is part of the Chicago metropolitan area. Per the 2020 census, the population was 536. Police services are provided by Lake County Sheriff and fire/EMS services by the Countryside Fire Protection District.

== History ==
Indian Creek was originally incorporated in 1958 as a response to the threat of annexation by neighboring Vernon Hills. The incorporation is known as a paper incorporation and was accomplished by attorney Harold P. Block, who became the first Chief of Police of the Village of Indian Creek.

This location may be confused with the Indian Creek Massacre, detailed below, which actually occurred in LaSalle County near Ottawa, IL. During the Black Hawk War of 1832, which was the last Indian war in Illinois, Indian Creek, was the scene of an attack, by a renegade band of 40-80 Potawatomi and Sauk, on the Davis Settlement, where 15 white settlers were killed and scalped.

== Geography ==
According to the 2021 census gazetteer files, Indian Creek has a total area of 0.27 square miles (0.70 km^{2}), all land. It has the smallest area of any incorporated place in Lake County.

== Demographics ==
Historical population
| Census | Pop. | Note | %± |
|---|---|---|---|
| 1960 | 239 | | — |
| 1970 | 270 | | 13.0% |
| 1980 | 236 | | −12.6% |
| 1990 | 247 | | 4.7% |
| 2000 | 194 | | −21.5% |
| 2010 | 462 | | 138.1% |
| 2020 | 536 | | 16.0% |
U.S. Decennial Census; 2010 2020

As of the 2020 census, there were 536 people, 201 households, and 169 families residing in the village. The population density was 2,007.49 inhabitants per square mile (775.10/km^{2}). There were 198 housing units at an average density of 741.57 per square mile (286.32/km^{2}). The racial makeup of the village was 60.26% White, 4.29% African American, 1.49% Native American, 26.31% Asian, 0.00% Pacific Islander, 1.31% from other races, and 6.34% from two or more races. Hispanic or Latino of any race were 5.04% of the population.

There were 201 households, out of which 41.3% had children under the age of 18 living with them, 67.16% were married couples living together, 14.93% had a female householder with no husband present, and 15.92% were non-families. 14.43% of all households were made up of individuals, and 9.45% had someone living alone who was 65 years of age or older. The average household size was 4.01 and the average family size was 3.69.

The village's age distribution consisted of 22.1% under the age of 18, 6.2% from 18 to 24, 19.4% from 25 to 44, 25.5% from 45 to 64, and 26.8% who were 65 years of age or older. The median age was 45.9 years. For every 100 females, there were 97.9 males. For every 100 females age 18 and over, there were 83.9 males.

The median income for a household in the village was $124,375, and the median income for a family was $125,625. Males had a median income of $80,536 versus $39,241 for females. The per capita income for the village was $48,083. About 10.7% of families and 9.9% of the population were below the poverty line, including 11.3% of those under age 18 and 3.9% of those age 65 or over.

Indian Creek village, Illinois – Racial and ethnic composition Note: the US Census treats Hispanic/Latino as an ethnic category. This table excludes Latinos from the racial categories and assigns them to a separate category. Hispanics/Latinos may be of any race.
| Race / Ethnicity (NH = Non-Hispanic) | Pop 2000 | Pop 2010 | Pop 2020 | % 2000 | % 2010 | % 2020 |
|---|---|---|---|---|---|---|
| White alone (NH) | 180 | 333 | 319 | 92.78% | 72.08% | 59.51% |
| Black or African American alone (NH) | 0 | 10 | 23 | 0.00% | 2.16% | 4.29% |
| Native American or Alaska Native alone (NH) | 0 | 0 | 5 | 0.00% | 0.00% | 0.93% |
| Asian alone (NH) | 1 | 83 | 140 | 0.52% | 17.97% | 26.12% |
| Native Hawaiian or Pacific Islander alone (NH) | 0 | 0 | 0 | 0.00% | 0.00% | 0.00% |
| Other race alone (NH) | 4 | 0 | 3 | 2.06% | 0.00% | 0.56% |
| Mixed race or Multiracial (NH) | 1 | 5 | 19 | 0.52% | 1.08% | 3.54% |
| Hispanic or Latino (any race) | 8 | 31 | 27 | 4.12% | 6.71% | 5.04% |
| Total | 194 | 462 | 536 | 100.00% | 100.00% | 100.00% |
