= Vernon Hills, Illinois =

Vernon Hills
- Village
- The Village of Vernon Hills, Illinois
- Logo
- Motto: "People Planning With Pride"
- Location of Vernon Hills in Lake County, Illinois.
- Coordinates: 42°14′45″N 87°57′43″W
- Country: United States
- State: Illinois
- County: Lake
- Townships: Libertyville, Vernon
- Settled: 1851
- Incorporated as village: June 16, 1958

Area
  - Total: 7.95 sq mi (20.58 km^{2})
  - Land: 7.74 sq mi (20.05 km^{2})
  - Water: 0.20 sq mi (0.53 km^{2})
- Elevation: 682 ft (208 m)

Population (2020)
  - Total: 26,850
  - Density: 3,468.6/sq mi (1,339.22/km^{2})
- Time zone: UTC-6 (CST)
  - Summer (DST): UTC-5 (CDT)
- ZIP code: 60061
- Area code(s): 847 & 224
- FIPS code: 17-77694
- GNIS feature ID: 2400063
- Website: www.vernonhills.org

Vernon Hills is a suburb north of Chicago, Illinois in Lake County, Illinois, United States. The population was 27,000 at the 2020 census. Vernon Hills serves as a retail hub for its surrounding area (Libertyville, Lake Forest, Mundelein, Long Grove, Lincolnshire and Buffalo Grove).

== History ==
The land that was to become Vernon Hills, founded by Richard Theodore Freese, Ron Freese, Nathan Kowitt, and Jim Carswell, began with the establishment of a 200-acre (0.81 km^{2}) farm in 1857. Use of the land remained relatively static until the 1960s, when part of it was purchased for a residential community and golf course; the development was the first use of the name "Vernon Hills." On June 16, 1958, the village officially incorporated with 123 residents and 125 houses in a single subdivision built by Quinn Hogan and Barney Loeb. During these times, the village and police department were run from a local motel until 1971 when village trustees bought two portable buildings. It saw steady but slow growth until the annexing of a plot of land near the corner of IL-60 and IL-21 in 1971, which led to the building of 1,200,000-square-foot (110,000 m^{2}) Hawthorn Center. By 1980, the village's population had grown to almost 10,000 residents, and by 2000, it had surpassed 20,000.

Through the 1980s and 1990s, the village grew geographically through the annexation of surrounding areas. This included land that would become the Corporate Woods business park and Centennial Crossing residential development (1986), a 1,200-acre (4.9 km^{2}) section of Hawthorne-Mellody Farms (1988), and part of the village of Half Day (1994).

== Geography ==
According to the 2021 census gazetteer files, Vernon Hills has a total area of 7.95 square miles (20.59 km^{2}), of which 7.74 square miles (20.05 km^{2}) (or 97.43%) is land and 0.20 square miles (0.52 km^{2}) (or 2.57%) is water.

=== Climate ===
Climate data for Vernon Hills, Illinois
Month	Jan	Feb	Mar	Apr	May	Jun	Jul	Aug	Sep	Oct	Nov	Dec	Year
Mean daily maximum °F (°C)	32 (0)	36 (2)	45 (7)	57 (14)	68 (20)	78 (26)	83 (28)	81 (27)	74 (23)	62 (17)	49 (9)	36 (2)	58.416 (14.68)
Mean daily minimum °F (°C)	16 (−9)	19 (−7)	28 (−2)	38 (3)	47 (8)	57 (14)	63 (17)	62 (17)	54 (12)	42 (6)	33 (1)	20 (−7)	36.916 (2.73)

== Demographics ==
Historical population
Census	Pop.	Note	%±
1960	123		—
1970	1,056		758.5%
1980	9,827		830.6%
1990	15,319		55.9%
2000	20,120		31.3%
2010	25,113		24.8%
2020	26,850		6.9%
U.S. Decennial Census; 2010 2020

=== Racial and ethnic composition ===
Vernon Hills village, Illinois – Racial and ethnic composition Note: the US Census treats Hispanic/Latino as an ethnic category. This table excludes Latinos from the racial categories and assigns them to a separate category. Hispanics/Latinos may be of any race.
Race / Ethnicity (NH = Non-Hispanic)	Pop 2000	Pop 2010	Pop 2020	% 2000	% 2010	% 2020
White alone (NH)	15,691	16,434	15,039	77.99%	65.44%	56.01%
Black or African American alone (NH)	336	527	635	1.67%	2.10%	2.36%
Native American or Alaska Native alone (NH)	10	19	36	0.05%	0.08%	0.13%
Asian alone (NH)	2,337	4,848	6,931	11.62%	19.30%	25.81%
Native Hawaiian or Pacific Islander alone (NH)	2	10	10	0.01%	0.04%	0.04%
Other race alone (NH)	30	25	120	0.15%	0.10%	0.45%
Mixed race or Multiracial (NH)	268	390	810	1.33%	1.55%	3.02%
Hispanic or Latino (any race)	1,446	2,860	3,269	7.19%	11.39%	12.18%
Total	20,120	25,113	26,850	100.00%	100.00%	100.00%

=== 2020 census ===
As of the 2020 census, Vernon Hills had a population of 26,850. The median age was 41.2 years. 24.3% of residents were under the age of 18 and 14.7% of residents were 65 years of age or older. For every 100 females there were 93.4 males, and for every 100 females age 18 and over there were 89.4 males age 18 and over.

100.0% of residents lived in urban areas, while 0.0% lived in rural areas.

There were 10,346 households in Vernon Hills, including 7,218 families. Of all households, 36.7% had children under the age of 18 living in them, 56.9% were married-couple households, 14.1% were households with a male householder and no spouse or partner present, and 24.7% were households with a female householder and no spouse or partner present. About 26.1% of all households were made up of individuals and 11.6% had someone living alone who was 65 years of age or older.

There were 10,996 housing units, of which 5.9% were vacant. The homeowner vacancy rate was 1.2% and the rental vacancy rate was 8.6%. The population density was 3,379.48 inhabitants per square mile (1,304.82/km^{2}), and the housing unit density was 1,384.02 per square mile (534.37/km^{2}).

=== Income and poverty ===
The median income for a household in the village was $100,725, and the median income for a family was $123,919. Males had a median income of $76,259 versus $46,682 for females. The per capita income for the village was $49,540. About 5.3% of families and 6.5% of the population were below the poverty line, including 6.1% of those under age 18 and 12.4% of those age 65 or over.

=== Demographic estimates ===
In 2011 Vernon Hills had 4,858 persons of Asian ancestry, 19.3% of the village's population, the sixth highest percentage of Asians of any Chicago suburb. The Asian population figure was more than twice that of 2001. John Kalmar, the village manager, said that despite the increase from 2001 to 2011, "We haven't seen a specific increase in Asian-oriented types of businesses, and I haven't noticed in any significant way changes in what businesses are carrying."

== Economy ==
- American Optical Company, a luxury eyewear designer and manufacturer
- CDW, a provider of technology products and services for business, government and education, is based out of Vernon Hills.
- Zebra Technologies, a manufacturer of thermal bar code label and receipt printers used by over 90 percent of Fortune 500 companies, is based out of Vernon Hills.
- American Hotel Register Company, a well-known manufacturer and supplier of hospitality products and services, is based out of Vernon Hills.
- Rust-Oleum Corporation, a worldwide leader in protective paints and coatings for both home and industry, is based out of Vernon Hills.
- Cole-Parmer, a scientific and industrial instrument distributor

Recently, Vernon Hills developed a former 52 acre soybean field into a $200 million shopping center known as Mellody Farm, whose tenants are a host of restaurant and retail businesses.

When Tiger Electronics was an independent company, its headquarters were in Vernon Hills.

=== Top employers ===
According to the Village's 2021 Annual Comprehensive Financial Report, the top employers in the city were:

#	Employer	# of Employees
1	Hawthorn Mall	2,500
2	American Hotel Register (HQ)	500
3	Mitsubishi Electric Automation	400
4	CDW (HQ)	350
4	Rust-Oleum (HQ)	350
6	ZF Aftermarket	300
6	Cole-Parmer (HQ)	300
6	Becton Dickinson	300
9	Richard Wolf Medical Instruments Corp.	200
10	Neil Enterprises	160

== Arts and culture ==
Vernon Hills is one of six communities which, in part, comprise the Cook Memorial Public Library District. The Evergreen Interim library, which was one of the District's two library facilities, closed on July 3, 2010. On July 10, 2010, the new Aspen Drive Library opened to the public. This 20,000-square-foot (1,900 m^{2}) building is located across the street from the Vernon Hills Elementary and Grade School Campus at 701 N Aspen Drive.

The Aspen Drive Library in Vernon Hills is the village's first full-service library. The new library is 20,000 sq. ft. and offers 120,000 volumes of books, movies and music. The library also has an interactive children's department, a high-tech teen area, a state-of-the-art computer lab, small group study spaces and community meeting rooms.

The remainder of Vernon Hills is in the Vernon Area Public Library District.

Vernon Hills is the headquarters of the Northeast Illinois Council, which is a council of Scouting America.

== Parks and recreation ==
In 2000, the village acquired land that had belonged at different times to the U.S. Army as a Nike missile base, the U.S. Navy as a naval training center, and the Curtiss Candy Company; it was converted to what is now the 184-acre (0.74 km^{2}) Vernon Hills Athletic Complex (VHAC).

== Government ==
Vernon Hills lies in the Illinois 10th Congressional District.

== Education ==
There are six grade schools in the village served by the Hawthorn School District. In 2006, Hawthorn Junior High School was formally divided into Hawthorn Middle School North and Hawthorn Middle School South. High school students, who formerly went to Libertyville High School, now attend (as of 2000–2001) either Vernon Hills High School or Libertyville High School.

Students living in the southwest corner of Vernon Hills attend Long Grove grade schools (Country Meadows & Woodlawn). Some subdivisions in southern Vernon Hills send students to Lincolnshire schools, including Adlai E. Stevenson High School. A small area in the southwest corner of the village is zoned to attend the high school in Mundelein, IL.

Elementary Schoolers may be enrolled in four different Hawthorn Schools. Hawthorn Elementary South, Hawthorn Elementary North, Aspen Elementary, or Townline Elementary.

== Infrastructure ==
=== Transportation ===
Vernon Hills has a station on Metra's North Central Service, which provides week-day rush hour rail service between Antioch, Illinois and Chicago, Illinois (at Union Station). It is also serviced by Pace buses.

== Notable people ==
- Sam Acho, football player
- Alex Brown, football player
- Jermon Bushrod, football player
- Desmond Clark, football player
- Tarik Cohen, football player
- Jay Cutler, football player
- DaVaris Daniels, football player
- Phillip Daniels, football player and coach
- David Dobrik, YouTuber
- Steve Dubinsky, hockey player
- Leonard Floyd, football player
- Robert P. Hanrahan, politician
- Devin Hester, football player
- Christopher Howarth, figure skater
- Kathleen A. Ryg, politician
- Cairo Santos, football player
- Carol Sente, politician
- Nicole Sladkov, rhythmic gymnast
- Evan Spencer, football player
- Tim Spencer, football player and coach
- Nathan Vasher, football player
- Kevin Walter, football player
- Cody Whitehair, football player
