= Space National Guard =

Proposed National Guard component of the United States Space Force

The Space National Guard is the proposed National Guard component of the United States Space Force.

== Cost ==
A 2020 report by the Congressional Budget Office indicated that the creation of a Space National Guard, as proposed by the National Guard Bureau, would cost an additional $100 million per year in operations and support costs, with a onetime cost of $20 million in the construction of new facilities. This report directly contradicted the statement by the National Guard Bureau that a Space National Guard would only have a onetime cost at creation, and then be cost-neutral.

The report also analyzed the cost of the creation of a larger Space National Guard, which would be ~33% of the Space Force, calculating that the annual operating cost would be $385 million to $490 million per year.

== Proposal history ==
=== Pre-2019 ===
In September 2018, Air Force Major General Donald P. Dunbar, the Adjutant General of Wisconsin, penned an editorial for the Air Force Times in which he wrote that "it seems logical that the nation would see the Guard as an asset in a new Space Force". Members of the United States Congress, including Senators Joe Manchin and Jack Reed, also expressed concern the Department of Defense's proposal did not include the creation of a Space National Guard component. The following month, Director of the Air National Guard Gen L. Scott Rice stated that the Defense Department was committed to having both space reserve and National Guard components.

In June 2019, Congressman Jason Crow of Colorado introduced an amendment to the National Defense Authorization Act for Fiscal Year 2020, which stipulated that the "Secretary of Defense may not transfer any personnel or resources from any reserve components, including the National Guard, to the Space Force ... until the date on which a Space National Guard of the United States has been established by law," however, the language was not included in the final National Defense Authorization Act.

On August 31, 2019, the chief of the National Guard Bureau, Air Force General Joseph Lengyel stated that a Space National Guard should be established. Two days later Air Force Brigadier General Patrick Cobb, special assistant to the National Guard Chief for space, confirmed that a proposed Space National Guard would absorb both Air National Guard and Army National Guard units performing space missions.

=== 2019–2023 ===
The Senate Armed Services Committee voted to approve its markup of the National Defense Authorization Act for Fiscal Year 2022. Included in the markup, which will now advance to the full Senate, is a name change for the Air National Guard, making it the Air and Space National Guard. Such a move would likely mean there would be no separate Space Guard established.

The final version of the National Defense Authorization Act did not include any provision for a Space National Guard or federal Space Force reserve component. The Space Force is evaluating a number of different options for reserve components, including a new single component service with both full time and part time members or removing traditional reserve components, like the National Guard all together. A report on Space Force reserve structure is due to the United States Congress on 19 March 2020. The inclusion of a Space National Guard, as opposed to just a Space Force reserve, has been quite controversial, as there is only a federal mission in space, without any state missions, and a concern that individual states will lobby for their own Space National Guard units, dramatically increasing bureaucratic overhead for the sake of benefiting their local economies.

A number of National Guard generals, including Army Major General David Baldwin, Adjutant General of California, and Air Force Major General Michael A. Loh, then the Adjutant General of Colorado, have expressed concern that the Defense Department will not endorse a Space National Guard and have opted to ignore the Office of the Secretary of Defense and instead have directly lobbied Congress for a Space National Guard. Maj. Gen. Baldwin stated: "When they’re going to act and whether they allow [Office of the Secretary of Defense] to go through their process to come to the conclusion on their own that we need a Space National Guard, or we leverage Congress and have Congress just put it in the NDAA and make it happen remains to be seen."

=== 2024: Legislative Proposal 480 ===
On March 29, 2024, the Defense Department submitted to Congress Legislative Proposal 480, which if enacted would transfer space units in the Air National Guard to the Space Force, and override the requirement under federal law for the state Governor to give consent to such a transfer. On April 9, the National Governors Association Chair (Governor Spencer Cox of Utah, a Republican) and Vice Chair (Governor Jared Polis of Colorado, a Democrat) released a joint statement urging that the proposal be withdrawn. In an April 9 interview, General Daniel R. Hokanson, Chief of the National Guard Bureau, expressed agreement with the interviewer's contention that the proposal would "jeopardize national security". In an April 16 op-ed, the head of the National Guard Association called the proposal an "existential threat to the National Guard as a whole". At an April 17 hearing of the House Armed Services Committee, Air Force Secretary Frank Kendall and Chief of Space Operations General Chance Saltzman expressed their support for the proposal, as did committee Chairman Mike Rogers (R-AL), while committee member Rep. Joe Wilson (R-SC), a National Guard veteran, criticised the proposal as an "end-run on gubernatorial authority". In an April 18 op-ed, Major General Richard R. Neely, Adjutant general of Illinois, argued that the proposal would degrade space warfare capabilities and damage the authority of state Governors. On April 19, Governor of Ohio Mike DeWine published an open letter to President Joe Biden, expressing opposition to the proposal in his capacity as the Ohio National Guard's commander-in-chief, and suggesting the creation of a Space National Guard as an acceptable alternative. On April 22, the Council of Governors published an open letter to Secretary of Defense Lloyd Austin calling on the proposal to be withdrawn. On April 29, the governors of 48 states (all except Texas and Florida) and all five permanently inhabited U.S. territories sent an open letter to Austin reiterating the call for the proposal to be withdrawn. While neither Florida Governor Ron DeSantis nor Texas Governor Greg Abbott signed that letter, they subsequently on May 3 sent individual letters expressing the same request, with Abbott's letter addressed to President Biden, and DeSantis' addressed to Secretary Austin. On May 6, a bipartisan group of 56 members of the U.S. House of Representatives and 29 U.S. Senators sent a letter to the House and Senate Armed Services Committees, expressing opposition to the proposal.

On May 22, the House Armed Services Committee approved its version of the National Defense Authorization Act 2025, including Legislative Proposal 480; however, it accepted an amendment proposed by Joe Wilson, adding a requirement for gubernatorial consent to any transfers from the Air National Guard to Space Force. On June 5, the Defense subcommittee of the House Appropriations Committee advanced a Defense appropriations bill containing a prohibition on transfers from the National Guard to the Space Force without gubernatorial consent.

On June 18, in testimony before the Defense Subcommittee of the Senate Appropriations Committee, General Hokanson (NGB Chief) argued that "we actually have a Space National Guard, we're just not willing to admit it".

=== Trump campaign promise ===
On August 26, Donald Trump addressed the 146th annual conference of the National Guard Association of the United States (NGAUS), as part of his 2024 Presidential campaign. In his speech, he promised that if elected, he would sign legislation to create a Space National Guard. Analysts viewed Trump's victory in the 2024 Presidential election as significantly increasing the odds the Space National Guard comes into existence.

=== 2025 ===
On March 11, 2025, Senators Mike Crapo (R‑ID) and John Hickenlooper (D‑CO) introduced the Space National Guard Establishment Act into the Senate (S. 963), seeking to establish a Space National Guard; on the same day, Representatives Jason Crow (D‑CO) and Lauren Boebert (R‑CO) introduced an identical companion bill into the House (H.R. 2042). This new legislative attempt is seen as having somewhat greater odds of success than previous attempts, given Trump made a Space National Guard a campaign promise, suggesting the White House would likely support the legislation; a change from the Biden administration, which opposed previous bills, and whose opposition led to the Pentagon opposing them as well.

== Organization ==
Seven U.S. states conduct National Guard space operations.

States with existing National Guard space operations are Alaska, California, Colorado, Florida, New York, Arkansas, and Ohio; there is also a space component in the Guam Air National Guard. In November 2024, the Hawaii Air National Guard activated two space units.

== See also ==
- United States Space Command
