= David Harris (Illinois politician) =

American politician

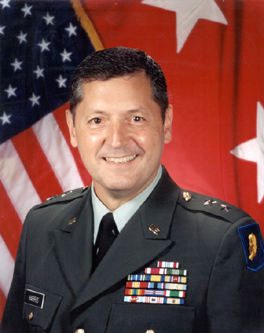
- Harris as Adjutant General

Director the Illinois Department of Revenue
- Incumbent
- Assumed office 2019

Member of the Illinois House of Representatives for the 53rd District 66th district (2011–2013)
- In office January 2011 – January 2019
- Preceded by: Mark Walker
- Succeeded by: Mark Walker
- In office January 1983 – January 1993
- Preceded by: District Created
- Succeeded by: Carolyn H. Krause

35th Adjutant General of Illinois
- In office 1999–2003
- Preceded by: Richard Austin
- Succeeded by: Randal E. Thomas

Personal details
- Born: March 26, 1948 (age 78) Reading, Pennsylvania, U.S.
- Party: Republican
- Spouse: Michelle Harris
- Children: Two sons
- Education: Georgetown University (B.A.); U.S. Army CGSC (I.L.E.)

Military service
- Allegiance: United States
- Branch/service: United States Army
- Years of service: 1970–2003
- Rank: Major General
- Unit: Illinois National Guard
- Battles/wars: Operation Iraqi Freedom

David C. Harris (born March 26, 1948) an American politician and retired military officer from Illinois who is currently the director the Illinois Department of Revenue. He has previously served two tenures as a Republican member of the Illinois House of Representatives from 1983 to 1993 and 2011–2019 and as the Adjutant General of Illinois from 1999 to 2003.

== Early life and career ==
Harris was born March 26, 1948, in Reading, Pennsylvania. He graduated from St. Viator High School in Arlington Heights. Harris graduated from Georgetown University. He became an associate member of the Chicago Board of Trade during the 1970s, but ceased trading prior to 2011. After a brief period of time in Pennsylvania, Harris moved to Arlington Heights, Illinois where he and his wife reside.

== Military career ==
Harris joined the military in 1970 as a military policeman. In 1971, he attended Officer Candidate School and returned to serve as a platoon leader in the 471st Military Police Company of the District of Columbia Army National Guard. From 1974 until 1980, Harris served as a member of the Pennsylvania Army National Guard. In 1980, he joined the Illinois Army National Guard as an assistant correctional officer with the 33rd Military Police Battalion in Chicago. He was promoted to Staff Provost Marshal at the State Area Command in Springfield, Illinois. In 1989, he graduated from the United States Army Command and General Staff College. That same year, he became the Chief Historian. In 1992, he was promoted to the Commander of the 44th Support Center. In 1997, he was promoted to Section Chief of the Selective Service.

In July 1999, George Ryan named Harris the Adjutant General of Illinois to succeed Richard Austin. As Adjutant General, he was the principal advisor to the Governor of Illinois on military matters and served as the Commanding General of both the Illinois Army and Air National Guard. His responsibility the Guard's daily operations and oversight of approximately 13,500 uniformed personnel. Harris was the first Adjutant General appointed under the criteria of Senate Bill 1227. Harris retired from the Illinois National Guard in 2003 and was succeeded as Adjutant General by Randal E. Thomas.

Harris was inducted into the Infantry Officer Candidate School Hall of Fame at Fort Benning in 2002.

=== Post military service ===
Harris served in Iraq with the US Department of State as the deputy director and chief of staff of the Iraq Reconstruction Management Office.

== Political career ==
Harris served on Ronald Reagan's national advance staff in the 1976 Republican primary, and presidential elections of 1980 and 1984. He was elected an alternate delegate to the 1984 Republican National Convention. In 1987, Ronald Reagan appointed Harris a member of the Intergovernmental Advisory Council on Education.

=== First House tenure ===
In 1980, Illinois voters passed an amendment to the Illinois Constitution that abolished multi-member districts in the Illinois House of Representatives and the process of cumulative voting. In the 1982 general election, Harris ran as a Republican in the newly created 53rd district. His opponent in the general election was Democratic activist and Elk Grove Park Board commissioner Joan E. Brennan. The district was centered around Elk Grove Township. Harris defeated Brennan in the general election.

Harris lost the 1992 Republican primary to Carolyn H. Krause, a former Mayor of Mount Prospect, Illinois. After his loss, he joined the Illinois Hospital & Health Systems Association as the Senior Vice President for Government Relations. In this role, he directed the association's government relations programs at both the state and federal levels.

=== Second House tenure ===
In 2010, Harris ran again for the Illinois House of Representatives against incumbent Democrat Mark Walker in the 66th district. The 66th district, which had significant overlap on what was the 53rd district, included parts of Elk Grove Village, Mount Prospect, Arlington Heights, Des Plaines, Rolling Meadows, and Schaumburg, Illinois. Harris defeated Walker in the heavily Republican 2010 election.

After the decennial redistricting process, Harris was redistricted to the 53rd District in 2013. The 53rd house district includes parts of Arlington Heights, Des Plaines, Mount Prospect, Rolling Meadows, and Prospect Heights.

In the 2016 Republican Party presidential primaries, Harris was a delegate pledged to the presidential campaign of John Kasich.

He was a sponsor of Senate Bill 2861 which established the Illinois Code of Military Justice; state legislation analogous to the federal Uniform Code of Military Justice.

On October 4, 2017, Harris announced his retirement from the Illinois House citing frustration from the Illinois Budget Impasse. He was succeeded by Mark Walker, who he had unseated eight years earlier.

=== Illinois Department of Revenue ===
In 2018, Governor-elect J. B. Pritzker announced his intention to appoint Harris the Director of the Illinois Department of Revenue. Harris subsequently assumed office in this position after being unanimously confirmed by the Illinois Senate. Harris was later reappointed to the position in 2023 at the beginning Pritzker's second term as Governor and was again unanimously confirmed by the Illinois Senate.
