= Isaac H. Elliott =

American soldier, farmer and rancher (1837–1922)

Isaac Hughes Elliott
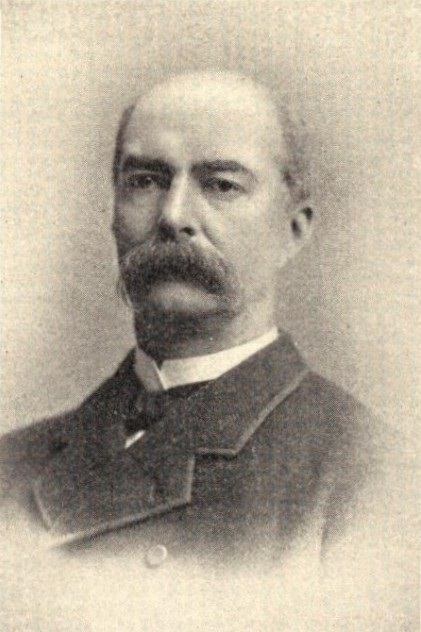

Adjutant general of Illinois
- In office 1880–1884
- President: Chester A. Arthur
- Preceded by: Hiram Hilliard
- Succeeded by: Joseph W. Vance

Personal details
- Born: January 25, 1837 Dover Township, Bureau County, Illinois, U.S.
- Died: December 3, 1922 (aged 85) White Plains, New York, U.S.
- Party: Republican
- Spouse: Elizabeth Sherman Denham (m. 1867)
- Children: 4
- Education: University of Michigan

Military service
- Allegiance: United States (Union)
- Branch: United States Army (Union Army)
- Years of service: 1861–1865; 1880–1884
- Rank: Bvt. Brigadier General; Colonel
- Commands: Illinois National Guard; 33rd Illinois Infantry Regiment
- Battles/wars: American Civil War; Vicksburg campaign; Battle of Port Gibson; Battle of Champion Hill; Battle of Big Black River Bridge; Siege of Vicksburg; Mobile campaign; Battle of Spanish Fort

Isaac Hughes Elliott (January 25, 1837 – December 3, 1922) was an American Brevet Brigadier General who participated in the American Civil War. He commanded the 33rd Illinois Infantry Regiment across several battles of the Vicksburg campaign. Elliott was also the Adjutant general of Illinois from 1880 to 1884.

== Early life ==
Elliott was born on January 25, 1837, on a farm in Dover Township, Bureau County, Illinois near Princeton as the son of John Elliott and Mary Hughes Elliott and both were of Irish origin. Elliott spent his childhood attending pioneer schools as well as being a farmer and rancher. In October 1857, Elliot attended the University of Michigan at the Phi Alpha Literary Society courses before graduating with a Bachelor of Arts degree in June 1861.

== American Civil War ==
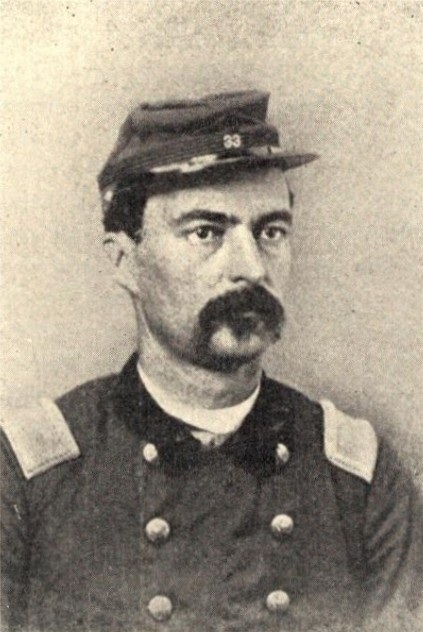
Col. Elliott circa 1865

On September 2, 1861, Elliott entered service as a captain of the 33rd Illinois Infantry Regiment but was wounded and captured on October 15, 1861, but was exchanged in May 1862. On May 30, 1863, Elliott was promoted to major and sent to participate in the Vicksburg campaign and several battles within it. After being promoted to Lieutenant Colonel on September 13, 1864, Elliott was brevetted Brigadier general on March 13, 1865, for his services at the battles of Port Gibson, Champion Hill, Big Black River Bridge, Vicksburg and Spanish Fort. Elliott was promoted to a full colonel on September 30, 1865, before being honorably mustered out in November 1865.

== Post-War Career ==
Elliott returned to Illinois to become the treasurer of Bureau County from 1865 to 1867. On December 17, 1867, Elliott married Elizabeth Sherman Denham and they had 4 children, John Lovejoy, Richard Storrs, Walter White and Roger Sherman. He returned to farming in Bureau County. Elliott was nominated for a Liberal Republican candidate for Congress in 1874 but was "very properly defeated". From 1880 to 1884, Elliott re-enlisted in the United States Army as the Adjutant general of Illinois and became a member of the Loyal Legion around this time. In 1894, Elliott moved to Roswell, New Mexico where he worked as a farmer and rancher. Elliott died on December 3, 1922, at White Plains, New York and was buried at Mount Pleasant Cemetery.

== See also ==
- List of American Civil War brevet generals (Union)
