= Daniel M. Krumrei =

United States Army general

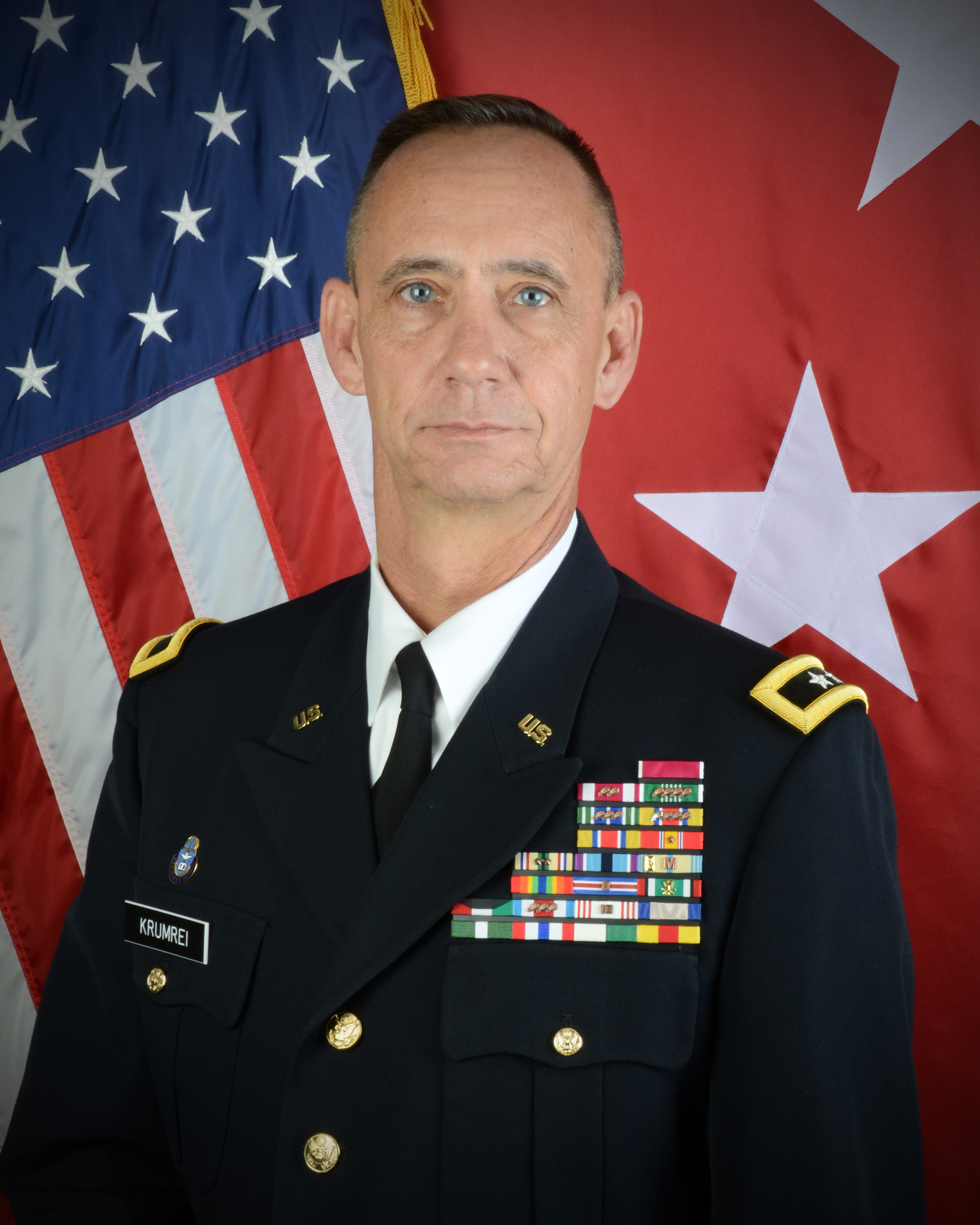
- Born: 1956 (age 69–70)
- Military career
- Allegiance: United States
- Branch: Army National Guard
- Rank: Major General

Major General Daniel M. Krumrei (born 1956) served as Adjutant General of the Illinois National Guard. Historically, he is the 38th person to serve as Illinois' adjutant general.

== Military career ==
Appointed by Governor Patrick Quinn in 2012, Krumrei was the first chaplain to head any state's National Guard having never before held a position of command. The appointment was immediately questioned by Lieutenant Colonel Grant Winsor Speece, a chaplain retired from the Minnesota Army National Guard, who correctly asserted in a letter to the editor that "it is inappropriate for a military chaplain to serve in a position of command".

Although reared in a religious home, Krumrei delayed baptism. Then, because of influence by Christians in the Wisconsin Army National Guard, of which at the time he was an enlisted soldier, Krumrei was baptized in 1977.

Krumrei has explicitly stated his positive impressions of the skills of women who serve in military roles. He swore in Alicia Tate-Nadeau, Illinois' first female Brigadier General.

Immediately before his appointment as adjutant general, Daniel Krumrei was minister of the Parkway Christian Church (Disciples of Christ) in Springfield, Illinois.

He retired from the National Guard on July 4, 2015. A retirement ceremony was held on August 7, 2015. He was succeeded by Brig. Gen. Richard J. Hayes Jr. of Chatham, Illinois, Adjutant General of the Illinois National Guard.

== Personal life ==
A graduate of the University of Wisconsin–Madison and Phillips Theological Seminary (from which he received a Master of Divinity degree), Krumrei is married to Mary Susan Krumrei (born 1957). They have three adult children.

== Awards and decorations ==
- Legion of Merit
- Meritorious Service Medal (with 2 Bronze Oak Leaf Clusters)
- Army Commendation Medal (with 4 Bronze Oak Leaf Clusters)
- Army Achievement Medal (with 3 Bronze Leaf Clusters)
- Army Reserve Component Achievement Medal (with 1 Silver Oak Leaf Cluster and 3 Bronze Oak Leaf Clusters)
- Army Reserve Component Achievement Medal
- National Defense Service Medal (with 1 Bronze Service Star)
- Southwest Asia Service Medal (with 2 Bronze Service Stars)
- Humanitarian Service Medal (Mississippi River Flood)
- Armed Forces Reserve Medal (with Gold Hourglass and M Device Army Service Ribbon)
- Army Reserve Components Overseas Training Ribbon (with Numeral 8)
- Kuwait Liberation Medal (Saudi Arabia)
- Kuwait Liberation Medal (Kuwait)
- Illinois Long and Honorable Service Medal (with 3 Bronze Oak Leaf Clusters)
- Illinois Military Attendance Ribbon (with Numeral 10)
- Illinois State Active Duty Ribbon
- Iowa Commendation Medal
- Iowa State Service Ribbon
- Oklahoma Long Service Ribbon
- Oklahoma Good Conduct Ribbon
