= Adjutant general of Illinois =

- Incumbent; Rodney C. Boyd since May, 4 2024

The adjutant general of Illinois is the senior officer of the Illinois Army National Guard, Illinois Air National Guard, and state defense forces of Illinois. The Illinois Naval Militia was also part of the adjutant general's command, until it was disbanded.

Major General Richard R. Neely is the 40th Adjutant General of the State of Illinois. He assumed the duties of the Adjutant General on 8 February 2019 upon the retirement of Major General Richard Hayes. He serves as a member of the Governor's Cabinet as the Director of the Illinois Department of Military Affairs and is the Governor's principal advisor on military matters. As the Adjutant General, he is responsible for carrying out Illinois National Guard missions in supporting civil authorities during domestic operations and emergency relief efforts, operational readiness and supporting U.S. military operations across the world. General Neely is the senior officer in the chain-of-command for both the Illinois Air and Army National Guard. He is responsible for the daily operations of the Illinois National Guard and oversees approximately 13,000 men and women in uniform (2,286 full time) and 230 civilian employees in the Illinois Department of Military Affairs. General Neely works closely with the leadership of National Guard Bureau and the Departments of the Army and Air Force.

Historically, the Adjutant General of Illinois also commands the state defense forces of Illinois, including the Illinois Reserve Militia and the Illinois Naval Militia.

== History ==
While the post dates back to territorial days, before the Civil War the position was, with the exception of the Black Hawk War, mainly honorary and the pay negligible. The Adjutant general was effectively the chief of the Governor's staff. As the Civil War broke out the post became important. Colonel Thomas S. Mather resigned to enter active service, and Judge Allen C. Fuller was appointed, remaining in office until 1 January 1865.

The office of Adjutant-General for the State of Illinois, as such, was created by act of the legislature on 2 February 1865.

The first appointee was Isham N. Haynie, who served until 1869, when he died in office. Reviewing the role in 1869, as the volunteer army had been mustered out, and the duties of the Adjutant General correspondingly decreased, the legislature reduced the size of the department and its funds. After the adoption of the 1877 military code, the Adjutant General again became prominent within the state government.

== Holders of the post ==
=== Territorial period ===
- Elias Rector
- Robert Morrison
- 1813-1814 - Benjamin Stephenson
- April 24, 1819 William Alexander

=== Statehood to Civil War ===
- April 24, 1819 – 1821 William Alexander
- June 11, 1821 – 1828 Elijah C. Berry
- December 19, 1828 – 1839 James W. Berry
- December 16, 1839 – 1857 Moses K. Anderson
- April 3, 1857 – 1857 Simon Bolivar Buckner
- December 9, 1857 – 1858 William C. Kinney
- October 28, 1858 – November 11, 1861 Thomas S. Mather

=== Civil War ===
- November 11, 1861 - January 1, 1865 Allen C. Fuller

=== Adjutant General for the State of Illinois ===
- January 16, 1865 – 1869: Isham N. Haynie
- March 24, 1869 – 1873: Hubert Dilger
- January 24, 1873 – 1875: Edwin L. Higgins
- July 2, 1875 – 1881: Hiram Hilliard
- August 1, 1881 – 1884: Isaac H. Elliott
- May 15, 1884 – 1891: Joseph W. Vance
- June 28, 1891 – 1893: Jasper N. Reece (also 1897-1902)
- January 20, 1893 – 1896: Alfred Orendorff
- January 4, 1896 – 1897: Charles C. Hilton
- February 2, 1897 – 1902: Jasper N. Reece (also 1891-1893)
- April 19, 1902 – 1903: James B. Smith (died in office)
- July 1, 1903 – 1909: Thomas W. Scott (died in office)
- January 1, 1910 – 1922: Frank S. Dickson
- February 7, 1922 – 1939: Carlos E. Black
- August 24, 1939 – 1940: Lawrence V. Regan
- November 8, 1940 – 1969: Leo Martin Boyle
- 1969-1978: Harold R. Patton
- 1983-1991: Harold G. Holesinger
- 1991-1995: Donald W. Lynn
- 1995-1999: Richard G. Austin
- 1999-2003: David C. Harris
- 2003-2007: Randal E. Thomas
- 2007-2012: William L. Enyart
- June 7, 2012 – December 21, 2012 : Dennis Celletti (acting)
- December 21, 2012 – June 8, 2015: Daniel M. Krumrei
- June 8, 2015 – February 15, 2019: Richard J. Hayes Jr.
- February 15, 2019 - May 4, 2024: Richard R. Neely
- May 4, 2024 - present: Rodney C. Boyd
