= General Boyle =

General Boyle may refer to:

- Charles Boyle, 4th Earl of Orrery (1674–1731), British Army major general
- Edmund Boyle, 8th Earl of Cork (1767–1856), British Army general
- Jean Boyle (born 1947), Royal Canadian Air Force general
- Jeremiah Boyle (1818–1871), Union Army brigadier general
- Leo Boyle (1899–1969), U.S. Army National Guard major general
- Richard Boyle, 2nd Viscount Shannon (1675–1740), British Army general
