= Richard G. Austin (politician) =

American politician

- Born: Richard Grant Austin; September 20, 1948 (age 78); Springfield, Illinois, US
- Military career
- Branch: United States Marine Corps, Illinois National Guard

Richard G. Austin (born September 20, 1948) is a politician from Illinois. He served as Adjutant general of Illinois.

== Early life ==
Richard Grant Austin was born September 20, 1948, in Springfield, Illinois.

== Education ==
Austin graduated from Lincoln Land Community College in 1971 with an Associate of Arts degree in political science and from Sangamon State University in 1973 with a Bachelor of Arts degree in political science. He also took graduate-level courses in public administration at Sangamon State.

== Military career ==
Austin served in the U.S. Marine Corps in the Marine Airwing from 1965–1969 and in the U.S. Marine Corps Reserve from 1969–1971. While on active duty he was deployed to Vietnam and earned eleven Air Medals. Austin subsequently served as an officer in the Illinois Army National Guard and served as Adjutant General of the State of Illinois from 1995 to 1999, when he was succeeded by David Harris. He was appointed major general in the Illinois National Guard and confirmed as a colonel in the United States Army Reserve.

== Political career ==
During the George Bush administration, Austin served as Administrator of the General Services Administration in Washington, DC.

Austin had an active career in regional and state government. He served in various capacities at the General Services Administration, including Deputy Administrator in 1988 and Regional Administrator in Chicago, IL from 1986 to 1988.

He served as chairman and chief executive officer of the Sangamon County Board from 1978–1986. He then served as division manager of the office of governmental services in the bureau of support services at the department of central management services for the State of Illinois from 1980–1986 and administrative assistant to Governor James R. Thompson from 1977–1980.

== Awards ==
In 1999, Austin received the Alumni Achievement Award from the University of Illinois Springfield.
