= Illinois Emergency Management Agency =

U.S. state government agency

Illinois Emergency Management Agency and Office of Homeland Security
Agency overview
- Formed: 1951
- Preceding agencies: Illinois Emergency Services and Disaster Agency (1975-1992); Illinois Civil Defense Agency (1951-1975)
- Jurisdiction: Illinois
- Headquarters: 2200 S. Dirksen Parkway, Springfield, Illinois
- Agency executive: Alicia Tate-Nadeau, Illinois Homeland Security Advisor
- Website: www.state.il.us/iema/

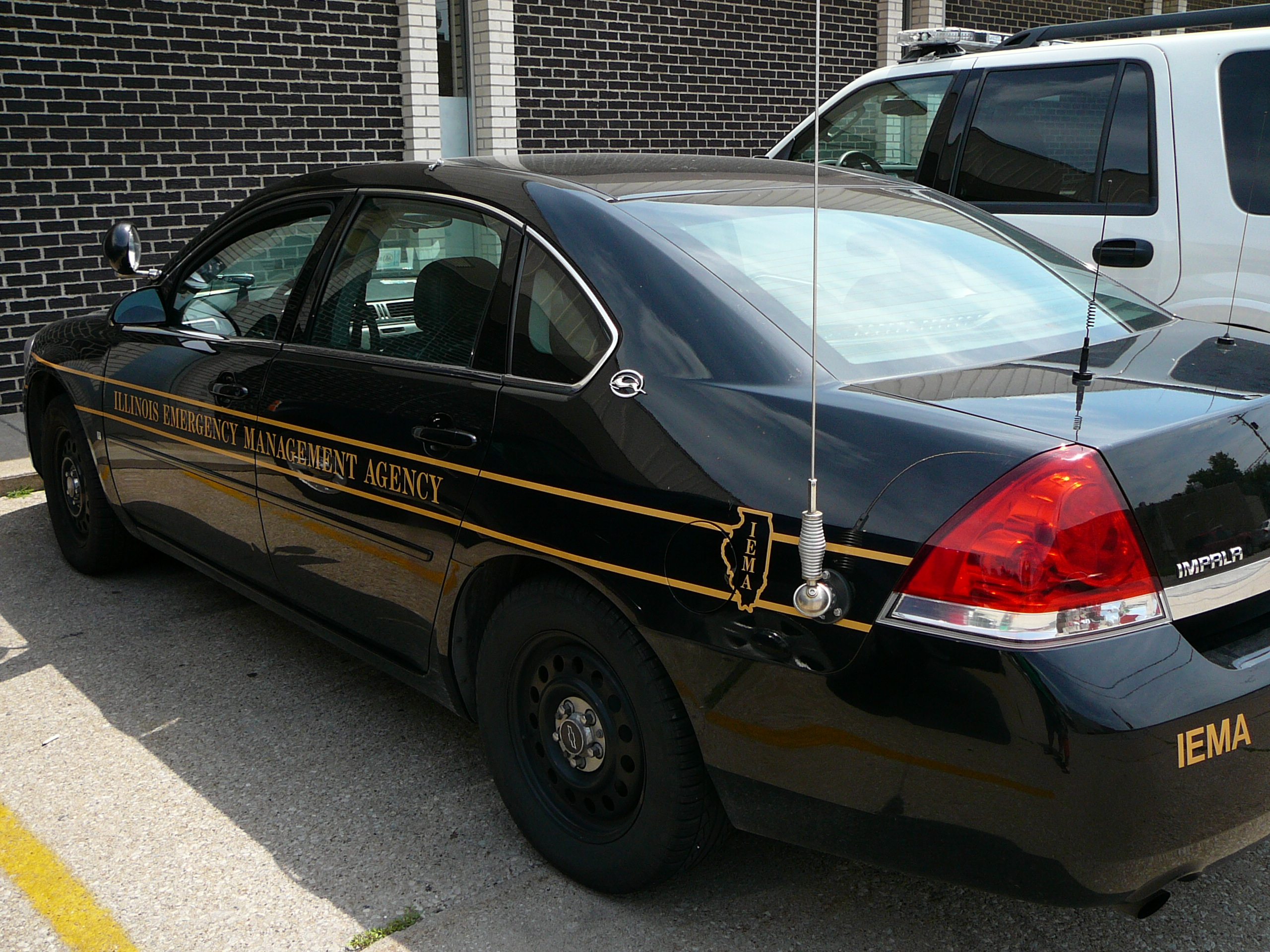
IEMA field Impala

Illinois Emergency Management Agency-Office of Homeland Security (IEMA-OHS) is an agency of the state of Illinois responsible for preparing for and coordinating responses to emergencies. It replaced the Illinois Civil Defense Agency in 1975 under House Bill 1109.

== Function ==
The primary responsibility of IEMA-OHS is to better prepare the State of Illinois for natural, man-made or technological disasters, hazards or acts of terrorism. IEMA-OHS coordinates the State's disaster mitigation, preparedness, response and recovery programs and activities, functions as the State Emergency Response Commission, and maintains a 24-hour Communication Center and State Emergency Operations Center (SEOC). The SEOC acts as lead in crisis/consequence management response and operations to notify, activate, deploy and employ state resources in response to any threat or act of terrorism. IEMA-OHS assists local governments with multi-hazard emergency operations plans and maintains the Illinois Emergency Operations Plan.
