= Randal E. Thomas =

American major general

Major General (ret) Randal E. Thomas
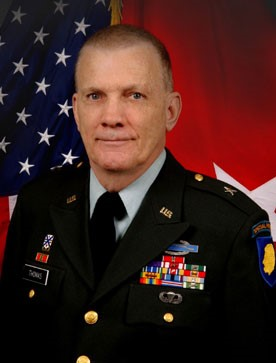
- Thomas as Adjutant General of Illinois (2006)
- Education: Southern Illinois University (B.S., 1973); Southern Illinois University (M.S.ed., 1980); U.S. Army War College (M.SS., 2002)
- Political party: Independent
- Military career
- Allegiance: United States of America
- Branch: Army National Guard
- Tenure: 1966 - 2007
- Rank: Major General
- Commands: 129th Regiment, Illinois Army National Guard; HHC 66th Brigade, 35th Infantry Division, Illinois Army National Guard
- Conflicts: Vietnam War

Randal E. Thomas is an American major general who was a member of the Army Special Forces in Vietnam from 1966 to 1969 and a member of the Illinois National Guard. Thomas graduated from Southern Illinois University Edwardsville in 1973 with a BS in English, and a MSed in 1980 in Instructional Technology. He also has a Master's of Strategic Studies from the U.S. Army War College. Thomas has been a member of the SIUE Hall of Fame since 2011.

Randal is from Glen Carbon, Illinois and he graduated from Collinsville High School. During his time serving in Vietnam, he was awarded a Purple Heart and a Bronze Star for valor in 1968–1969.

Thomas is also the Chairman of the Southern Illinois University Board of Trustees which governs the Carbondale campus, Edwardsville campus, School of Medicine in Springfield, and School of Dental Medicine in Alton. He was appointed to the board by Governor Pat Quinn.

== See also ==
- Illinois National Guard
- Adjutant general of Illinois
