= USRC Patrol =

Boat of the U.S. Revenue Cutter Service

History

United States
- Name: USRC (later USCGC) Patrol
- Launched: 1899
- Acquired: 2 June 1905
- Fate: Transferred to Illinois Naval Militia 31 August 1915

General characteristics
- Type: Harbor launch
- Length: 36 ft 3 in (11.05 m)

USRC Patrol, later USCGC Patrol, was a harbor launch in service in the United States Revenue Cutter Service from 1905 to 1915 and in the United States Coast Guard in 1915. She was the first vessel of the Revenue Cutter Service and Coast Guard to bear the name.

She was built at Jersey City, Illinois, and was launched in 1899. The Revenue Cutter Service acquired her on 2 June 1905 and employed her on anchorage duty at Chicago, Illinois, although she operated as far south at Hannibal, Missouri.

When the Revenue Cutter Service and United States Lifesaving Service merged in 1915 to form the Coast Guard, Patrol became a part of the new service as USCGC Patrol.

On 31 August 1915, the Coast Guard transferred Patrol to the Illinois Naval Militia at Chicago.
