= Leo Boyle =

United States Army general

Leo M. Boyle
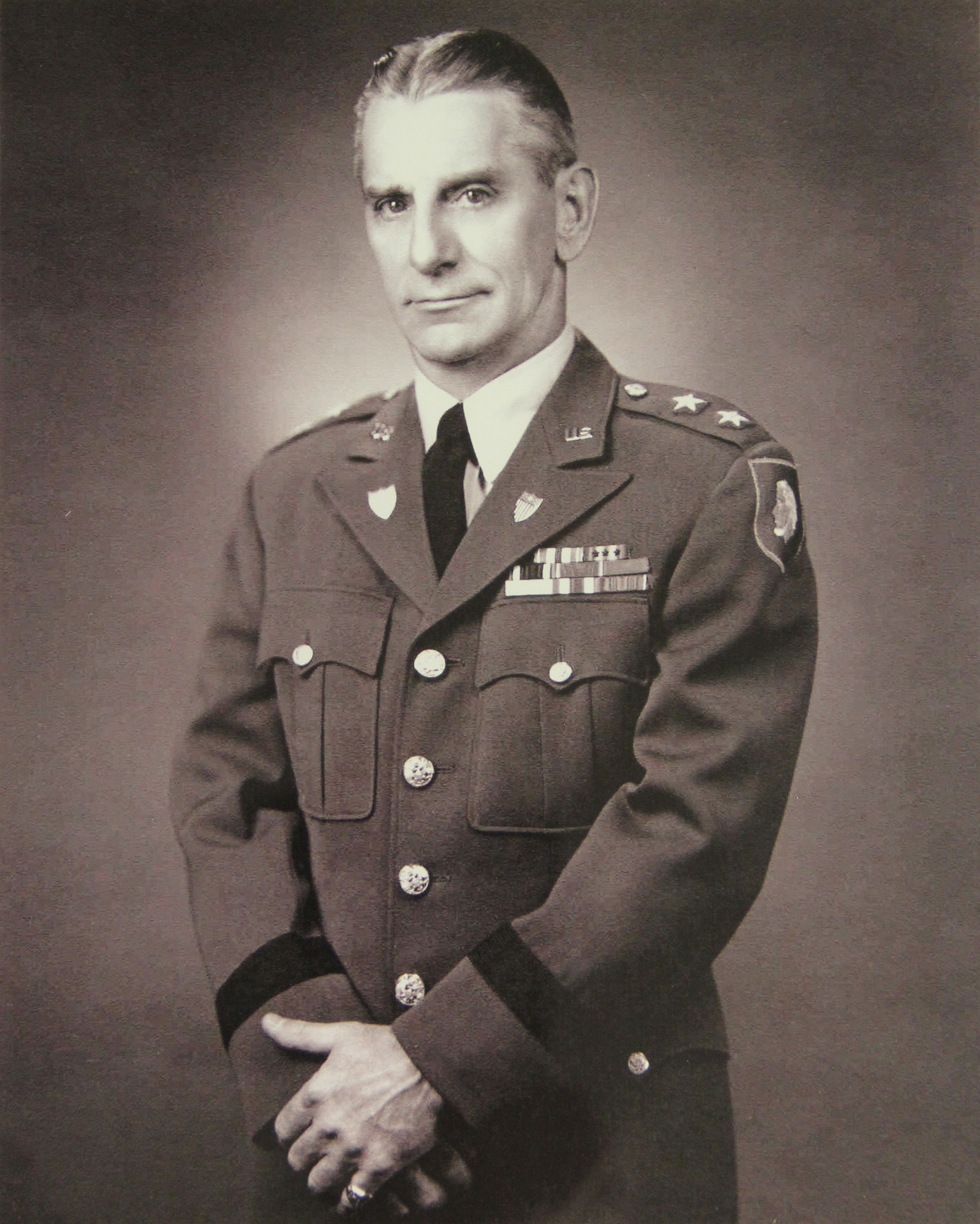
- Major General Leo M. Boyle
- Born: July 20, 1899; Chicago, Illinois, U.S.
- Died: May 3, 1969 (aged 69)
- Military career
- Allegiance: United States
- Branch: United States Army; United States Army National Guard
- Service years: 1916-1919; 1924-1969
- Rank: Major General
- Commands: Illinois National Guard
- Conflicts: Pancho Villa Expedition; World War I
- Awards: Silver Star

Major General Leo Martin Boyle (July 20, 1899 – May 3, 1969) was a senior United States Army and Illinois National Guard officer. He served as one of the longest adjutants general of Illinois, serving continuously from 1940 until three months prior to his death in 1969.

As the adjutant general, he was responsible for leading and coordinating the use of the Illinois National Guard in both territorial and federal matters.

== Career ==
Born in Chicago, Boyle first enlisted in the US Army and Illinois National Guard in 1916 at the age of seventeen, taking part in the Pancho Villa Expedition. From there he went on to serve with distinction in World War I, earning a Silver Star for gallantry.

In October 1924 he earned a commission as a second lieutenant in the 65th Infantry Brigade. He rose steadily through the ranks until he was appointed as assistant adjutant of the 33rd Division. It was in this position that as a captain he served with General George Marshall, who was assigned to the Illinois National Guard from 1933 until 1936 as the division's senior instructor.

Immediately prior to the outbreak of World War II, Boyle was appointed as the adjutant general of Illinois on 8 November 1940 and promoted to brigadier general by Illinois governor John Henry Stelle. He was further promoted to major general in 1945, becoming federally recognized in 1952. This federal recognition was withdrawn in July 1963 upon Boyle reaching the mandatory retirement age of 62; however, he continued to receive federal support for his role as adjutant general, attending several professional military courses well after his federal recognition was withdrawn. Boyle served in the role of adjutant general as a major general in the Illinois National Guard until his death in July 1969 of lung cancer and emphysema, conditions which he attributed to his wartime experiences in World War I.

Boyle was involved in a lawsuit over the controversial dismissal of another Illinois National Guard general, Major General Joseph Teece in 1951. He further provoked the ire of the active-duty Army when he directed the Illinois National Guard to begin training to respond to civil disturbances in addition to military training. He would later be exonerated in his beliefs when the Illinois National Guard was called up to quell the riots during the 1968 Democratic Convention.

Major General Boyle was one of only six generals in the history of the United States Army to have served as a general during three major conflicts, serving stateside during World War II as a brigadier general, and then stateside again during Korea and Vietnam as a major general. The other five were Brevet Lieutenant General Winfield Scott (War of 1812, Mexican War and Civil War), General of the Army Douglas MacArthur (World War I, World War II and Korea), Lieutenant General Milton Reckord (World War II, Korea, Vietnam), General Lewis Blaine Hershey (World War II, Korea, Vietnam), and General Hugh Shelton (Panama, Gulf War, War on Terror). His twenty-nine years of service as the commander of the Illinois National Guard is the longest tenure of any Illinois Adjutants General.

== Dates of rank ==
Insignia	Rank	Component	Dates
	Private	ARNG	1916
	Second Lieutenant	ARNG	October 1924
	First Lieutenant	ARNG	May 1925
	Captain	ARNG	March 1926
	Major	ARNG	May 1936
	Lieutenant Colonel (IL)	IL	28 April 1937
	Lieutenant Colonel	ARNG	9 July 1937
	Colonel	ARNG	Never Held
	Brigadier General	ARNG	8 November 1940
	Major General (IL)	IL	2 July 1945
	Major General	ARNG	November 1952 (withdrawn July 1963)
