= Battleship Illinois (replica) =

Full-sized ship mockup

Illinois
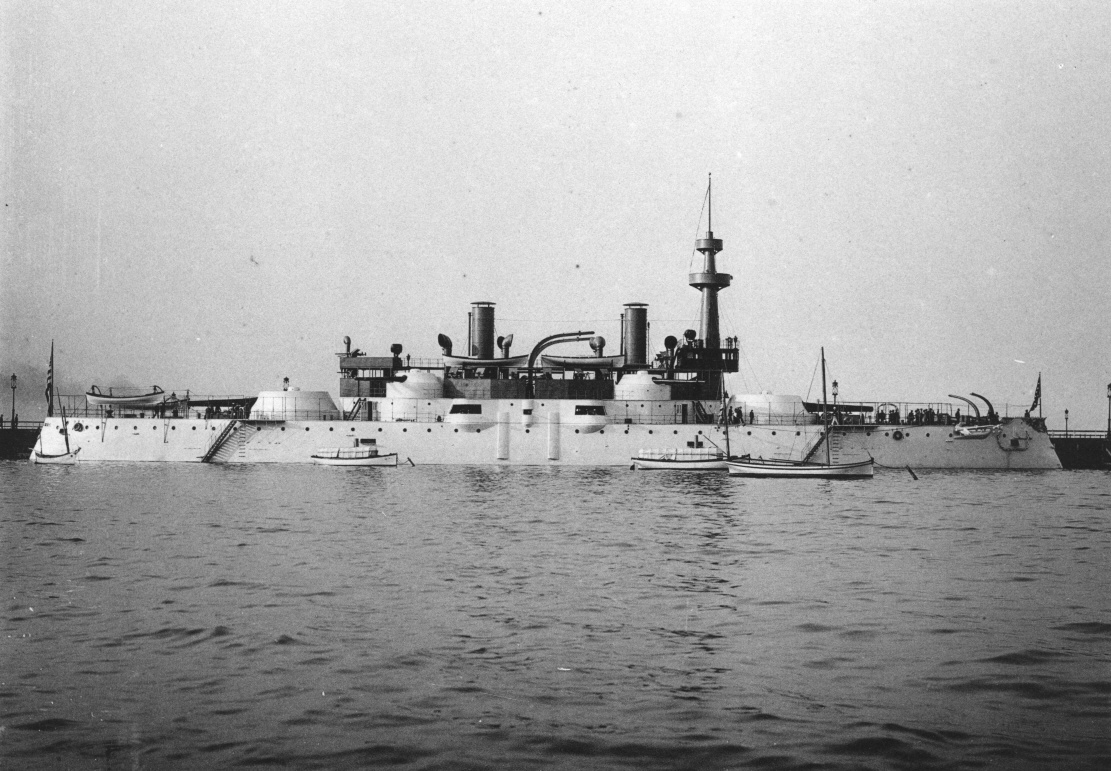
- Replica Battleship Illinois

General characteristics
- Length: 348 ft 11 in (106.35 m)
- Beam: 69 ft 3 in (21.11 m)
- Armament: four 13-inch (330 mm) guns (simulated); eight 8-inch guns (simulated); four 6-inch (150 mm) guns; twenty 6-pounder guns; six 1-pounder guns; two Gatling guns; Six torpedo tubes

Illinois was a detailed, full-scale mockup of an Indiana-class coastal defense battleship, constructed as a naval exhibit at the World's Columbian Exposition in Chicago, Illinois, United States, in 1893. It was built alongside a pier of stuccoed brick atop wood pilings, with a stucco covered wood-framed superstructure, and outfitted with limited mechanical systems and displays.

== Background ==
In the decade preceding the Columbian Exposition, the United States Navy initiated a fleet modernization program. Sometimes referred to as the 'New Navy', the first steel-hulled warships were constructed to replace the wooden and ironclad ships from the American Civil War period. In 1891, the first class of modern American battleships, the Indiana-class, was laid down. These warships included modern technologies absent in their Civil War-era predecessors, particularly electricity and electrically driven devices.

When the Columbian Exposition was being planned, it was decided to showcase this new naval technology. However, the Rush–Bagot Treaty forbade warships to operate on the Great Lakes. Furthermore, a battleship built on the Great Lakes would have been confined there for its entire existence because, prior to the opening of the Sanitary and Ship Canal in 1900, there was no way for it to leave. As a result, it was decided that a full-scale replica of a battleship would be constructed instead. This mock-up would permit the demonstration of new technologies being used in the Indiana-class warships. In keeping with the Navy's policy of naming battleships after states and in honor of the Exposition's location, the facsimile battleship was called Illinois.

== Construction ==
Illinois was constructed alongside a pier and gave the appearance that she was moored to the wharf. She was designed by architect Frank W. Grogan, and built at a cost of $100,000.

A foundation of pilings and heavy timbers were built in Lake Michigan, at the north-east corner of the exposition grounds. The sides of Illinois were constructed of brick, plastered with cement. The hull structure was carefully constructed to match the contour of the Indiana-class warships.

A superstructure, redoubts, barbettes, turrets and main and secondary guns were assembled using wood framing, covered with cement and metal lathing. Fittings and details, such as anchors, torpedo nets, davits, railings, and a multitude of other details, gave the appearance of a functioning warship. Within the superstructure were berthing spaces, cabins, galley, and other living spaces all constructed to emulate realistic living conditions on American battleships. As a result of the attention to detail, Illinois was a faithful reproduction of a coastal battleship.

== Exhibits ==
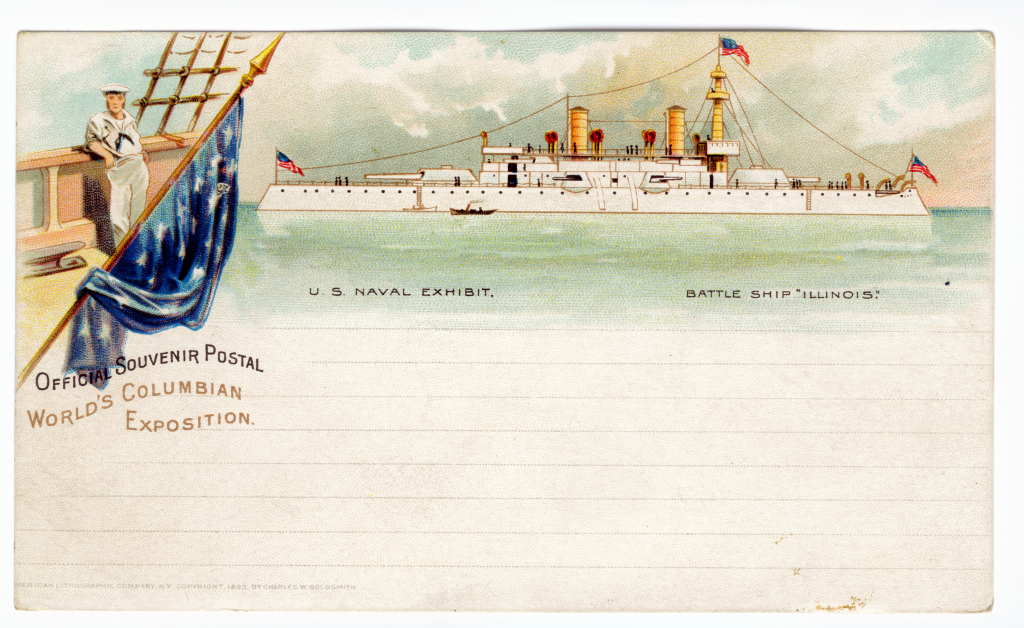
Postcard from the Columbian Exhibition of the Battleship Illinois

One objective of the Columbian Exposition was to highlight electric generation technologies, and Illinois was no exception.

Because the hull was solid, no machinery or compartments were placed below the berth deck, the level just below the main deck. Instead, an electrical plant was installed on the main deck to provide power to 350 16-candlepower lamps, two 38,000 candlepower search lights, and a few electrical motors.

Two 16 kilowatt marine generators were also installed on Illinois, and used to highlight their operation for visitors. However, the actual power for the ship came from a 500 volt, 50 horsepower (37 kW) motor. The wiring on Illinois was done in accordance to naval regulations and was completely watertight.

Illinois was equipped with a complete set of navigation and running lights. Two large searchlights were also demonstrated to visitors. Additionally, Illinois had two Sturtevant blowers, and used in an on-board machine shop.

== Crew ==
A detachment of officers, sailors, and marines, were assigned to the Illinois by the Navy Department. The crew performed standard drills and duties as they would on a functioning warship. In addition to the crew assigned by the navy, custodial staff were attired in historic naval uniforms used between 1776 and 1848. Illinois was commanded by Commodore Richard Worsam Meade, and the Executive Officer was Lieutenant Commander E.D. Taussig, who would later claim Wake Island during the Spanish–American War.

== Disposition ==
Plans were made to move Illinois seven miles (11 km) north to the waterfront at the foot of Van Buren street, upon completion of the exposition. After the move, the Illinois was to serve as the headquarters for the newly formed Illinois Naval Militia. Despite skepticism that moving her was feasible, some foundation pilings were reportedly laid down at the new location starting 13 June 1894.

However, this plan was never fully realized, and like many of the other buildings constructed for the Columbian Exposition, Illinois was dismantled some time after the expo closed October 1893.

The bell of the Illinois is currently on display at Navy Pier in Chicago and is placed near the Smith Museum of Stained Glass Windows by the Richard H. Driehaus Museum Gallery of Stained Glass.

== See also ==
- Viking (replica Viking longship): Also on display at the World's Columbian Exposition
