= Illinois Department of Revenue =

U.S. state code department

Department of Revenue
Department overview
- Jurisdiction: Illinois
- Department executive: David Harris, Director
- Website: tax.illinois.gov

The Illinois Department of Revenue (IDOR) is a department of the Illinois state government that collects state taxes, operates the Illinois State Lottery, oversees the state's casino industry, oversees the state's thoroughbred and harness horse racing industries, and regulates the distribution of alcoholic beverages throughout Illinois, including beer, wine, and liquor. It is headquartered at the Willard Ice Building, 101 West Jefferson in Springfield, Illinois.

== History ==
The Illinois Department of Revenue has increased in size in line with the creation of new taxes within the state and the expansion of existing taxes. A gasoline tax was enacted in Illinois in 1927, the sales tax was enacted in 1933; the state income tax was enacted in 1969, and the first lottery tickets were sold in 1974 in the state capital of Springfield.

In the 2007 fiscal year, the Illinois Department of Revenue expected to collect $24.6 billion in taxes and gambling revenues, about five-sixths of the state's general funds revenues for the year. IDOR expected to keep $1.0 billion of this sum (4.0%) to cover the costs of its own operations, and expected to transfer the rest to the office of the Illinois State Treasurer to pay for the ongoing operations of the state.

== Organization ==
The Illinois Department of Revenue collects taxes on its own behalf and oversees the operations of three quasi-independent state boards and commissions, as follows:

- The Illinois Gaming Board regulates Illinois casinos

The Illinois Gaming Board/IGB uses sworn officers from the Illinois Department of Revenue - Bureau of Criminal Investigations (Special Agents) and Illinois State Police (Troopers) to staff the nine Riverboat Offices throughout the state as well as the IGB Headquarters in Chicago and Des Plaines.
Agents are responsible for conducting licensing and background investigations regarding casino ownership, management, employees, and suppliers associated with the Gaming industry. Agents investigate thefts, embezzlements, cheating, and illegal modifications of gaming devices as well as a host of other criminal activities. The IGB also enforces all regulations of the Riverboat Gambling Act and the Illinois Compiled Statutes.
Monitoring and regulating this industry has proved extraordinarily important to the State. More than 15 million individual admissions to the casinos are recorded annually, and total adjusted gross receipts exceed $1.7 billion on a yearly basis.;

- The Illinois Racing Board regulates Illinois horse racetracks;
- The Illinois Liquor Control Commission regulates the distribution of alcoholic beverages in Illinois.

== Today ==
In 2018, IDOR Launched a Statewide Electronic Lien Registry in order to provide a single-source to locate all active liens and releases filed by the department.

== See also ==
- Illinois Department of the Lottery
