= Illinois Department of Military Affairs =

State of Illinois National Guard administrative unit

Department of Military Affairs
Department overview
- Jurisdiction: Illinois

The Illinois Department of Military Affairs is the code department of the Illinois state government that oversees units of the National Guard when they are stationed in Illinois. The department also serves as the back-office military link between Illinois and the United States Department of Defense (USDOD), including coordination between USDOD and Guards units and their families when Illinois units and sub-units are on federal service. National Guard activities within Illinois include both the Illinois Army National Guard and the Illinois Air National Guard.
