= Richard Hayes (general) =

US Army National Guard officer

Richard J. Hayes Jr.
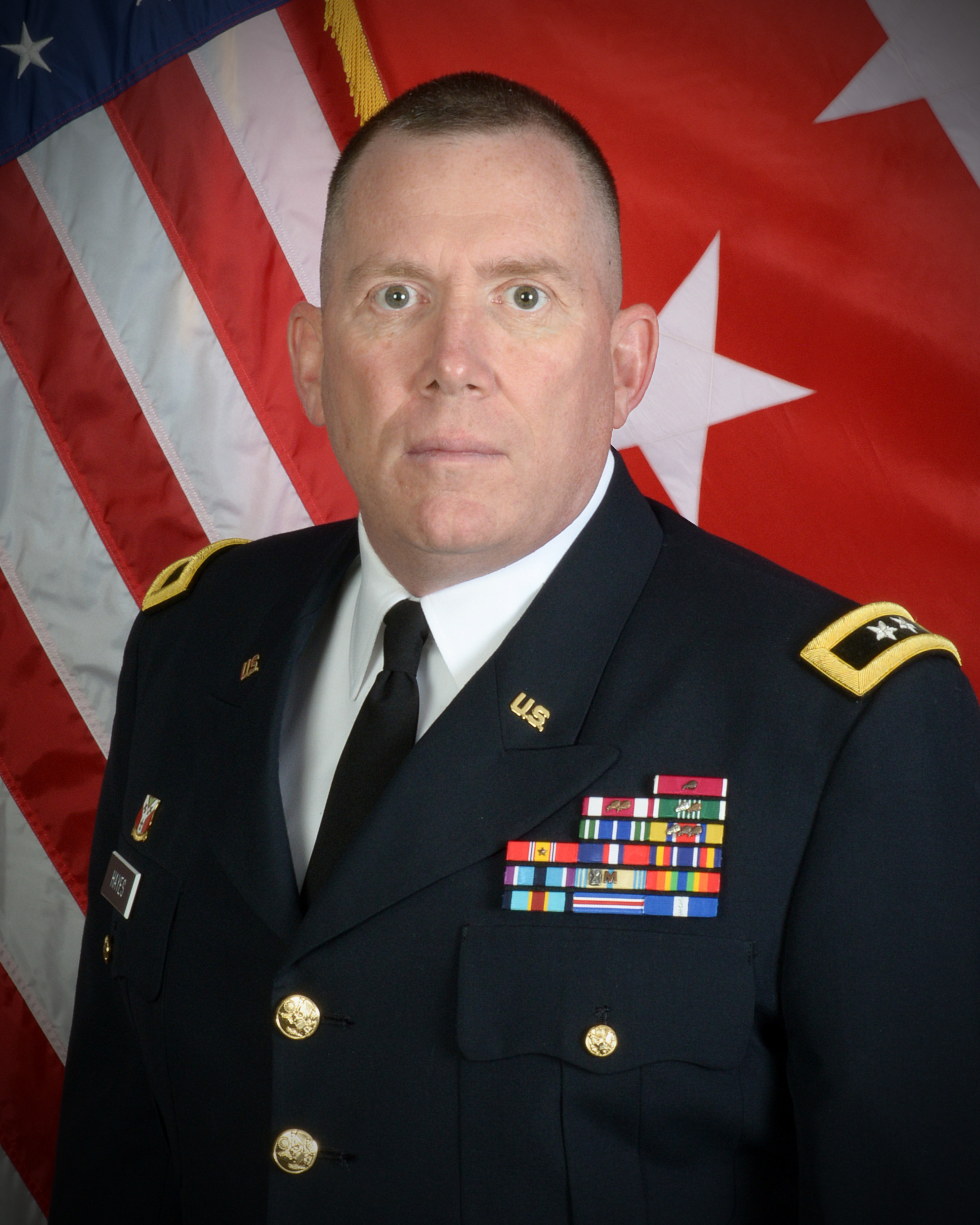
- Hayes in 2015
- Spouse: Danette
- Military career
- Allegiance: United States
- Service years: 1987–2019
- Rank: Major General
- Unit: Army National Guard
- Commands: C Battery, 2nd Battalion, 122nd Field Artillery Regiment; 2nd Battalion, 122nd Field Artillery Regiment; 129th Regiment (Regional Training Institute); Illinois National Guard
- Awards: Legion of Merit (2); Meritorious Service Medal (3); Army Commendation Medal (7)
- Other work: Vice President and General Manager, Middough, Inc.

Richard J. Hayes Jr. is a retired U.S. Army National Guard officer, who served as the adjutant general of Illinois. He was appointed by Governor of Illinois Bruce Rauner in 2015.

As adjutant general, Hayes served as the highest-ranking member of the Illinois National Guard. He serves as the director of the Illinois Department of Military Affairs in the governor's cabinet and is the principal advisor on military matters for the governor, who is the commander-in-chief of the guard.

== Military career ==
Hayes joined in the Reserve Officer Training Corps at the University of Kansas. He received his commission as a second lieutenant in 1987. Upon release from Active Duty Hayes joined the Kansas Army National Guard's First Battalion, 127th Field Artillery Regiment. Lieutenant Hayes then transferred to the Illinois Army National Guard's Second Battalion, 122nd Field Artillery Regiment, two years later. In March 1992, he was promoted to the rank of captain and later assumed command of C Battery, based in Chicago, Illinois. By October 1994, Captain Hayes was assigned to the battalion's headquarters where he served as the logistics officer (S4) and later served as planning and operations officer (S3) until he became executive officer in 1999. Three years later, Hayes became commander of the 2nd Battalion, 122nd Field Artillery Regiment, based in Chicago, Illinois, and was promoted to lieutenant colonel.

After leading a reinforced Task Force 122 in October 2005, the state's contribution to the relief efforts in New Orleans, Louisiana, after Hurricane Katrina and Hurricane Rita, Hayes became Assistant Chief of Staff, G3 Operations, for the 35th Infantry Division, based in Fort Leavenworth, Kansas, two months later. Colonel Hayes was deployed to Kosovo for a year in 2007–2008 where he served as the deputy commander for maneuver of Task Force Falcon, of the Multinational Task Force-East. He then became the director of operations (J3), of the Joint Force Headquarters, Illinois National Guard, based in Springfield, Illinois. In 2010, Hayes assumed command of the 129th Regiment (Regional Training Institute).

In August 2012, Colonel Hayes was promoted to brigadier general and became director of the Joint Staff. Less than a year later, he was concurrently assigned as the deputy adjutant general. He was relieved as the director of the Joint Staff in February 2015 and was assigned as the assistant adjutant general – army. On 8 June, Governor Rauner appointed him as the state's adjutant general and he was promoted to major general on 5 August.

Hayes retired on March 9, 2019.

== Civilian career ==
Hayes has spent 27 years in the engineering and construction industries.

== Personal life ==
Hayes graduated in 1986 with a bachelor's degree in geography from the University of Kansas. He received a Bachelor of Business Administration in Management from the Touro University International in 2003. He also received a Master of Strategic Studies from the United States Army War College in 2007.
