= Jules Loh =

American journalist (1931–2010)

- Born: May 29, 1931; Macon, Georgia, US
- Died: August 29, 2010 (aged 79); Tappan, New York, US
- Education: Georgetown University
- Occupation: Journalist
- Years active: 1959–1997
- Employer: Associated Press
- Family: John M. Loh (brother); Michael A. Loh (nephew)

Jules Edward Loh (May 29, 1931 – August 29, 2010) was an American journalist who worked for almost 40 years as a reporter and feature writer for the Associated Press (AP). Loh was born on May 29, 1931, in Macon, Georgia. He served in the United States Air Force during the Korean War, then attended Georgetown University in Washington, D.C. and worked for The Washington Post. In the mid-1950s, he reported for the Waco Tribune-Herald and The Texas Observer. In 1959, he joined the AP's Louisville, Kentucky, office. Loh was reassigned to the New York office in 1960.

In New York, Loh joined a group of feature writers known as the Poets' Corner. The AP general manager Wes Gallagher founded the Poets' Corner in the 1960s. Members of the group, including the journalists Sid Moody, Hal Boyle, and Saul Pett, "specialized in stories that explored news topics at length and in detail that belied the AP's image as strictly a hard-news agency".

Loh reported on the civil rights movement in the 1960s. He was on-the-ground for the 1963 16th Street Baptist Church bombing in Birmingham, Alabama, where he reported on the funerals of four girls who were killed by the blast. That same year, Loh had a front-row seat for Martin Luther King Jr.'s "I Have a Dream" speech in Washington, D.C. He also marched with King and reported on the Selma to Montgomery marches in 1965. Shortly after the assassination of Malcolm X, Loh wrote that X had told him that "his own people would kill him".

Parallel to his coverage of the Civil Rights Movement, Loh reported on George Wallace's campaign during the 1964 Democratic Party presidential primaries. Loh was invited to travel with Wallace on a road trip through Indiana, capturing Wallace's apprehension about his rhetoric and ability to confront hostile audiences, as well as voters' perceptions. Matthew E. Welsh, who was the governor of Indiana during the 1964 Democratic presidential primaries, called Loh's reporting the "most perceptive picture of Wallace the campaigner". Later in the 1960s, Loh covered the assassinations of the United States President John F. Kennedy, and his brother, the Attorney General and presidential candidate Bobby Kennedy; the assassination attempt on Wallace; and the United States space program.

In 1971, Loh published a book under Crowell-Collier Press called Lords of the Earth: A History of the Navajo Indians. The book received mixed reviews. His AP colleague John Barbour praised Loh's "vivid and gentle ... understanding of the Navajo". Editha L. Watson in the Navajo Times likewise praised Loh for his sensitivity toward the Navajo people and his storytelling ability. The historian William H. Lyon, by contrast, called the book superficial in its analysis and criticized it for its disorganized, sometimes off-topic historical narrative and lack of citations.

From 1976 to 1982, Loh wrote a column called "Elsewhere in America", which was published twice a week. Loh used the column to tell stories "about unusual people and places". He retired from the AP in June of 1997. That same year, Charlotte Grimes writing in the American Journalism Review called him one of "journalism's giants". Loh died on August 29, 2010 (aged 79) in Tappan, New York, of complications from abdominal surgery.
