= John M. Loh =

US Air Force general

John Michael Loh
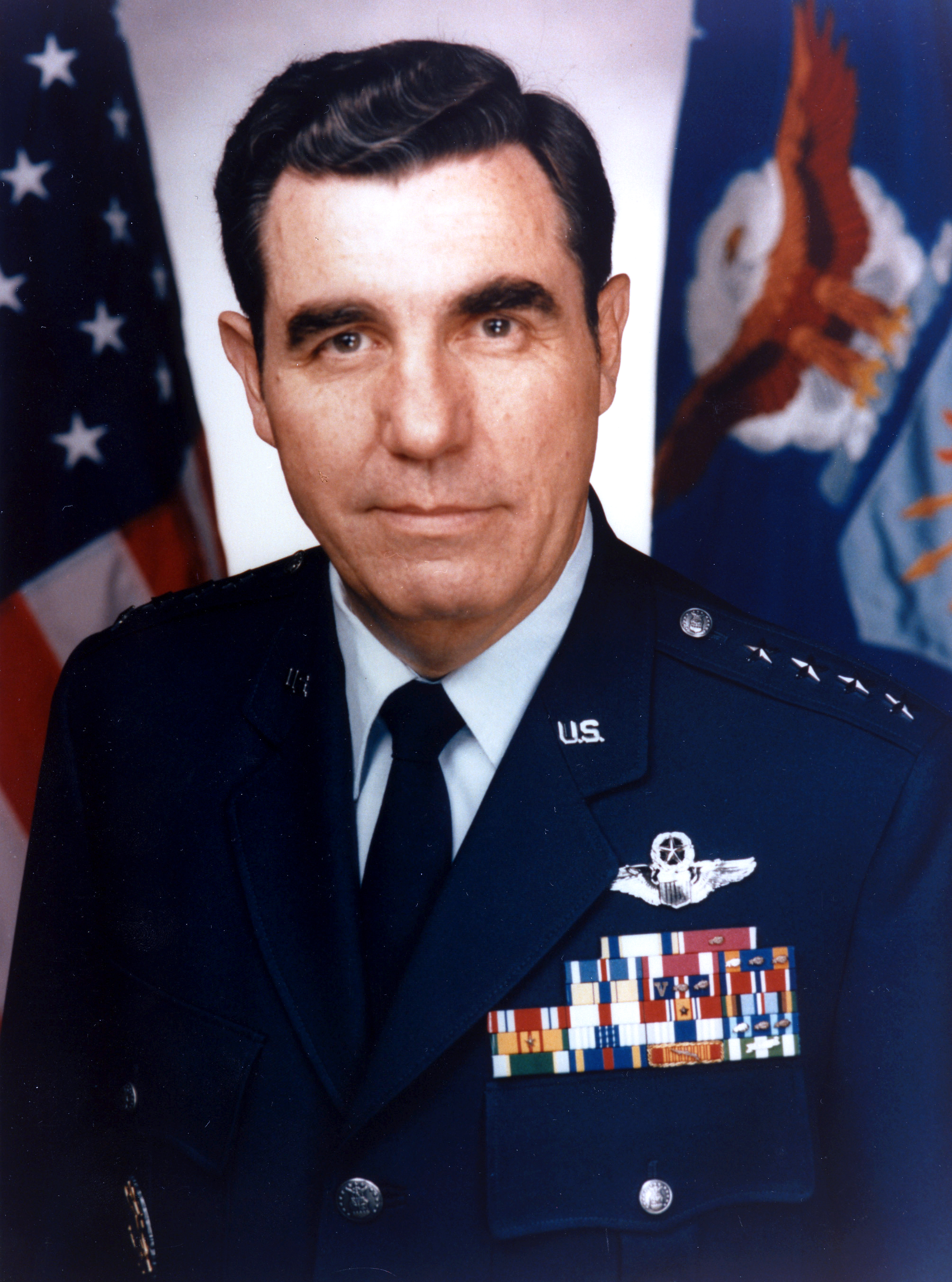
- General John Michael Loh, circa 1992
- Born: March 14, 1938 (age 88); Washington, D.C., U.S.
- Relatives: Lieutenant General Michael A. Loh (son); Jules Loh (brother)
- Military career
- Allegiance: United States
- Branch: United States Air Force
- Service years: 1960–1995
- Rank: General
- Commands: Air Combat Command; Tactical Air Command; Vice Chief of Staff of the Air Force; Aeronautical Systems Division
- Conflicts: Vietnam War
- Awards: Air Force Distinguished Service Medal; Legion of Merit (2); Distinguished Flying Cross

John Michael Loh (born March 14, 1938) is a retired four-star general in the United States Air Force (USAF) who last served as Commander, Air Combat Command from June 1992 to July 1995. His other four-star assignment include being the 24th Vice Chief of Staff of the Air Force from June 1990 to March 1991, and Commander, Tactical Air Command from March 1991 to June 1992.

Loh graduated from Gonzaga College High School, Washington, D.C., in 1956 and the United States Air Force Academy in 1960. He has a master's degree in aeronautical engineering from Massachusetts Institute of Technology. He commanded the Aeronautical Systems Division, Air Force Systems Command. He also commanded Tactical Air Command, then upon its deactivation, became the first commander of Air Combat Command. He is a command pilot with more than 4,300 flying hours, primarily in fighter aircraft, and flew 204 combat missions in the Vietnam War. Loh retired from the USAF on July 1, 1995. He founded JML & Associates, Inc. the same year.

== Education ==
- 1956 Graduated from Gonzaga College High School, Washington, D.C.
- 1960 Received a Bachelor of Science degree in Engineering Science, U.S. Air Force Academy, Colorado Springs, Colorado
- 1966 U.S. Air Force Fighter Weapons School, Nellis Air Force Base, Nevada
- 1968 U.S. Air Force Test Pilot School, Edwards Air Force Base, California
- 1973 Received a Master of Science degree in Aeronautical Engineering, Massachusetts Institute of Technology, Massachusetts
- 1978 Air War College, Maxwell Air Force Base, Alabama

== Assignments ==
- June 1960 – January 1961, student officer, primary pilot training, Bainbridge Air Force Base, Georgia
- January 1961 – October 1961, student officer, basic pilot training, Craig Air Force Base, Alabama
- October 1961 – July 1962, student officer, intercept pilot training, Perrin Air Force Base, Texas
- July 1962 – June 1963, pilot, 76th Fighter Interceptor Squadron, Westover Air Force Base, Massachusetts
- September 1965 – April 1966, pilot, 33rd Tactical Fighter Wing, Eglin Air Force Base, Florida
- April 1966 – July 1967, pilot, 40th Tactical Fighter Squadron, Eglin Air Force Base, Florida
- July 1967 – October 1968, test pilot, USAF Test Pilot School, Edwards Air Force Base, California
- October 1968 – November 1969, pilot, 389th Tactical Fighter Squadron, 366th Tactical Fighter Wing, Da Nang Air Base, South Vietnam
- November 1969 – May 1972, fighter requirements staff officer, Fighter Division, Directorate of Operational Requirements, Office of the Deputy Chief of Staff, Research and Development, Headquarters U.S. Air Force, Washington, D.C.
- June 1972 – August 1973, graduate student, Aeronautical Engineering, Massachusetts Institute of Technology
- August 1973 – January 1975, YF-16/YF-17 program manager, Headquarters Aeronautical Systems Division, Wright-Patterson Air Force Base, Ohio
- January 1975 – July 1977, director of projects, F-16 Program, Aeronautical Systems Division, Wright-Patterson Air Force Base, Ohio
- August 1977 – June 1978, student, Air War College, Maxwell Air Force Base, Alabama
- June 1978 – July 1979, assistant deputy commander for operations, 23rd Tactical Fighter Wing, England Air Force Base, Louisiana
- July 1979 – September 1980, deputy commander for operations, 23rd Tactical Fighter Wing, England Air Force Base, Louisiana
- October 1980 – April 1981, vice commander, 23rd Tactical Fighter Wing, England Air Force Base, Louisiana
- April 1981 – April 1983, assistant deputy chief of staff for requirements, Headquarters Tactical Air Command, Langley Air Force Base, Virginia
- April 1983 – July 1984, assistant deputy chief of staff for operations, Headquarters Tactical Air Command, Langley Air Force Base, Virginia
- July 1984 – July 1985, deputy chief of staff for requirements, Headquarters Tactical Air Command, Langley Air Force Base, Virginia
- August 1985 – July 1987, director of operational requirements, Office of the Deputy Chief of Staff for Research, Development and Acquisition, Headquarters U.S. Air Force, Washington, D.C.
- July 1987 – July 1988, vice commander, Aeronautical Systems Division, Wright-Patterson Air Force Base, Ohio
- August 1988 – June 1990, commander, Aeronautical Systems Division, Wright-Patterson Air Force Base, Ohio
- June 1990 – March 1991, vice chief of staff, Headquarters U.S. Air Force, Washington, D.C.
- March 1991 – June 1992, commander, Headquarters Tactical Air Command, Langley Air Force Base, Virginia
- June 1992 – July 1995, commander, Air Combat Command, Langley Air Force Base, Virginia

== Major awards and decorations ==
- Air Force Distinguished Service Medal
- Legion of Merit with oak leaf cluster
- Distinguished Flying Cross
- Meritorious Service Medal
- Air Medal with seven oak leaf clusters
- Air Force Commendation Medal
- Vietnam Service Medal with silver service star
- Vietnam Gallantry Cross Unit Citation

== Other achievements ==
Loh was awarded the Daedalian Fellowship for graduate study in 1972. Also, he is the recipient of the 1972 Air Force Research and Development Award, and the Air Force's Eugene M. Zuckert Senior Management Award for 1989. In 2009 he honored by the United States Air Force Academy with their Distinguished Graduate award.

== Effective dates of promotion ==
Rank	Date
Second lieutenant	June 8, 1960
First lieutenant	December 8, 1961
Captain	December 8, 1964
Major	September 1, 1970
Lieutenant colonel	May 1, 1974
Colonel	May 1, 1979
Brigadier general	June 1, 1984
Major general	October 1, 1985
Lieutenant general	August 1, 1988
General	June 1, 1990

Military offices
Preceded by Monroe W. Hatch Jr.	Vice Chief of Staff of the United States Air Force; 1990–1991	Succeeded by Michael P.C. Carns
Preceded by Michael Dugan	Chief of Staff of the United States Air Force; 1990; Acting	Succeeded by Merrill A. McPeak
Preceded by Robert D. Russ	Commander, Tactical Air Command; 1991–1992	Succeeded by Position abolished
Preceded by Position established	Commander, Air Combat Command; 1992–1995	Succeeded by Joseph Ralston
