= Allen C. Fuller =

American politician

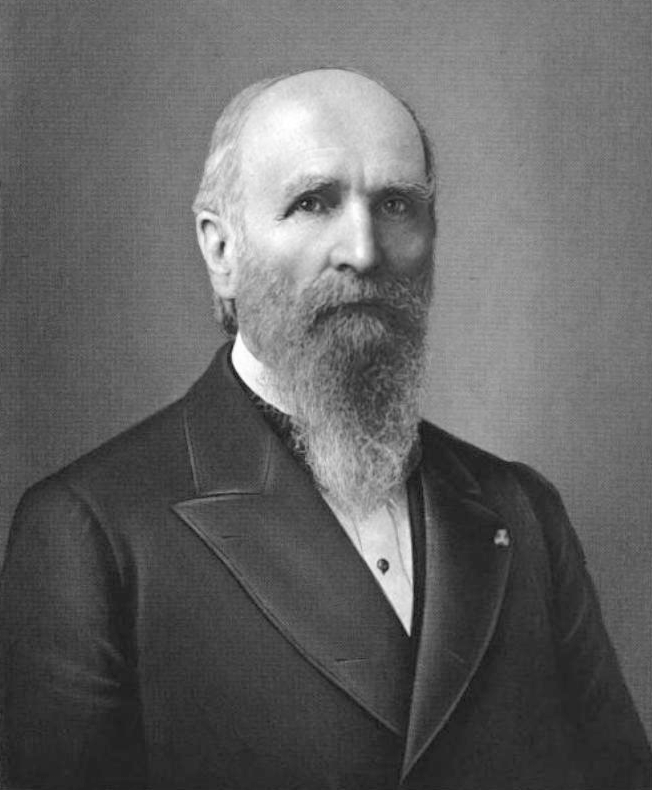
- Born: September 24, 1822; Farmington, Connecticut
- Died: December 6, 1901 (aged 79); Belvidere, Illinois
- Military career
- Rank: Adjutant General
- Conflicts: American Civil War
- Other work: Speaker of the Illinois House of Representatives

Adjutant General Allen Curtis Fuller (September 24, 1822 – December 6, 1901) was the adjutant general of Illinois from November 11, 1861, to January 1, 1865, during the American Civil War.

== Biography ==
Allen C. Fuller was born in Farmington, Connecticut, in 1822. He studied in Towanda, Pennsylvania, and under James Rood Doolittle in Warsaw, New York. He became a lawyer and lived in Belvidere, Illinois, from 1846 until his death at his home there in 1901. His daughter, Ida Candace Fuller Hovey, was born July 6, 1859, and married Theron Adelbert Hovey on July 6, 1878. She died of consumption (now more commonly called tuberculosis) at the age of 24 in Bayfield, Wisconsin, on August 22, 1883, after battling the sickness for several months. General Fuller then donated $5,000 to the city of Belvidere in Illinois to build a public library in her honor. To this day it's still open and standing.

From before the war until July 1862, he was a judge of the Illinois Circuit Courts. He served as Adjutant General of Illinois from 1862 until 1865. After the war, he was elected as the representative of Boone County in the Illinois House of Representatives. He became Speaker of the House, and afterwards served two terms in the Illinois Senate from 1867 until 1872.

In 1890, he built a Queen Anne style summer house near Lake Superior in Bayfield, Wisconsin, in search of relief for his asthma or hay fever. The house is now known as the "Old Rittenhouse Inn".

== Legacy ==
Fuller was eponymised in Camp Fuller.
