= Lords of the Earth: A History of the Navajo Indians =

1971 book by Jules Loh

- Cover of the book
- Author: Jules Loh
- Cover artist: Paul Conklin
- Language: English
- Subject: Navajo Nation
- Genre: Non-fiction
- Publisher: Crowell-Collier Press
- Publication date: 1971
- Publication place: United States
- Pages: 164
- OCLC: 161215

Lords of the Earth: A History of the Navajo Indians is a non-fiction book by Jules Loh. The book is a history of the Navajo Nation in Arizona, United States. The book was published by Crowell-Collier Press in 1971. It received mixed reviews.

== Reception ==
Lords of the Earth received mixed reception. Loh's AP colleague John Barbour praised Loh's "vivid and gentle ... understanding of the Navajo". Editha L. Watson in The Navajo Times likewise praised Loh for his sensitivity toward the Navajo people and his storytelling ability. The historian William H. Lyon, by contrast, called the book superficial in its analysis and criticized it for its disorganized, sometimes off-topic historical narrative and lack of citations.
