= Joseph W. Vance =

Joseph Wampler Vance
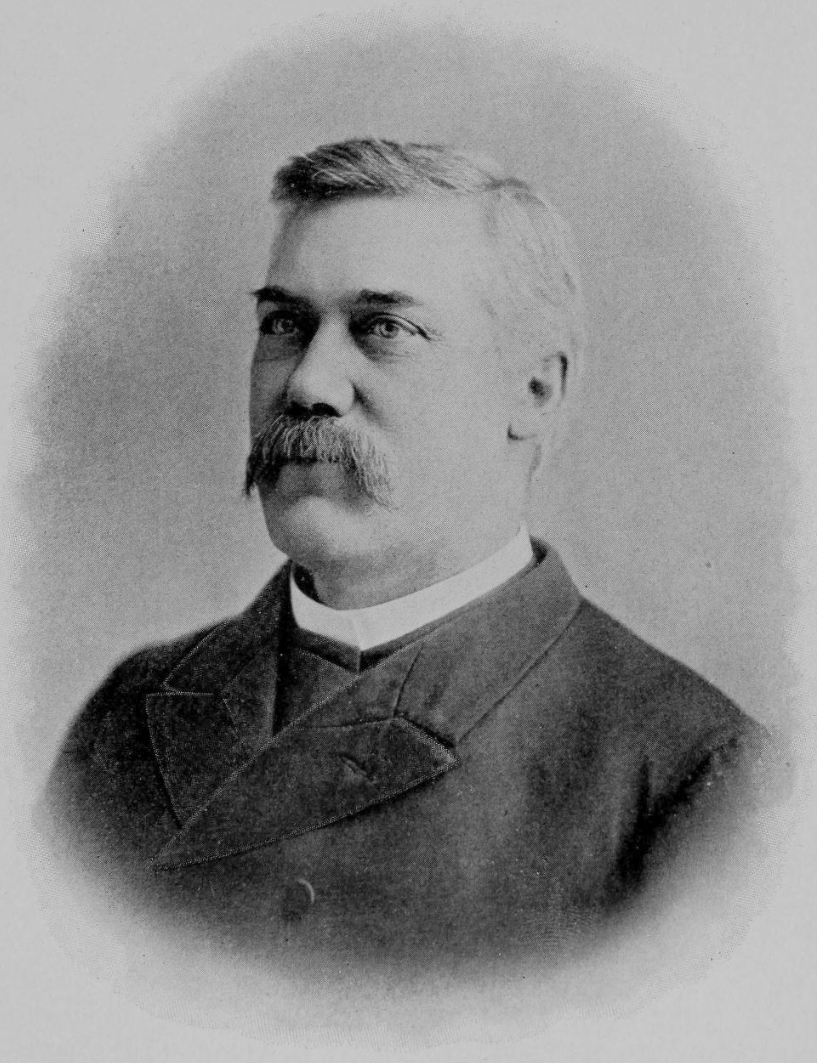
- Born: May 21, 1841; Paris, Illinois, U.S.
- Died: December 14, 1927 (aged 86); Los Angeles, California, U.S.
- Burial place: Inglewood Park Cemetery.
- Military career
- Allegiance: United States
- Branch: Union army
- Commands: 21st Regiment Illinois Volunteer Infantry; 2nd Brigade, 2nd Division, XX Corp; Company D of the 9th Infantry; Company C of the 17th Infantry
- Conflicts: American Civil War: Battle of Liberty Gap; Battle of Chickamauga

Signature
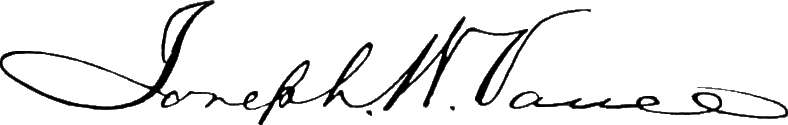

Joseph Wampler Vance (May 21, 1841 – December 14, 1927) was an American soldier from Illinois. Educated at the United States Military Academy, Vance was named a tactical instructor of Union troops upon the outbreak of the Civil War. He served alongside William Rosecrans as Acting Assistant Adjutant General, then as Aide-de-Camp to William Carlin. Vance participated in the battles of Fredericktown, Farmington, Liberty Gap, Chickamauga, Lookout Mountain, Missionary Ridge, Resaca, and Kennesaw Mountain. Following the war, Vance helped to found the Illinois National Guard, eventually rising to become Adjutant General of Illinois (1884–1891).

== Biography ==
Joseph Wampler Vance was born in Paris, Illinois, on May 21, 1841. He descended from an early American family; his great-grandfather was killed at the Battle of Kings Mountain during the Revolutionary War. Vance attended public schools, then attended Edgar Academy and the United States Military Academy. When the Civil War broke out, Vance was named First Lieutenant of Company F, 7th Congressional District Regiment of Illinois. Vance was also assigned as the Tactical Instructor of the regiment. Weeks later, the regiment was reorganized as the 21st Illinois Volunteer Infantry Regiment, the unit led by then-colonel Ulysses S. Grant. Grant recommended Vance to Gen. John Pope, who sent him to organize and train two regiments in St. Charles, Missouri. Returning to the 21st Illinois Volunteers, Vance fought in the Battle of Fredericktown in October.

In 1862, Vance was appointed Acting Assistant Adjutant General to Gen. William Rosecrans during the Tullahoma Campaign. He fought at the Battle of Farmington during the Siege of Corinth. Vance was then tasked with command of Bardstown, Kentucky from October 1862 to January 1863, defending it from a Confederate cavalry raid. In March, Vance was promoted to Assistant Inspector General of 2nd Brigade, 2nd Division, XX Corps until October. He fought with the regiment at Liberty Gap and Chickamauga, being mentioned in dispatches by Gen. William Carlin for his actions during the latter engagement. Carlin named Vance an Aide-de-Camp, where he served until July 1864. He fought with Carlin at Lookout Mountain, Missionary Ridge, Resaca, and Kennesaw Mountain.

After the war, Vance was appointed by the Governor of Illinois to help organize the Illinois National Guard (ING). He was commissioned Captain of Company D of the 9th Infantry of the ING in 1876, then was reassigned to Company C of the 17th Infantry in 1878. In 1881, Vance was promoted to Inspector General and Major. On May 15, 1884, Vance was named Adjutant General of Illinois, the senior-most officer of the ING. He served this role for seven years, compiling eight volumes of war reports covering 1861 to 1868. He also established the Military Code of Illinois in January 1885. Vance founded Camp Lincoln in Springfield as a school of instruction and rifle range. He resigned on July 1, 1891 and moved to Springfield.

Aside from his military interests, Vance worked in the woolen goods trade for almost ten years after the Civil War. He then worked in insurance before maintaining mining and manufacturing interests. He died in Los Angeles, California on December 14, 1927, and was buried at Inglewood Park Cemetery.
