= L. Scott Rice =

United States Air Force general (born 1958)

Leon Scott Rice
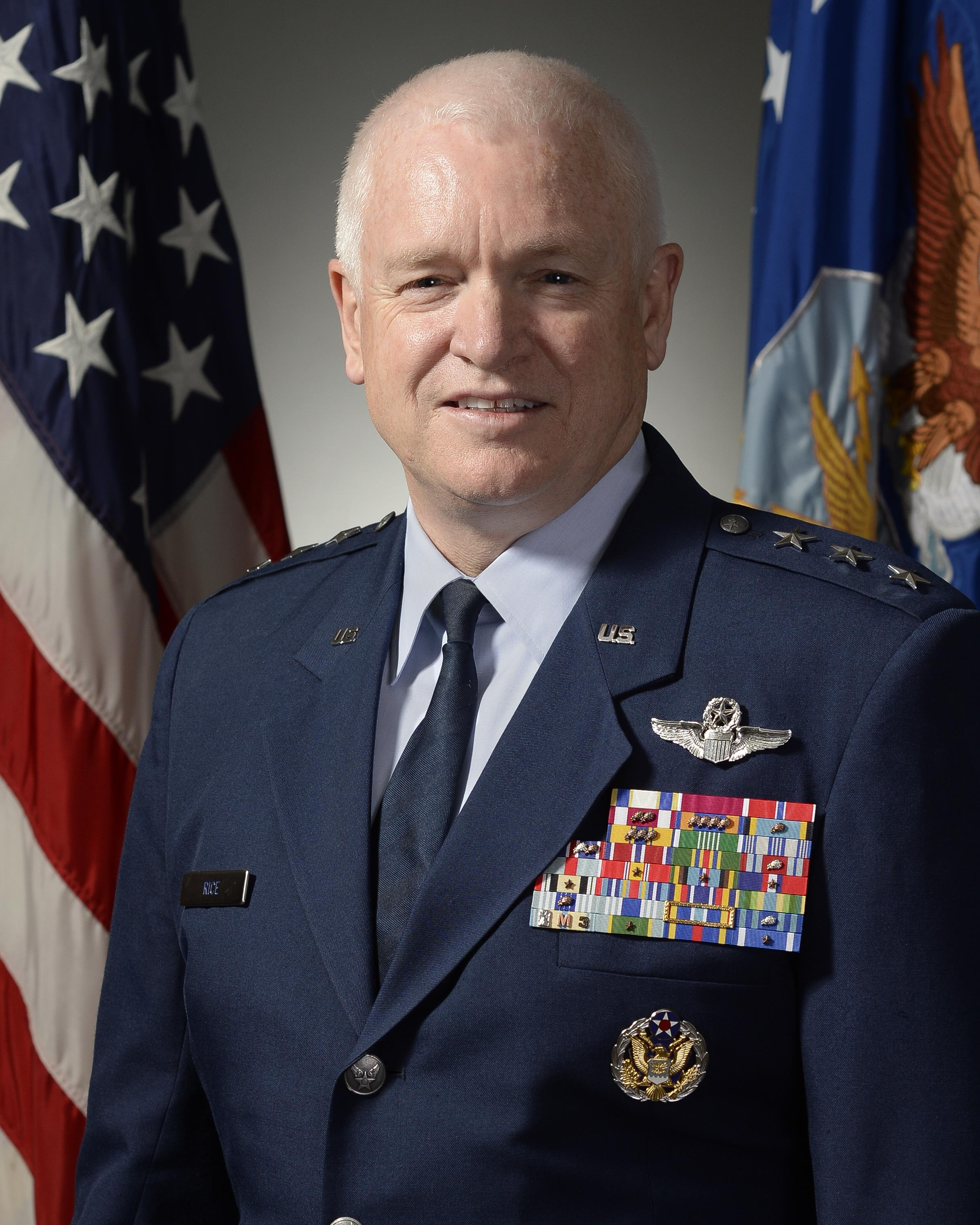
- Lieutenant General Leon Scott Rice
- Born: 27 May 1958 (age 68)
- Military career
- Allegiance: United States
- Branch: United States Air Force
- Service years: 1980–2020
- Rank: Lieutenant General
- Nickname: "Catfish"
- Commands: United States Air National Guard; Massachusetts National Guard; Massachusetts Air National Guard
- Conflicts: Kosovo War; Iraq War
- Awards: Air Force Distinguished Service Medal; Legion of Merit; Bronze Star Medal
- Other work: Pilot for United Airlines

Lieutenant General Leon Scott Rice (born 27 May 1958) is a former director of the Air National Guard. He previously served as The Adjutant General (TAG) and Commander of the Massachusetts National Guard and as an assistant to Gen Mark A. Welsh III, former commander of the United States Air Forces in Europe. Rice has also served as commander of USAF Forces deployed for United States Central Command in the Middle East Area of Operations. He is a Boeing 777 first officer flying for United Airlines (though currently on a military leave of absence) in Washington Dulles International Airport. On 3 April 2012 he was appointed by Governor Deval Patrick as The Adjutant General (TAG) of the Massachusetts National Guard and reappointed as The Adjutant General by Governor Charles Baker on 12 May 2015. Rice retired from the U.S. Air Force on 1 August 2020 after over 40 years of service.

== Early life ==
Rice was born 27 May 1958 to Leon Harold Rice (1919–2002) and Margery Ann (Miller) Rice (1918–2005) in Bedford, New Hampshire; a military family with his mother serving as a captain during WWII in the Army Nurse Corps, and eventually becoming in 1990 a Commander of the Department of New Hampshire Veterans of Foreign Wars. Rice is a direct descendant of Edmund Rice, an early immigrant to Massachusetts Bay Colony. (Note: The descendancy of Gen. Rice from Edmund Rice is as follows: Edmund Rice (1594–1663); Thomas Rice (1626–1681); Thomas Rice (1654–1747); Charles Rice (1684-?); Elijah Rice (1719–1785); Elijah Rice (1750–1805); Isaac Rice (1784–1876); Hiram Rice (1816–1894); John Henry Rice (1863–1951); Leon Hiram Rice (1890–1980); Leon Harold Rice (1919–2002); Maj. Gen. Leon Scott Rice (b. 1958).) Rice attended local public schools and earned the rank of Eagle Scout in 1972.

== Career ==
Rice was the director of the Air National Guard, The Pentagon, Washington, D.C. He is responsible for formulating, developing and coordinating all policies, plans and programs affecting more than 105,500 Guard members and civilians in more than 90 wings and 175 geographically separated units across 213 locations throughout the 50 States, the District of Columbia, Puerto Rico, Guam and the Virgin Islands.

Rice was commissioned in 1980 through the Reserve Officer Training Corps at Rensselaer Polytechnic Institute, Troy, New York and graduated from undergraduate pilot training at Reese Air Force Base, Texas in 1982. He is a command pilot with more than 4,300 hours in the F-111 and A-10. Before assuming his current position, General Rice served as The Adjutant General of the Massachusetts National Guard, responsible for commanding units of the Air and Army National Guard.

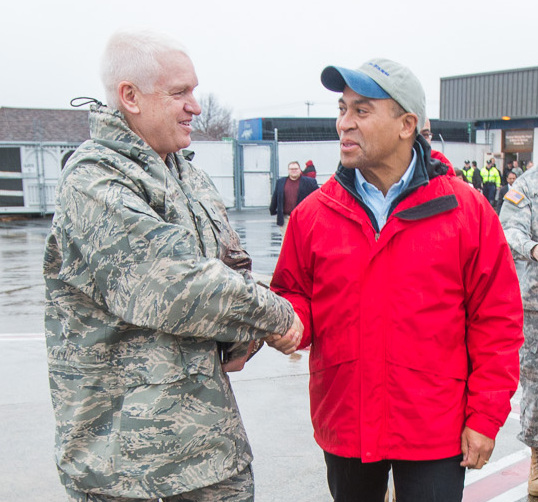
Rice (left) shaking hands with Massachusetts Governor Deval Patrick in 2014

He has served in various operational and staff assignments, including commander of US Air Force Forces deployed to Middle East locations under the United States Central Command; where, from 1995 to 2006, he was mobilized and deployed to Bosnia, Kosovo, Kuwait, Iraq, Jordan, Oman, and Pakistan. He has commanded a squadron, operations group, and fighter wing. He previously served as the assistant adjutant general for air, and commander of Massachusetts Air National Guard, chairman of the Air Guard Force Structure and Modernization committee of the Adjutants General Association of the United States (AGAUS), as the association's secretary, as a member of the Reserve Forces Policy Board for the Department of Defense, and has served on several General Officer Steering Committees for the National Guard.

Rice was nominated for promotion to lieutenant general and assignment as director of the Air National Guard by Barack Obama on 4 April 2016. This nomination was confirmed by the United States Senate on 28 April 2016. He assumed the position of Director of the Air National Guard on 10 May 2016. In August 2020, Colorado National Guard Adjutant General Michael A. Loh succeeded Rice as director. He is currently on the board of directors at the American Heritage Museum.

== Education ==
1980 Bachelor of Science in industrial engineering, Reserve Officers' Training Corps, Rensselaer Polytechnic Institute, Troy, New York
1981 Master of Science in Industrial Engineering, Rensselaer Polytechnic Institute, Troy, New York
2000 Air War College, by correspondence
2009 Harvard University, National and International Security Studies, Cambridge, Massachusetts
2009 George C. Marshall European Center for Security Studies, Garmisch-Partenkirchen, Germany
2010 George C. Marshall European Center for Security Studies, Garmisch-Partenkirchen, Germany
2010 Capstone Military Leadership Program, Fort Lesley J. McNair, Washington, District of Columbia
2011 Senior Reserve Component Officer Course, Army War College, Carlisle Barracks, Pennsylvania
2011 Combined Force Air Component Commanders Course, Maxwell Air Force Base, Montgomery, Alabama
2011 Harvard University, National Preparedness Leadership Initiative, [Cambridge, Massachusetts]
2012 Syracuse University, National Security Studies, [Syracuse, New York]
2015 Harvard University, National Preparedness Leadership Initiative, [Cambridge, Massachusetts]

== Assignments ==
1. May 1981 – May 1982, student, Undergraduate Pilot Training, Reese Air Force Base, Lubbock, Texas
2. May 1982 – July 1982, student, AT-38B Lead-In Training Course, Holloman Air Force Base, New Mexico
3. July 1982 – January 1983, student, F-111 United States Air Force Operation Training Course, Cannon Air Force Base, New Mexico
4. January 1983 – November 1984, aircraft commander, F-111, 493rd Tactical Fighter Wing, Royal Air Force Lakenheath, England
5. November 1984 – October 1985, instructor aircraft commander, F-111, 493rd Tactical Fighter Wing, Royal Air Force Lakenheath, England
6. October 1985 – December 1985, student, Squadron Officer School, Maxwell Air Force Base, Alabama
7. December 1985 – May 1986, student, F-111 Fighter Weapons Instructor Course, Mountain Home Air Force Base, Idaho
8. May 1986 – April 1987, chief of weapons and tactics/instructor pilot, F-111, 493rd Tactical Fighter Wing, Royal Air Force Lakenheath, England
9. April 1987 – April 1988, instructor pilot, F-111, 391st Tactical Fighter Squadron, Mountain Home Air Force Base, Idaho
10. April 1988 – November 1989, chief of Wing Weapons Section, 366th Tactical Fighter Wing, Mountain Home Air Force Base, Idaho
11. November 1989 – January 1992, pilot, A-10, 131st Tactical Fighter Squadron, Barnes Air National Guard Base, Westfield, Massachusetts
12. February 1992 – December 1994, pilot, A-10, 131st Fighter Squadron, Barnes Air National Guard Base, Westfield, Massachusetts
13. December 1994 – December 1995, assistant flight commander of 131st Fighter Squadron, Barnes Air National Guard Base, Westfield, Massachusetts
14. December 1995 – June 1997, instructor pilot, A-10, 131st Fighter Squadron, Barnes Air National Guard Base, Westfield, Massachusetts
15. June 1997 – June 1998, commander of Operations Support Flight, 131st Fighter Squadron, Barnes Air National Guard Base, Westfield, Massachusetts
16. June 1998 – September 1999, commander of Operations Support Flight, 104th Operations Support Flight, Barnes Air National Guard Base, Westfield, Massachusetts
17. June 2002 – April 2004, commander of 104th Operations Group, Barnes Air National Guard Base, Westfield, Massachusetts
18. May 2004 – July 2007, director of operations, J2, Massachusetts Joint Force Headquarters, Massachusetts National Guard, Milford, Massachusetts
19. July 2007 – September 2010, assistant adjutant general-air, Massachusetts National Guard, Milford, Massachusetts
20. September 2010 – present, chief of staff, Massachusetts Air National Guard, Milford, Massachusetts; dual hatted, February 2010 – February 2011, (A-6), assistant to the director, Air National Guard; dual-hatted, March 2011 – present, assistant to the commander of United States Air Forces Europe
21. April 2012 – May 2016, The Adjutant General, Massachusetts National Guard, Hanscom Air Force Base, Massachusetts
22. May 2016 – August 2020, director of the Air National Guard, the Pentagon, Washington, D.C.

== Awards and decorations ==
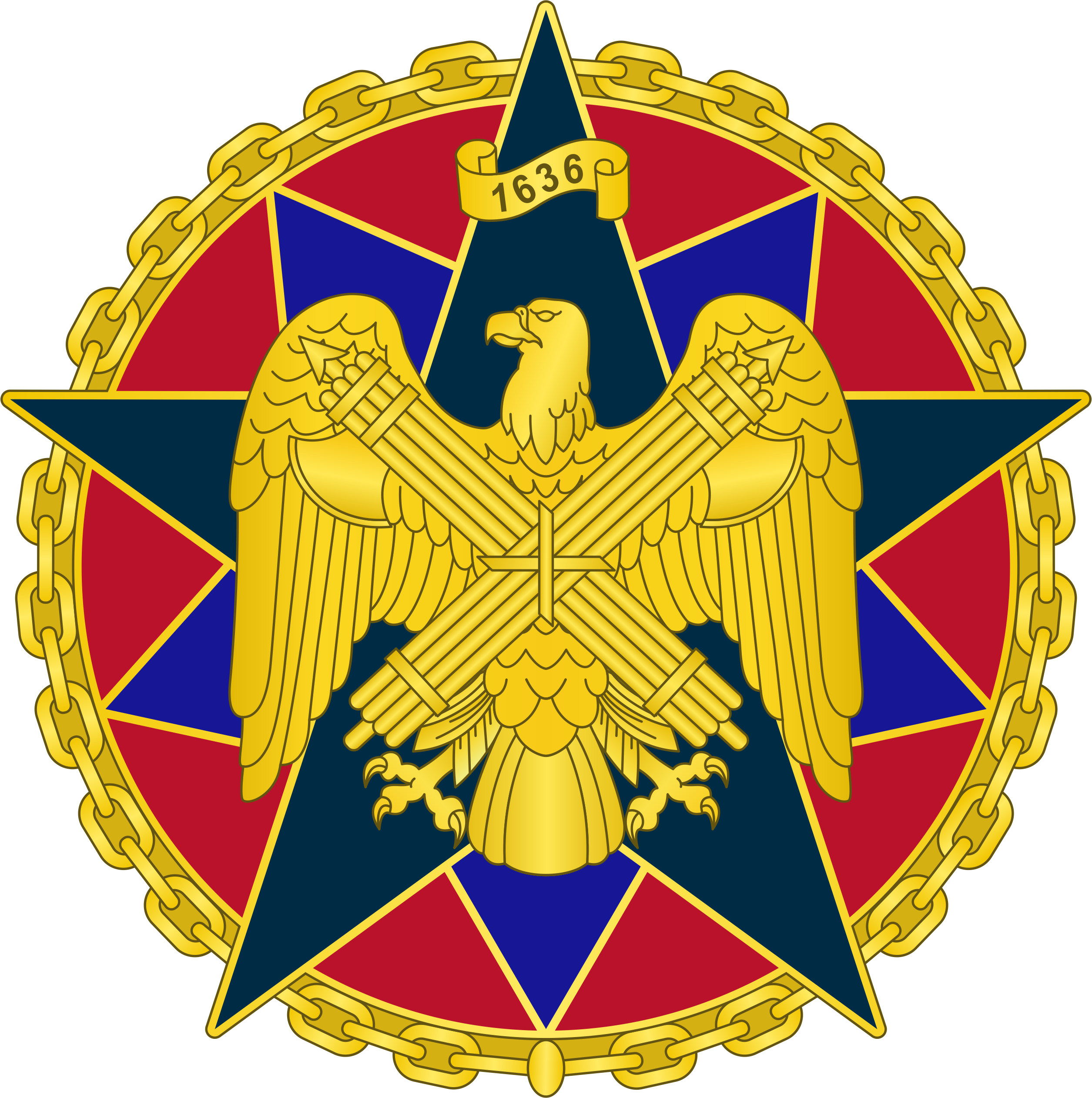
| US Air Force Command Pilot Badge |
| Headquarters Air Force Badge |
| National Guard Bureau Organizational Badge |

| Air Force Distinguished Service Medal |
| Legion of Merit |
| Bronze Star Medal |
| Meritorious Service Medal with two bronze oak leaf clusters |
| Air Medal with four bronze oak leaf clusters |
| Aerial Achievement Medal with bronze oak leaf cluster |
| Air Force Commendation Medal with three oak leaf clusters |
| Army Commendation Medal |
| Air Force Achievement Medal |
| Navy Meritorious Unit Commendation |
| Air Force Outstanding Unit Award with Valor device and silver and bronze oak leaf clusters |
| Air Force Organizational Excellence Award |
| Combat Readiness Medal with silver oak leaf cluster |
| Air Force Recognition Ribbon |
| National Defense Service Medal with bronze service star |
| Armed Forces Expeditionary Medal with bronze service star |
| Kosovo Campaign Medal with bronze service star |
| Iraq Campaign Medal with bronze service star |
| Global War on Terrorism Expeditionary Medal |
| Global War on Terrorism Service Medal |
| Armed Forces Service Medal |
| Air Force Overseas Short Tour Service Ribbon with bronze oak leaf cluster |
| Air Force Overseas Long Tour Service Ribbon |
| Air Force Expeditionary Service Ribbon with gold frame |
| Air Force Longevity Service Award with silver and bronze oak leaf clusters |
| Armed Forces Reserve Medal with silver Hourglass device, "M" device and bronze award numeral 3 |
| Small Arms Expert Marksmanship Ribbon with bronze service star |
| Air Force Training Ribbon |
| NATO Medal for the Former Yugoslavia with bronze service star |
| Massachusetts Air National Guard Service Medal with bronze service star |
| Massachusetts Desert Storm Service Ribbon |
| Massachusetts Defense Expeditionary Ribbon |
| Massachusetts Emergency Service Ribbon |
| Louisiana Emergency Service Medal |

=== Other achievements ===
1972 Eagle Scout
2005 George W. Bush Award for Leadership in the Guard/Reserve

== Effective dates of promotion ==
Promotions
| Insignia | Rank | Date |
|---|---|---|
| | Lieutenant general | May 4, 2016 |
| | Major general | December 23, 2010 |
| | Brigadier general | July 24, 2007 |
| | Colonel | June 15, 2003 |
| | Lieutenant colonel | September 9, 1998 |
| | Major | November 18, 1992 |
| | Captain | November 18, 1984 |
| | First lieutenant | November 18, 1982 |
| | Second lieutenant | May 17, 1980 |
