= LeAnne Withrow =

American transgender activist, veteran, and author

LeAnne Keely Erin Withrow
- Born: 1990 (age 35–36)
- Military career
- Allegiance: United States
- Service: Illinois Army National Guard
- Service years: 2010–2023
- Rank: Staff Sergeant
- Unit: 139th Mobile Public Affairs Detachment
- Conflicts: Operation Enduring Freedom (Guantanamo Bay)

LeAnne Keely Erin Withrow (born 1990) is an American transgender activist, veteran, and author. She is a public advocate on behalf of transgender military personnel and federal workers, particularly in challenging discriminatory policies surrounding gender identity and workplace rights. Withrow served in the Illinois Army National Guard for over 13 years before her medical retirement and has published works under the names Ian Withrow and LeAnne Keely.

== Early life and education ==
Withrow was born in Galesburg, Illinois, and grew up in central Illinois. She attended the University of Illinois Springfield, where she is earning a bachelor's degree in communications and currently writes for the UIS Observer.

== Advocacy ==
Withrow publicly came out as transgender in 2016, becoming the first openly transgender service member in the Illinois National Guard. She later served as communications director for SPARTA, a nonprofit advocacy organization that promotes inclusive military service policies and supports LGBTQ+ service members. She has been a frequent media contributor and speaker on issues of gender equity, inclusion in the armed forces, and the experiences of transgender veterans. In interviews with NPR Illinois and other outlets, Withrow has discussed the intersection of military culture, personal identity, and evolving federal workplace protections. In 2025, Withrow filed a class action Equal Employment Opportunity (EEO) complaint, represented by the ACLU, challenging a federal mandate requiring government employees to use bathrooms based on sex assigned at birth. The case, which argues the policy violates civil rights and equal protection, drew national attention and was cited by multiple legal and media organizations. Later that year, Withrow and other plaintiffs, represented jointly by the ACLU and Democracy Forward, filed the federal class-action lawsuit Withrow v. United States Of America in the United States District Court for the District of Columbia. The suit seeks to enjoin the enforcement of the policy nationwide and to certify a class of affected transgender and intersex federal employees. Withrow has spoken on NPR Illinois and at community events about the personal and systemic challenges faced by transgender people in service. She continues to use her platform to advocate for dignity, access, and protection for transgender federal workers and veterans.

== Military career ==
Withrow enlisted in the Illinois Army National Guard in 2010 as a food service specialist (92G) and reclassified as a public affairs specialist in 2013. She served with the 139th Mobile Public Affairs Detachment and was involved in domestic and international operations including:

- Deployment to Guantanamo Bay Naval Base (2015–2016)
- Ulchi Freedom Guardian (2013) in South Korea
- NATO Summit (2012) in Chicago
- Eager Lion (2019) in Jordan
- Arctic Eagle (2020) in Alaska
- Response efforts for flooding, Hurricane Irma, COVID-19, and civil disturbances

She medically retired in December 2023 with over a dozen awards and commendations for service. Following retirement, she continued working in the National Guard as a civilian Lead Military Family Readiness Specialist and Disability Program Manager.

== Writing career ==
Withrow is also an author of speculative and contemporary fiction. Writing under the names Ian Withrow and LeAnne Keely, her work frequently explores themes of identity, power, and transformation. Her titles are published through Ink & Quill Press, an independent publisher based in Illinois. Notable works:

- Tragedy of Power (as Ian Withrow)
- Apathetic God (as Ian Withrow)
- Sinister (as LeAnne Keely)
- Rain in October (as LeAnne Keely)
- Snow in November (as LeAnne Keely)

== Awards and decorations ==
Withrow’s decorations include:

- Meritorious Service Medal
- Army Commendation Medal
- Joint Meritorious Unit Award
- Army Achievement Medal (with two oak leaf clusters)
- Army Reserve Components Achievement Medal (with three oak leaf clusters)
- National Defense Service Medal
- Global War on Terrorism Expeditionary Medal
- Global War on Terrorism Service Medal
- Armed Forces Reserve Medal (with "M" device and bronze hourglass)
- NCO Professional Development Ribbon (numeral 2)
- Army Service Ribbon
- Overseas Service Ribbon (numeral 3)
- Army Reserve Components Overseas Training Ribbon (numeral 5)
- Illinois Military Long and Honorable Service Medal (numeral 3)
- Illinois State Active Duty Ribbon
- Illinois Abraham Lincoln Medal of Freedom

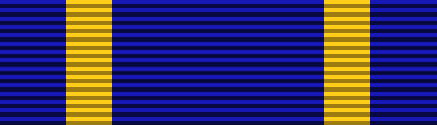

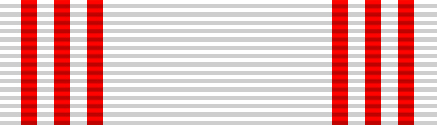

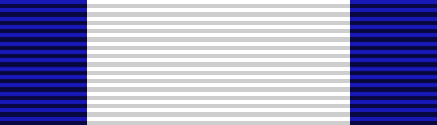

== Public recognition ==
Withrow has been profiled in Time, Reuters, The Associated Press and NPR Illinois for her advocacy work and service record. In 2023, she was recognized by the Illinois National Guard for outstanding contributions to public affairs and diversity outreach initiatives.

== See also ==
- Transgender people and military service in the United States
- SPARTA (military organization)
- American Civil Liberties Union
