= Illinois Naval Militia =

- Active: 1898–1988; 2006 (reauthorized)
- Country: United States
- Allegiance: Illinois
- Type: Naval militia
- Size: c.600 (1917)

The Illinois Naval Militia was a naval militia created by the Illinois General Assembly in 1893, and finally dissolved in 1988. The naval militia was reauthorized by Governor Rod Blagojevich through an executive order in 2006. As a naval militia it was a state defense force and not part of the Illinois National Guard or National Guard of the United States.

== Formation ==
In September 1892 a meeting was called by Lieutenant-Commander B. M. Shaffner, attended by more than 20 graduates of the Naval Academy at Annapolis who were resident in Chicago, which proposed the formation of a State Naval Militia. The following year a bill was finally passed, and approved by Governor Altgeld, which provided for the creation and establishment of the Illinois Naval Militia, to consist of two battalions, each having a maximum strength of 400 men, and a minimum of 140. The 1st Battalion was based in Chicago, and the 2nd Battalion in Moline on the Mississippi. The 1st Battalion initially had 225 men, divided into four divisions, while the 2nd Battalion, had 176 men at its foundation, soon rising to 206.

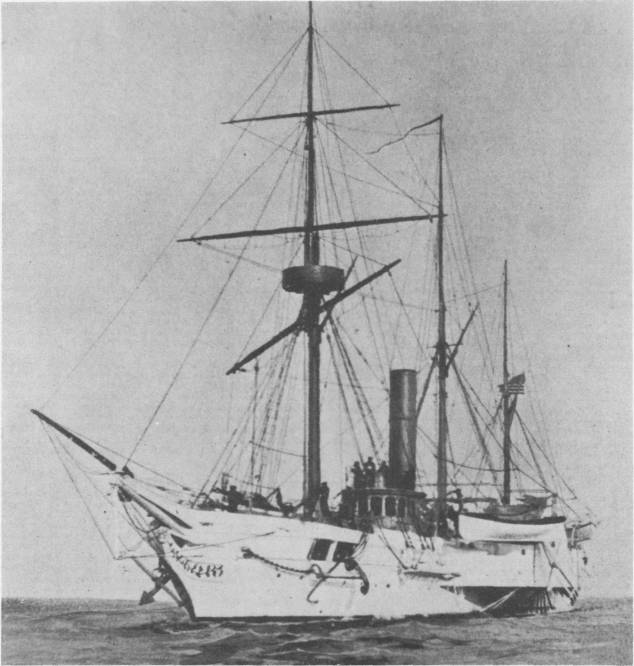
USS Michigan, seen here after her name was changed to USS Wolverine in 1905

The 1st Battalion met one evening each week and practiced boat-drill, both sail and oar, and were trained in the use of torpedoes, for which a steam-launch was specially fitted; and in the use of artillery, the cutlass, and small arms. The Navy Department presented the First Battalion with a complete stand of Hotchkiss rifles, cutlasses and revolvers, a Hotchkiss Rotary Gun and a battery of four 3-inch breech-loading field guns. Each summer there was a three-week cruise, for which the Militia was loaned a ship, usually obsolete, by the Navy. Up until 1901 this was usually the USS Michigan.

The officers of the militia were all former naval men, and several were veterans of the Civil War. There was also an associate membership, composed of many of the leading merchants, bankers and professional men of Chicago, including Marshall Field, Lyman J. Gage, and Charles Deering. Further, honorary memberships were awarded to Shelby M. Cullom, J. Frank Aldrich, and Colonel Leroy P. Stewart, Inspector General of the First Brigade of the Illinois National Guard.

Following the 1893 World's Columbian Exposition, there were plans to move the replica battleship Illinois to a pier near Van Buren Street, where the ship would have become the headquarters of the militia.

By 1896, the Illinois Naval Militia had five divisions: three in Chicago, one in Moline, and one in Alton, of approximately 250, 100, and 50 men respectively. At that time, it received $25,000 in federal funds annually, and operated several boats and a steam launch.

== World War I ==
In late 1916 the Illinois Naval Militia was federalized into the National Naval Volunteers, created by an act of Congress and approved on August 29, 1916, under which the President was permitted to call them up for active duty with the United States Navy. Detailed plans for mobilization were prepared, and within forty-eight hours of the declaration of war on April 6, 1917, the entire Illinois Naval Militia had left Chicago by train for the Philadelphia Navy Yard. Some were actually at sea within a week of the declaration of war, and many more on the first group of ships that left the United States bound for Europe.

At that time the Illinois Naval Militia consisted of 579 men organised into:

- Headquarters and staff, Chicago, 38 men under the command of Captain Edward A. Evers, including medical staff, paymaster and commissary
- 1st Division, Chicago, 40 men, Lieutenant John A. Mulholland
- 2nd Division, Chicago, 45 men, Lieutenant James D. Davidson
- 3rd Division, Chicago, 59 men, Lieutenant Glen G. Meade
- 4th Division, Chicago, 58 men, Lieutenant George H. Melvin
- 5th Division, Chicago, 54 men, Lieutenant Fred B. Orr
- 6th Division, Chicago, 38 men, Lieutenant Walter E. Davis
- 7th Division, Moline, 21 men, Lieutenant Otis W. Howard
- 8th Division, Peoria, 44 men, Lieutenant Benjamin R. Belsley
- 9th Division, Alton, 28 men, Lieutenant Josiah B. Maxfield
- 10th Division, Quincy, 55 men, Lieutenant William A. Johnson
- Marine Company, Chicago, 41 men, Captain Franklin T. Steele

== Later history ==
World War I marked the high-point of the Illinois Naval Militia. The United States Naval Reserve was formed in 1915, and those states that maintained Naval Militias received very little federal aid, and then only if the members of their state Naval Militia were also members of the Naval Reserve, which offered more benefits. There was also competition for personnel from the Marine Corps Reserve and Coast Guard Auxiliary. Inevitably, the Naval Militia's popularity began to decline.

By the 1970s, the Illinois Naval Militia had become little more than a social club located on the Chicago waterfront. When the city annexed the property, the militia effectively ceased to exist, but was not formally dissolved until 1988. However, on January 19, 2006, it was reauthorized, though never re-established, by an executive order of Governor Rod Blagojevich. Senate Republicans disputed the governor's authority to resurrect the militia.

== Ships ==
- Michigan (1893–1901)
- Dorothea (1901–1909)
- Nashville (1909–1911)
- Dubuque (1911–1914)
- Isla de Luzon (1914–1917)
- Somers (1914–1918)
- Patrol (1915-unknown)

== See also ==
- Illinois Air National Guard
- Illinois Army National Guard
- Illinois Reserve Militia
- Illinois Wing Civil Air Patrol
- United States Coast Guard Auxiliary
- United States Naval Sea Cadet Corps
- United States Power Squadrons
