= Richard R. Neely =

40th Adjutant general of Illinois

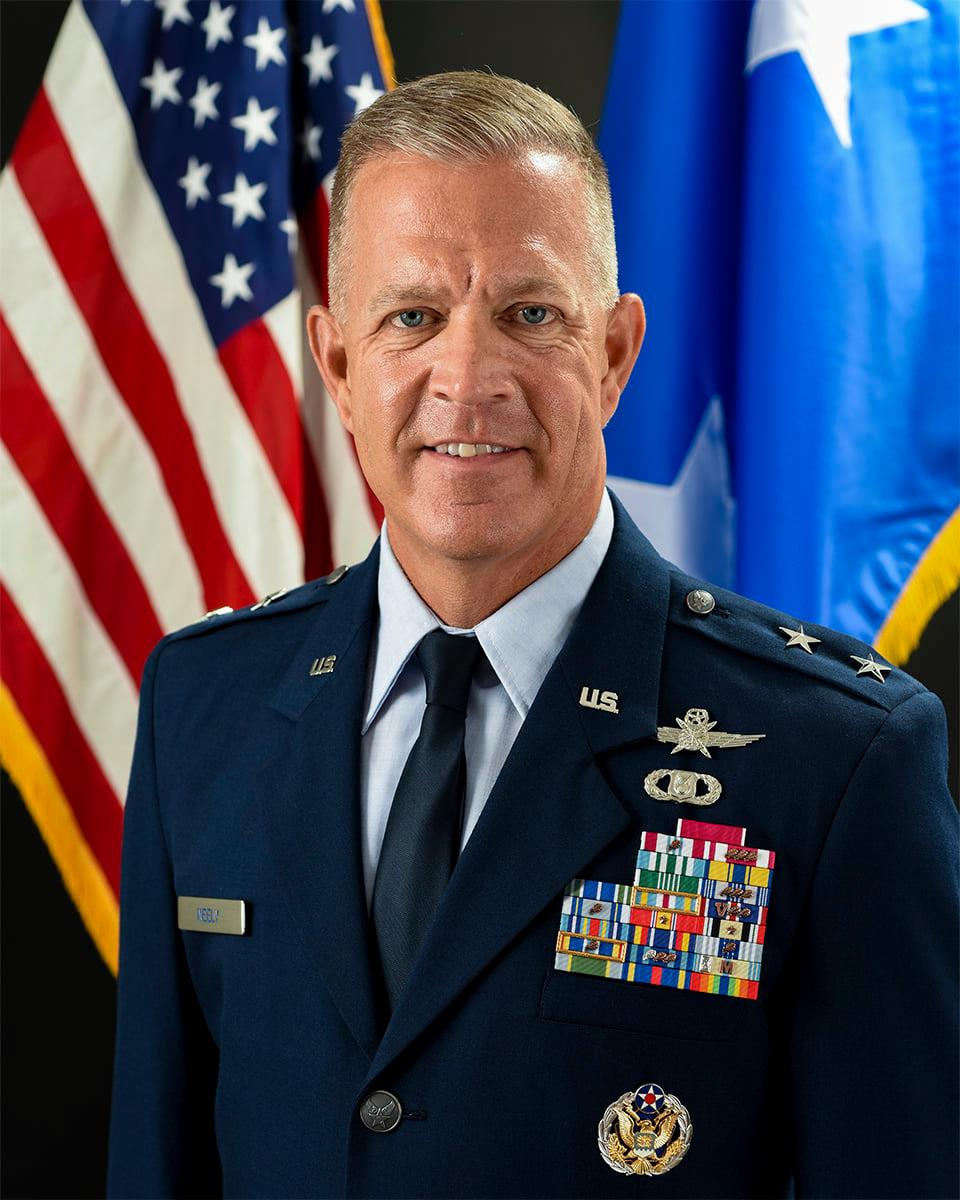
- 2020 official portrait of Major General Neely
- Military career
- Allegiance: United States
- Branch: US Air National Guard; US Air Force
- Service years: 1984 – present
- Rank: Major general
- Commands: Illinois Army National Guard; 183rd Fighter Wing
- Awards: Legion of Merit; Defense Meritorious Service Medal (2); Meritorious Service Medal (4); Order of Merit of the Republic of Poland

Richard R. Neely is a United States Air Force officer and the 40th Adjutant general of Illinois.

== Career ==
Neely was appointed the 40th Illinois Adjutant General by Governor J. B. Pritzker and assumed those duties on 15 February 2019.

Neely's prior assignment was Air National Guard principal deputy director for operations and deputy director for cyber and space operations at Joint Base Andrews in Maryland.

Neely began his career as an enlisted soldier in the Army Reserves and later joined the Air National Guard as an airman. He received his officer's commission in 1990.

On 18 November 2020, Neely was nominated for federal recognition and United States Senate confirmation of his promotion to major general by Governor Pritzker on 1 October 2020. His promotion was confirmed by voice vote of the Senate on 14 December 2020.

He retired in May 2024.

== Dates of rank ==
Insignia	Rank	Component	Dates
	Second Lieutenant	ANG	2 August 1990
	First Lieutenant	ANG	1 July 1993
	Captain	ANG	5 July 1995
	Major	ANG	8 June 2000
	Lieutenant Colonel	ANG	5 November 2005
	Colonel	ANG	7 December 2009
	Brigadier General	ANG	8 February 2019
	Major General (IL)	IL	1 October 2020
	Major General	ANG	14 December 2020
