= Thomas W. Scott =

American epidemiologist

- Born: 1950 (age 75–76)
- Children: 2

Academic background
- Education: BS, business, 1973, MS, biology, 1977, Bowling Green State University; PhD, ecology, 1981, Pennsylvania State University; NIH Post-Doctoral Fellow, epidemiology, 1983 Yale School of Medicine

Academic work
- Institutions: University of California, Davis; University of Maryland, College Park

Thomas Wallace Scott is an American tropical infectious disease epidemiologist.

== Early life and education ==
Scott was born in Westfield, NJ in 1950. He attended Bowling Green State University (BGSU) with a basketball scholarship and completed his Bachelor of Business Administration degree in 1973 before changing to biology for his Master's degree in 1977. He left BGSU for his PhD in ecology from the Pennsylvania State University in 1981 and completed a National Institutes of Health post-doctoral fellowship in epidemiology at the Yale School of Medicine in 1983.

== Career ==
Upon completing his formal education, Scott became a faculty member at the University of Maryland, College Park before relocating in 1996 to the University of California, Davis. In 1990 he was a National Research Council Senior Research Associate in Bangkok, Thailand. While at UC Davis, Scott co-founded the Center for Vector-Borne Research, which was composed of researchers throughout the UC System, and directed the UC Davis Arbovirus Research Unit. He also served as vice chair of the UC Davis Entomology Department. Throughout his tenure at UC Davis, Scott's research focused on epidemiology of mosquito-borne disease, mosquito ecology, evolution of mosquito-virus interactions, and evaluation of novel products and strategies for disease prevention.

As a result of his research, Scott was bestowed the honorary title of distinguished professor; elected a Fellow of the American Society for Tropical Medicine and Hygiene; elected Fellow of the American Association for the Advancement of Science; elected a Fellow of the Entomological Society of America; named the recipient of the C. W. Woodworth Award, the highest award given by the Pacific Branch of the Entomological Society of America; and awarded the Harry Hoogstraal Medal from the American Society of Tropical Medicine and Hygiene.

After retiring in 2015, Scott continued his dengue research in Peru and served as Chair of the WHO Vector Control Advisory Group and Co-Chair of the WHO Steering Committee for the Global Vector Control Response until 2019. Since 2019, Scott has been listed as a Highly Cited Researcher by the Web of Science Group. He has published over 300 papers and recorded more than 60,000 citations.

=== Awards and honors ===
Scott is a Fellow of the American Association for the Advancement of Science, American Society of Tropical Medicine and Hygiene, and Entomological Society of America; was a National Research Council Associate; is a Past-President of the Society for Vector Ecology; and is a past-Chair of the Mosquito Modeling Group in the program on Research and Policy in Infectious Disease Dynamics. At the World Health Organization he was Chair of the Vector Control Advisory Group; Co-Chair of the Steering Committee for the Global Vector Control Response; Chair of the Technical Working Group for Dengue; Co-Chair of the Steering Committee for the Global Vector Control Response; Chair of the Emergency Response Consultation on New Vector Control Tools for control of Zika virus disease; served on the Expert Meeting to Review Vector Control Options for Control of Zika Virus; served on the International Health Regulators Roster of Experts; and currently serves on the WHO Technical Advisory Group for the Global Arbovirus Initiative and the Executive Committee for the Lancet Commission on Aedes-transmitted Diseases.
