= Illinois Reserve Militia =

US military unit

- Active: 25 June 1917 - 1919; 1941 - 1946
- Country: United States
- Allegiance: Illinois
- Branch: Army
- Type: State defense force
- Role: Military reserve force

Commanders
- Current commander: Governor of Illinois

The Illinois Reserve Militia was the state defense force of Illinois during World War I and World War II. After the Illinois National Guard was federalized, the Illinois Reserve Militia was organized to assume the stateside duties of the National Guard.

== History ==
=== World War I ===
Before the Illinois National Guard was called into federal service, the State Council of Defense established the Illinois Volunteer Training Corps in order to begin training citizen volunteers in paramilitary skills. On 25 June 1917, legislation creating the Illinois Reserve Militia was signed. By 9 November 1918 there were 8 regiments of Reserve Militia, plus 1 separate battalion, and 38 separate companies, organized in two brigades, with approximately 475 officers and 7,000 enlisted men.

In August 1919, approximately 1,500 soldiers from the 7th and 10th regiments of the Illinois Reserve Militia were stationed at their headquarters in Peoria, Illinois, to be prepared to respond to potential rioting from striking workers at the Keystone Steel and Wire Company.

=== World War II ===
The Illinois Reserve Militia was reactivated in 1941, and by December 1941, the Reserve Militia was on continuous duty. Illinois organized the Reserve Militia as a full infantry division and an air corps, totaling nearly 6,000 soldiers by June 1944, with its members agreeing to serve a two-year initial enlistment.

In September 1942, the Illinois Reserve Militia was mobilized and placed on standby during a strike by employees of the Western Cartridge Company. In December 1945, approximately 450 members of the Illinois Reserve Militia were mobilized to operate a shuttle service between all the major Chicago bus, train, and air terminals after various mass transit systems became overwhelmed due to the number of servicemen attempting to return to their homes.

== Legal status ==
The authority of each state to maintain its own state defense force is recognized by the federal government of the United States under Title 32, Section 109 of the United States Code. Approximately twenty-three states and the territory of Puerto Rico currently maintain state defense forces. Under Illinois law, the Governor of Illinois has the legal authority to reactivate the Illinois Reserve Militia.

== See also ==
- Illinois Naval Militia
- Illinois Wing Civil Air Patrol
