= Michael A. Loh =

United States Air Force Lieutenant general

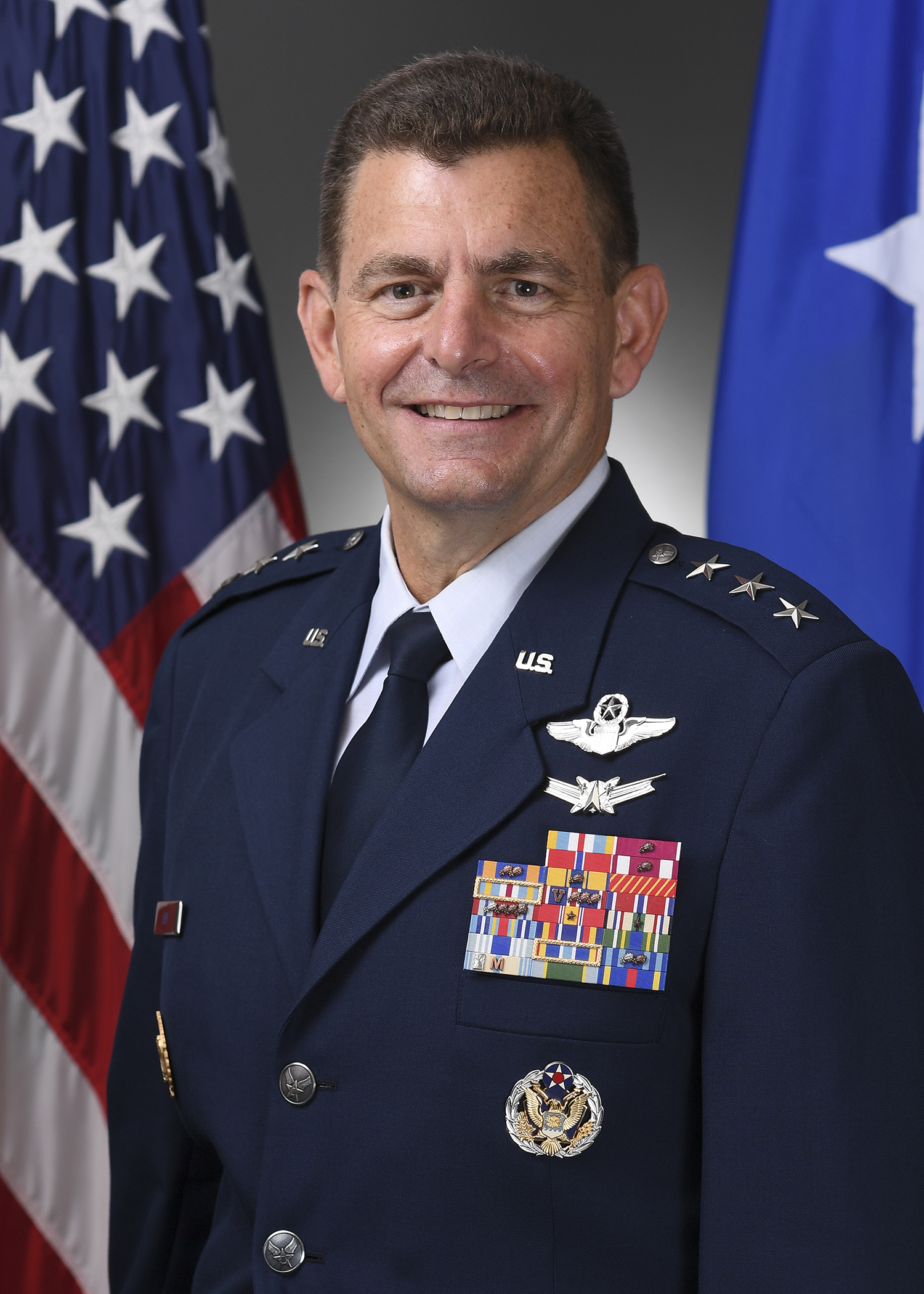
- Born: 1962 (age 63–64)
- Relatives: General John M. Loh (father); Jules Loh (uncle)
- Military career
- Allegiance: United States
- Branch: United States Air Force; Air National Guard
- Service years: 1984–2024
- Rank: Lieutenant General
- Commands: Air National Guard; Colorado National Guard; 140th Operations Group; 140th Operations Support Squadron
- Conflicts: Operation Provide Comfort II; Iraq War
- Awards: Defense Superior Service Medal; Legion of Merit (2); Bronze Star Medal

Michael Anthony Loh (born 1962) is a retired United States Air Force lieutenant general who last served as the 13th director of the Air National Guard from July 2020 to June 2024. He previously served as the adjutant general of the Colorado National Guard from April 2017 to July 2020, and as the National Guard assistant to the commander of Air Combat Command from April 2016 to April 2017. Loh is the son of a former commander of Air Combat Command, General John M. Loh. Loh received his commission through the United States Air Force Academy in 1984.

== Awards and decorations ==
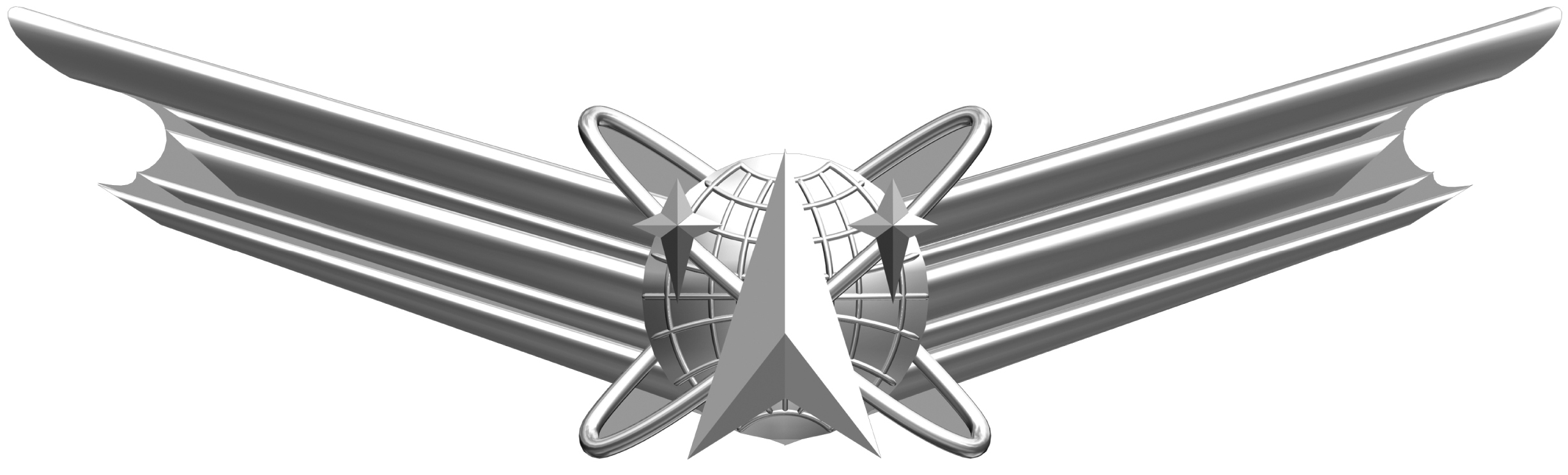
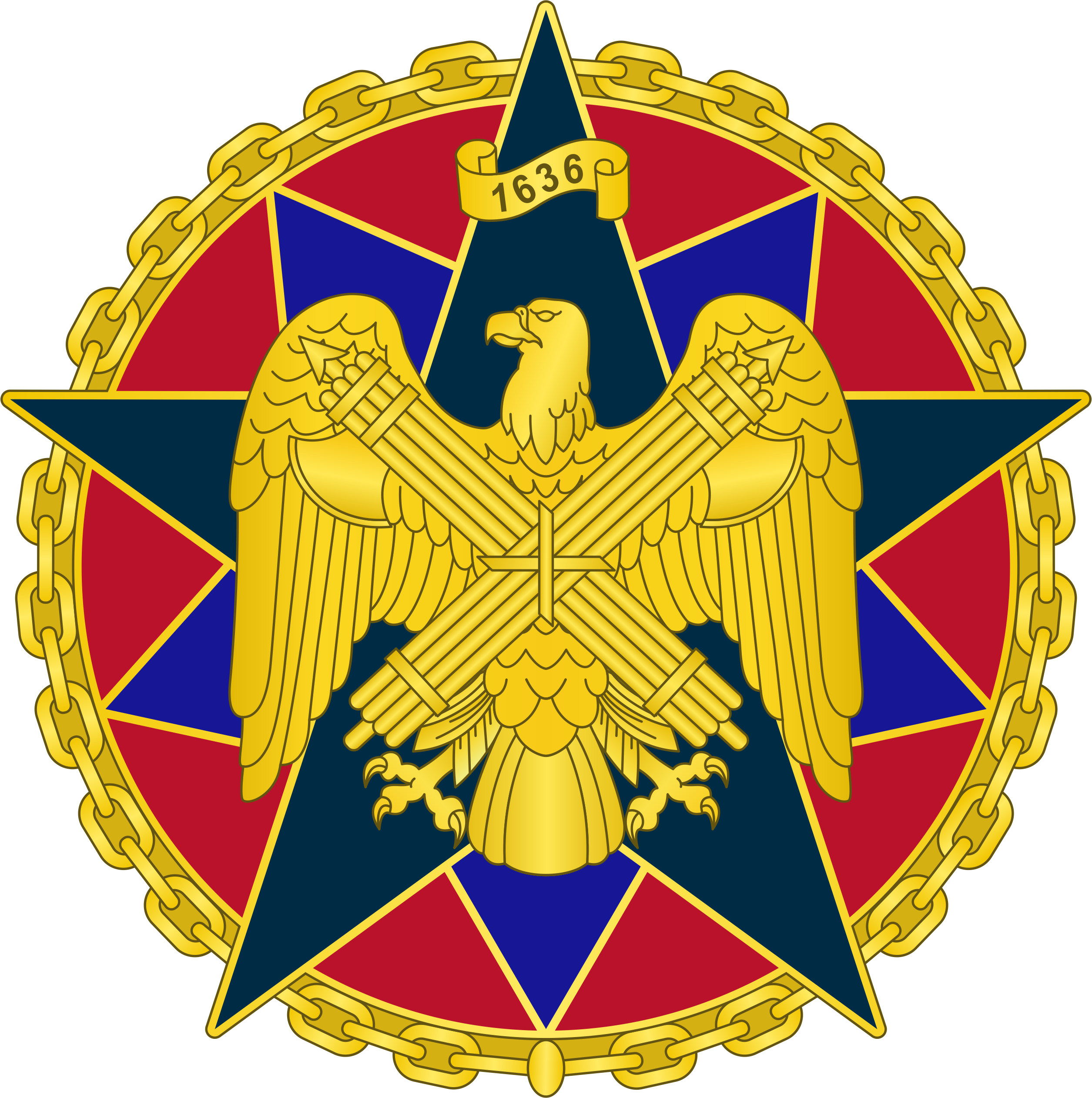
US Air Force Command Pilot Badge
Basic Space Operations Badge
Basic Parachutist Badge
Headquarters Air Force Badge
National Guard Bureau Organizational Badge

Defense Superior Service Medal
Legion of Merit with one bronze oak leaf cluster
Bronze Star Medal
Meritorious Service Medal with oak leaf cluster
Air Medal with two oak leaf clusters
Air Force Commendation Medal with oak leaf cluster
Air Force Combat Action Medal
Joint Meritorious Unit Award with oak leaf cluster
Air Force Outstanding Unit Award with Valor device and three bronze oak leaf clusters
Air Force Organizational Excellence Award
Combat Readiness Medal with eight oak leaf clusters
National Defense Service Medal with one bronze service star
Southwest Asia Service Medal with one service star
Global War on Terrorism Expeditionary Medal
Global War on Terrorism Service Medal
Korea Defense Service Medal
Air Force Overseas Long Tour Service Ribbon
Air Force Expeditionary Service Ribbon with gold frame
Air Force Longevity Service Award with one silver and one bronze oak leaf clusters
Armed Forces Reserve Medal with silver Hourglass device and "M" device
Small Arms Expert Marksmanship Ribbon
Air Force Training Ribbon

== Effective dates of promotions ==
Rank	Date
Second Lieutenant	May 28, 1984
First Lieutenant	May 28, 1986
Captain	May 28, 1988
Major	October 1, 1997
Lieutenant Colonel	November 3, 2001
Colonel	October 14, 2006
Brigadier General	May 21, 2010
Major General	August 1, 2013
Lieutenant General	July 22, 2020

Military offices
Preceded by H. Michael Edwards	Adjutant General of the Colorado National Guard; 2017–2020	Succeeded by Laura Clellan
Preceded by L. Scott Rice	Director of the Air National Guard; 2020–2024	Succeeded by Duke Pirak; Acting
