= Alicia Tate-Nadeau =

American Army National Guard officer

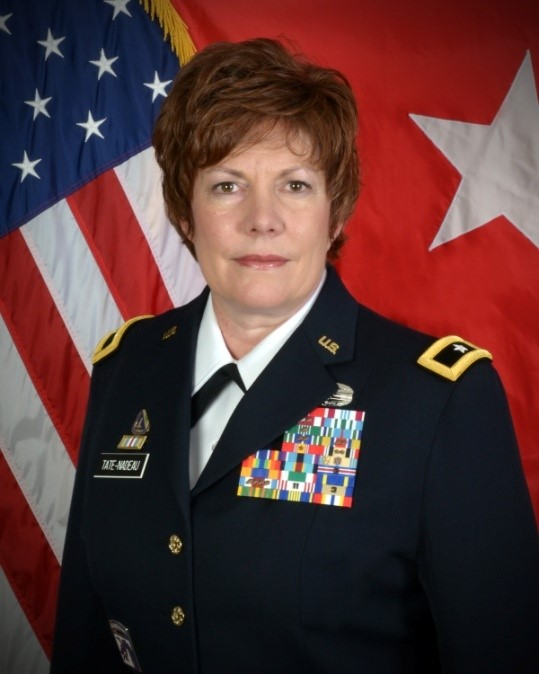
- Military career
- Allegiance: United States
- Branch: United States Army
- Service years: 1986–2017
- Rank: Brigadier General
- Commands: Illinois Army National Guard; 44th Chemical Battalion; 5th WMD Civil Support Team
- Conflicts: Iraq War
- Awards: Bronze Star Medal; Defense Meritorious Service Medal; Meritorious Service Medal (7)

Brigadier General Alicia A. Tate-Nadeau is a senior officer in the United States Army National Guard and the first woman to be promoted to brigadier general in the Illinois Army National Guard. She currently serves as the director of the Illinois Emergency Management Agency.

== Education ==
Tate-Nadeau studied business at Southwestern Oklahoma State University, and was a member of the Alpha Gamma Delta sorority. In 1984, after the Dean of Woman at her school suggested it would help raise her GPA, she joined the Reserve Officer's Training Corps (ROTC). She would later transfer to the University of Central Oklahoma, graduating with a degree in health. In 1986, through the university's ROTC program, she was commissioned as a second lieutenant in the United States Army. Tate-Nadeau later earned master's degrees in Health Administration and Strategic Studies from Governors State University and the United States Army War College, respectively. Credentialed in 2003 as a Certified Emergency Manager by the International Association of Emergency Managers, Tate-Nadeau also received Executive Certification in Counter-Terrorism - International Institute for Counter-Terrorism from the Lauder School of Government, Herzliya, Israel in 2013 and is a 2018 graduate of the Naval Postgraduate School Executive Leaders Program.

== Career ==
Alicia Tate-Nadeau was appointed by Governor J. B. Pritzker to serve as the Illinois Homeland Security Advisor and the director of the Illinois Emergency Management Agency (IEMA) in January 2019. In her capacity as Illinois Homeland Security Advisory, Tate-Nadeau serves on the executive committee for the Governor's Homeland Security Advisor Council. She also leads the Illinois Governor’s Public Safety Executive Committee and Illinois Cyber Security Executive Committee. Tate-Nadeau also serves on the Cybersecurity and Infrastructure Security Agency's (CISA) Cybersecurity Advisory Committee, as regional vice president of the Homeland Security Committee for the National Emergency Management Association (NEMA), the Cybersecurity Committee for the Council of Governors and is nominated for the Department of Homeland Security (DHS) Homeland Security Advisory Council (HSAC).

Tate-Nadeau brings more than three decades of experience in national security, emergency management, and public safety issues. Prior to this appointment, Tate-Nadeau served as executive director of the Chicago Office of Emergency Management and Communications where she implemented and managed the third largest 9-1-1 call center in the nation.

Prior to joining the Pritzker administration, Alicia Tate-Nadeau spent more than three decades with the Illinois National Guard. Her time in the military included serving as the assistant adjutant general for the Illinois National Guard and concurrently as the deputy commanding general, Army National Guard, United States Army Maneuver Support Center of Excellence in Fort Leonard Wood, Missouri, as well as tours overseas with missions in Iraq and Israel.

Tate-Nadeau is also active in several civic organizations. She serves on the board of directors of the American Red Cross in Chicago and Northern Illinois.

She participates weekly in the Big Brothers Big Sisters of America program in Springfield, Illinois. In her capacity as Retired Brigadier General, Tate-Nadeau, is a member of Mission: Readiness, the nonpartisan national security organization of over 700 retired admirals and generals who strengthen national security by ensuring kids stay in school, stay fit, and stay out of trouble.
