= Illinois National Guard =

American military and law enforcement unit

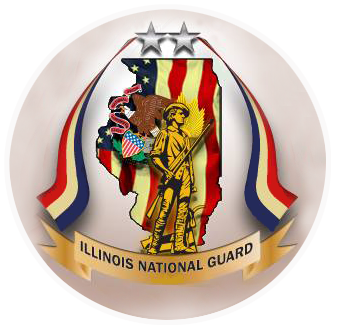
- Seal of the Illinois National Guard
- Active: 1877-Present
- Country: United States of America
- Allegiance: Illinois
- Branch: Army / Air Force
- Size: 13,380
- Garrison/HQ: Camp Lincoln, Springfield, Illinois
- Mottos: "Always Ready, Always There"

Commanders
- Adjutant General: Major General Rodney Boyd
- Senior Enlisted Leader: Command Sergeant Major Kehinde Salami

The Illinois National Guard comprises both Army National Guard and Air National Guard components of Illinois. As of 2013, the Illinois National Guard has approximately 13,200 members. The National Guard is the only United States military force empowered to function in a state status. The Constitution of the United States specifically charges the National Guard with dual federal and state missions. Those functions range from limited actions during non-emergency situations to full scale law enforcement of martial law when local law enforcement officials can no longer maintain civil control. The National Guard may be called into federal service in response to a call by the president or Congress.

== History ==
=== Illinois Territorial Militia ===
During the War of 1812, the Illinois Territory was the scene of fighting between Native Americans and United States soldiers and settlers. There were few U.S. Army soldiers this far west on the frontier. Ninian Edwards, the territorial governor, directed state militia operations.

=== Illinois National Guard ===
The two components are the:

- Illinois Army National Guard
- Illinois Air National Guard

When National Guard troops are called to federal service, the president serves as commander-In-chief. The federal mission assigned to the National Guard is: "To provide properly trained and equipped units for prompt mobilization for war, National emergency or as otherwise needed."

The governor may call individuals or units of the Illinois National Guard into state service during emergencies or to assist in special situations which lend themselves to use of the National Guard. The state mission assigned to the National Guard is: "To provide trained and disciplined forces for domestic emergencies or as otherwise provided by state law."

National Guard units can be mobilized at any time by presidential order to supplement regular armed forces, and upon declaration of a state of emergency by the governor of the state in which they serve. Unlike Army Reserve members, National Guard members cannot be mobilized individually (except through voluntary transfers and Temporary Duty Assignments), but only as part of their respective units. However, there has been a significant number of individual activations to support military operations from 2001; the legality of this policy is an unresolved issue within the National Guard.

== Members ==
- William J. Warfield, African American who rose to become brigadier general
- Daniel M. Krumrei, adjutant general
- Richard Hayes, adjutant general
- LeAnne Withrow, Staff Sergeant and first openly transgender member of the Illinois National Guard
- Alicia Tate-Nadeau, first woman to be promoted to brigadier general in the Illinois National Guard
- Dena Ballowe Command Sgt. Maj., first woman to serve as Senior Enlisted Leader in the Illinois National Guard

== See also ==
- Illinois Naval Militia
- Illinois Reserve Militia
