= Jeremiah J. Lynch =

Irish-born American judge in Butte, Montana (1871–1961)

- Lynch pictured as a member of the planning committee for Butte's 1919 St. Patrick's Day celebration.

Judge of the Montana Second Judicial District Court (Silver Bow County)
- In office January 1907 – January 1932
- Succeeded by: T. E. Downey
- In office January 1937 – January 1949
- Preceded by: Frank L. Riley
- Succeeded by: John B. McClernan

First Assistant Montana Attorney General
- In office January 1933 – 1936

Personal details
- Born: January 9, 1871 Ballycrovane, Eyeries, County Cork, Ireland
- Died: September 28, 1961 (aged 90) Butte, Montana, U.S.
- Resting place: Holy Cross Cemetery, Butte
- Party: Democratic
- Spouse: Margaret Kelly (m. 1904)
- Children: 7
- Education: Kent College of Law (LL.B., 1899)

Military service
- Allegiance: United States
- Branch/service: United States Army (Volunteers)
- Years of service: 1898
- Rank: Private; promoted to corporal (see text)
- Unit: 7th Illinois Volunteer Infantry
- Battles/wars: Spanish–American War

Jeremiah J. Lynch (January 9, 1871 – September 28, 1961) was an Irish-born American lawyer and jurist who served as a judge of the Second Judicial District Court of Montana, sitting in Butte, for thirty-seven years between 1907 and 1949. A former Anaconda mine carman who paid his own way through law school, Lynch was the state's senior district judge at his retirement and, according to historian David M. Emmons, "unquestionably the dominant force in the Butte Irish community" for much of the first half of the twentieth century.

Lynch's name appeared on the Silver Bow County ballot eighteen times and was defeated only once, in the 1932 Democratic primary. He returned to the bench in 1937 after a contested recount that reached the Montana Supreme Court. Outside the courtroom he was a leading figure in the Ancient Order of Hibernians, the Robert Emmet Literary Association, and the Friends of Irish Freedom in Butte, chaired the city's Irish Victory Fund, and formally welcomed Éamon de Valera to Butte in 1919.

== Early life ==
Lynch was born on January 9, 1871, in the farming and fishing townland of Ballycrovane, in the parish of Eyeries on the Beara Peninsula of County Cork, Ireland, the eldest of the eight children of John Lynch, a farmer-fisherman, and Johanna (née Sullivan) Lynch. He attended the national schools of the district until he was eighteen; a 1921 county history records that he was among the pupils of William Dwyer, long-time principal of the schools at Castletownbere. Lynch later said that reading books as a boy had made him resolve to become a lawyer "if at all possible".

He sailed from Queenstown on May 18, 1890, aboard the City of Rome, and worked for three months as a deckhand on the Fall River Line steamers between Fall River and New York for $34 a month before setting out for Butte, where four Harrington cousins had settled.

== Mining years ==
Lynch arrived in Butte in September 1890 and for most of the next seven years worked underground in the "Hill" mines as a carman, shoveler, station tender, and miner, including on the 300-foot level of the Anaconda mine, and at the Green Mountain and St. Lawrence mines. During the shutdown of the Butte mines in 1891 he worked in the Ontario drain tunnel near Park City, Utah, and in the Keystone mine at Eureka in the Tintic Mining District; when the mines closed again in early 1893 he worked as a longshoreman and coal heaver on the Old Dominion pier in New York before returning to Butte in May 1893, in the midst of the Panic of 1893. He was a member of the Butte Miners' Union and represented it in the Silver Bow Trades and Labor Assembly.

By 1897 he had saved enough to enter law school. His last shift in the mines was on July 4, 1897, which Butte had worked because Marcus Daly had scheduled horse races in Anaconda for the following day; he left for Chicago that evening to enrol at the Kent College of Law under Dean Marshall D. Ewell.

== Spanish–American War ==
When the United States declared war on Spain in April 1898, Lynch left his classes and enlisted as a private in the 7th Illinois Volunteer Infantry, a Chicago regiment. The regiment trained at Springfield, Illinois, and at Camp Alger, Virginia, where typhoid broke out in the ranks; Lynch later recalled marching over the Bull Run battlefield and swimming the Bull Run river. The Illinois Adjutant General's muster-out rolls record a Jeremiah Lynch of Chicago who enrolled in Company K on April 26, 1898, was mustered in at Springfield on May 18, and was promoted to corporal on July 1, 1898. (Note: The same roll lists a second Jeremiah Lynch, a private in Company G who enrolled on July 2, 1898, and joined the regiment at Camp Alger. Lynch's own account, that he enlisted when war was declared in April 1898, matches the Company K entry.) The regiment saw no combat and was mustered out in Chicago in October 1898. Lynch remained active in the United Spanish War Veterans for the rest of his life.

== Legal career ==
Lynch returned to Kent and graduated at the head of his class in June 1899, receiving law books as prizes. He took the Montana bar examination before the Montana Supreme Court in December 1899, was admitted on December 18, 1899, and passed with the notation "cum laude", one of the justices remarking that his answers were "as clear as a bell". He practised in Butte and from May 1901 to August 1904 served as deputy county attorney of Silver Bow County under Peter Breen, appearing as counsel in several cases before the Montana Supreme Court.

== Judicial career ==
=== First period on the bench, 1907–1932 ===
In 1906 the Silver Bow County Democratic convention nominated Lynch for an unexpired term as judge of the Second Judicial District. He was elected in November 1906 and took office in January 1907, and was re-elected in 1908, 1912, 1916, 1920, 1924, and 1928. His 1920 campaign was endorsed by Butte's Nonpartisan–Labor League, and his platform declared that "favor ought not to be able to bend justice, power to break it, nor money to corrupt it".

From 1907 to 1919 Lynch tried civil cases almost exclusively, and from 1919 to 1933 he presided over the county's criminal calendar. Early rulings that drew statewide notice included a February 1908 order directing the receiver of the failed Aetna Bank to sue former director F. Augustus Heinze for $97,500, and a May 1909 decision holding that an Interstate Telegraph Company service for wiring bets on out-of-state horse races was an evasion of Montana's new anti-poolroom law. In the Shea case he upheld the constitutionality of Montana's Workmen's Compensation Act. The largest civil matter he tried was the claim of three Missouri women to a children's share of the estimated $50 million estate of Senator William A. Clark; the claim collapsed when the evidence showed they were daughters of William Anderson Clark, a Butte grocer, and the jury's unanimous verdict against them was never appealed.

Between 1919 and 1925 Lynch presided over two jury terms a year, each lasting up to three months; in one session he tried nine men for murder in succession. Over his career he pronounced the death sentence seven times. Four sentences were commuted by the governor; the men hanged were William and Monte Harris, unrelated partners in a gang that killed roadhouse operator Cyril Schilling, executed in Butte on April 20, 1923, and Tony Vettere, a triple murderer hanged on October 1, 1926, the last judicial execution in Butte. Lynch later said that he felt no hesitation in those cases, "since the crimes in each case were vicious and without extenuating circumstances". He was equally willing to set a verdict aside: in the trials of "Peaches" Webbe and Frances Steel, accused of poisoning two ex-soldiers, he refused to sentence Webbe after a jury convicted him, granted a new trial, and saw both defendants cleared when a witness came forward to say the victims had died after a beer-and-morphine spree in his cabin.

Lynch was several times called to sit on the Montana Supreme Court in place of a disqualified justice, including in a series of cases decided in late 1922, and he held court by invitation in more than a dozen other Montana counties. His 1936 campaign biography stated that his career on the bench "brought few reversals". He was also a supporter of organized labor, and spoke at a mass meeting at Columbia Gardens in the summer of 1917 in support of Butte's striking miners.

=== Defeat, attorney general's office, and the 1936 recount ===
In the August 1932 Democratic primary Lynch, by then one of the senior district judges in Montana, was defeated, and he left the bench in January 1932 after twenty-five years. (Note: Contemporary sources say he served "from January 1907 to January 1932" and lost the 1932 primary; the 1948 Montana Standard profile describes him as serving "continuously until he lost the 1932 primary", and the Montana Judicial Branch lists his first period as 1907–1932.) Attorney General-elect Raymond T. Nagle named him First Assistant Attorney General in December 1932, citing "his standing and long public service", and Lynch served in Helena from January 1933, representing the state in cases involving its insurance, relief, and convict-labor laws. From 1933 to 1937 he was also engaged in probate work.

Lynch filed again for district judge in June 1936, stating his motto as "even-handed justice so far as humanly possible". In the general election of November 3, 1936, four candidates contested the two Silver Bow County judgeships, and Lynch appeared to have lost to the incumbent, Frank L. Riley. Lynch alleged that the county canvassing board had, "arbitrarily, and in disregard of the tally sheets", credited Riley with 48 more votes than the tally sheet showed in one precinct, and on November 19 the Montana Supreme Court issued a peremptory writ of mandate ordering the board to canvass the returns according to the tally sheets (State ex rel. Lynch v. Batani). Lynch then obtained a recount of forty-three precincts under a new state recount law; because both sitting judges had been candidates, the governor assigned Judge Leiper of Glendive to hear the application. In one precinct the board found nineteen more judicial ballots than there were voters; the recount gave Lynch the seat by 159 votes, and in January 1937 the Supreme Court denied Riley's petition to review the proceedings.

=== Second period on the bench, 1937–1949 ===
Lynch returned to the bench in January 1937, sharing jurisdiction over all classes of cases with Judge T. E. Downey of Department Two, and was re-elected in 1940 and 1944. By 1948 he was the senior district judge in Montana in length of service, and the Silver Bow County Bar Association honored him with a testimonial dinner in 1946. He announced in June 1948 that he would not seek an eleventh term and retired in January 1949, a week before his seventy-eighth birthday, after thirty-seven years on the bench. The Montana Judicial Branch lists him as the third-longest-serving district judge in the state's history. A contemporary profile described him as "the tall, straight-shouldered figure, the booming Irish voice and the hard derby hats" woven "into the color of Butte", and noted the "meticulous care with which he draws his large and unmistakable signature".

== Irish-American community leadership ==
Lynch was for half a century one of the principal organizers of Irish nationalist and fraternal life in Butte, and belonged to the Ancient Order of Hibernians, the Gaelic Athletic Association, the Friends of Irish Freedom, and the Robert Emmet Literary Association. He often used his chambers to host committee meetings of the city's Irish associations. He was a documented member of the secret Robert Emmet Literary Association, founded the Patrick Pearse Club of the Irish Volunteers, and was, with John J. O'Meara and Maurice English, a co-founder of Butte's Friendly Sons of St. Patrick in 1908. In the Ancient Order of Hibernians he was a delegate from Silver Bow Division No. 1 to the Montana state conventions of 1904 and 1914, chaired the resolutions committee of the 1910 state convention, which declared for "the complete and absolute independence of Ireland", and was installed as president of Division No. 1 in January 1913. He captained a Gaelic football team at the Butte Gaelic League's picnic in 1911, and in 1916 was a signatory to the call that organized a Butte branch of the Friends of Irish Freedom.

Lynch chaired Butte's St. Patrick's Day celebrations for many years and presided over the Robert Emmet anniversary commemoration in 1919, at which "self-determination for Ireland" was the theme. As chairman of Butte's Irish Victory Fund committee he raised more than $11,000 in 1919, and it was his letter of invitation, sent on behalf of Butte's Irish, that brought Éamon de Valera, President of Dáil Éireann, to the city on July 25–26, 1919, during his American tour; Lynch boarded de Valera's train at Melrose to welcome him and introduced him at the Butte rally as "a man of solid patriotism". In January 1920 the committee to sell bonds of the Irish Republic in Montana was organized in Lynch's courtroom, where he told the meeting that "the liberation of Ireland is as sure as the fact that we are sitting here". He was also a member of the Knights of Columbus and the Serra Club.

His papers, including his Spanish–American War uniform, personal library, and files on Irish relief, Irish Republic bonds, and the Wheeler for President Club, are held by the Butte-Silver Bow Public Archives as the Jeremiah Lynch Collection.

== Personal life ==
On February 10, 1904, Lynch married Margaret Kelly of Walkerville at St. Lawrence O'Toole Church, in a ceremony performed by Father Francis X. Batens, S.J. (Note: The Montana Judicial Branch biography gives the marriage date as February 11, 1904.) They had seven children: Mary Margaret, Catherine Aileen, Anna Bridget, Ellen Ita, John Emmett, Rosaleen Agnes, and Esther Maria. Their only son, John Emmett Lynch, worked for the United States Department of Justice in San Francisco. In 1918 the Lynches bought the Queen Anne house at 517 West Silver Street in Butte, now a contributing property in the Butte National Historic Landmark District, where Margaret Lynch, "renowned for her hospitality", raised the family.

After his retirement Lynch remained in Butte and planned a three-month visit to his brother and sister in Ireland, declaring that he would visit neither London, Paris, nor Rome. He celebrated his ninetieth birthday in January 1961 and in June 1961 met Senator Mike Mansfield with fellow Spanish–American War veterans. Lynch died of a long-standing heart ailment at his Butte home on the morning of September 28, 1961, aged 90; at his death he was one of the oldest active members of the Montana bar and one of three surviving active members of the Henry W. Lawton camp of the United Spanish War Veterans in Butte. His obituary described him as "intensely loyal" to both the United States and Ireland, and as "a familiar figure on Butte streets".

A solemn requiem Mass was celebrated at St. Patrick's Church, Butte, on October 2, 1961, by Monsignor M. M. English, who also delivered the eulogy, with a dozen other priests in the sanctuary. Montana's members of Congress, state, county, and city officials, and the members of the Montana and Silver Bow bar associations, the Friendly Sons of St. Patrick, and the Butte Serra Club were named honorary pallbearers; the Spanish War Veterans, assisted by the American Legion and Veterans of Foreign Wars, gave military honors, with District Judge John B. McClernan among the color guard. He was buried in Holy Cross Cemetery, Butte.
