= Ewell (disambiguation) =

Ewell is a village in Surrey, England.

Ewell may also refer to:

== Places ==
- Ewell, Alabama
- Ewell, Kansas
- Ewell, Maryland
- Ewell, Virginia

== Other uses ==
- Ewell (name)

== See also ==
- Epsom and Ewell, a local government district
- Epsom and Ewell (UK Parliament constituency)
- Epsom & Ewell F.C., football club
- Ewell Castle School
- Ewell East railway station
- Ewell West railway station
- Ewell Minnis, a village in Kent
- Temple Ewell, a village in Kent
