= Ernest Greene =

American state legislator from Illinois

Ernest Greene was a lawyer and state legislator in Illinois. He was elected to the Illinois House of Representatives from Cook County.

He studied at Talladega College and Kent College of Law. He was elected in 1936. He also served as a Chicago Ward Committeeman.
