= Dunshea =

Dunshea is a surname. Notable people with the surname include:

- John Dunshea (born 1943), Australian footballer
- Lyndon Dunshea (born 1991), New Zealand rugby union player
- Mitchell Dunshea (born 1995), New Zealand rugby union player

== See also ==
- Dunshee
