= Dunshee =

Dunshee is a surname. Notable people with the surname include:

- Esther Dunshee Bower (1879–1962), American lawyer
- Antônio Augusto Dunshee de Abranches (1936–2025), Brazilian sports executive
- Hans Dunshee (born 1953), American politician from Washington state
- Parker Dunshee (born 1995), American baseball pitcher

== See also ==
- Dunshea
