= Charles P. Kindregan Jr. =

American lawyer

Charles P. Kindregan Jr. (June 18, 1935 – April 19, 2016) was a professor of law at Suffolk University Law School in Boston, with a speciality in assisted reproduction law.

Kindregan received a BA and MA from La Salle University, a Juris Doctor from Chicago–Kent College of Law of the Illinois Institute of Technology and an LL.M from Northwestern University Law School. Kindregan taught at Virginia Military Institute from 1961 to 1962 and then became an assistant professor at Loyola Law School from 1963 to 1967. In 1967 he was appointed an assistant professor at Suffolk University Law School, serving in this position from 1967 to 1969. He became an associate professor in 1968 and a full professor in 1972. In the 1970’s, Kindregan served as the faculty advisor for the student produced magazine at Suffolk Law, “The Advocate.” Kindregan continued to teach at Suffolk and served as associate dean from 1990 to 1994.

Kindregan's work at Suffolk included the founding of the Suffolk University Program of Advanced Legal Studies, which brought practicing lawyers back to law school to develop their education post-graduation. The program gave rise to others like it throughout the country, as well as in England, Ireland, and even Cuba. He served as director of advanced legal studies from 1980 to 1988. He was appointed distinguished professor for research and scholarship in 2005.

Kindregan studied the American Civil War and vacationed in Maine with his family in his free time. He was a member of the Union Club of Boston.

Kindregan authored or co-authored texts on family law and torts, including the American Bar Association book on assisted reproduction. He also led the ABA committee to form the model rules in this area.
