= Pablo Almaguer =

American lawyer (born 1971)

Pablo J. Almaguer
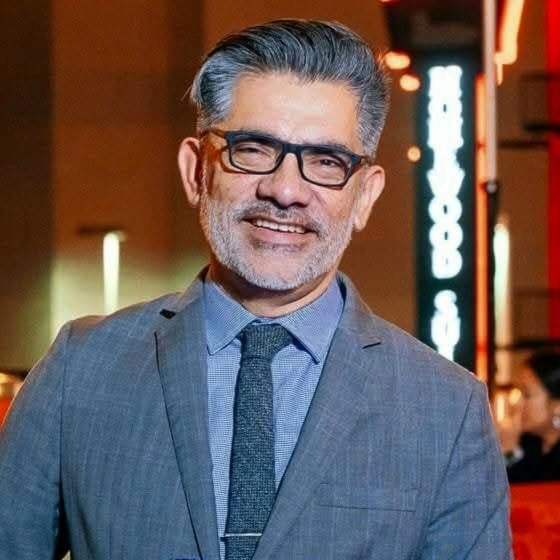
- Born: Pablo Javier Almaguér; May 7, 1971 (age 55); Reynosa, Mexico
- Education: University of Texas–Pan American (BA); Chicago-Kent College of Law (JD)
- Occupation: Lawyer
- Spouse: Linley Boone (m. 2009; div. 2021)
- Children: 2

Pablo Javier Almaguér (born May 7, 1971) is an American lawyer from McAllen, Texas. He is a former chair of the State Bar of Texas Board of Directors, a former Senior Attorney Fellow at the Texas Immigration Law Council, and is currently Director of the Texas A&M University Colonias Program.

== Biography ==
Almaguer was the first legal aid lawyer to serve on the State Bar of Texas Board of Directors, and the first attorney from Hidalgo County to be elected to the position of chair.

Almaguer is a graduate of the University of Texas–Pan American, and did his graduate work at Chicago-Kent College of Law. He was previously branch manager of the Edinburg branch of Texas RioGrande Legal Aid. During the COVID-19 pandemic, Almaguer commented publicly on housing insecurity and eviction issues affecting undocumented immigrants in Texas.

He is a former president of the board of directors for the Texas Civil Rights Project. Almaguer was also involved in initiatives focused on expanding access to legal services in the Rio Grande Valley, including a medical-legal partnership associated with Texas A&M University School of Law.

== Miscellaneous ==
- New Medical Legal Partnership story in TAMU School of Law Newspaper
- Texas Center for Legal Ethics - About Pablo Almaguer
- Pablo J. Almaguer's Linkedin Page
- The Pablo J. Almaguer Public Interest Law Fellowship
- Texas A&M University names new Colonias Program Director
