= Mark L. Walker =

American politician

Mark Walker
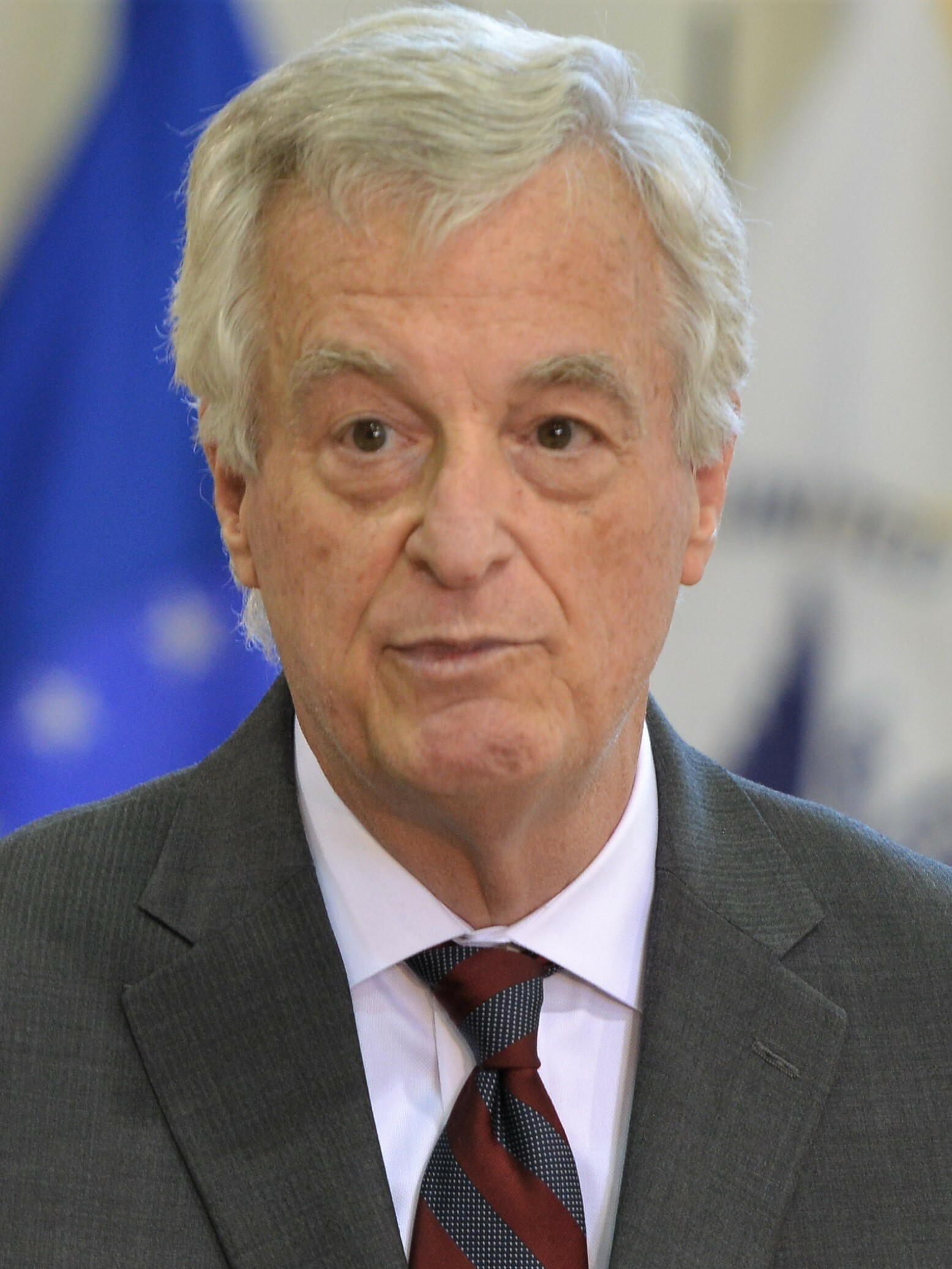
- Walker, in 2021

Member of the Illinois Senate from the 27th district
- Incumbent
- Assumed office May 11, 2024
- Preceded by: Ann Gillespie

Member of the Illinois House of Representatives from the 53rd district
- In office January 9, 2019 – May 11, 2024
- Preceded by: David Harris
- Succeeded by: Nicolle Grasse

Member of the Illinois House of Representatives from the 66th district
- In office January 2009 – January 2011
- Preceded by: Carolyn H. Krause
- Succeeded by: David Harris

Personal details
- Born: 1947 or 1948 (age 77–78)
- Party: Democratic
- Spouse: Joan
- Education: Brown University (BA, MA)

Mark L. Walker (born 1947/1948) is a Democratic member of the Illinois Senate for the 27th district. The district, located in the Chicago metropolitan area, includes parts of Arlington Heights, Hoffman Estates, Des Plaines, Mount Prospect, Rolling Meadows, Barrington, Inverness, Palatine, Prospect Heights and South Barrington.

He previously served in the Illinois House of Representatives, representing the 66th district from 2009 to 2011 and the 53rd district from 2019 to 2024.

== Biography ==
Walker served in the United States Army during the Vietnam War and during his service was awarded a Bronze Star. He later became a senior executive as Citigroup, including heading worldwide credit card operations. He then went into consulting at Walker Information; providing business expertise to various firms. He has also been a soccer coach and member of the Arlington Heights Park District Foundation board, and has co-chaired the Northwest Suburban Veterans Advisory Council. He has also worked with homeless organizations, and on community housing redevelopment. Mark Walker has a Bachelor of Arts and a master's degree in culture change from Brown University.

== Electoral career ==
In 2008, Walker defeated Republican candidate and Elk Grove Village trustee Christine Prochno to succeed outgoing Representative Carolyn Krause. He served a single term during the 96th General Assembly. Walker was defeated in the 2010 general election by Republican David Harris who preceded Krause in the Illinois House. After Harris retired, Walker announced his intention to run for his seat. He defeated Republican nominee Eddie Corrigan and took office January 9, 2019.

Walker is also the Democratic Committeeman for Wheeling Township.

In May 2024, Walker was appointed to the Illinois Senate to replace former District 27 senator Ann Gillespie.

== Illinois House of Representatives ==
=== Committees ===
As of 2022, Walker serves on six House committees and one subcommittee:

- Financial Institutions committee (Chairperson)
- International Trade & Commerce committee (Chairperson)
- Economic Opportunity & Equity committee
- Insurance committee
- Revenue & Finance committee
- Small Business, Tech Innovation, and Entrepreneurship committee
- Sales, Amusement, & Other Taxes subcommittee

=== Legislation ===
While representing Illinois' 53rd House district, legislation introduced by Walker that went on to become law includes HB3865, which requires any company or individual advertising veterans' benefits appeal services to disclose in the advertisement that such services are available at no cost by county veterans service officers, among other provisions.

== Electoral history ==
Illinois 66th State House District General Election, 2008
Party	Candidate	Votes	%
Democratic	Mark Walker	21,758	52.47
Republican	Christine K. Prochno	19,710	47.53
Total votes		41,468	100.0

Illinois 66th State House District General Election, 2010
Party	Candidate	Votes	%
Republican	David Harris	16,147	53.99
Democratic	Mark Walker (incumbent)	13,763	46.01
Total votes		29,910	100.00

Illinois 53rd State House District General Election, 2018
Party	Candidate	Votes	%
Democratic	Mark L. Walker	23,792	52.44
Republican	Eddie Corrigan	21,580	47.56
Total votes		45,372	100.00

Illinois 53rd State House District General Election, 2020
Party	Candidate	Votes	%
Democratic	Mark L. Walker	40,255	100.00
Total votes		40,255	100.00
