= Joseph M. Bailey =

American judge

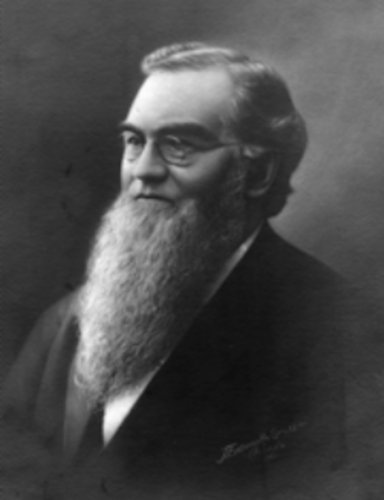
Bailey's portrait at the Illinois Supreme Court.

Joseph Mead Bailey (June 22, 1833 – October 17, 1895) was an American jurist and politician.

== Early life ==
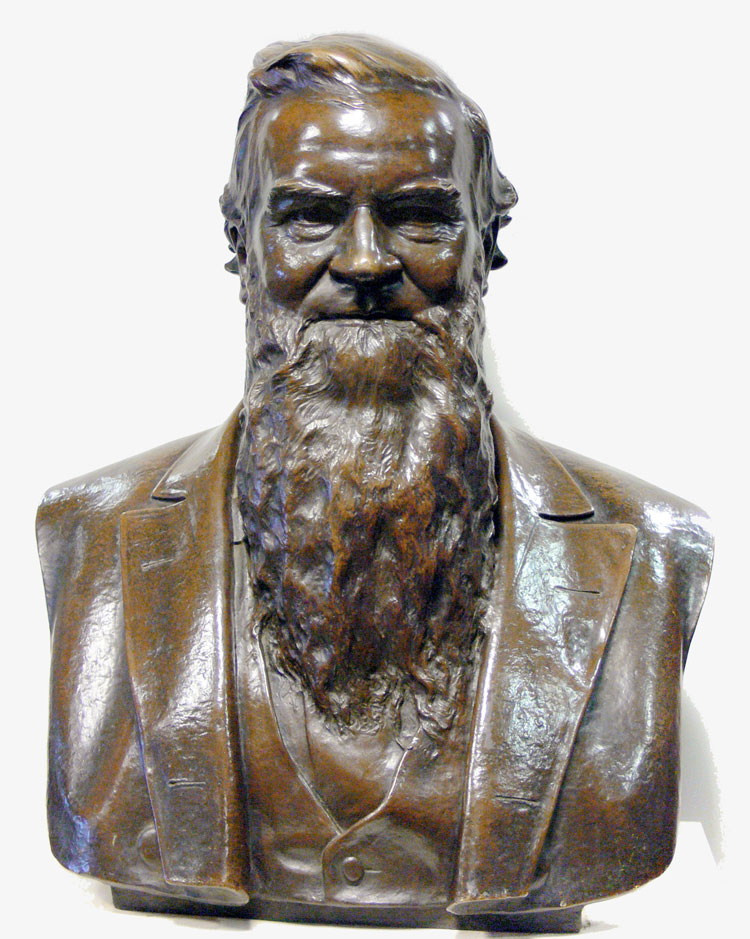
A bust of Bailey

Bailey was born in Middlebury, New York, to deacon and farmer Aaron (1801–1876) and Maria (née Braman, 1806–1880) Bailey. Through his mother, Bailey was a descendant of William Bradford, the governor of Plymouth Colony.

== Education and career ==
Bailey received his bachelor's degree from University of Rochester in 1854. Bailey studied law and was admitted to the New York bar in 1856. Bailey moved to Freeport, Illinois where he practiced law. From 1867 to 1871, Bailey served in the Illinois House of Representatives and was a Republican. In 1877, Bailey was elected Illinois circuit court and, then in 1888, was appointed to the Illinois Appellate Court. In 1888, Bailey founded the Chicago College of Law with only 18 students and acted as its first dean. From 1888 until his death in 1895, Bailey served on the Illinois Supreme Court and was the chief justice of the court. Bailey died in his home in Freeport, Illinois after a long illness.

Sculptor Johannes Gelert memorialized Bailey with a bronze bust that now is located near the library elevator at the Chicago-Kent College of Law.

== Personal life ==
In 1859, Bailey married Anna Olin (1833–1928), daughter of John Olin and Maria Smith. They had five children, and three survived to adulthood.

- Charles Olin Bailey (July 2, 1860 - December 20, 1928)
- Wallace Bailey (February 26, 1863 - September 19, 1863)
- Joseph Mead "Joe" Bailey (November 7, 1864 - September 12, 1891)
- John Aaron Bailey (March 27, 1869 - November 18, 1876)
- Anna Maria Bailey (April 30, 1876 - July 6, 1898)
