= Center for Computer-Assisted Legal Instruction =

US nonprofit organization

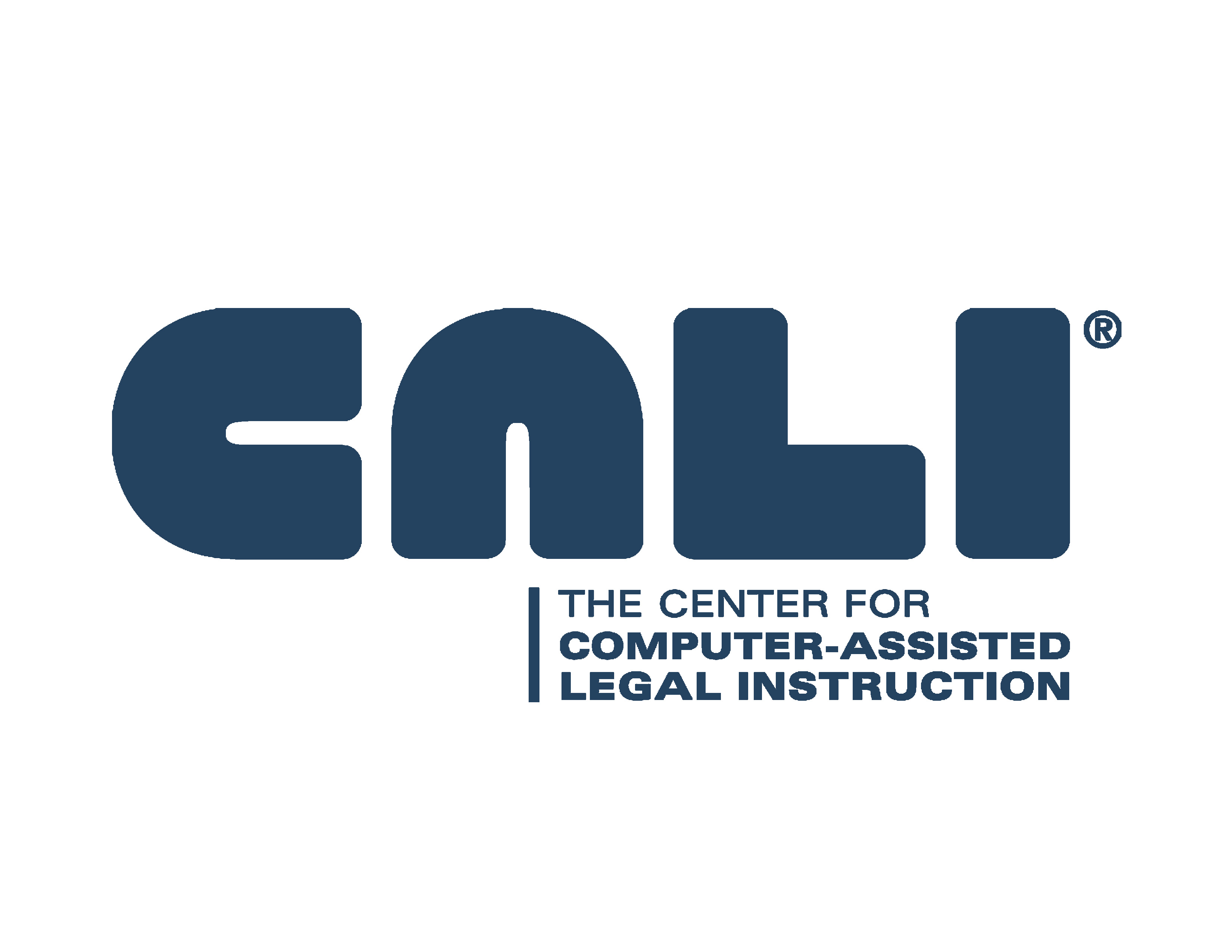
- Founded: June 22, 1982; 44 years ago
- Type: Education
- Purpose: Legal Education, Legal Study Aids, access to justice, formative assessment, open textbook, experiential learning, Law School Success
- Location: Chicago, Illinois (Chicago-Kent College of Law); Minneapolis, Minnesota (University of Minnesota Law School); Atlanta, Georgia (Atlanta's John Marshall Law School)
- Region served: United States, Some International
- Method: Computer-Aided Learning and Teaching
- Members: Over 90% of US law schools are members
- Employees: 11
- Website: cali.org

The Center for Computer-Assisted Legal Instruction, also known as CALI, is a 501(c)(3) nonprofit that does research and development in online legal education. CALI publishes over 1,200 interactive tutorials, free casebooks, and develops software for experiential learning. Over 90% of US law schools are members which provide students with unlimited and free access to these materials.

CALI was incorporated in 1982 in the state of Minnesota by the University of Minnesota Law School and Harvard Law School. The cost of membership to CALI is US$8,700 per year for US law schools; free for legal-aid organizations, library schools, state and county law librarians; and US$300 per year for law firms, paralegal programs, undergraduate departments, government agencies, individuals, and other organizations.

== Services ==
=== CALI Lessons ===
CALI Lessons are interactive tutorials written by law faculty covering various law study material in 20–40 minute lessons.

=== Free/Open Casebooks ===
CALI hires law faculty to write casebooks and other legal education textbooks and provides them for anyone to download under a Creative Commons license. Print versions are also available.

=== CALIcon Conference ===
CALI's CALIcon is a two-day conference where faculty, law librarians, tech staff and educational technologists gather to share ideas, experiences and expertise. Exhibitors have included legal and education researchers as well as law companies.

CALI first hosted The Conference for Law School Computing in 1991 (then known as the Conference for Law School Computing Professionals) at Chicago-Kent. From 1991 to 1994 the conference was hosted at Chicago-Kent, and since 1995 the conference has been hosted on-site by various CALI member law schools.

=== CALI Excellence for the Future Award ===
The CALI Excellence for the Future Award is awarded to the students who receives the highest grade in a course as determined by the instructor and the law school administration. Over 130 law school participate in the awards program which was started in 1995 and as give out over 400,000 CALI Awards since. Awardees receive a printed certificate and a permanent URL Virtual Award that they can link to from their online resumes or biographies.
