= Thomas P. Barnett =

American architect and painter (1870–1929)

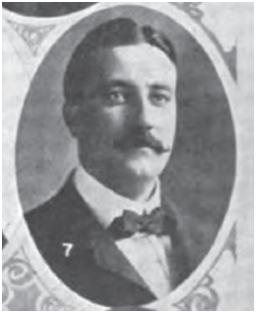
- Tom P. Barnett in 1904
- Born: February 11, 1870; St. Louis, Missouri, U.S.
- Died: September 23, 1929 (aged 59); Gloucester, Massachusetts, U.S.
- Known for: Architecture & Painting
- Notable work: Buildings: Cathedral Basilica of St. Louis, Adolphus Hotel, Busch Mausoleum Paintings: Close of a Winter Day, Forest Park Landscape, Riches of the Mines

Thomas P. Barnett (February 11, 1870 – September 23, 1929), also known professionally as Tom Barnett and Tom P. Barnett, was an American architect and painter from St. Louis, Missouri. Barnett was nationally recognized for both his work in architecture and in painting.

== Architectural work ==
Barnett trained under his father, St. Louis architect George I. Barnett, who was known for designing public landmarks such as the renovation of the Old Courthouse, the Missouri Governor's Mansion, and the structures of the Missouri Botanical Garden. In painting, the younger Barnett trained at the St. Louis School of Fine Arts, with a fair list of awards and exhibitions.

After graduating Saint Louis University in 1886, Tom Barnett joined with his brother and brother-in-law, George Dennis Barnett and John Ignatius Haynes, to form the architectural firm Barnett, Haynes & Barnett. The firm continued the traditional motifs of the elder George Barnett. The combined legacy of two generations of Barnett designs were largely responsible for Classicism being the dominant architectural influence in St. Louis.

In 1904, Barnett served on the Commission of Architects for the Louisiana Purchase Exposition (better known as the St. Louis World's Fair) and personally designed the Palace of Liberal Arts for which he earned the fair's Gold Medal for Architecture. The following year, he would win the Bronze Medal for Architecture at the Lewis and Clark Centennial Exposition in Portland, Oregon.

Other projects designed by Barnett included commercial buildings, residential (including private places), and a significant number of religious structures. Surviving examples include the Cathedral Basilica of St. Louis, the Adolphus Hotel in Dallas, Texas, and the Saint Clement Catholic Church in Chicago.

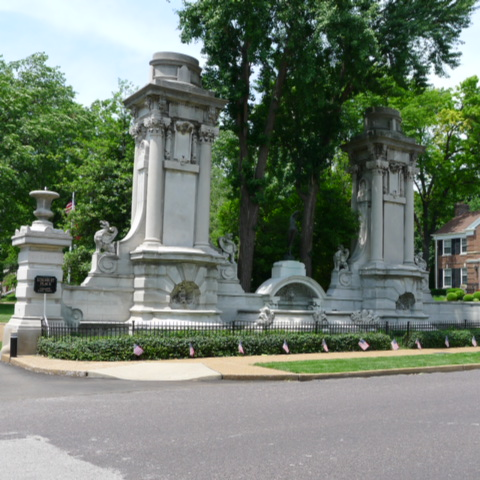
Kingsbury Place in St. Louis, 1902

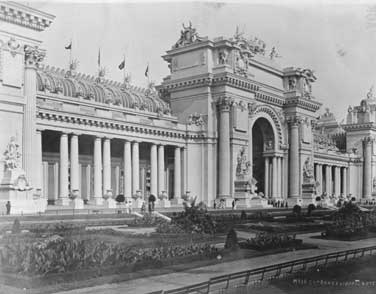
Palace of Liberal Arts at the 1904 World's Fair

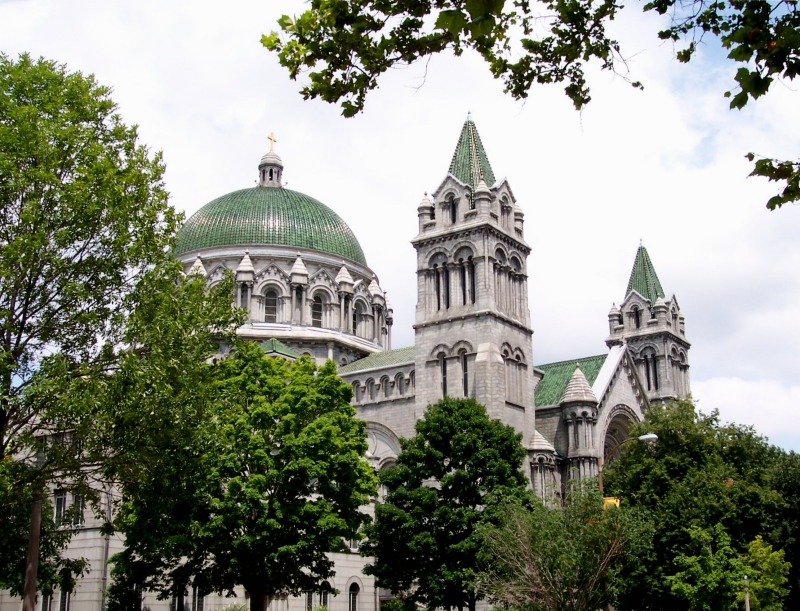
Cathedral Basilica of St. Louis, 1912

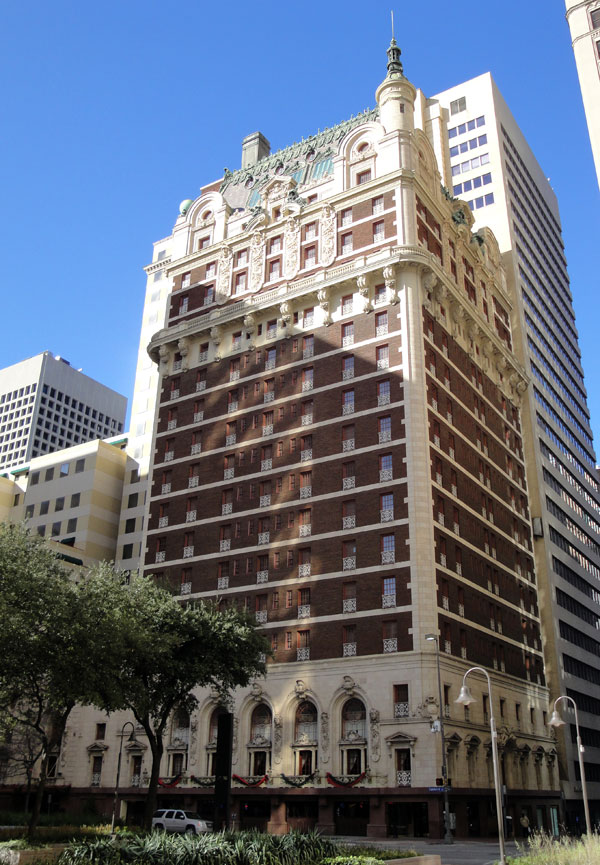
Adolphus Hotel in Dallas, 1912

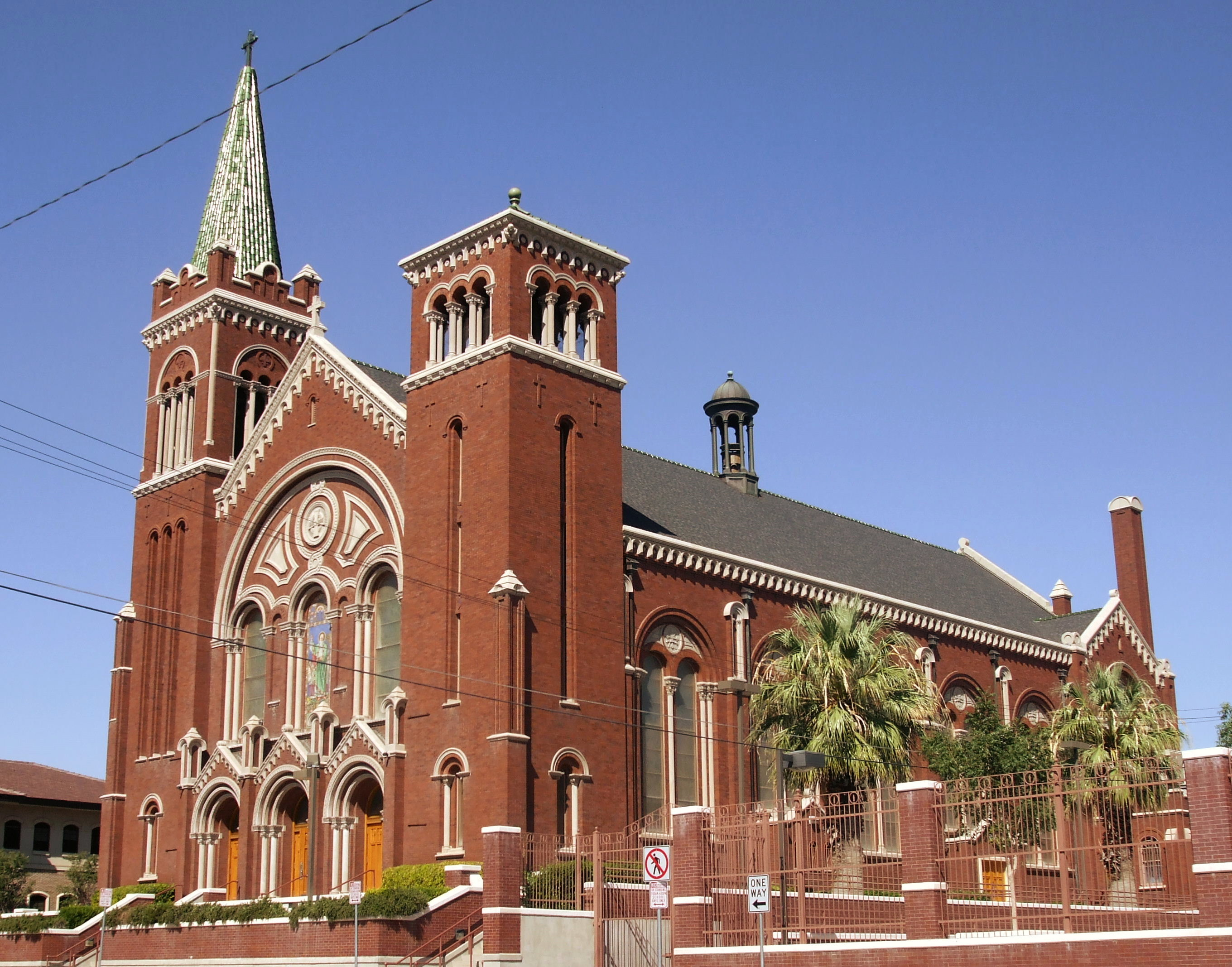
Cathedral of St. Patrick in El Paso, 1914

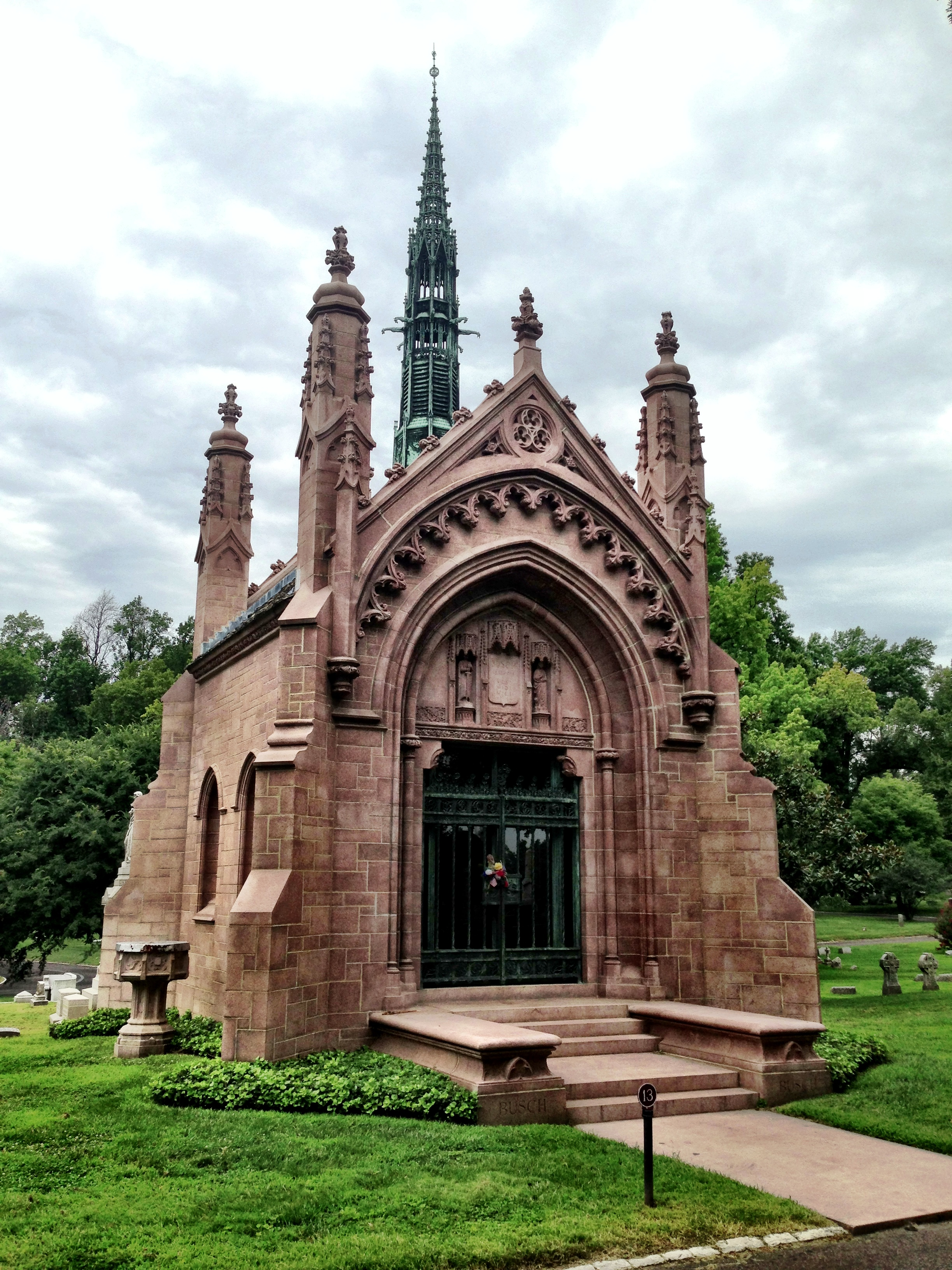
Busch Mausoleum in Bellefontaine Cemetery, 1915

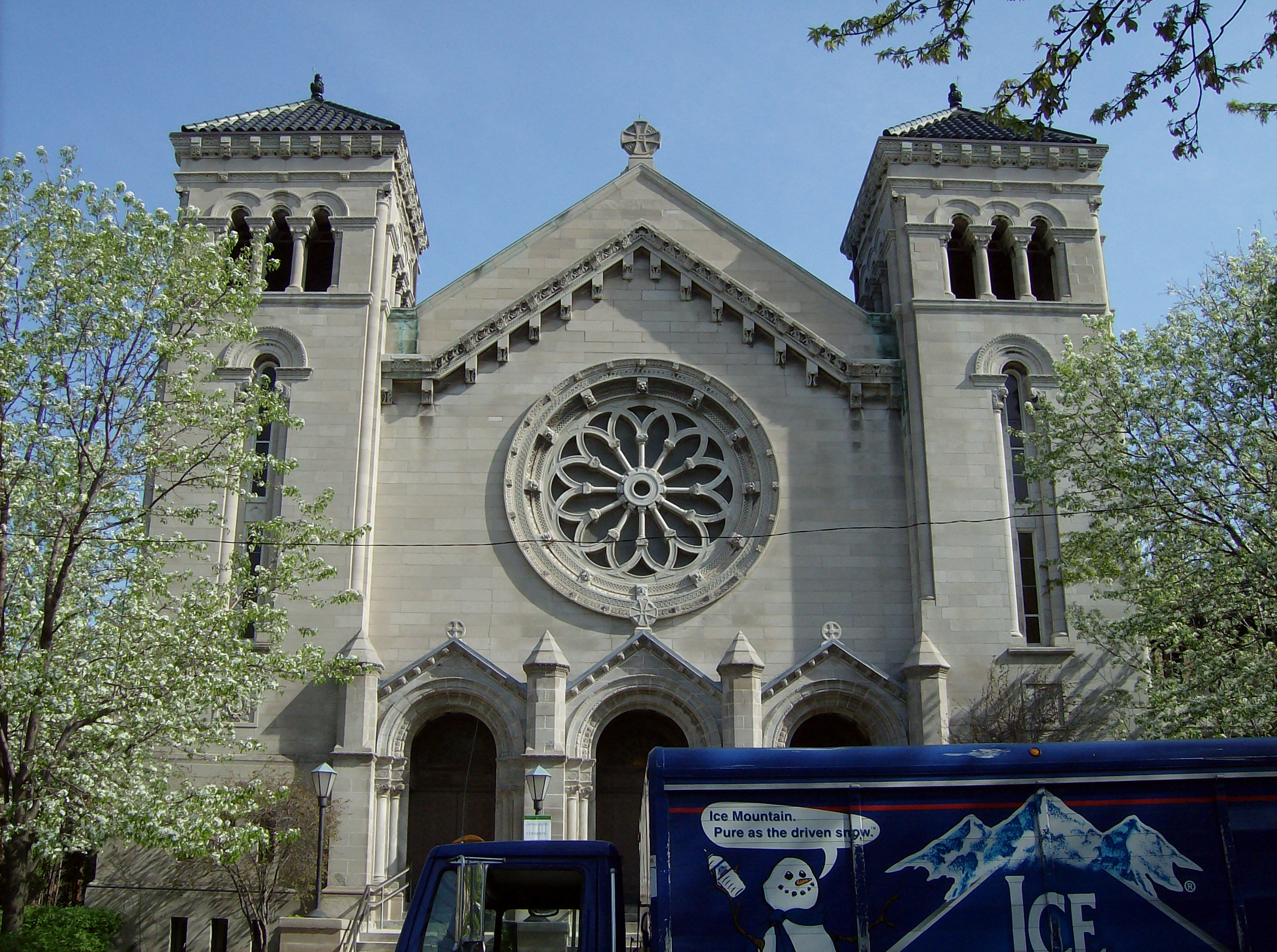
Saint Clement Catholic Church in Chicago, 1917

== Painting ==
Later in life, Barnett turned his attention primarily to painting. He studied under Paul Cornoyer, and followed the American Impressionism style. Barnett characteristically used wide brush strokes and vibrant colors. His works typically idealized his subjects, and were emotionally expressive and optimistic.

Barnett's paintings were well received in his lifetime. His works were exhibited at the Panama–Pacific International Exposition, the first exhibition of the Society of Independent Artists in New York, the Cincinnati Art Museum, the Art Institute of Chicago, the Pennsylvania Academy of the Fine Arts, and with regularity at the Saint Louis Art Museum. Barnett won both local and national awards including the Bronze Medal for Painting at the Lewis and Clark Centennial Exposition in 1905, and the First Ives Landscape Prize from the St. Louis Artist's Guild every year between 1914 and 1925.

In 1922, Barnett painted the 12' by 6' mural, Riches of the Mines, in the Missouri State Capitol in Jefferson City. The lunette representing a zinc mine in southwest Missouri was a favorite of art critics who marveled at Barnett's ability to depict drama and beauty in an otherwise bleak and desolate scene.

Barnett was a member of the Chicago Art Guild, National Arts Club, St. Louis Artist's Guild, Salmagundi Club, Chicago Galleries Association, Allied Artists of America, and the American Federation of Arts.

Works by Barnett are held in the permanent collections of the Art Institute of Chicago, the Detroit Institute of Arts, the Saint Louis Art Museum, the art collection of the Missouri State Capitol, the Missouri History Museum, the Museum of Art and Archaeology at the University of Missouri, and the Busch family collection housed at Grant's Farm.

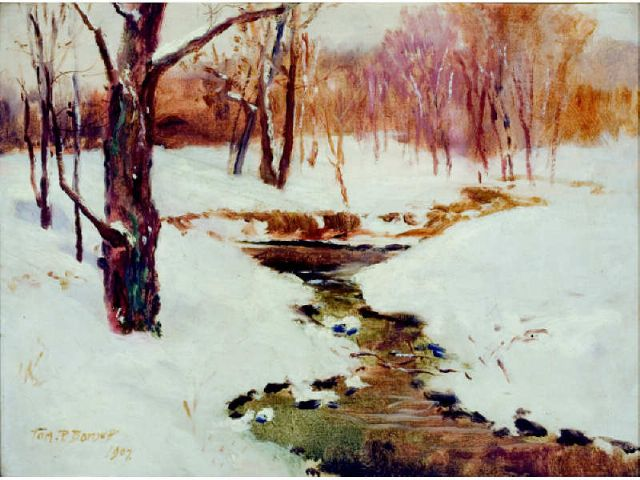
Winter River Landscape, 1907

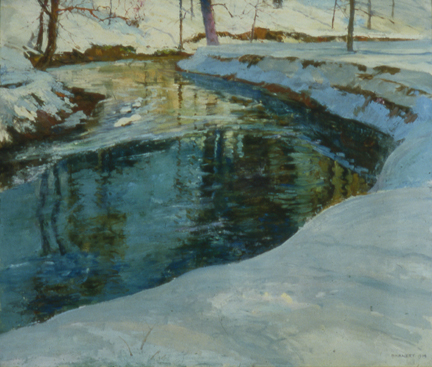
Close of a Winter Day, 1914, in the collection of the Saint Louis Art Museum

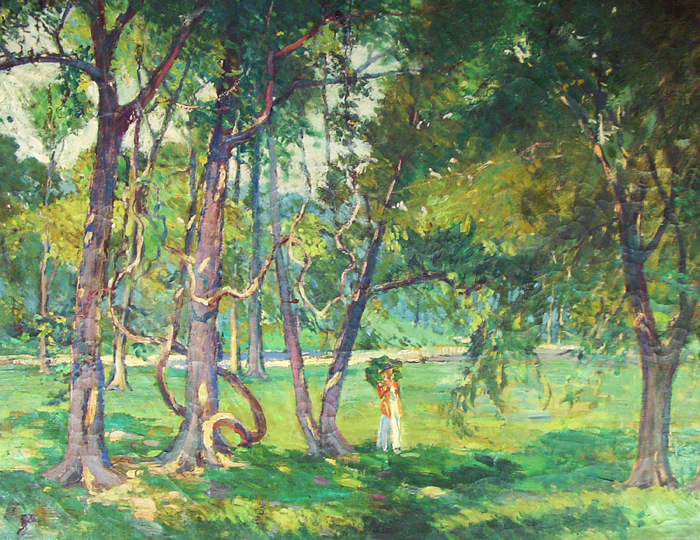
Forest Park Landscape, 1916

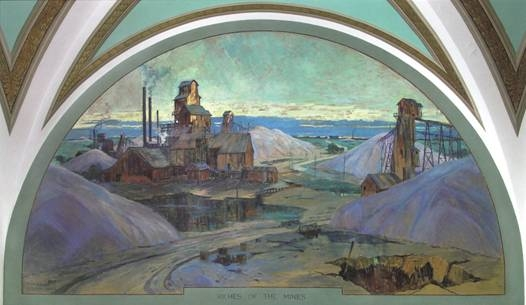
Riches of the Mines, 1922, mural in the Missouri State Capitol

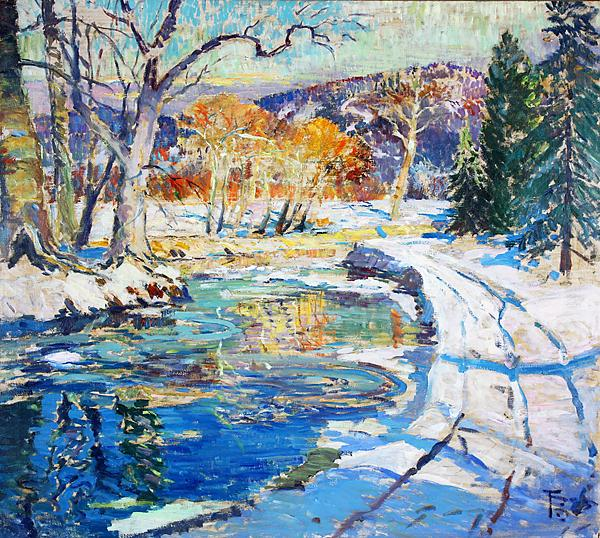
In the Heart of the Ozarks, 1925

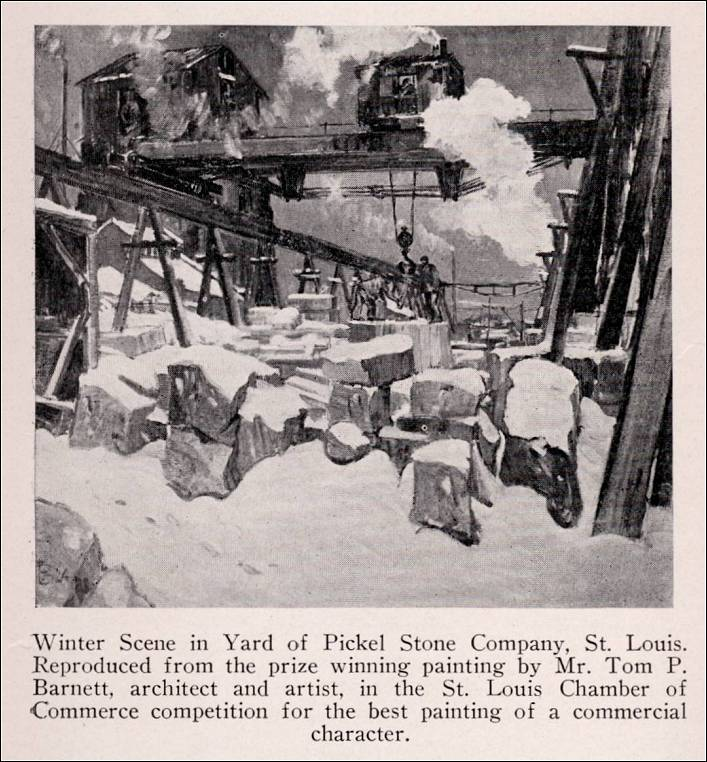
Pickle Stone Company, 1925

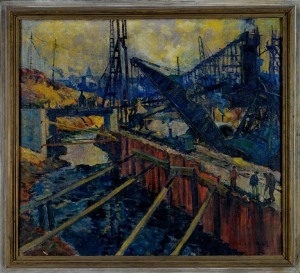
Construction of the River des Peres Channel in Forest Park, 1927

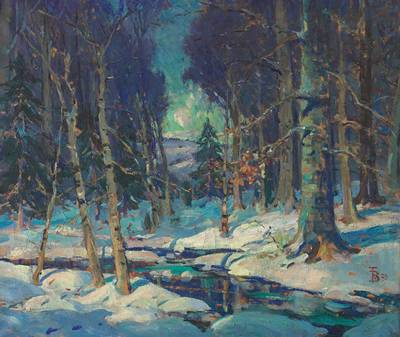
Mid Winter, 1929
