= James E. Strunck =

American lawyer, politician, and judge (1910-1988)

- Born: January 4, 1910; Chicago, Illinois, U.S.
- Died: May 8, 1988 (aged 78); Northwestern Memorial Hospital
- Occupations: lawyer politician judge

James Emmett Strunck (January 4, 1910 – May 8. 1988) was an American lawyer, politician, and judge.

Strunck was born in Chicago, Illinois. He went to the Chicago parochial schools. Strunck served in the United States Army Air Forces, as a pilot during World War II. and in the United States Air Force during the Korean War. He served in the Illinois Air National Guard and was commissioned a colonel. Strunck received his bachelor's degree from University of Illinois in 1948 and his law degree from Chicago-Kent College of Law in 1950. Strunck was admitted to the Illinois bar in 1950. Strunck served as an assistant general counsel for the City of Chicago from 1953 to 1970. Strunck served in the Illinois Senate from 1953 to 1963 and was a Democrat. Strunck served in the Illinois Constitutional Convention of 1969–1970. In 1971, Strunck served as an associate judge for Cook County, Illinois, in 1970, and as a circuit court judge for Cook County from 1971 until his retirement in 1984. He died at Northwestern Memorial Hospital in Chicago, Illinois after suffering from a long illness.
