= Ewell (name) =

Ewell is both a surname and a given name. Notable people with the name include:

Surname:

- Barney Ewell (1918–1996), American athlete
- Benjamin Stoddert Ewell (1810–1894), United States and Confederate army officer
- Dana Ewell (born 1971), convicted murderer
- Don Ewell (1916–1983), American jazz pianist
- Dwight Ewell (born 1968), American actor
- Julian Ewell (1915–2009), United States Army Lieutenant General
- Kayla Ewell (born 1985), American actress
- Marshall Davis Ewell (1844–1928), American lawyer
- Patricia Lynch Ewell (1926–2011), former U.S. ambassador to Madagascar
- Peter Rawlinson, Baron Rawlinson of Ewell (1919–2006), English politician
- Philip Ewell (active since 2001), American music theorist and cellist
- Richard S. Ewell (1817–1872), Confederate general
- Tom Ewell (1909–1994), American actor

Given name:

- Ewell Blackwell (1922–1996), Major League pitcher
- Ewell Ross McCright 1917–1990), U.S. Air Force captain
- James Ewell Brown Stuart (1833–1864), Confederate cavalry general

Fictional characters

- Robert E. Lee (Bob) Ewell and daughter Mayella, characters in Harper Lee's 1960 novel To Kill a Mockingbird
