= Chicago-Kent Journal of Intellectual Property =

- Discipline: Intellectual property
- Language: English

Publication details
- History: 1999-present
- Publisher: Chicago-Kent College of Law (United States)
- Frequency: Biannually
- Open access: Yes

Standard abbreviations
- Bluebook: Chi.-Kent J. Intell. Prop.
- ISO 4: Chic.-Kent J. Intellect. Prop.

Indexing
- ISSN: 1559-9493
- LCCN: 2006213528
- OCLC no.: 863031752

Links
- Journal homepage; Online archive

The Chicago-Kent Journal of Intellectual Property is a student-run law journal published at Chicago-Kent College of Law since 1999. It covers all aspects of intellectual property law, including patent law, trademark law, copyright law, and trade secrets. Journal issues are available on Westlaw, LexisNexis, and HeinOnline. The journal also has a blog presenting short summaries and updates on intellectual property law.

Notable authors include Chief Judge Diane Wood of the Court of Appeals for the Seventh Circuit, Judge M. Margaret McKeown of the Court of Appeals for the Ninth Circuit, Judge Timothy B. Dyk of the Court of Appeals for the Federal Circuit, David Kappos, the former USPTO Director, and Professor Rebecca Tushnet of Georgetown Law Center.
