= Carolyn H. Krause =

American politician

Member of the Illinois House of Representatives from the 66th district
- In office 1993–2009
- Preceded by: David Harris
- Succeeded by: Mark L. Walker

Personal details
- Born: October 20, 1938 (age 87) Milwaukee, Wisconsin, U.S.
- Party: Republican
- Spouse: David
- Profession: Attorney at law

Carolyn H. Krause (born October 20, 1938) was a Republican member of the Illinois House of Representatives, and represented the 66th district from 1993 to her retirement in 2009.

Krause graduated from University of Wisconsin–Madison and received her law degree from Chicago-Kent College of Law. She was previously mayor of Mount Prospect, Illinois from 1977 to 1989 and defeated David Harris in the 1992 Republican Primary. After she announced her retirement in 2008, Republican nominee and Elk Grove Village Trustee Christine Prochno and Democratic nominee Mark L. Walker faced off against each other. Walker won the election.
