= James T. Londrigan =

American politician (1925–2019)

Member of the Illinois House of Representatives
- In office 1968–1976
- Preceded by: Allan T. Lucas
- Succeeded by: John R. Keith

Personal details
- Born: February 23, 1925 Springfield, Illinois
- Died: May 31, 2019 (aged 94) Springfield, Illinois
- Party: Democratic
- Occupation: lawyer

James T. Londrigan (February 23, 1925 – May 31, 2019) was an American politician who served as a Democratic member of the Illinois House of Representatives and as a Justice of the Illinois Appellate Court.

== Biography ==
Londrigan was born in Springfield. He is an alumnus of the University of Illinois as well as the Chicago-Kent College of Law and practiced law at the firm Londrigan and Londrigan, in Springfield. He was married to Marilyn Brust and had five children.

Londrigan was appointed to the Illinois House of Representatives on August 1, 1968, to fil the vacancy created by the resignation of Allan T. Lucas. He served in the Illinois House of Representatives from 1969 to 1976. He served the 51st district from 1969 to 1971 and the 50th from 1972 to 1976.

In the 1976 general election, Londrigan defeated Republican candidate and former State Representative W. Joseph Gibbs to be elected Sangamon County Resident Judge after the retirement of William D. Conway. The 50th District Legislative Committee appointed John R. Keith of Taylor Springs to fill the vacancy created when Londrigan resigned to become a judge. He was appointed to serve as a justice for the fourth district of the Illinois Appellate Court for a term beginning June 1, 1981 and ending December 6, 1982 to fill the vacancy caused by the resignation of James C. Craven.

Jerry S. Rhodes succeeded Londrigan as a judge of the 7th Judicial Circuit.
