= Billy Dec =

American businessman

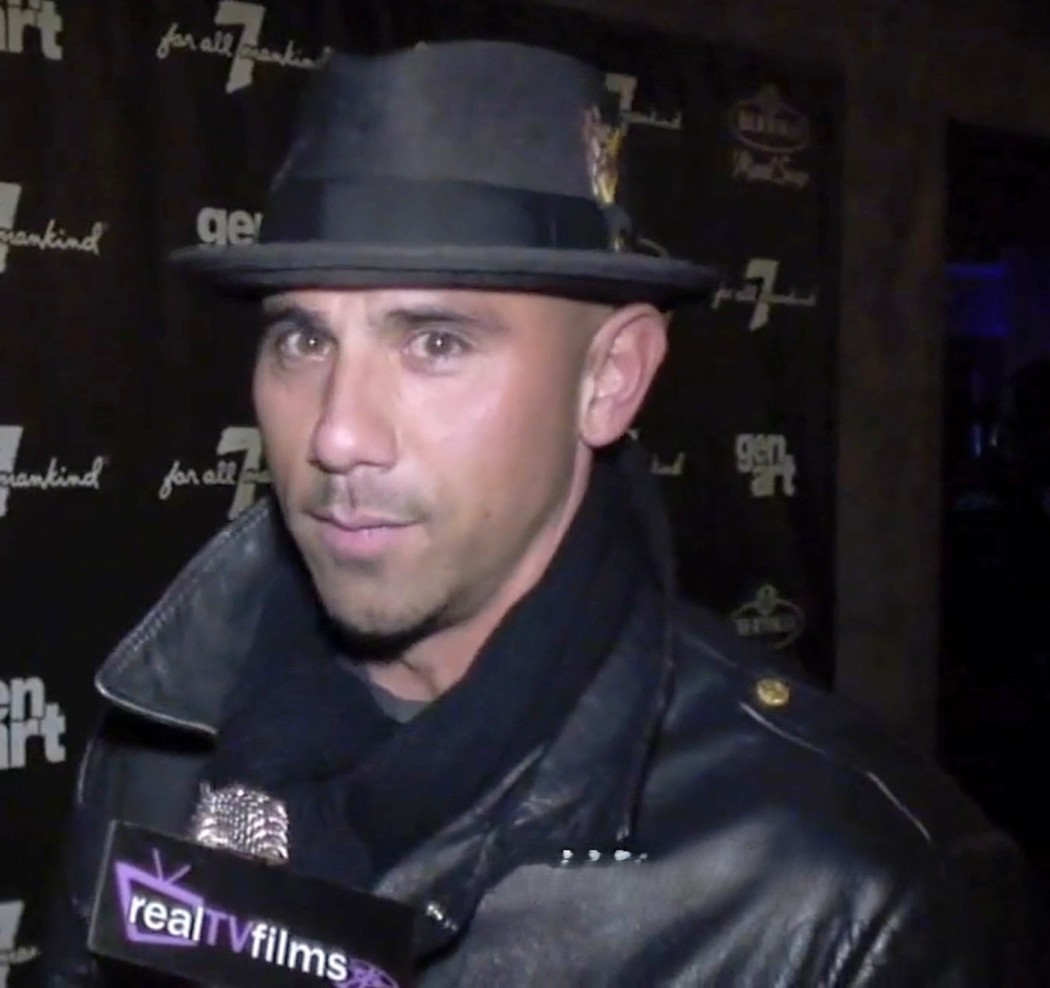
Dec in 2012

Billy Dec is a Filipino-American TV personality, background actor, and businessman in the hospitality industries. He is the CEO/Founder of hospitality management company Rockit Ranch, marketing agency COACT, and human resources firm HR Pro. He makes regular television appearances discussing food and entertainment, and his background acting experience includes Friends and Chicago Code. He also hosts a podcast, The Meal of Your Life!.

Dec has also served on the White House Advisory Commission on Asian Americans & Pacific Islanders, the White House Bullying Prevention Task Force, and was the director of cultural relations on the Chicago 2016 Olympic committee.

== Early life and education ==
Dec was born and raised in Chicago, Illinois, and educated at St. Clement School and the Latin School of Chicago. Upon graduation, Dec attended the University of Illinois at Urbana–Champaign, majoring in Economics/Pre-Law. During his time in college, he worked as a nightclub bouncer. After graduation, he was offered a job as a promoter, but turned it down to attend law school at Chicago Kent College of Law.

== Hospitality industry ==
During his first year of law school, Dec established his first club, Solo. While in law school, he went on to open Equinox Wine Bar, Dragon Room, Circus and The Bedroom.

In 2002, Dec and business partner Brad Young formed Rockit Ranch Productions, a restaurant and nightclub development and management company. Their first nightclub venture was Le Passage Nightclub, and their first restaurant was Rockit Bar and Grill, a restaurant themed around rock music. The company went on to open more venues including Rockit, Underground, Sunda, and Rockit Burger Bar. In 2019, Rockit Bar and Grill closed after 15 years.

== Entertainment industry ==
In 2015, Dec launched a Chicago-based production company, Elston Films, with his wife Kat Stephans and producers DeAnna Cooper and Kevin Cooper. The company has yet to produce a single movie.

Dec hosts a podcast entitled The Meal of Your Life, in which he interviews celebrity guests about a defining meal that has affected their lives. Past guests include David Schwimmer, Andrew Zimmern, Macy Gray, Carla Hall, Ming Tsai, Curtis Stone, and Rahm Emanuel.

== Charity work ==
Dec is a supporter of several non-profit organizations and charity events based in Chicago, including Make-A-Wish Illinois, Best Buddies, Asian Americans Advancing Justice, the American Cancer Society, the Lookingglass Theatre Company, and Maggie Daley's After School Matters. He was the director of cultural relations on the Chicago 2016 Olympic committee, responsible for attracting celebrity support for the city's Olympic bid.

== Personal life ==
Dec is the son of a Filipina mother, and a White father. In 2009, Dec married Katherine Stephans.

== Filmography ==
Dec has worked as an extra on many major productions and has used his connections to get small speaking roles as well.

=== Television guest appearances ===
- 2019: Today in Nashville, guest
- 2018: Today in Nashville, guest cohost
- 2007-2019: Today Show, food contributor
- 2016: Weekend Today, guest
- 2016: The Meredith Vieira Show, guest
- 2011-2016: Windy City LIVE, entertainment contributor
- 2014: Frankenfood, guest judge
- 2014: Good Morning America, food contributor
- 2014: Chicagoland, guest
- 2014: Fox & Friends, food contributor
- 2008: 24/7 Chicago, host

== Awards ==
Year	Award	Industry
2023	Chicago / Illinois Tech, Personal Achievement Award	Business
2019	Chicago / The Chicago Filipino Asian American Hall of Fame, Legend Award - (Won)	Business
2019	Champaign-Urbana / University of Illinois, College of Liberal Arts & Science Alumni Award - (Won)	Business
2017	Chicago / Chicago United, Business Leaders of Color - (Won)	Business
2015	Midwest Emmy Award - | Outstanding Achievement for Informational Programs – Single Magazine Program, Program Series, or Segment (Won)	Television
2010	Byrne Piven Community Service Award	Community Service
2010	Chicago-Kent College of Law Professional Achievement Award	Law
2010	Illinois Secretary of State's Asian Pacific American Business Leadership Award	Business
2010	Illinois Secretary of State Judy Baar Topinka Certificate of Appreciation for Excellence in Business	Business
2010	Filipino American TV Asian American Hall of Fame Award	Television
2010	Cook County Treasurer Maria Pappas' Asian Pacific American Entrepreneur Award	Business
2010	Cook County State Attorney's Asian Pacific American Community Leadership Award	Business
2009	Midwest Emmy Award - Outstanding Achievement for Entertainment Programs – Arts/Entertainment Program or Program Series (Broadcast/Advanced Media) (Won)	Television
2008	Nightclub & Bar Magazine's USA Operator of the Year (Won)	Nightlife and Hospitality
2008	Midwest Emmy Award - | Outstanding Achievement for Informational Programs – Single Magazine Program, Program Series, or Segment (Nominated)	Television
