= Anita K. Krug =

Dean of the Chicago-Kent College of Law
- Incumbent
- Assumed office 2019
- Preceded by: Harold J. Krent

Personal details
- Education: Kansas State University; Harvard University

Anita K. Krug is an American legal scholar and academic administrator who served as the dean and a professor of Law at Chicago-Kent College of Law from 2019 until May 31, 2025. She was previously the D. Wayne and Anne Gittinger Endowed Professor at the University of Washington School of Law from 2016 to 2019. Her work focuses on securities regulation, investment management, and corporate governance.

== Education ==
Krug graduated summa cum laude from Kansas State University with a B.A. in political science and economics in 1991. During her undergraduate studies, she spent her junior year at the University of Giessen in Germany. After completing her bachelor's degree, she was awarded a Fulbright Scholarship to study at the University of Cologne during the 1991 to 1992 academic year.

She went on to the Harvard Kenneth C. Griffin Graduate School of Arts and Sciences, where she earned a M.A. in political science in 1996 and a Ph.D. in political science in 2000. Her doctoral dissertation was titled Groups, Rights, and Liberalism: Historical Insights in a Contemporary Context. Krug concurrently attended Harvard Law School, earning a J.D., cum laude, in 1997. While there, she served as an articles editor for the Harvard Law Review.

== Career ==
Krug began her legal career as a clerk for judge Norman H. Stahl on the United States Court of Appeals for the First Circuit from 1997 to 1998. She then worked as an associate at the law firms Foley Hoag and Hale and Dorr in Boston while completing her dissertation. In 2002, she joined the San Francisco law firm Howard Rice Nemerovski Canady Falk & Rabkin, becoming a partner in 2007. Her legal practice focused on advising investment management firms.

Krug transitioned to academia in 2009 as a research fellow and lecturer at the UC Berkeley School of Law. In 2010, she joined the University of Washington School of Law as an assistant professor, later becoming a tenured associate professor in 2014 and a full professor in 2016. From 2014 to 2016, she served as associate dean for research and faculty development. She was appointed interim dean of the law school from 2017 to 2018. She was the D. Wayne and Anne Gittinger Endowed Professor from 2016 to 2019.

In August 2018, Krug became interim vice chancellor for academic affairs at the University of Washington Bothell, where she served as the chief academic officer.

In 2019, she was appointed dean and professor of law at Chicago-Kent College of Law, succeeding Harold J. Krent. She is the first woman to hold the position permanently in the school's history. Her responsibilities include overseeing the law school's administration, budget, and strategic initiatives, as well as promoting diversity and academic programming. She left the Deanship in May 2025 and is a Visiting Professor at Loyola University Chicago School of Law.

Her research and publications have focused on securities regulation, investment management, and corporate governance. She has published articles in journals such as the Columbia Law Review, Southern California Law Review, and Washington University Law Review.
