= Saint Clement Catholic Church, Chicago =

Church building in Chicago, Illinois, US

Coordinates: 41.9280°N 87.6460°W

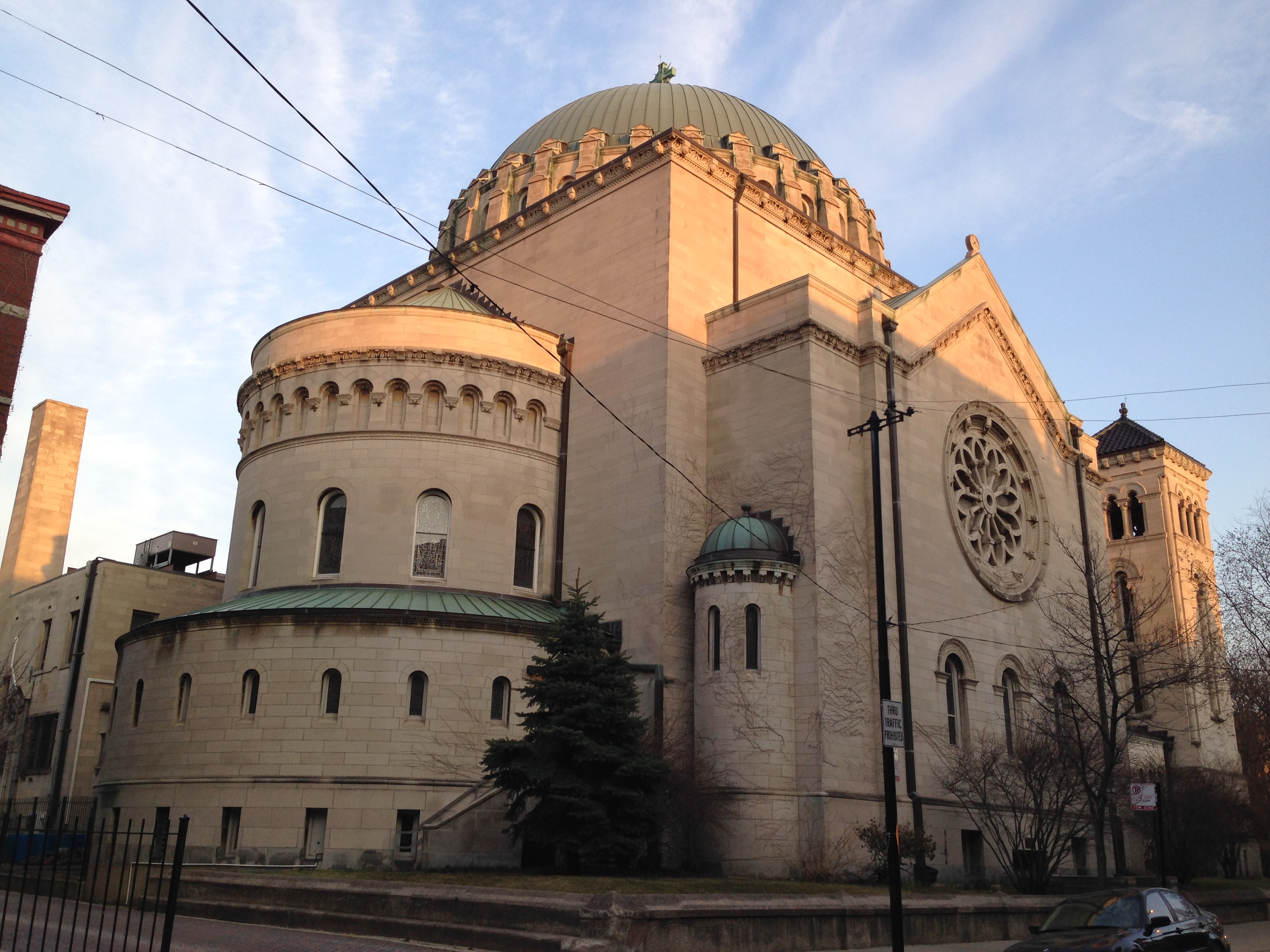
St.Clement Church in Lincoln Park, Chicago

St. Clement Catholic Church was built in 1917–1918 in Lincoln Park in Chicago. The architect was Thomas P. Barnett of the St. Louis firm of Barnett, Haynes & Barnett.

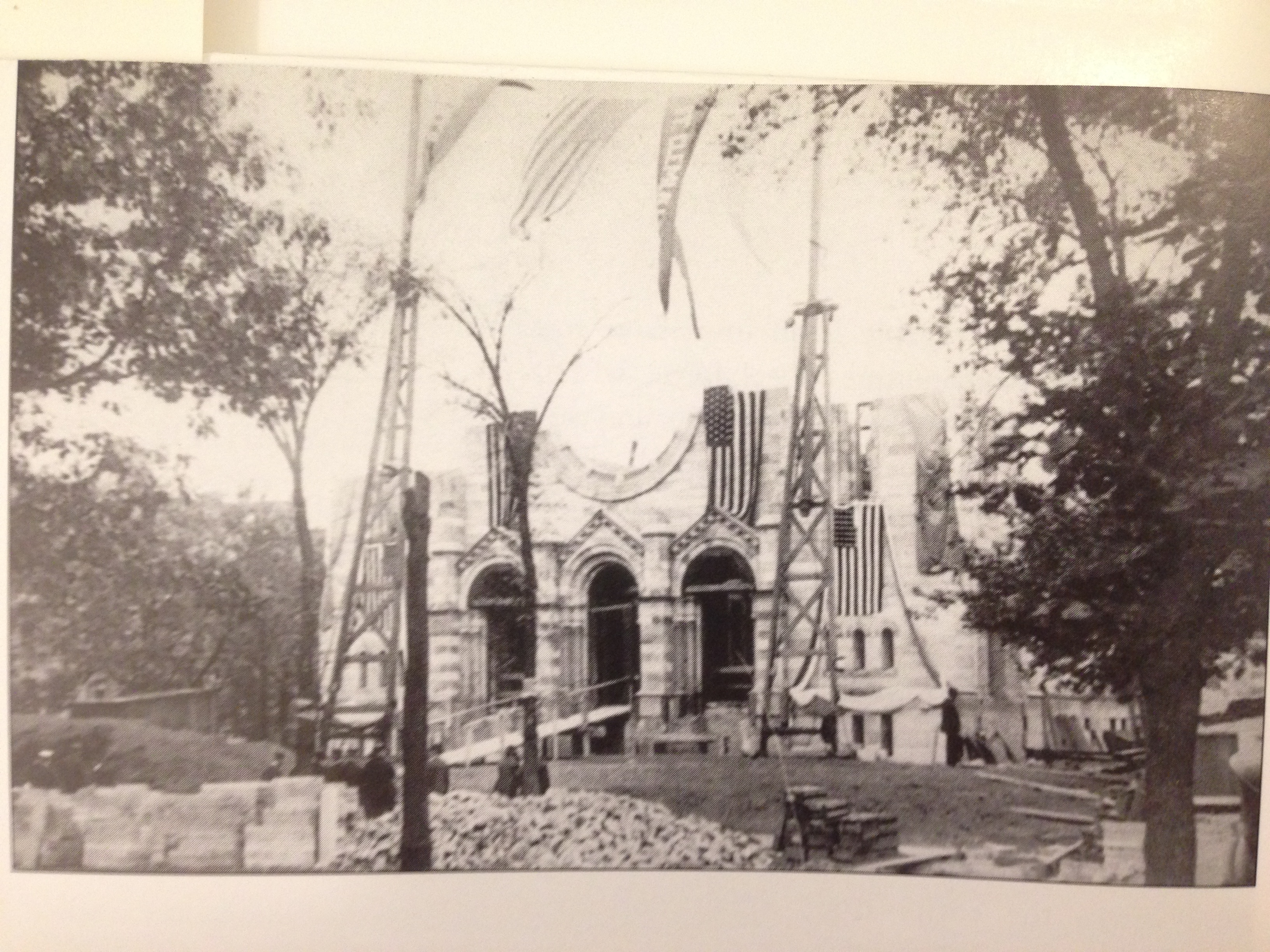
the church under construction in 1917–18, covered in American flags.

The church was built in a Byzantine style reminiscent of the Hagia Sophia in Istanbul. The decoration of the half-dome behind the high altar is a copy of the twelfth- or thirteenth-century mosaic in the apse of the Basilica of San Clemente al Laterano in Rome. The ground to begin building the church was broken on March 19, 1917.

== St. Clement School ==
The church is also affiliated with a school, for which ground was broken on October 18, 1905. The school used to be both a church and a school before the current church was built. Saint Clement School serves children in pre-kindergarten through 8th grade with a total of over 460 students.

=== Notable alumni ===
- John Mulaney, actor, comedian
- Billy Dec – Rockit Ranch Productions CEO and founder, actor

== Gallery ==
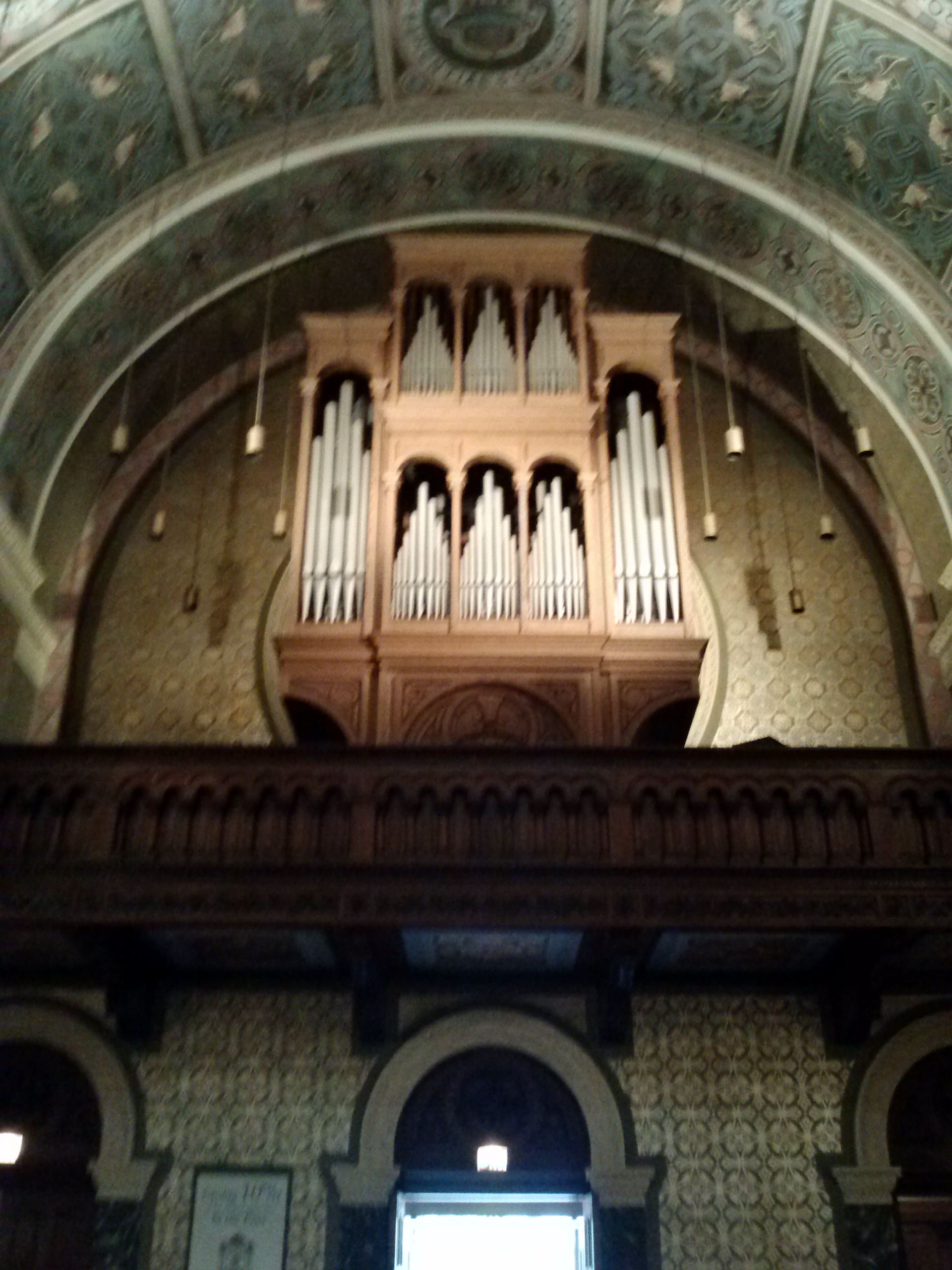
organ inside church

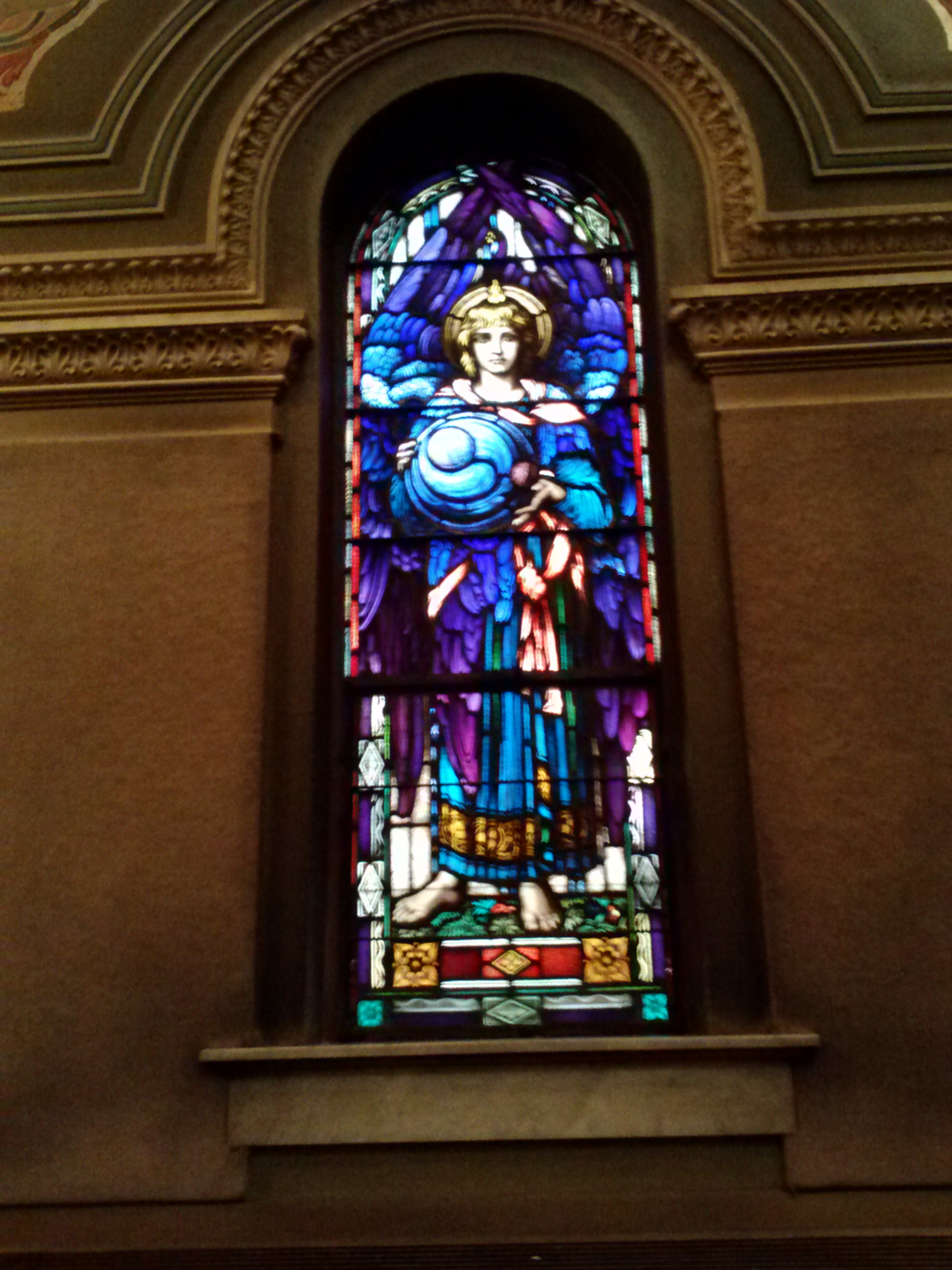

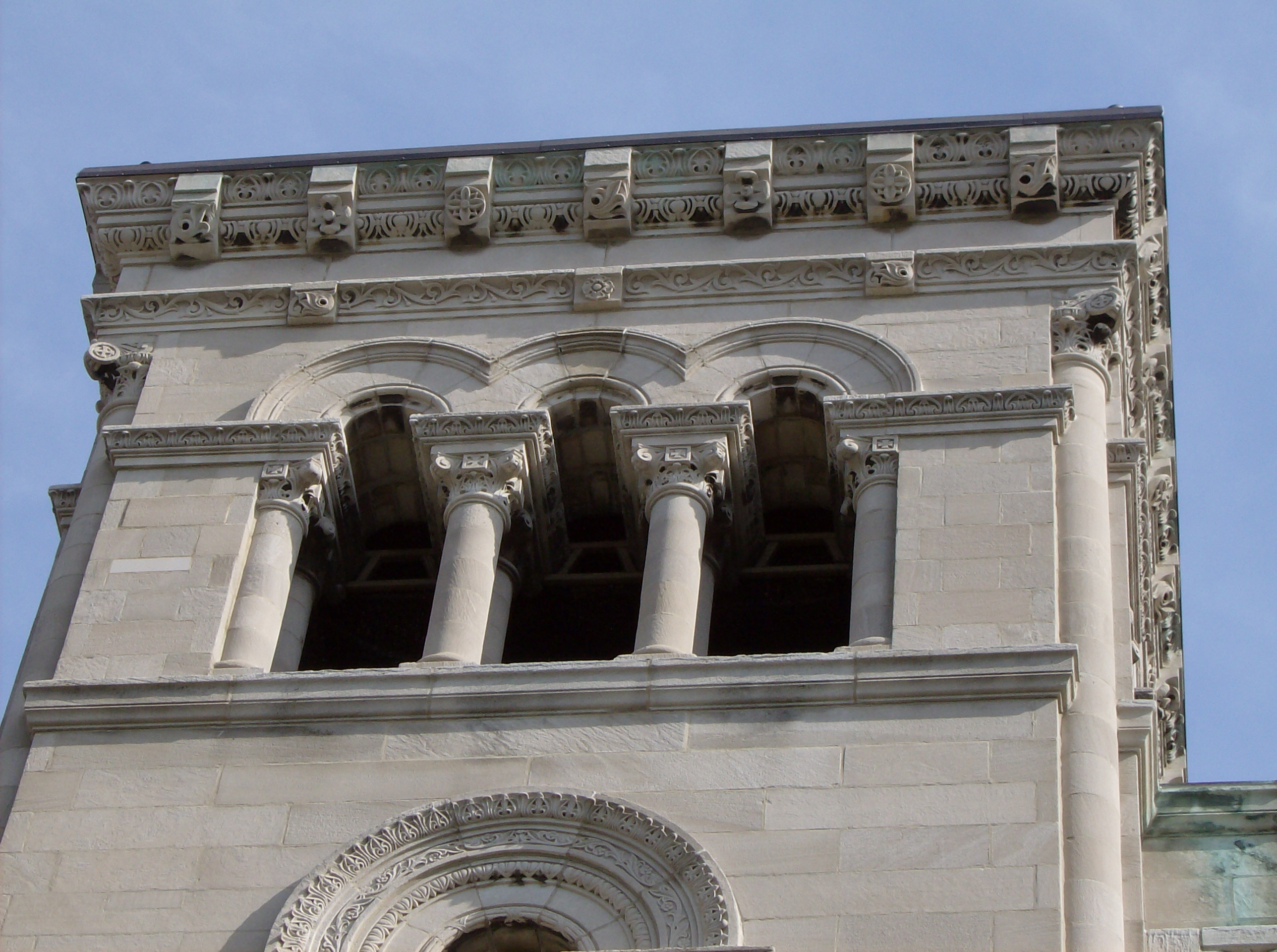

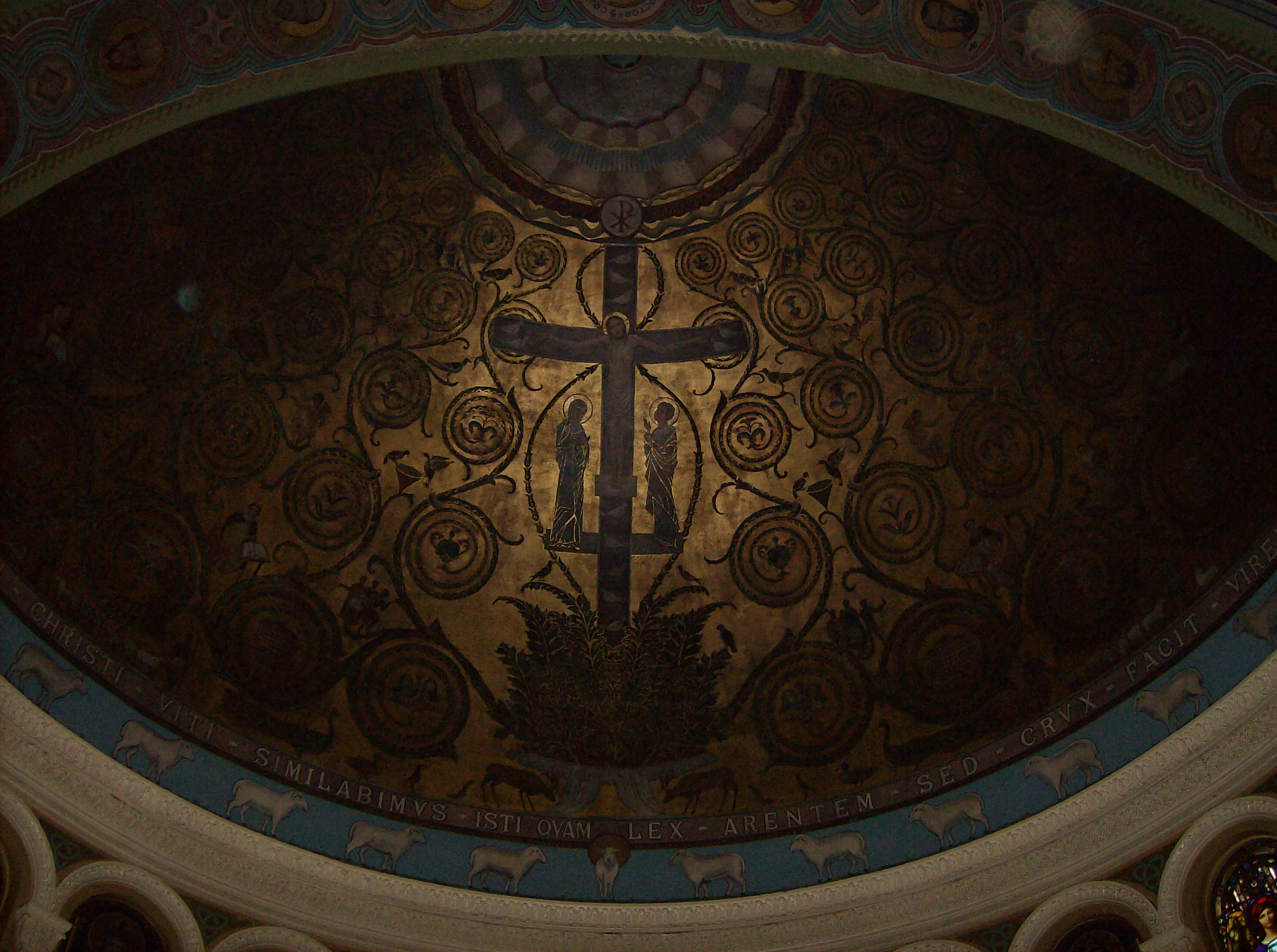

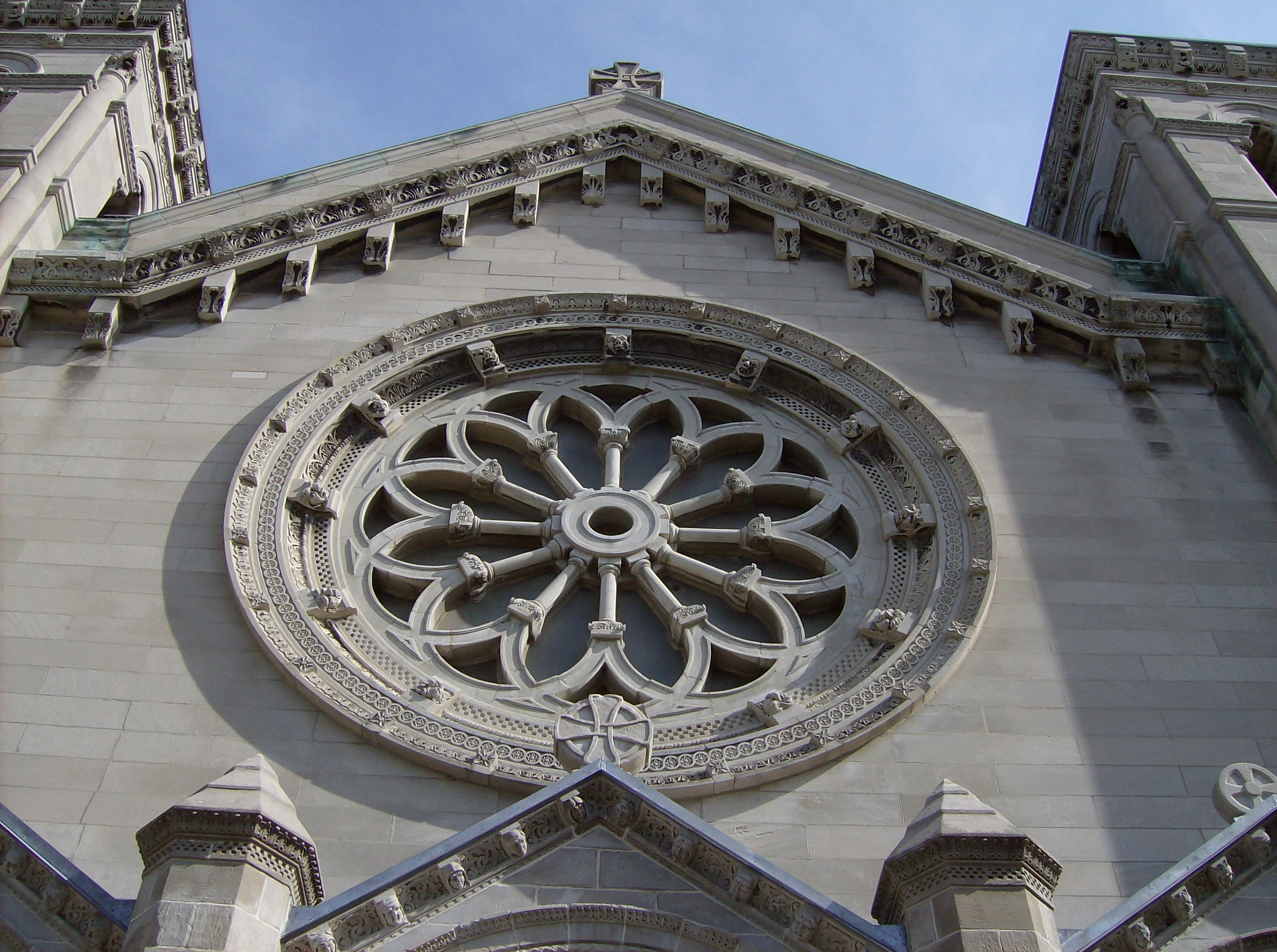

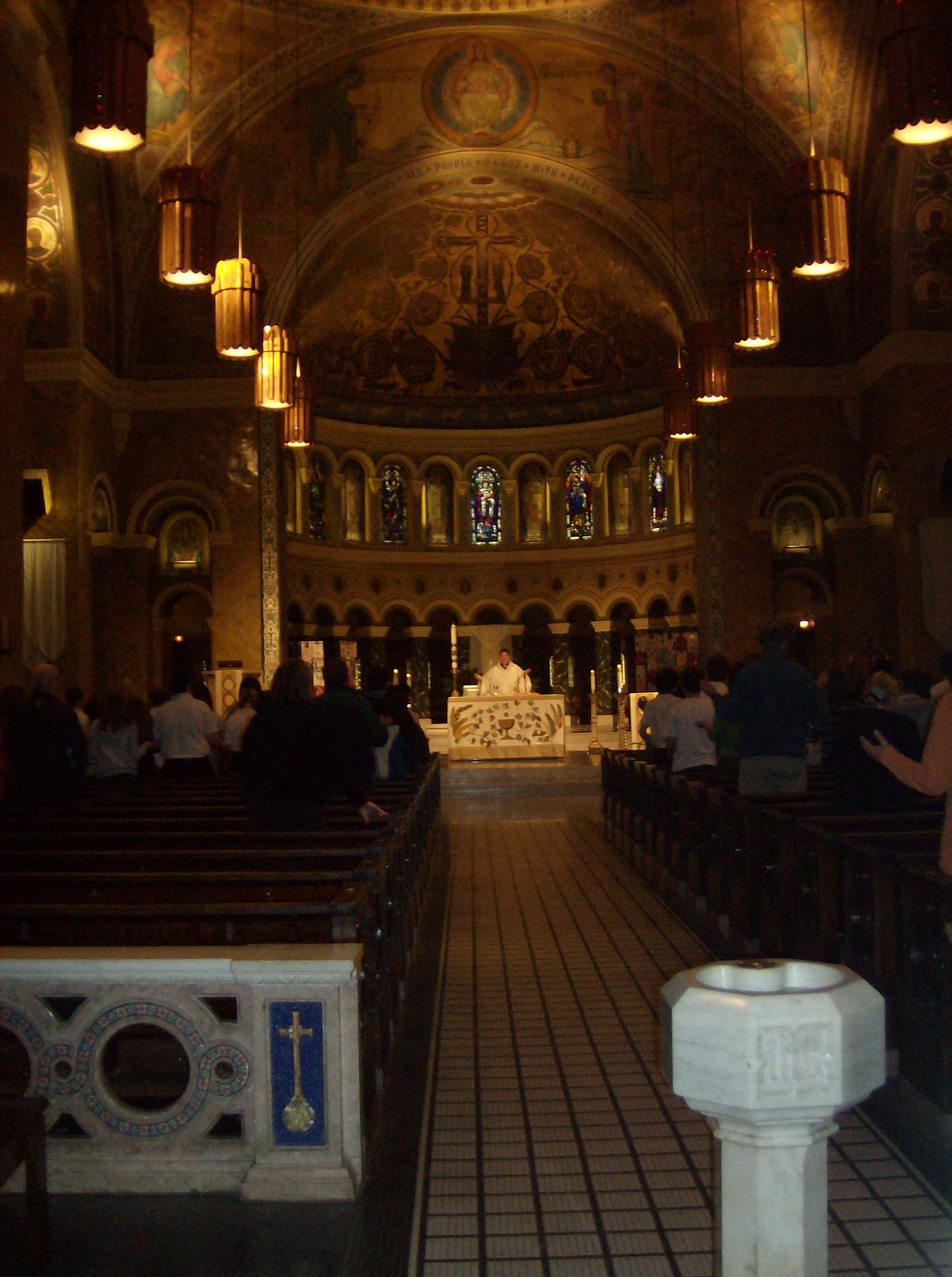

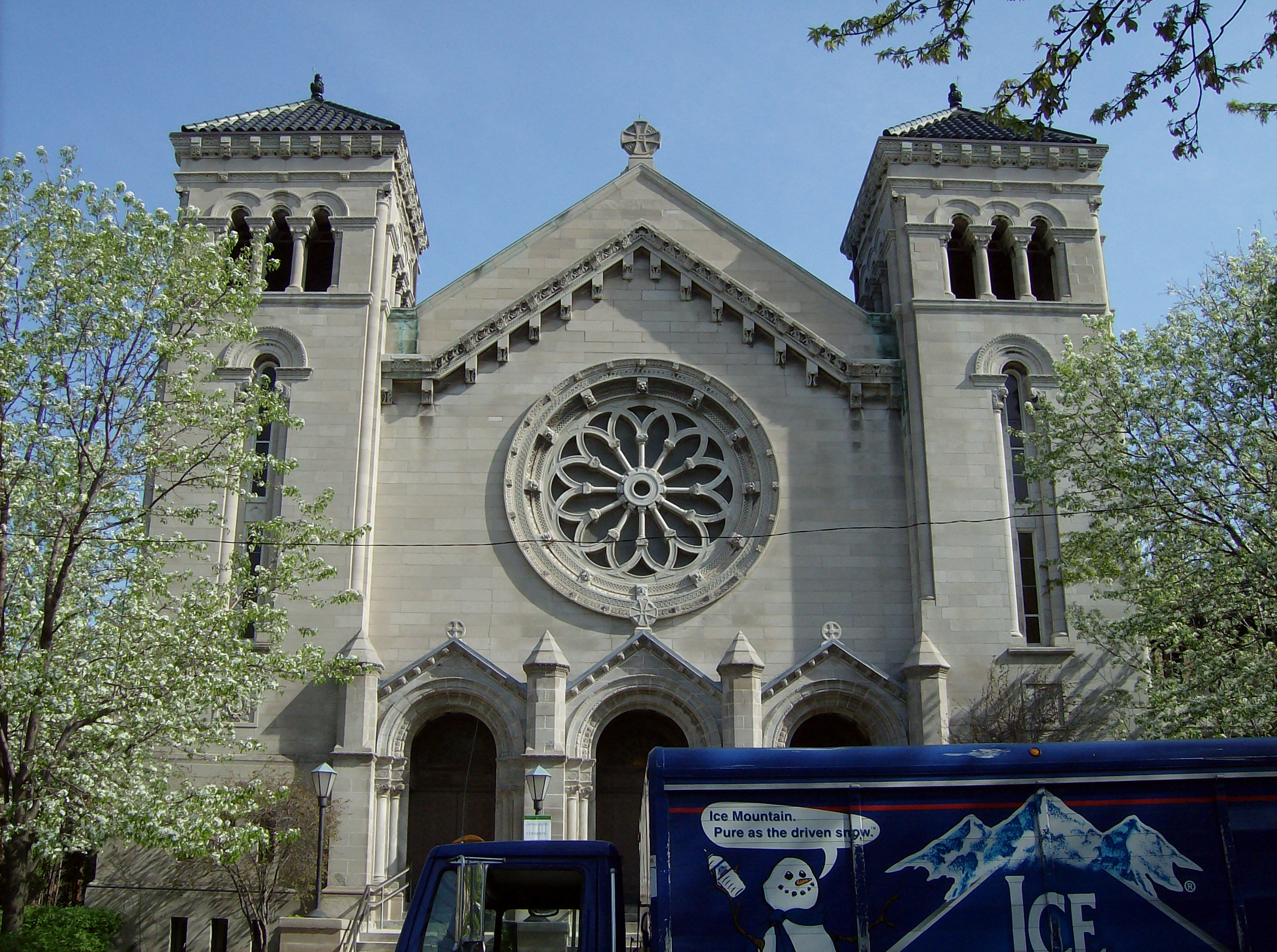
