= Samuel Ettelson =

American politician and lawyer (1874-1938)

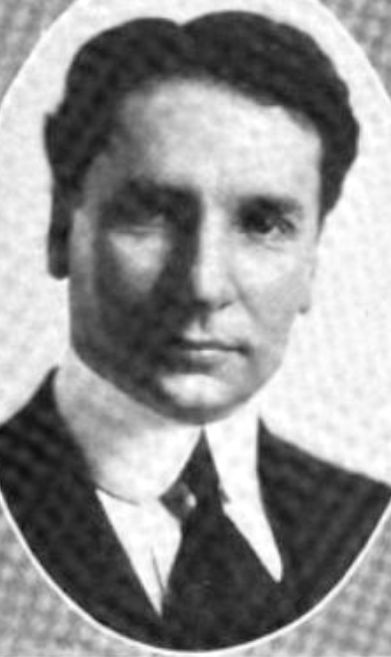

Member of the Illinois Senate
- In office 1906–1924

Personal details
- Born: Samuel Adams Ettelson; November 19, 1874 Chicago, Illinois
- Died: May 9, 1938 (aged 63) Chicago, Illinois
- Party: Republican
- Education: Harvard College; Lake Forest College; Chicago College of Law
- Occupation: Lawyer, politician

Samuel Adams Ettelson (November 19, 1874 – May 9, 1938) was an American lawyer and politician. He served in the Illinois Senate representing the 3rd District in Chicago from 1906 through 1918. He was a Republican.

== Biography ==
Born in Chicago, Illinois, Ettelson graduated from West Division High School. He attended Harvard College and Lake Forest College. Ettelson graduated from the Chicago College of Law in 1897. He was admitted to the Illinois bar and practiced law in Chicago. Ettelson served as corporation counsel for the city of Chicago. He served in the Illinois Senate from 1907 until 1923 and was a Republican. Ettelson died at Michael Reese Hospital from complications from surgery. He was Jewish.
