= Peter K. De Vuono =

American politician and lawyer

Peter K. De Vuono, Sr. (June 10, 1909 – January 18, 2004) was an American politician and lawyer.

De Vuono was born in Chicago, Illinois, and went to the Chicago public schools. He went to DePaul University, Chicago-Kent College of Law and was admitted to the Illinois bar in 1934. He served in the United States Army during World War II. De Vuono practiced law in Chicago. De Vuono served in the Illinois House of Representatives from 1953 to 1955 and was a Republican. De Vuono died at Northwest Community Healthcare in Arlington Heights, Illinois.
