= Ralph Brill =

American academic (1935–2019)

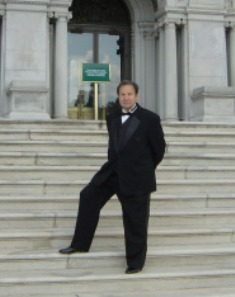
- Born: December 19, 1935; Chicago, Illinois, US
- Died: June 21, 2019 (aged 83)
- Occupation: Professor of Law

Ralph L. Brill (December 19, 1935 – June 21, 2019) was an American academic. He was Professor of Law at Chicago-Kent College of Law.

== Personal life ==
Brill was born in Chicago, the son of Romanian immigrants. He attended the University of Illinois, where he received both his undergraduate degree and his Juris Doctor. While in law school, Brill served as associate editor of the University of Illinois Law Forum. He was admitted to the Illinois Bar in 1960. Brill's first case as an attorney was a dog bite case.

== Establishing a legal writing course ==
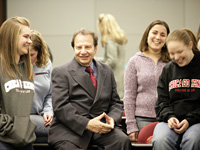

Brill began teaching law school in the fall of 1960 at the University of Michigan in Ann Arbor. He began his teaching career by teaching a subject outside the customary law school discipline — Legal Writing. Legal Writing was part of a course entitled "Problems and Research." It was at this time that Brill began to recognize the importance of including skills courses in the law school curriculum. Brill also became aware early on that "skills" teachers, such as those who taught legal writing, were treated differently from "substantive" (non-skills) teachers who were considered part of the regular faculty. According to institutional protocol, non-skills, or "theoretical," professors were compensated at a higher rate and given more political power than were their peers teaching nontheoretical and pragmatically oriented courses.

Following his year in Ann Arbor, in 1961, Brill returned to his hometown when he was offered a position at Chicago-Kent College of Law which, in 1969, merged with the Illinois Institute of Technology. He was associate dean from 1970 to 1973, and acting dean from 1973 to 1974. Brill taught Property, Agency, Legislation, Damages and several sections of legal writing. For much of his later career, he taught Torts and a Famous Trials in History seminar.

“I have gained the friendship of literally thousands of former students,” he wrote in 2011. “My reward has been to see former students, who may have struggled in the first year in my Torts or Legal Writing classes, excel as practicing lawyers, possibly using the knowledge and skills that I helped inculcate in them. It has been a great 50 years!”

== Legal writing program at Chicago-Kent ==
In 1977, Brill was asked by administrators at Chicago-Kent to set up a larger scale legal writing program. At that time, legal writing was still not considered an important discipline in legal study. Aside from a few programs, such as Marjorie Rombauer's program at the University of Washington, most legal writing departments consisted of one director and a staff of part-time instructors. Even when instructors were employed full-time, their contracts were most often limited to one or two years. These instructors were not considered "real" law school professors. In some instances, Legal Writing courses were staffed with individuals who were not legal professionals. Many legal educational institutions at the time maintained that skills teaching was the province of law firms, and that the discipline of legal writing was little more than a remedial grammar course not appropriate, even if necessary, in a graduate school setting.

Recognizing that skills instruction went beyond a course in remedial grammar, Brill proposed a three-year legal writing program which would be taught by legal professionals, and would be of a uniform quality for all students. Brill further proposed that class sizes be reduced so that students would receive more individualized instruction. The Chicago-Kent faculty adopted Brill's proposal and the legal writing program at Kent not only became the benchmark for all law school legal writing programs, but Chicago-Kent became known for the high level of legal training that its students received.

Brill remained director of Chicago-Kent's legal writing program for fourteen years. During that time period and afterward, he worked to improve the status of the legal writing professional. In 1985, Brill became one of the original Board members of the Legal Writing Institute (LWI), an association of legal writing professionals. Until the establishment of the LWI, legal writing professionals had few opportunities to exchange ideas or to compare experiences as to status at their schools. The LWI enabled them to band together in an attempt to enhance programs and status at their own schools.

While working toward national goals related to the profession of the legal writing professional, Brill continued to enhance the quality of his own program at Chicago-Kent. He helped to ensure that instructors in his own department, although not having the status of tenured faculty, were able to work without capped contracts. Moreover, Brill began, at the earliest stages of national computer use, to incorporate technology into his teaching by way of the use of listservs and visual presentations in class. In the early 1990s, Chicago-Kent became known for its use of technology in law school, and Brill was instrumental in establishing American Bar Association (ABA) accreditation standards related to distance learning in law schools.

Brill stepped down as director of Chicago-Kent's legal writing program in 1992, but remained on the faculty of Chicago-Kent teaching Torts and Tort-related subjects.

== Contributions within the field of Legal Writing ==
Although Brill is primarily associated with legal writing, his involvement in attempting to enhance legal education has been more expansive. Brill served as interim dean at Chicago-Kent on two separate occasions in the early 1970s, and taught Torts throughout his entire tenure as director of Chicago-Kent's legal writing program. He continues to work with the school's moot court team and sponsors the Brief award for the Chicago-Kent's intraschool moot court competition. He has been chair of the Association of American Law Schools (AALS) Section on Legal Writing, Research, and Reasoning and of the Individual Rights and Responsibilities Committee. Brill has been at the forefront of efforts to integrate computers into the law school classroom, and has spoken on issues related to replacing the traditional law school handwritten exam with an exam typed on a laptop.

Rocky Mountain Legal Writing Conference, March 2012

In addition to his work in legal education, Brill has been active in the Chicago Bar Association and was the chief draftsperson of rules requiring State of Illinois lawyers to be responsible for continuing their legal education for the remainder of their careers. Brill has also been a consultant on numerous tort cases.

Despite stepping down as Director of Legal Writing, Brill continued to remain involved in the development of the field. In 1994, Brill established a legal writing listserv in conjunction with the Legal Writing Institute Conference held at Chicago-Kent that year. The listserv was expanded subsequent to the conference and enabled legal writing professionals to communicate on a daily basis concerning the development of their programs. The listserv membership, which grew from a handful of individuals to over a thousand members within ten years, became instrumental in enhancing the solidarity of the professionals in the field and the overall quality of programs across the nation. Professor Brill was also an early leader and continues to be involved with the Association of Legal Writing Directors (ALWD), which was formed to advance the political objectives of the profession.

In 1995, Brill, along with Hofstra Legal Writing Professor Richard Neumann, worked toward lobbying the ABA to increase law school requirements for skills and writing instruction. The result was the ABA's adoption of increased requirements for writing during law school. In 1996, Brill, along with Susan Brody and Richard Neumann, argued that the ABA should change its standards regarding the protections and job security afforded Legal Writing professionals, and that adhering to these standards should be considered in determining whether a law school should be accredited. The result was the ABA's adoption of standard 405(d). Although this standard did not equate legal writing professionals to the status of tenured law school faculty, it did put legal writing professionals on more of an equal footing. Subsequent to the adoption of 405(d), many law schools determined that Legal Writing professors should be given even greater job protections and security than required by the standard.

In 1997, Brill along with Susan L. Brody, Christina L. Kunz, Richard K. Neumann Jr., and Marilyn R. Walter, collaborated on the Sourcebook on Legal Writing Programs. This book compiled information on existing programs of legal writing and gave recommendations for optimal programs. Recommendations included suggestions on class sizes and commentary on the need to improve the status and salary of legal writing professionals in order to enhance skills training in general. The Sourcebook became a standard for schools attempting to improve their own legal writing programs and put the American Bar Association on notice that the future of the quality of legal education necessitated taking notice that legal writing was integral to a quality legal education.

In recent years, both the ABA and law schools have begun to pay more attention to not only the status of the legal writing professional, but also to the quality of legal writing programs throughout the country. Currently, U.S. News & World Report assesses the quality of legal writing programs when doing its annual rankings of law schools. The rankings of legal writing programs are based in part, on the status and security afforded legal writing professionals.

== Recognition ==
Brill has received several awards for his commitment to legal education.

- In 1997, Brill was given the AALS Legal Writing, Research, and Reasoning Section Award for contributions to the profession of legal writing.
- In 2004, Brill received the Thomas F. Blackwell Memorial Award for his contributions to legal writing and legal education.
- In 2006, Brill received the Burton Foundation's "Legends of the Law" Award for "outstanding contribution to legal writing education".
- In 2007, Brill and Professor Molly Lien of The John Marshall Law School in Chicago were jointly awarded the first Legal Writing Institute Terri LeClercq Award for Courage—an award established to reward acts of courage in advancing causes related to legal writing.
- In 2009, Chicago-Kent established an endowed visiting professor position in his name, the Ralph L. Brill Distinguished Visitor, with plans to eventually establish an endowed chair (the school's first) in his name.
- In 2011, the Association of Legal Writing Directors (ALWD) created the Brill Award to honor him for his 50 years of teaching and contributions to the enhancement of Legal Writing programs. Brill was the first honoree.
- In 2011, Professor Adrian James Walters of England's Nottingham Trent University was named IIT Chicago-Kent College of Law's first Ralph Brill Endowed Chair.
