= Esther Dunshee Bower =

American lawyer (1879–1962)

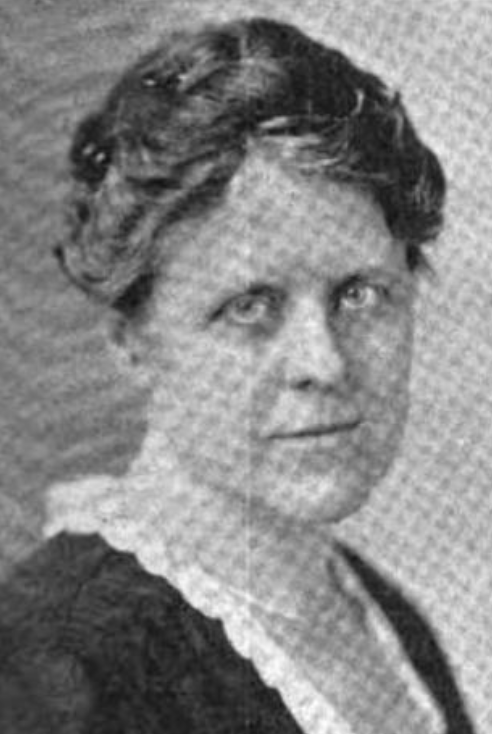
- Esther A. Dunshee, from a 1922 newsletter
- Born: Esther A. Dunshee; September 1879; Charles City, Iowa, U.S.
- Died: October 13, 1962 (aged 82); Conway, Arkansas, U.S.
- Education: Chicago-Kent College of Law
- Occupations: Lawyer, activist

Esther A. Dunshee Bower (September 1879 – October 13, 1962) was an American lawyer and activist based in Chicago. She was a co-founder of the Illinois League of Women Voters.

== Early life ==
Esther A. Dunshee was born in Charles City, Iowa, and raised in Wilmette, Illinois after 1887, the daughter of Edmond Philo Dunshee and Emerine Hamilton Hurd Dunshee. She graduated from Chicago-Kent College of Law in 1902.

== Career ==
Dunshee was a probate lawyer with the firm Good, Childs, Bobb, and Wescott. She was president of the Women's Bar Association of Illinois from 1920 to 1921. She was also the second woman elected to the Wilmette Village Board, and a trustee of the Congregational Church of Wilmette. During World War I, Dunshee went to France with the YMCA, and worked in a canteen in Le Mans.

Dunshee was active in the women's suffrage movement, and a co-founder of the Illinois League of Women Voters. For almost two decades, she and two other women lawyers, Kate Kane Rossi and Catherine Waugh McCulloch, were active in supporting the Women's Jury Bill in Illinois, which allowed women to serve on juries after it became a law in 1939. She also worked for laws protecting the economic rights of married women. and taught English classes for women at the Northwestern University Settlement. She served on national committees of the League of Women Voters, and presented on legal topics at national League events.

Dunshee published a state-by-state survey of women's rights in 1924.

== Personal life ==
Dunshee married businessman Lorin Alphonso Bower in 1933, after she retired. Lorin Bower died in 1956. Esther Dunshee Bower died in 1962, aged 83 years, in Conway, Arkansas.
