= John Dunshea =

Australian rules footballer

Personal information
- Full name: John Chalmers Dunshea
- Born: 11 October 1943 (age 83)
- Original team: Old Carey Grammarians
- Height: 185 cm (6 ft 1 in)
- Weight: 83 kg (183 lb)

Playing career^{1}
Years	Club	Games (Goals)
1964–67	Hawthorn	33 (17)
- ^{1} Playing statistics correct to the end of 1967.

John Dunshea (born 11 October 1943) is a former Australian rules footballer who played with Hawthorn in the Victorian Football League (VFL).
