= Marshall D. Ewell =

American lawyer

Marshall Davis Ewell
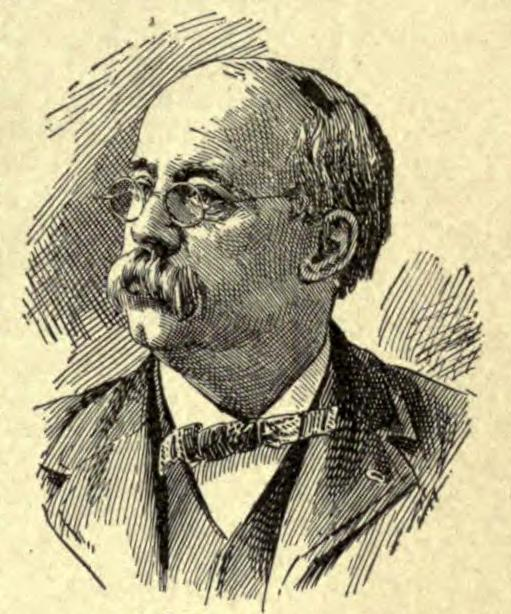
- Born: August 18, 1844; Oxford, Michigan, U.S.
- Died: October 4, 1928 (aged 84); Memphis, Tennessee, U.S.
- Education: University of Michigan Law School
- Occupation: Lawyer
- Spouse: Abbie Louise Walker (m. 1870)

Marshall Davis Ewell (August 18, 1844 – October 4, 1928) was an American lawyer, medical doctor, and microscopist.

== Biography ==
Ewell was born at Oxford, Michigan, on August 18, 1844. He graduated from the University of Michigan Law School in 1868. He founded Kent College of Law, which merged with Chicago College of Law in 1887 to become Chicago-Kent College of Law. In 1969, Chicago-Kent became part of Illinois Institute of Technology.

He married Abbie Louise Walker in 1870 and they had two daughters.

Ewell was elected to the American Philosophical Society in 1895.

He died at his home in Memphis, Tennessee, on October 4, 1928.

== Works ==
Ewell wrote numerous publications and he edited Blackwell on Tax Titles, Evans on Agency, and Lindley on Partnership. He was the author of:

- Leading Cases on Disabilities (1876)
- Treatise on the Law of Fixtures (1876; second edition, 1905)
- Essentials of the Law (1882; second edition, 1915)
- Manual of Medical Jurisprudence (1887; second edition, 1909)
- Essentials of Commercial Law, with Whigam and Skinner (1913)
