= Chicago-Kent College of Law =

Law school of the Illinois Institute of Technology

Coordinates: 41°52′43″N 87°38′32″W

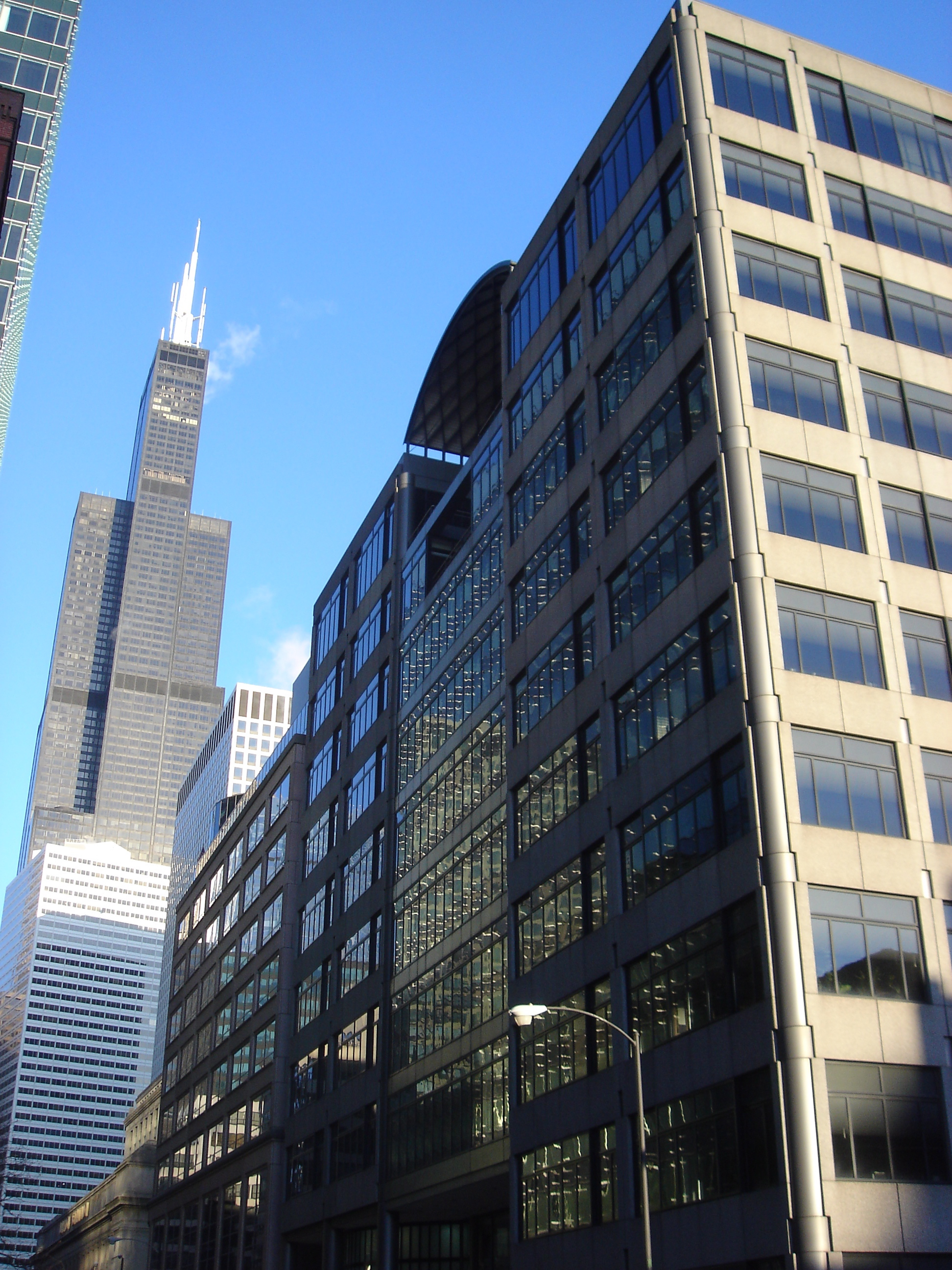
- Parent school: Illinois Institute of Technology
- Established: 1888
- School type: Private
- Dean: Jason J. Czarnezki
- Location: Chicago, Illinois, U.S.
- Enrollment: 764 (659 full-time, 105 part-time)
- Faculty: 74 full-time
- USNWR ranking: 107th (tie) (2025)
- Bar pass rate: 90.37%
- Website: kentlaw.iit.edu

The Chicago-Kent College of Law is the law school of the Illinois Institute of Technology, a private research university in Chicago, Illinois. It is the second oldest law school in the state of Illinois (after Northwestern Law).

Chicago-Kent was founded in 1888 by Justice Joseph M. Bailey. Today, it employs more than 140 faculty members and hosts more than 700 students in its Juris Doctor program, Master of Laws, and joint degree programs. The school is recognized for its three-year legal writing curriculum and offers J.D. concentrations in business law, criminal litigation, environmental and energy law, intellectual property, labor and employment, and privacy law.

== History ==
Chicago College of Law was founded in 1888 by Judge Thomas A. Moran and Judge Joseph Bailey. The classes started in the judges' chambers to prepare men and women for the newly instituted Illinois bar examination. A year later, in 1888, the Chicago College of Law was incorporated. In 1891, Emma Baumann became the first woman to graduate from the school. Ida Platt, in 1894, graduated with honors and also became the first black woman admitted to the Illinois bar. From 1889 to 1892 the Chicago College of Law was affiliated with Lake Forest University as its legal department.

During the same period, Marshall D. Ewell, formerly on the faculty of Union College of Law, founded Kent College of Law, which was named after Chancellor James Kent, author of Commentaries on American Law, a classic in early American legal scholarship. Within ten years, the Chicago College of Law and Kent College of Law merged to form Chicago-Kent College of Law. The law school's chief publication is the Chicago-Kent Law Review, which publishes one volume of three issues each year. The law review has received contributions from U.S. Supreme Court Justice John Paul Stevens, Circuit Judge Richard A. Posner, and author Michael Crichton. Students at Chicago-Kent publish five other legal journals on an annual basis, including the Chicago-Kent Journal of Intellectual Property and the Seventh Circuit Review.

The law school has a notable history of firsts, including the establishment of the first chapters of Lambda Epsilon, later Phi Alpha Delta, the world’s largest legal fraternity, and the creation of the Chicago-Kent Law Review, which began as the Athenaeum Law Bulletin in 1923, one of the nation's first law reviews.

Chicago-Kent moved several times during its history, including to the 116 North Michigan Avenue building in 1912 and the 10 North Franklin Street building in 1924, which served as its home for the next 50 years, prior to its final relocation at 565 West Adams Street in Chicago's West Loop neighborhood. In 1969, Chicago-Kent merged with the Illinois Institute of Technology to prepare students to face the challenges of a complex society.

The law school pioneered the three-year legal writing and research program in 1978 and established the first in-house, fee-generating law school clinic in 1976. The law school's trial advocacy program was established in 1971 and the Moot Court Honor Society in 1978. In 1984, it became the first law school to make the computer an integral part of the study of law. Many of the applications of technology now taken for granted in the law school classroom were pioneered at Chicago-Kent.

In 1989, Chicago-Kent established a chapter of the Order of the Coif, an honorary scholastic society that encourages excellence in legal education by fostering a spirit of careful study and recognizing students, lawyers, judges, and teachers for their outstanding legal scholarship.

In 2019, Anita K. Krug was appointed dean, becoming the first woman to hold the position permanently in the school's history.

== Rankings and honors ==
The 2023 edition of U.S. News & World Report ranked Chicago-Kent College of Law:

- 94th in the country overall
- 4th in the Chicago Metropolitan Area
- 5th in Illinois
- 7th in Trial Advocacy
- 12th in Intellectual Property Law
- 13th in the country overall for its part-time law school program

The law school's trial advocacy teams have a long tradition of excellence at both national and regional competitions, and have won the National Trial Competition, the premier trial advocacy competition in the United States, in 1988, 2007, 2008, and 2015.

Some of Chicago-Kent's past competition wins and accolades include being finalists in Syracuse Law's National Trial League, national quarterfinalists and regional champions in the National Trial Competition, and quarterfinalists in the Queens District Attorney's National Trial Competition. The law school's students have also been regional finalists in the American Association for Justice Student Trial Competition and quarterfinalists in the University of South Carolina Law's Trials and Tribulations National Trial Competition. In addition, Chicago-Kent's students have won the Best Advocate award in several competitions, including the South Texas Mock Trial Challenge and the All-Star Bracket Challenge.

In the 2020-2021 competition year, Chicago-Kent's trial advocacy teams were particularly successful, winning the Top Gun National Mock Trial Competition XII and being regional champions in the National Trial Competition. They also had semifinalists in the National Ethics Trial Competition and the Drexel Battle of the Experts, as well as quarterfinalists in the South Texas Mock Trial Challenge and the Stetson National Pre-Trial Competition.

== Degree programs ==
Chicago-Kent College of law, in conjunction with the Office of International Programs, and the Illinois Institute of Technology's Stuart School of Business, offer the following programs:

- Juris Doctor (J.D.) Program
  - J.D. Certificates and Concentrations:
    - Business Law
    - Intellectual Property Law
    - Legal Innovation and Technology
    - Public Interest Law
    - Criminal Litigation
    - International and Comparative Law
    - Litigation and Alternative Dispute Resolution
    - Environmental and Energy Law
    - Labor and Employment Law
    - Privacy Law
    - Workplace Litigation and Alternative Dispute Resolution
- Graduate LL.M. Programs
  - Global Business and Financial Law
  - Legal Innovation and Technology
  - International Intellectual Property Law
  - Trial Advocacy for International Students
  - U.S., International and Transnational Law
- Joint Degree Programs
  - J.D./LL.M. in Global Business and Financial Law
  - J.D./M.B.A.
  - J.D./M.S. in Finance
  - J.D./M.S. in Sustainability Analytics and Management
  - J.D./M.P.P.A.
  - Dual LL.M & M.B.A. degree program

== Institutes and centers ==
- Center for Access to Justice & Technology
- Center for Information, Society, and Policy
- Center for Open Government
- Global Law and Policy Initiative
- IIT Center for Diabetes Research and Policy
- Institute on Biotechnology and the Human Future
- Institute for Law and the Humanities
- Institute for Law and the Workplace
- Institute for Science, Law and Technology
- Jury Center
- The Center for Computer-Assisted Legal Instruction (CALI) and Oyez Project are headquartered at Chicago-Kent

== Notable alumni ==
- Robert Sengstacke Abbott, 1898, founder of the Chicago Defender
- Pablo Almaguer, former Chair of the State Bar of Texas Board of Directors
- Anita Alvarez, former Cook County State's Attorney
- Stanley C. Armstrong, 1911, former Illinois state representative
- Carson Block, 2005, investor, short-seller, and founder of Muddy Waters Research
- Esther Dunshee Bower, 1902, co-founder, Illinois League of Women Voters
- Anne M. Burke, 1983, Illinois Supreme Court Justice
- J. Herbert Burke, 1940, U.S. Representative from Florida, 1967-1979
- Frank J. Corr, acting mayor of Chicago, March 15, 1933 – April 8, 1933
- William L. Dawson (attended), U.S. Congressman
- Peter K. De Vuono, 1934, Illinois state representative and lawyer
- Billy Dec, nightlife entrepreneur
- Samuel Ettelson, 1897, Illinois state senator and attorney
- Harris W. Fawell, U.S. Congressman
- Robert J. Gorman, 1940, attorney
- Earnest A. Greene, state representative in 1936
- Oscar Raymond Holcomb, 1892, former Justice of the Washington Supreme Court
- Randy Hultgren, 1993, Republican U.S. Representative for Illinois' 14th Congressional District
- Charles P. Kindregan, Jr., legal author, professor, expert on modern family law
- Florence King, first female patent attorney in America
- Weymouth Kirkland, namesake partner of Kirkland & Ellis
- Carolyn H. Krause, Member of the Illinois House of Representatives
- James T. Londrigan, Justice of the Illinois Appellate Court from the 4th district
- Abraham Lincoln Marovitz, 1925, appointed to Federal Court for the Northern District of Illinois by President John F. Kennedy, 1963
- Richard B. Ogilvie, 1949, Illinois Governor, 1969–1973
- Maria Pappas, Cook County Treasurer
- Kwame Raoul, Illinois Attorney General
- Larry Rogers, Jr., commissioner on the Cook County Board of Review
- Peter Roskam, 1989, Republican U.S. Representative for Illinois' 6th Congressional District
- Ilana Kara Diamond Rovner, 1966, first woman appointed to the U.S. Court of Appeals for the Seventh Circuit, by President Bush, 1992
- Jim Ryan, 1971, former Illinois attorney general
- Kathy Salvi, 1984, partner at Salvi & Maher, Republican nominee for the United States Senate
- Bob Schillerstrom, DuPage County Board Chairman
- Flora Warren Seymour, 1916, Attorney, writer, historian, first woman on the Board of Indian Commissioners
- Nathan B. Spingold, vice-president of Columbia Pictures
- James E. Strunck, 1950, Illinois state senator and judge
- Chad Taylor, District Attorney for Shawnee County, KS
- Charles H. Thompson, 1918, Chief Justice, Illinois Supreme Court, 1945, 1945, 1949, 1950
- Jerry Vainisi, football executive and businessman
- Arthur Wilhelmi, 1993, Member of the Illinois Senate
- Bruce Wolf, sports journalist

== Notable faculty ==
- Ralph Brill, legal writing scholar
- Michael T. Cahill, Dean of Brooklyn Law School
- Sarah Harding, Dean of Schulich School of Law, Dalhousie University

== Employment ==
According to Chicago-Kent's official ABA-required disclosures, 89.9% of the Class of 2015 obtained employment nine months after graduation. Chicago-Kent's Law School Transparency under-employment score is 20.9%, indicating the percentage of the Class of 2013 unemployed, pursuing an additional degree, or working in a non-professional, short-term, or part-time job nine months after graduation.

== Costs ==
The total cost of attendance (indicating the cost of tuition, fees, and living expenses) at Chicago-Kent for the 2013–2014 academic year is $64,867. The Law School Transparency estimated debt-financed cost of attendance for three years is $239,727.

== Publications ==
- Chicago-Kent Law Review
- Chicago-Kent Journal of Environmental and Energy Law
- Employee Rights and Employment Policy Journal
- Illinois Public Employee Relations Report
- Chicago-Kent Journal of Intellectual Property
- Seventh Circuit Review
- The Journal of International and Comparative Law
- Satyam: The Chicago-Kent College of Law's Journal on South Asia and the Law
