= 2014 United States House of Representatives elections in Illinois =

- November 4, 2014

All 18 Illinois seats to the United States House of Representatives
| | Majority party | Minority party |
|---|---|---|
| Party | Democratic | Republican |
| Last election | 12 | 6 |
| Seats won | 10 | 8 |
| Seat change | ▼2 | ▲2 |
| Popular vote | 1,822,779 | 1,721,865 |
| Percentage | 51.42% | 48.58% |
| Swing | ▼5.63pp | ▲7.75pp |

Democratic hold
Republican hold Republican gain
Democratic
50–60%
60–70%
70–80%
80–90%
Republican
50–60%
60–70%
70–80%
80–90%

The 2014 United States House of Representatives elections in Illinois were held on Tuesday, November 4, 2014, to elect the 18 U.S. representatives from the state of Illinois, one from each of the state's 18 congressional districts. The elections coincided with the elections of other federal and state offices, including Governor of Illinois and United States Senate. The GOP gained two seats in this election, one in the 10th district with the election of Bob Dold in a rematch with incumbent Brad Schneider, and one in the 12th district with the election of Mike Bost over incumbent William Enyart. The gains narrowed the Democratic margin to 10–8 in the delegation.

== Statewide ==
=== By district ===
Results of the 2014 United States House of Representatives elections in Illinois by district:

| District | Democratic | | Republican | | Others | | Total | | Result |
| District | Votes | % | Votes | % | Votes | % | Votes | % | Result |
|---|---|---|---|---|---|---|---|---|---|
| District 1 | 162,268 | 73.09% | 59,749 | 26.91% | 0 | 0.00% | 222,017 | 100.0% | Democratic hold |
| District 2 | 160,337 | 78.06% | 43,799 | 21.44% | 130 | 0.06% | 204,266 | 100.0% | Democratic hold |
| District 3 | 116,764 | 64.56% | 64,091 | 35.44% | 0 | 0.00% | 180,855 | 100.0% | Democratic hold |
| District 4 | 79,666 | 78.15% | 22,278 | 21.85% | 0 | 0.00% | 101,944 | 100.0% | Democratic hold |
| District 5 | 116,364 | 63.24% | 56,350 | 30.62% | 11,305 | 6.14% | 184,019 | 100.0% | Democratic hold |
| District 6 | 78,465 | 32.86% | 160,287 | 67.14% | 0 | 0.00% | 238,752 | 100.0% | Republican hold |
| District 7 | 155,110 | 85.10% | 27,168 | 14.90% | 0 | 0.00% | 182,278 | 100.0% | Democratic hold |
| District 8 | 84,178 | 55.73% | 66,878 | 44.27% | 0 | 0.00% | 151,056 | 100.0% | Democratic hold |
| District 9 | 141,000 | 66.06% | 72,384 | 33.91% | 66 | 0.03% | 213,450 | 100.0% | Democratic hold |
| District 10 | 91,136 | 48.70% | 95,992 | 51.30% | 0 | 0.00% | 187,128 | 100.0% | Republican gain |
| District 11 | 93,436 | 53.46% | 81,335 | 46.54% | 1 | 0.00% | 174,772 | 100.0% | Democratic hold |
| District 12 | 87,860 | 41.89% | 110,038 | 52.46% | 11,840 | 5.65% | 209,738 | 100.0% | Republican gain |
| District 13 | 86,935 | 41.34% | 123,337 | 58.66% | 0 | 0.00% | 210,272 | 100.0% | Republican hold |
| District 14 | 76,861 | 34.59% | 145,369 | 65.41% | 0 | 0.00% | 222,230 | 100.0% | Republican hold |
| District 15 | 55,652 | 25.08% | 166,274 | 74.92% | 0 | 0.00% | 221,926 | 100.0% | Republican hold |
| District 16 | 63,810 | 29.38% | 153,388 | 70.62% | 0 | 0.00% | 217,198 | 100.0% | Republican hold |
| District 17 | 110,560 | 55.46% | 88,785 | 44.53% | 16 | 0.01% | 199,361 | 100.0% | Democratic hold |
| District 18 | 62,377 | 25.28% | 184,363 | 74.72% | 0 | 0.00% | 246,740 | 100.0% | Republican hold |
| Total | 1,822,779 | 51.09% | 1,721,865 | 48.26% | 23,358 | 0.65% | 3,568,002 | 100.0% | |

== District 1 ==
2014 Illinois's 1st congressional district election
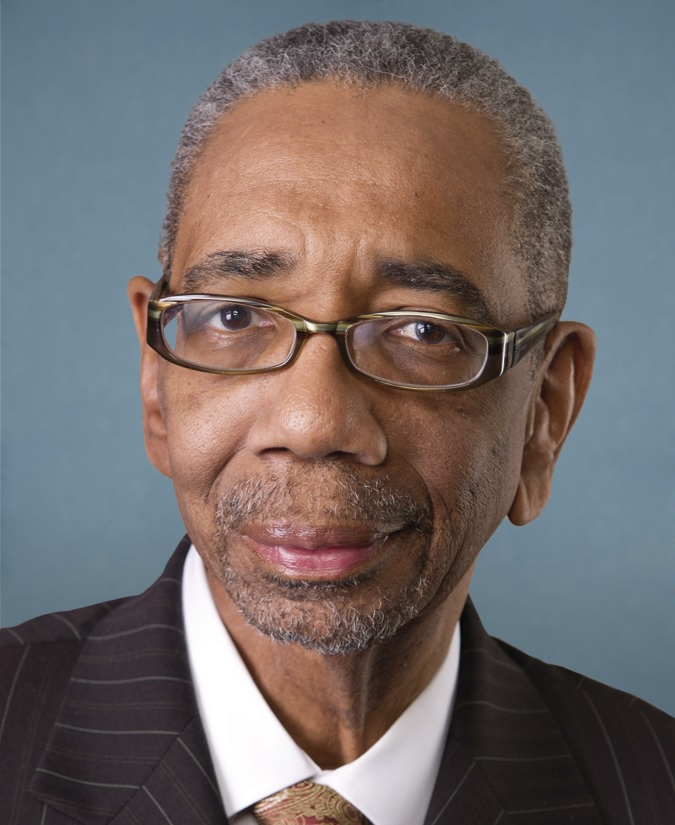

| Nominee | Bobby Rush | Jimmy Lee Tillman |
| Party | Democratic | Republican |
| Popular vote | 162,268 | 59,749 |
| Percentage | 73.1% | 26.9% |
- County results Rush: 80–90% Tillman: 70–80%
U.S. Representative before election
Bobby Rush
Democratic
Elected U.S. Representative
Bobby Rush
Democratic

The 1st district included a portion of Chicago as well as all or parts of the nearby suburbs of Alsip, Crestwood, Oak Forest, Tinley Park, Frankfort, Mokena and Elwood. Incumbent Democrat Bobby Rush, who had represented the district since 1993, ran for re-election. He was re-elected with 74% of the vote in 2012 and the district had a PVI of D+28.

=== Democratic primary ===
==== Candidates ====
===== Nominee =====
- Bobby Rush, incumbent U.S. Representative

==== Results ====
Democratic primary results
| Party | Candidate | Votes | % |
|---|---|---|---|
| Democratic | Bobby Rush (incumbent) | 47,627 | 100.0 |

=== Republican primary ===
==== Candidates ====
===== Nominee =====
- Jimmy Lee Tillman III, son of former Chicago Alderman Dorothy Tillman

==== Results ====
Republican primary results
| Party | Candidate | Votes | % |
|---|---|---|---|
| Republican | Jimmy Lee Tillman III | 17,188 | 100.0 |

=== General election ===
==== Predictions ====
| Source | Ranking | As of |
|---|---|---|
| The Cook Political Report | Safe D | November 3, 2014 |
| Rothenberg | Safe D | October 24, 2014 |
| Sabato's Crystal Ball | Safe D | October 30, 2014 |
| RCP | Safe D | November 2, 2014 |
| Daily Kos Elections | Safe D | November 4, 2014 |

==== Results ====
Rush was re-elected by 46 points. His victory was expected, as the district is solidly Democratic.

Illinois's 1st congressional district, 2014
| Party | Candidate | Votes | % |
|---|---|---|---|
| Democratic | Bobby Rush (incumbent) | 162,268 | 73.1 |
| Republican | Jimmy Lee Tillman | 59,749 | 26.9 |
| Total votes | | 222,017 | 100.0 |
| Democratic hold | | | |

== District 2 ==
2014 Illinois's 2nd congressional district election
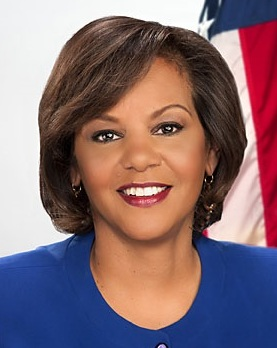

| Nominee | Robin Kelly | Eric Wallace |
| Party | Democratic | Republican |
| Popular vote | 160,337 | 43,799 |
| Percentage | 78.3% | 21.4% |
- County results Kelly: 50–60% 80–90% Wallace: 50–60%
U.S. Representative before election
Robin Kelly
Democratic
Elected U.S. Representative
Robin Kelly
Democratic

Incumbent Democrat Robin Kelly, who had represented the district after being elected with 71% of the vote in a special election in April 2013, ran for re-election. The district had a PVI of D+29.

=== Democratic primary ===
==== Candidates ====
===== Nominee =====
- Robin Kelly, incumbent U.S. Representative

===== Disqualified =====
- Marcus Lewis, postal worker and Independent candidate for this seat in 2012 and in 2013
- Charles Rayburn, candidate for this seat in 2013

==== Results ====
Democratic primary results
| Party | Candidate | Votes | % |
|---|---|---|---|
| Democratic | Robin Kelly (incumbent) | 40,286 | 100.0 |

=== Republican primary ===
==== Candidates ====
===== Nominee =====
- Eric Wallace, candidate for this seat in 2013

==== Results ====
Republican primary results
| Party | Candidate | Votes | % |
|---|---|---|---|
| Republican | Eric Wallace | 16,096 | 100.0 |

=== General election ===
==== Endorsements ====
Robin Kelly (D)

Newspapers

- Chicago Tribune

==== Predictions ====
| Source | Ranking | As of |
|---|---|---|
| The Cook Political Report | Safe D | November 3, 2014 |
| Rothenberg | Safe D | October 24, 2014 |
| Sabato's Crystal Ball | Safe D | October 30, 2014 |
| RCP | Safe D | November 2, 2014 |
| Daily Kos Elections | Safe D | November 4, 2014 |

==== Results ====
Kelly was re-elected by 57 points.

Illinois's 2nd congressional district, 2014
| Party | Candidate | Votes | % |
|---|---|---|---|
| Democratic | Robin Kelly (incumbent) | 160,337 | 78.5 |
| Republican | Eric Wallace | 43,799 | 21.4 |
| Independent | Marcus Lewis (write-in) | 130 | 0.1 |
| Total votes | | 204,266 | 100.0 |
| Democratic hold | | | |

== District 3 ==
2014 Illinois's 3rd congressional district election
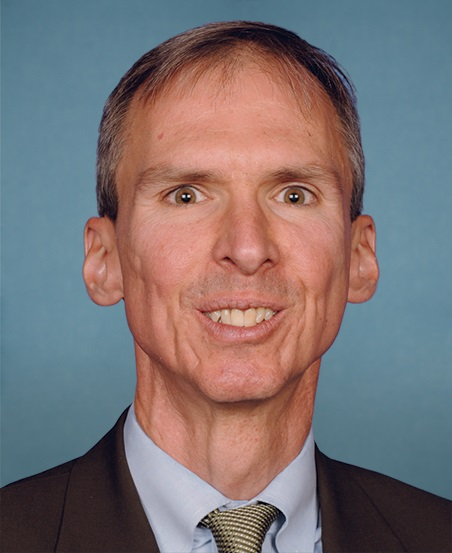

| Nominee | Dan Lipinski | Sharon Brannigan |
| Party | Democratic | Republican |
| Popular vote | 116,764 | 64,091 |
| Percentage | 64.6% | 35.4% |
- County results Lipinski: 50–60% 60–70%
U.S. Representative before election
Dan Lipinski
Democratic
Elected U.S. Representative
Dan Lipinski
Democratic

Incumbent Democrat Dan Lipinski, who had represented the district since 2005, ran for re-election. He was re-elected with 69% of the vote in 2012 and the district has a PVI of D+5.

=== Democratic primary ===
==== Candidates ====
===== Nominee =====
- Dan Lipinski, incumbent U.S. Representative

==== Results ====
Democratic primary results
| Party | Candidate | Votes | % |
|---|---|---|---|
| Democratic | Dan Lipinski (incumbent) | 28,883 | 100.0 |

=== Republican primary ===
==== Candidates ====
===== Nominee =====
- Sharon Brannigan, Palos Township trustee

===== Eliminated in primary =====
- Diane Harris, notary public, Will County Republican precinct committee person and candidate for 11th district

==== Results ====
Brannigan won the primary and became the Republican nominee.

Republican primary results
| Party | Candidate | Votes | % |
|---|---|---|---|
| Republican | Sharon Brannigan | 18,358 | 62.7 |
| Republican | Diane Harris | 10,937 | 37.3 |
| Total votes | | 29,295 | 100.0 |

=== General election ===
==== Endorsements ====
Dan Lipinski (D)

Newspapers

- Chicago Tribune

==== Predictions ====
| Source | Ranking | As of |
|---|---|---|
| The Cook Political Report | Safe D | November 3, 2014 |
| Rothenberg | Safe D | October 24, 2014 |
| Sabato's Crystal Ball | Safe D | October 30, 2014 |
| RCP | Safe D | November 2, 2014 |
| Daily Kos Elections | Safe D | November 4, 2014 |

==== Results ====
Lipinski was re-elected in a 29-point landslide.

Illinois's 3rd congressional district, 2014
| Party | Candidate | Votes | % |
|---|---|---|---|
| Democratic | Dan Lipinski (incumbent) | 116,764 | 64.6 |
| Republican | Sharon Brannigan | 64,091 | 35.4 |
| Total votes | | 180,855 | 100.0 |
| Democratic hold | | | |

== District 4 ==
2014 Illinois's 4th congressional district election
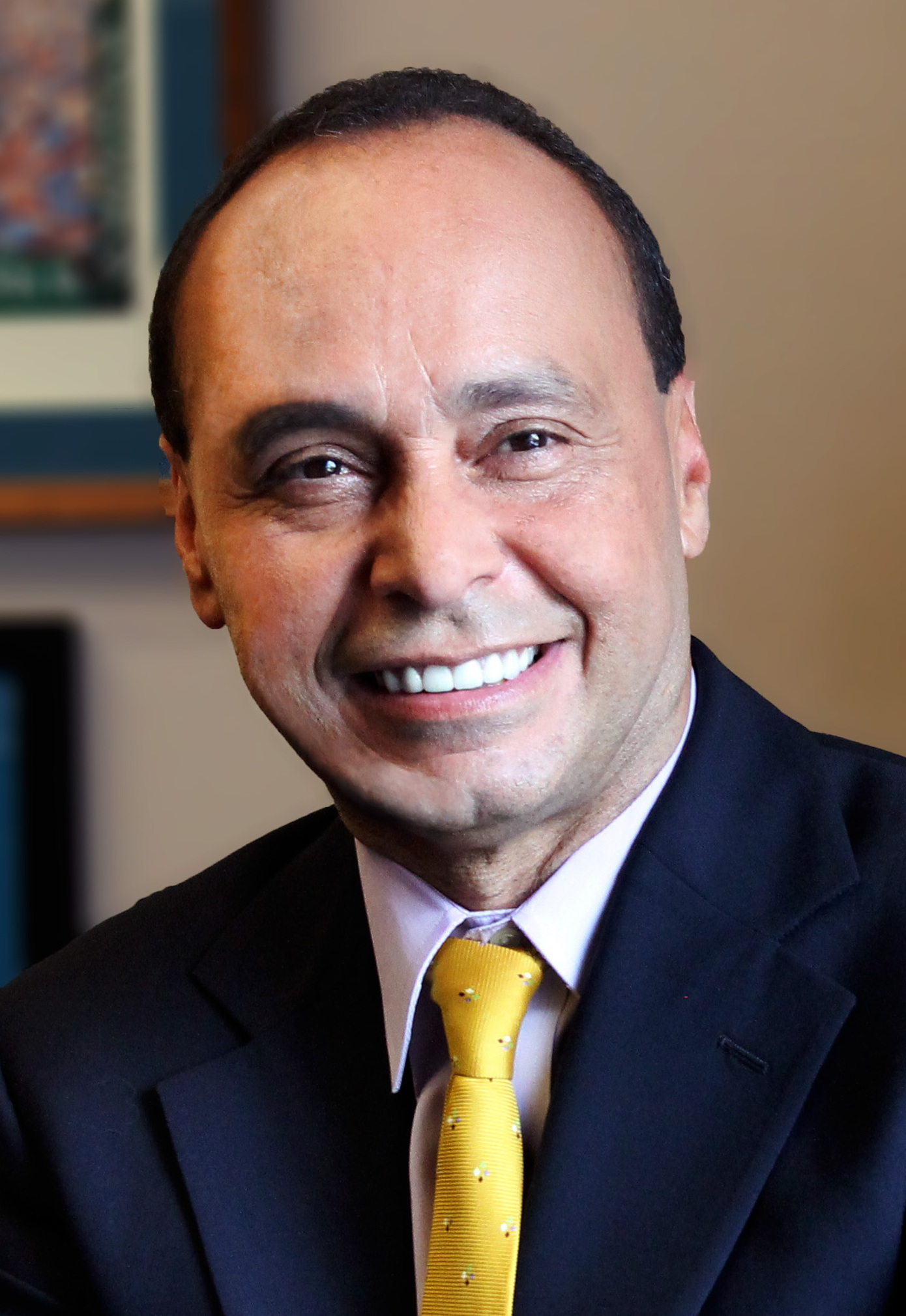

| Nominee | Luis Gutiérrez | Hector Concepción |
| Party | Democratic | Republican |
| Popular vote | 79,666 | 22,278 |
| Percentage | 78.1% | 21.9% |
- County results Gutierrez: 70–80%
U.S. Representative before election
Luis Gutiérrez
Democratic
Elected U.S. Representative
Luis Gutiérrez
Democratic

The 4th district includes portions of Chicago as well as all or parts of the nearby suburbs of Cicero, Berwyn, Riverside, North Riverside, Brookfield, La Grange Park, Hillside, Berkeley, Stone Park and Melrose Park. Incumbent Democrat Luis Gutiérrez, who had represented the 4th district since 1993, ran for re-election. He was re-elected with 83% of the vote in 2012 and the district has a PVI of D+29.

=== Democratic primary ===
==== Candidates ====
===== Nominee =====
- Luis Gutiérrez, incumbent U.S. Representative

===== Eliminated in primary =====
- Alexandra Eidenberg, small business advocate
- Jorge Zavala, diplomatic agent for the Consulate General of Mexico

==== Results ====
Democratic primary results
| Party | Candidate | Votes | % |
|---|---|---|---|
| Democratic | Luis Gutiérrez (incumbent) | 21,625 | 74.3 |
| Democratic | Alexandra Eidenberg | 4,796 | 16.5 |
| Democratic | Jorge Zavala | 2,670 | 9.2 |
| Total votes | | 29,091 | 100.0 |

=== Republican primary ===
==== Candidates ====
===== Nominee =====
- Hector Concepcion, executive director for the Puerto Rican Chamber of Commerce

==== Results ====
Republican primary results
| Party | Candidate | Votes | % |
|---|---|---|---|
| Republican | Hector Concepción | 6,637 | 100.0 |

=== General election ===
==== Endorsements ====
Luis Gutiérrez (D)

Newspapers

- Chicago Tribune

==== Predictions ====
| Source | Ranking | As of |
|---|---|---|
| The Cook Political Report | Safe D | November 3, 2014 |
| Rothenberg | Safe D | October 24, 2014 |
| Sabato's Crystal Ball | Safe D | October 30, 2014 |
| RCP | Safe D | November 2, 2014 |
| Daily Kos Elections | Safe D | November 4, 2014 |

==== Results ====
Concepcion lost to the incumbent representative, Gutiérrez by 56 points, in this solidly Democratic district.

Illinois's 4th congressional district, 2014
| Party | Candidate | Votes | % |
|---|---|---|---|
| Democratic | Luis Gutiérrez (incumbent) | 79,666 | 78.1 |
| Republican | Hector Concepción | 22,278 | 21.9 |
| Total votes | | 101,944 | 100.0 |
| Democratic hold | | | |

== District 5 ==
2014 Illinois's 5th congressional district election
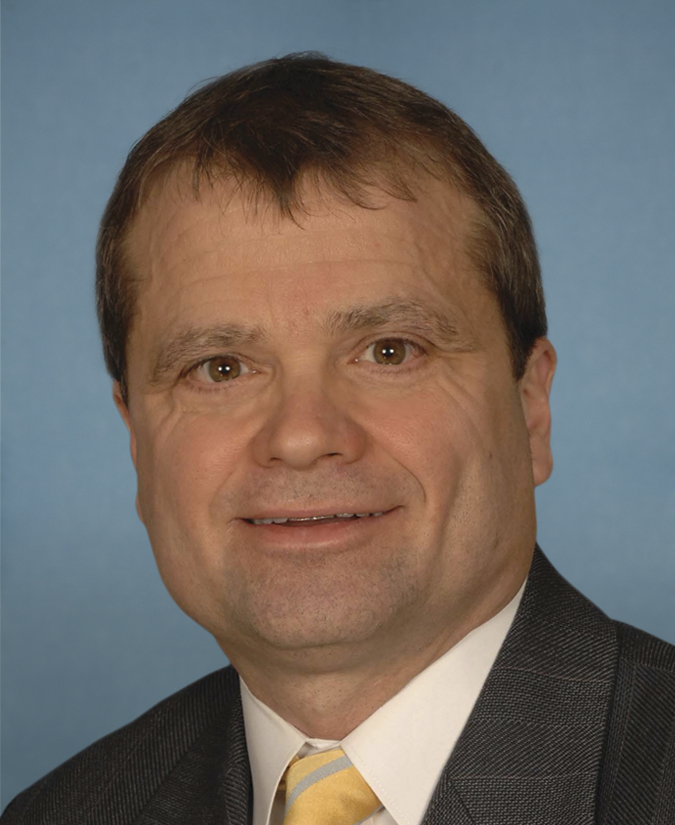

| Nominee | Mike Quigley | Vince Kolber | Nancy Wade |
| Party | Democratic | Republican | Green |
| Popular vote | 116,364 | 56,350 | 11,305 |
| Percentage | 63.3% | 30.6% | 6.1% |
- County results Quigley: 60–70% Kolber: 50–60%
U.S. Representative before election
Mike Quigley
Democratic
Elected U.S. Representative
Mike Quigley
Democratic

Incumbent Democrat Mike Quigley, who had represented the district since 2009, ran for re-election. He was re-elected with 66% of the vote in 2012 and the district has a PVI of D+16.

=== Democratic primary ===
==== Candidates ====
===== Nominee =====
- Mike Quigley, incumbent U.S. Representative

==== Results ====
Democratic primary results
| Party | Candidate | Votes | % |
|---|---|---|---|
| Democratic | Mike Quigley (incumbent) | 26,364 | 100.0 |

=== Republican primary ===
==== Candidates ====
===== Withdrawn =====
Frederick White was seeking the Republican nomination to challenge Quigley. On December 20, 2013, White withdrew from the race.

==== Results ====
Republican primary results
| Party | Candidate | Votes | % |
|---|---|---|---|
| Republican | Frederick White | 21 | 100.0 |

Republican businessman and major GOP donor, Vince Kolber filed to run for the general election.

=== Green primary ===
==== Candidates ====
===== Nominee =====
- Nancy Wade, community activist, schoolteacher and nominee for this seat in 2012

==== Results ====
Green primary results
| Party | Candidate | Votes | % |
|---|---|---|---|
| Green | Nancy Wade | 153 | 100.0 |

=== General election ===
==== Endorsements ====
Mike Quigley (D)

Newspapers

- Chicago Tribune

==== Predictions ====
| Source | Ranking | As of |
|---|---|---|
| The Cook Political Report | Safe D | November 3, 2014 |
| Rothenberg | Safe D | October 24, 2014 |
| Sabato's Crystal Ball | Safe D | October 30, 2014 |
| RCP | Safe D | November 2, 2014 |
| Daily Kos Elections | Safe D | November 4, 2014 |

==== Results ====
Quigley won re-election against his Republican challenger, Vince Kolber, by 32 points.

Illinois's 5th congressional district, 2014
| Party | Candidate | Votes | % |
|---|---|---|---|
| Democratic | Mike Quigley (incumbent) | 116,364 | 63.3 |
| Republican | Vince Kolber | 56,350 | 30.6 |
| Green | Nancy Wade | 11,305 | 6.1 |
| Total votes | | 184,019 | 100.0 |
| Democratic hold | | | |

== District 6 ==
2014 Illinois's 6th congressional district election
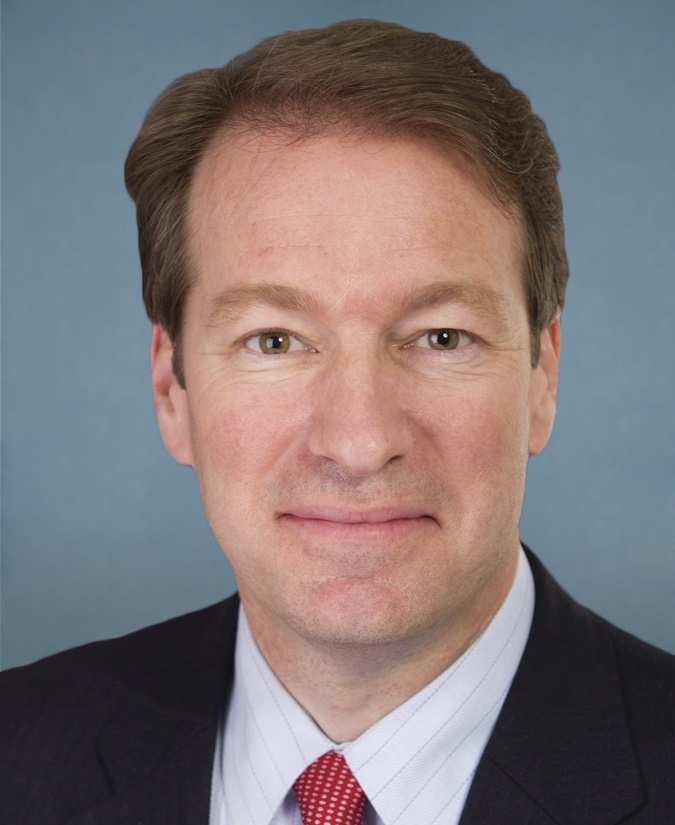

| Nominee | Peter Roskam | Michael Mason |
| Party | Republican | Democratic |
| Popular vote | 160,287 | 78,465 |
| Percentage | 67.1% | 32.9% |
- County results Roskam: 60–70% 70–80%
U.S. Representative before election
Peter Roskam
Republican
Elected U.S. Representative
Peter Roskam
Republican

Incumbent Republican Peter Roskam, who had represented the district since 2007, ran for re-election. He was re-elected with 59% of the vote in 2012 and the district has a PVI of R+4.

=== Republican primary ===
==== Candidates ====
===== Nominee =====
- Peter Roskam, incumbent U.S. Representative

==== Results ====
Republican primary results
| Party | Candidate | Votes | % |
|---|---|---|---|
| Republican | Peter Roskam (incumbent) | 65,332 | 100.0 |

=== Democratic primary ===
==== Candidates ====
===== Nominee =====
- Michael Mason, retired postal manager

==== Results ====
Democratic primary results
| Party | Candidate | Votes | % |
|---|---|---|---|
| Democratic | Michael Mason | 8,615 | 100.0 |

=== General election ===
==== Endorsements ====
Peter Roskam (R)

Newspapers

- Chicago Tribune

==== Predictions ====
| Source | Ranking | As of |
|---|---|---|
| The Cook Political Report | Safe R | November 3, 2014 |
| Rothenberg | Safe R | October 24, 2014 |
| Sabato's Crystal Ball | Safe R | October 30, 2014 |
| RCP | Safe R | November 2, 2014 |
| Daily Kos Elections | Safe R | November 4, 2014 |

==== Results ====
Illinois's 6th congressional district, 2014
| Party | Candidate | Votes | % |
|---|---|---|---|
| Republican | Peter Roskam (incumbent) | 160,287 | 67.1 |
| Democratic | Michael Mason | 78,465 | 32.9 |
| Total votes | | 238,752 | 100.0 |
| Republican hold | | | |

== District 7 ==
2014 Illinois's 7th congressional district election
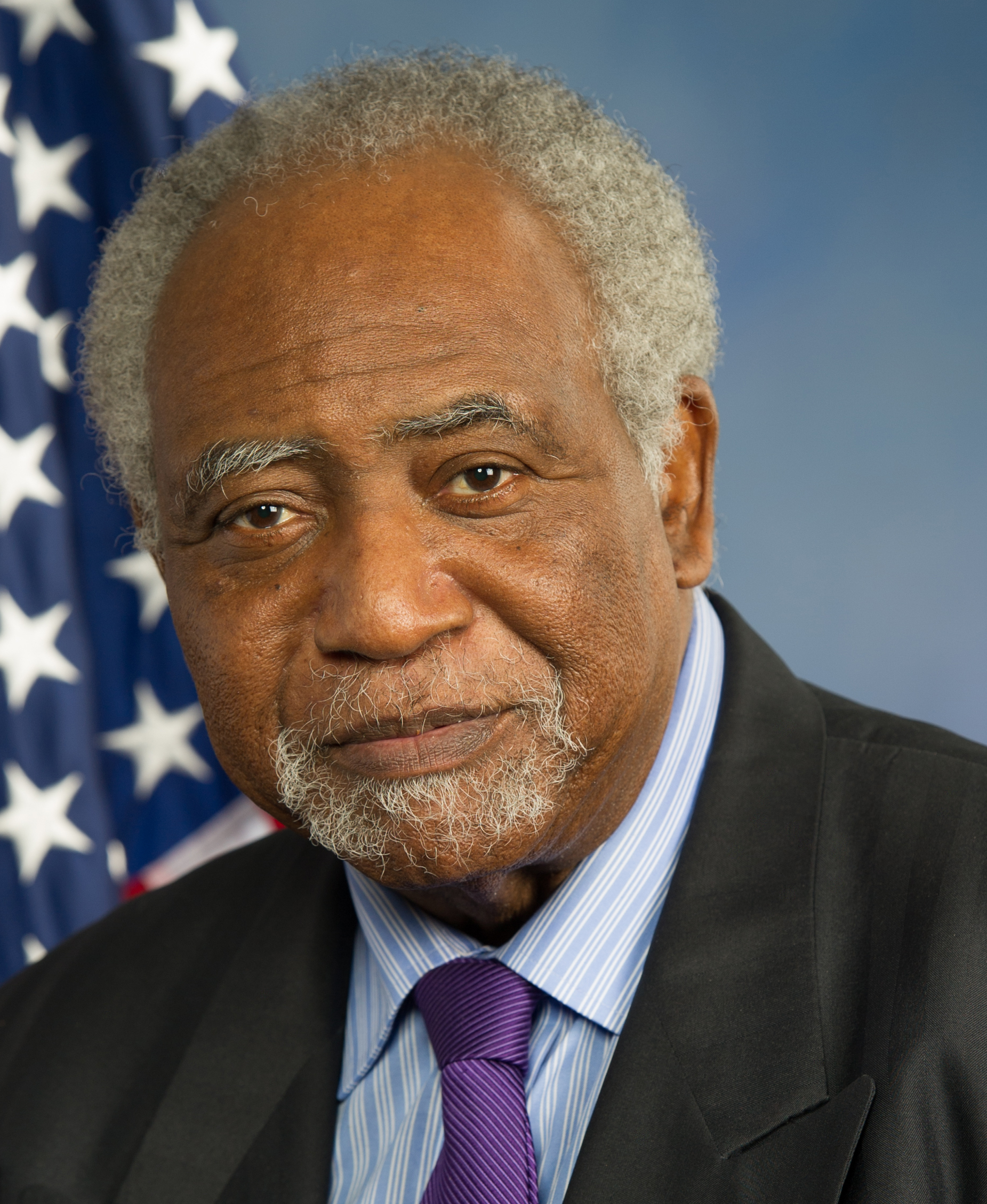

| Nominee | Danny K. Davis | Robert Bumpers |
| Party | Democratic | Republican |
| Popular vote | 155,110 | 27,168 |
| Percentage | 85.1% | 14.9% |
- County results Davis: 80–90%
U.S. Representative before election
Danny K. Davis
Democratic
Elected U.S. Representative
Danny K. Davis
Democratic

The 7th district includes portions of Chicago as well as all or parts of the nearby suburbs of Cicero, Berwyn, Riverside, North Riverside, Oak Park, River Forest, Forest Park, Maywood, Broadview and Westchester. Incumbent Democrat Danny K. Davis, who had represented the district since 1997, ran for re-election. He was re-elected with 85% of the vote in 2012 and the district has a PVI of D+36.

=== Democratic primary ===
==== Candidates ====
===== Nominee =====
- Danny K. Davis, incumbent U.S. Representative

===== Withdrawn =====
- Dan Roche

==== Results ====
Democratic primary results
| Party | Candidate | Votes | % |
|---|---|---|---|
| Democratic | Danny K. Davis (incumbent) | 43,061 | 100.0 |

=== Republican primary ===
==== Candidates ====
===== Nominee =====
- Robert Bumpers

==== Results ====
Republican primary results
| Party | Candidate | Votes | % |
|---|---|---|---|
| Republican | Robert Bumpers | 7,289 | 100.0 |

=== General election ===
==== Endorsements ====
Danny Davis (D)

Newspapers

- Chicago Tribune

==== Predictions ====
| Source | Ranking | As of |
|---|---|---|
| The Cook Political Report | Safe D | November 3, 2014 |
| Rothenberg | Safe D | October 24, 2014 |
| Sabato's Crystal Ball | Safe D | October 30, 2014 |
| RCP | Safe D | November 2, 2014 |
| Daily Kos Elections | Safe D | November 4, 2014 |

==== Results ====
Illinois's 7th congressional district, 2014
| Party | Candidate | Votes | % |
|---|---|---|---|
| Democratic | Danny K. Davis (incumbent) | 155,110 | 85.1 |
| Republican | Robert Bumpers | 27,168 | 14.9 |
| Total votes | | 182,278 | 100.0 |
| Democratic hold | | | |

== District 8 ==
2014 Illinois's 8th congressional district election
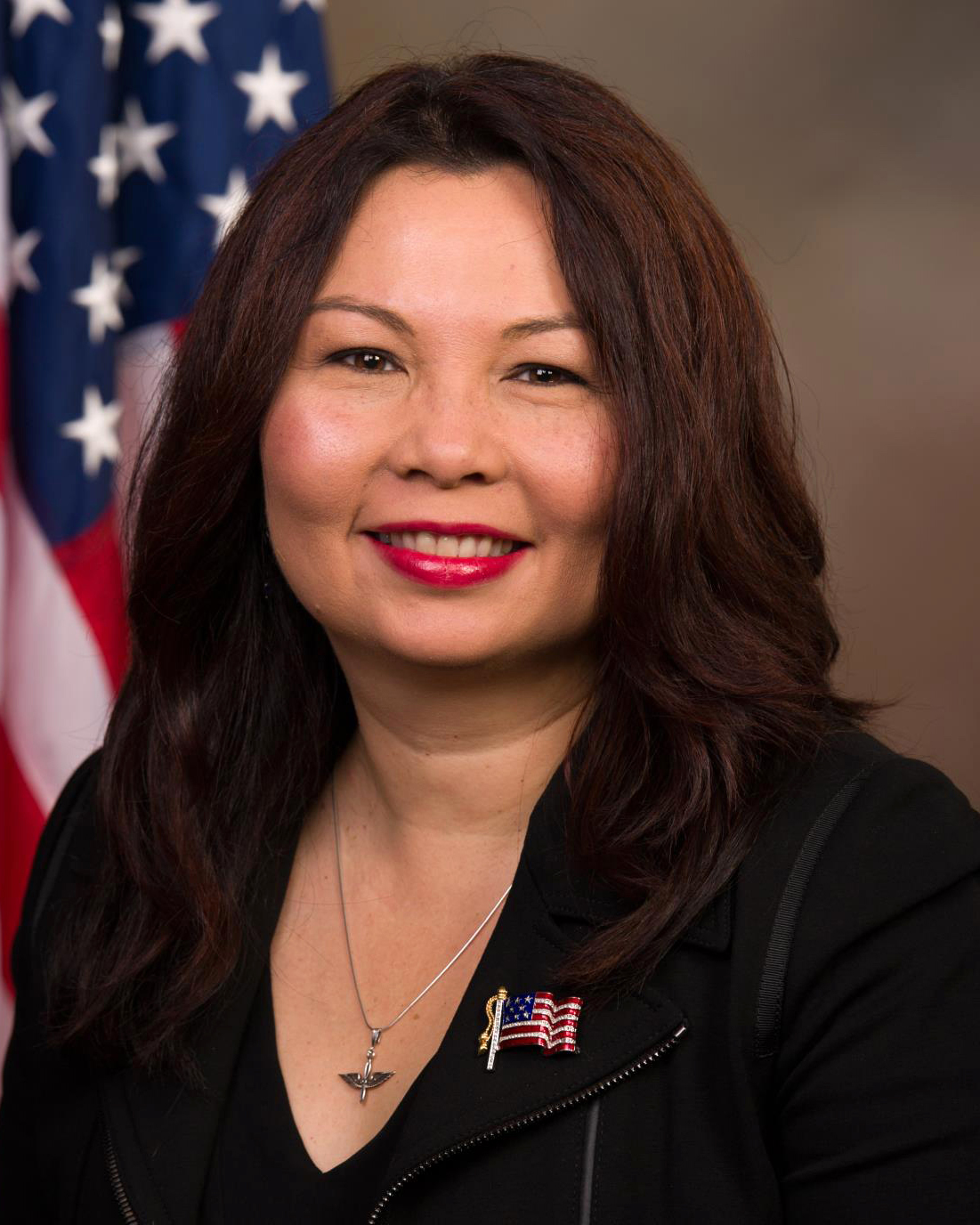

| Nominee | Tammy Duckworth | Larry Kaifesh |
| Party | Democratic | Republican |
| Popular vote | 84,178 | 66,878 |
| Percentage | 55.7% | 44.3% |
- County results Duckworth: 50–60%
U.S. Representative before election
Tammy Duckworth
Democratic
Elected U.S. Representative
Tammy Duckworth
Democratic

Incumbent Democrat Tammy Duckworth, who had represented the district since 2013, ran for re-election. She was elected with 55% of the vote in 2012, defeating Republican incumbent Joe Walsh. The district has a PVI of D+8.

=== Democratic primary ===
==== Candidates ====
===== Nominee =====
- Tammy Duckworth, incumbent U.S. Representative

==== Results ====
Democratic primary results
| Party | Candidate | Votes | % |
|---|---|---|---|
| Democratic | Tammy Duckworth (incumbent) | 10,661 | 100.0 |

=== Republican primary ===
==== Candidates ====
===== Nominee =====
- Larry Kaifesh, Colonel in the United States Marine Corps

===== Eliminated in primary =====
- Manju Goel, healthcare consultant

==== Results ====
Republican primary results
| Party | Candidate | Votes | % |
|---|---|---|---|
| Republican | Larry Kaifesh | 24,657 | 71.5 |
| Republican | Manju Goel | 9,827 | 28.5 |
| Total votes | | 34,484 | 100.0 |

=== General election ===
==== Endorsements ====
Tammy Duckworth (D)

Newspapers

- Chicago Tribune

==== Predictions ====
| Source | Ranking | As of |
|---|---|---|
| The Cook Political Report | Likely D | November 3, 2014 |
| Rothenberg | Safe D | October 24, 2014 |
| Sabato's Crystal Ball | Safe D | October 30, 2014 |
| RCP | Safe D | November 2, 2014 |
| Daily Kos Elections | Safe D | November 4, 2014 |

==== Results ====
Illinois's 8th congressional district, 2014
| Party | Candidate | Votes | % |
|---|---|---|---|
| Democratic | Tammy Duckworth (incumbent) | 84,178 | 55.7 |
| Republican | Larry Kaifesh | 66,878 | 44.3 |
| Total votes | | 151,056 | 100.0 |
| Democratic hold | | | |

== District 9 ==
2014 Illinois's 9th congressional district election
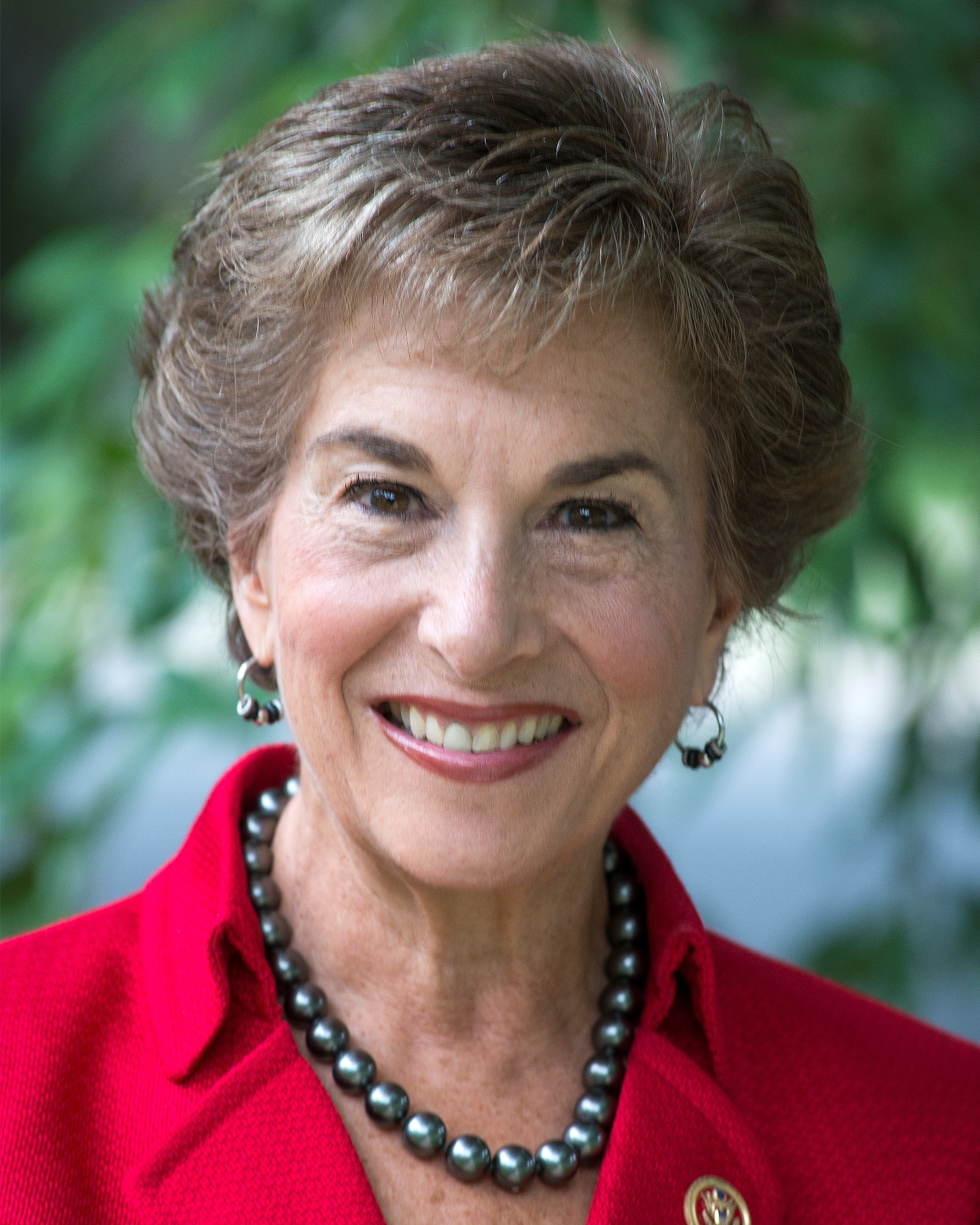

| Nominee | Jan Schakowsky | Susanne Atanus |
| Party | Democratic | Republican |
| Popular vote | 141,000 | 72,384 |
| Percentage | 66.1% | 33.9% |
- County results Schakowsky: 60–70%
U.S. Representative before election
Jan Schakowsky
Democratic
Elected U.S. Representative
Jan Schakowsky
Democratic

Incumbent Democrat Jan Schakowsky, who had represented the district since 1999, ran for re-election. She was re-elected with 66% of the vote in 2012 and the district had a PVI of D+15.

=== Democratic primary ===
==== Candidates ====
===== Nominee =====
- Jan Schakowsky, incumbent U.S. Representative

==== Results ====
Democratic primary results
| Party | Candidate | Votes | % |
|---|---|---|---|
| Democratic | Jan Schakowsky (incumbent) | 31,576 | 100.0 |

=== Republican primary ===
==== Candidates ====
===== Nominee =====
- Susanne Atanus, contracting officer and substitute teacher

===== Eliminated in primary =====
- David Earl Williams III, healthcare professional

==== Results ====
Atanus won the primary, with 15,412 (52.4%) votes.

Republican primary results
| Party | Candidate | Votes | % |
|---|---|---|---|
| Republican | Susanne Atanus | 15,575 | 52.4 |
| Republican | David Williams III | 14,148 | 47.6 |
| Total votes | | 29,723 | 100.0 |

=== General election ===
==== Endorsements ====
Jan Schakowsky (D)

Newspapers

- Chicago Tribune

==== Predictions ====
| Source | Ranking | As of |
|---|---|---|
| The Cook Political Report | Safe D | November 3, 2014 |
| Rothenberg | Safe D | October 24, 2014 |
| Sabato's Crystal Ball | Safe D | October 30, 2014 |
| RCP | Safe D | November 2, 2014 |
| Daily Kos Elections | Safe D | November 4, 2014 |

==== Results ====
Illinois's 9th congressional district, 2014
| Party | Candidate | Votes | % |
|---|---|---|---|
| Democratic | Jan Schakowsky (incumbent) | 141,000 | 66.1 |
| Republican | Susanne Atanus | 72,384 | 33.9 |
| Independent | Phil Collins (write-in) | 66 | 0.0 |
| Total votes | | 213,450 | 100.0 |
| Democratic hold | | | |

== District 10 ==
2014 Illinois's 10th congressional district election
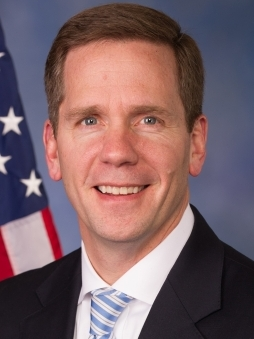

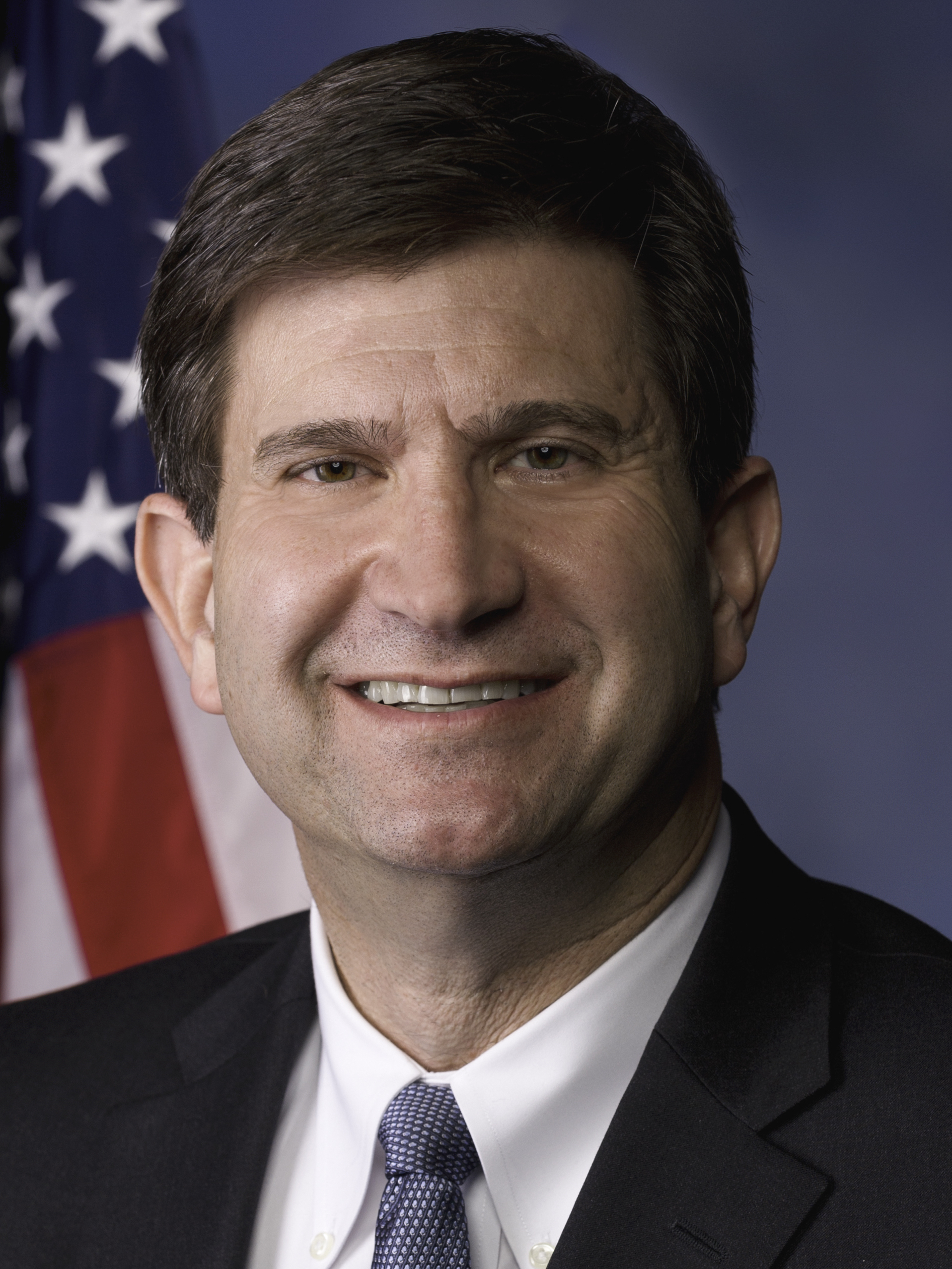
| Nominee | Bob Dold | Brad Schneider |
| Party | Republican | Democratic |
| Popular vote | 95,992 | 91,136 |
| Percentage | 51.3% | 48.7% |
- County results Dold: 50–60%
U.S. Representative before election
Brad Schneider
Democratic
Elected U.S. Representative
Bob Dold
Republican

Incumbent Democrat Brad Schneider, who had represented the district since 2013, ran for re-election. He was elected with 51% of the vote in 2012, defeating Republican incumbent Bob Dold. The district had a PVI of D+8.

=== Democratic primary ===
==== Candidates ====
===== Nominee =====
- Brad Schneider, incumbent U.S. Representative

===== Disqualified =====
- Arlene Hickory

==== Results ====
Democratic primary results 2014
| Party | Candidate | Votes | % |
|---|---|---|---|
| Democratic | Brad Schneider (incumbent) | 11,945 | 100.0 |

=== Republican primary ===
==== Candidates ====
===== Nominee =====
- Bob Dold, former U.S. Representative

==== Results ====
Republican primary results 2014
| Party | Candidate | Votes | % |
|---|---|---|---|
| Republican | Bob Dold | 32,124 | 100.0 |

=== General election ===
==== Endorsements ====
Brad Schneider (D)

Organizations

- Democratic Congressional Campaign Committee "Frontline" Program
Bob Dold (R)

Organizations

- National Republican Congressional Committee "Young Guns" Program

Newspapers

- Chicago Tribune

==== Polling ====
| Poll source | Date(s) administered | Sample size | Margin of error | Brad Schneider (D) | Bob Dold (R) | Undecided |
|---|---|---|---|---|---|---|
| We Ask America | October 21, 2014 | – | – | 45% | 47% | 8% |
| Lester/GSG/GSG/DCCC (D) | October 4–6, 2014 | 400 | ± 4.9% | 48% | 40% | 11% |
| We Ask America | September 30, 2014 | 919 | ± 3.2% | 46% | 44% | 9% |
| DCCC (D) | September 3, 2014 | 450 | ± 4.6% | 47% | 42% | 11% |
| Harper Polling (R-AAN) | June 24–25, 2014 | 400 | ± 4.9% | 39% | 44% | 17% |

==== Predictions ====
| Source | Ranking | As of |
|---|---|---|
| The Cook Political Report | Tossup | November 3, 2014 |
| Rothenberg | Tossup | October 24, 2014 |
| Sabato's Crystal Ball | Lean R (flip) | October 30, 2014 |
| RCP | Tossup | November 2, 2014 |
| Daily Kos Elections | Tossup | November 4, 2014 |

==== Results ====
Illinois's 10th congressional district, 2014
| Party | Candidate | Votes | % |
|---|---|---|---|
| Republican | Bob Dold | 95,992 | 51.3 |
| Democratic | Brad Schneider (incumbent) | 91,136 | 48.7 |
| Total votes | | 187,128 | 100.0 |
| Republican gain from Democratic | | | |

== District 11 ==
2014 Illinois's 11th congressional district election
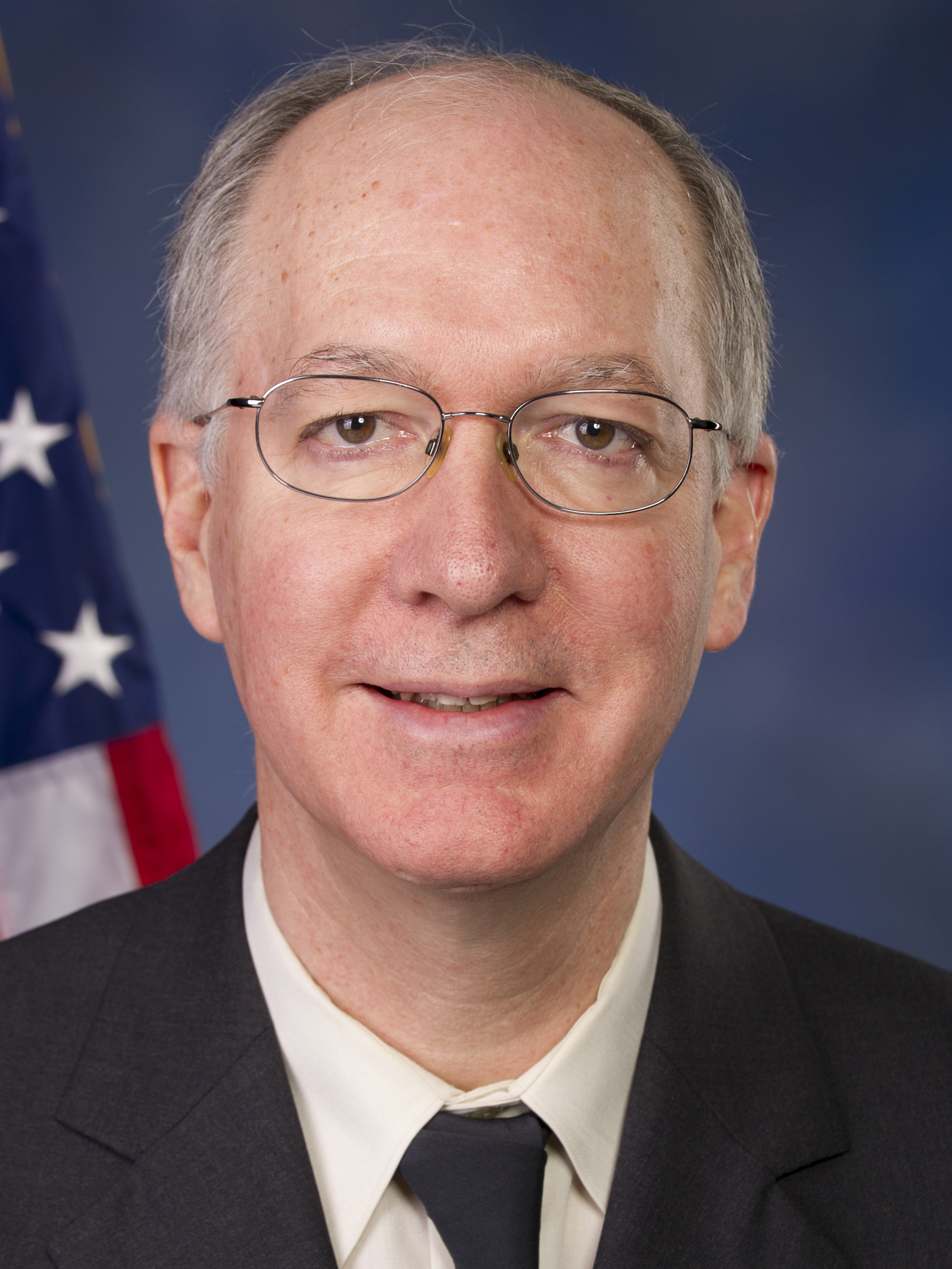

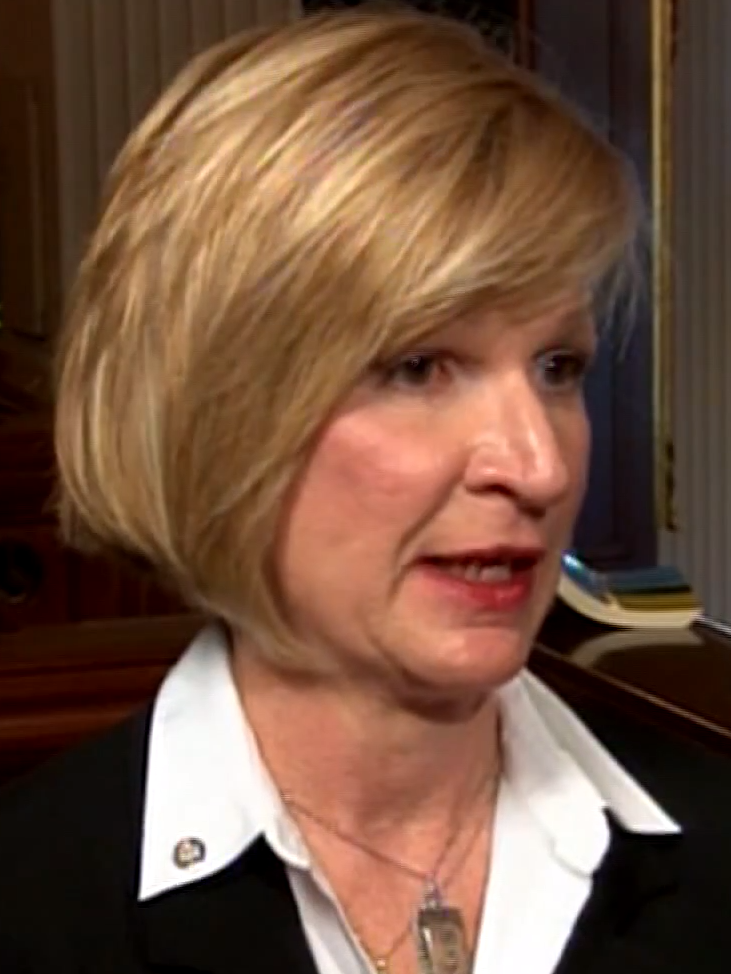
| Nominee | Bill Foster | Darlene Senger |
| Party | Democratic | Republican |
| Popular vote | 93,436 | 81,335 |
| Percentage | 53.5% | 46.5% |
- County results Foster: 50–60% 60–70% Senger: 50–60% 60–70%
U.S. Representative before election
Bill Foster
Democratic
Elected U.S. Representative
Bill Foster
Democratic

Incumbent Democrat Bill Foster, who had represented the district since 2013 and previously represented the 14th district from 2008 to 2011, ran for re-election. He was elected with 59% of the vote in 2012, defeating Republican incumbent Judy Biggert. The district has a PVI of D+8.

=== Democratic primary ===
==== Candidates ====
===== Nominee =====
- Bill Foster, incumbent U.S. Representative

==== Results ====
Democratic primary results
| Party | Candidate | Votes | % |
|---|---|---|---|
| Democratic | Bill Foster (incumbent) | 12,461 | 100.0 |

=== Republican primary ===
==== Candidates ====
===== Nominee =====
- Darlene Senger, state representative

===== Eliminated in primary =====
- Chris Balkema, Grundy County Board member
- Ian Bayne, radio talk show host
- Bert Miller, businessman

===== Withdrawn =====
- Craig Robbins

==== Results ====
Republican primary results
| Party | Candidate | Votes | % |
|---|---|---|---|
| Republican | Darlene Senger | 13,290 | 36.9 |
| Republican | Chris Balkema | 12,024 | 33.4 |
| Republican | Bert Miller | 9,460 | 25.3 |
| Republican | Ian Bayne | 1,253 | 3.5 |
| Total votes | | 36,027 | 100.0 |

=== General election ===
==== Endorsements ====
Bill Foster (D)

Newspapers

- Chicago Tribune
Darlene Senger (R)

Organizations

- National Republican Congressional Committee "Young Guns" Program

==== Polling ====
| Poll source | Date(s) administered | Sample size | Margin of error | Bill Foster (D) | Darlene Senger (R) | Undecided |
|---|---|---|---|---|---|---|
| We Ask America | October 21, 2014 | – | – | 52% | 40% | 8% |
| We Ask America | September 30, 2014 | 918 | ± 3.2% | 47% | 44% | 10% |
| We Ask America (R) | June 11, 2014 | 842 | – | 46% | 42% | 12% |

==== Predictions ====
| Source | Ranking | As of |
|---|---|---|
| The Cook Political Report | Likely D | November 3, 2014 |
| Rothenberg | Safe D | October 24, 2014 |
| Sabato's Crystal Ball | Likely D | October 30, 2014 |
| RCP | Lean D | November 2, 2014 |
| Daily Kos Elections | Likely D | November 4, 2014 |

==== Results ====
Illinois's 11th congressional district, 2014
| Party | Candidate | Votes | % |
|---|---|---|---|
| Democratic | Bill Foster (incumbent) | 93,436 | 53.5 |
| Republican | Darlene Senger | 81,335 | 46.5 |
| Independent | Connor Vlakancic (write-in) | 1 | 0.0 |
| Total votes | | 174,772 | 100.0 |
| Democratic hold | | | |

== District 12 ==
2014 Illinois's 12th congressional district election
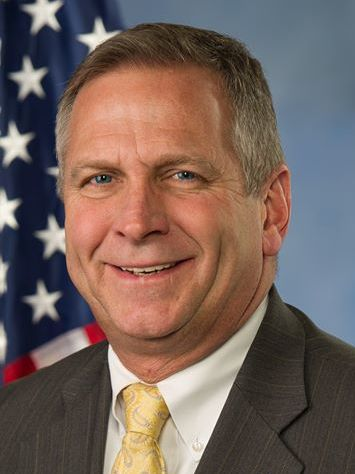

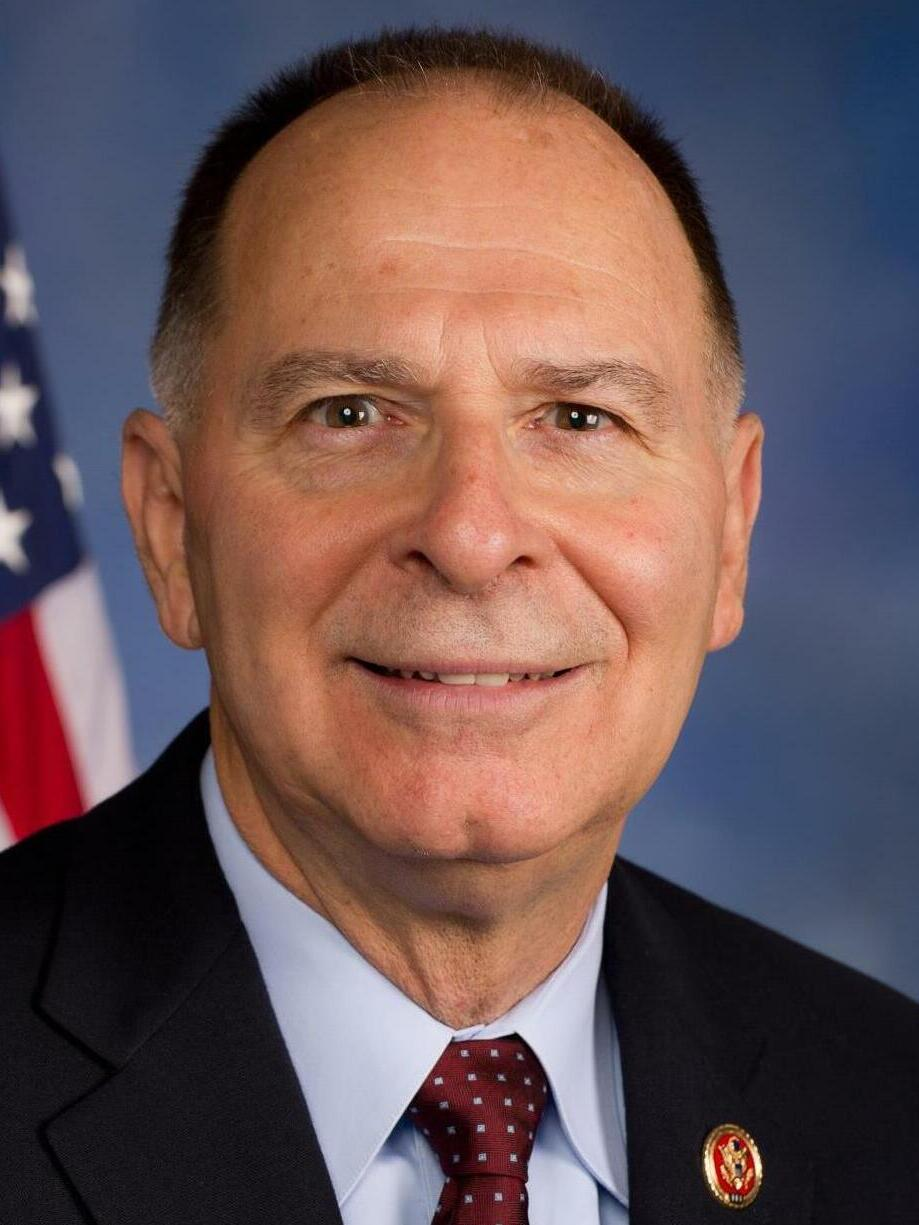

| Nominee | Mike Bost | William Enyart | Paula Bradshaw |
| Party | Republican | Democratic | Green |
| Popular vote | 110,038 | 87,860 | 11,840 |
| Percentage | 52.5% | 41.9% | 5.6% |
- County results Bost: 50–60% 60–70% Enyart: 50–60%
U.S. Representative before election
William Enyart
Democratic
Elected U.S. Representative
Mike Bost
Republican

Incumbent Democrat William Enyart, who had represented the district since 2013, ran for re-election. He was first elected with 52% of the vote in 2012, succeeding retiring Democratic incumbent Jerry Costello. The district had an even PVI.

=== Democratic primary ===
==== Candidates ====
===== Nominee =====
- William Enyart, incumbent U.S. Representative

==== Results ====
Democratic primary results
| Party | Candidate | Votes | % |
|---|---|---|---|
| Democratic | William Enyart (incumbent) | 31,015 | 100.0 |

=== Republican primary ===
==== Candidates ====
===== Nominee =====
- Mike Bost, state representative

==== Results ====
Republican primary results
| Party | Candidate | Votes | % |
|---|---|---|---|
| Republican | Mike Bost | 33,066 | 100.0 |

=== Green primary ===
==== Candidates ====
===== Nominee =====
- Paula Bradshaw, nurse, local radio talk show host and nominee for this seat in 2012

==== Results ====
Green primary results
| Party | Candidate | Votes | % |
|---|---|---|---|
| Green | Paula Bradshaw | 120 | 100.0 |

=== General election ===
==== Endorsements ====
William Enyart (D)

Organizations

- Democratic Congressional Campaign Committee "Frontline" Program

Newspapers

- Chicago Tribune
Mike Bost (R)

Organizations

- National Republican Congressional Committee "Young Guns" Program

==== Polling ====
| Poll source | Date(s) administered | Sample size | Margin of error | William Enyart (D) | Mike Bost (R) | Paula Bradshaw (G) | Undecided |
|---|---|---|---|---|---|---|---|
| We Ask America | October 21, 2014 | – | – | 42% | 43% | 6% | 9% |
| We Ask America | October 1, 2014 | 909 | ± 3.3% | 40% | 45% | 6% | 11% |
| Tarrance Group (R-Bost) | April 21–23, 2014 | 400 | ± 4.9% | 37% | 43% | 9% | 11% |

==== Predictions ====
| Source | Ranking | As of |
|---|---|---|
| The Cook Political Report | Tossup | November 3, 2014 |
| Rothenberg | Tilt R (flip) | October 24, 2014 |
| Sabato's Crystal Ball | Lean R (flip) | October 30, 2014 |
| RCP | Tossup | November 2, 2014 |
| Daily Kos Elections | Tossup | November 4, 2014 |

==== Results ====
Illinois's 12th congressional district, 2014
| Party | Candidate | Votes | % |
|---|---|---|---|
| Republican | Mike Bost | 110,038 | 52.5 |
| Democratic | William Enyart (incumbent) | 87,860 | 41.9 |
| Green | Paula Bradshaw | 11,840 | 5.6 |
| Total votes | | 209,738 | 100.0 |
| Republican gain from Democratic | | | |

== District 13 ==
2014 Illinois's 13th congressional district election
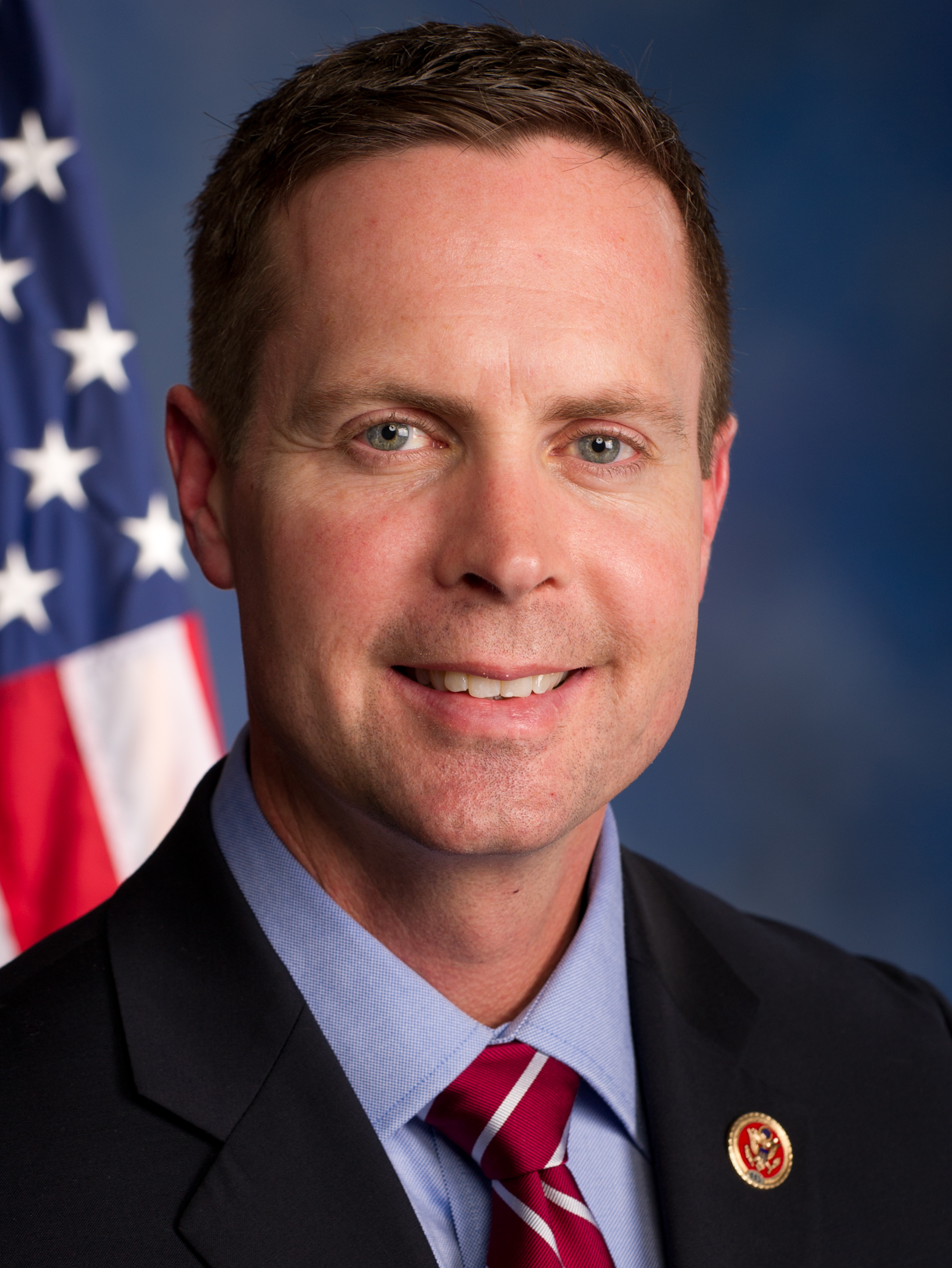

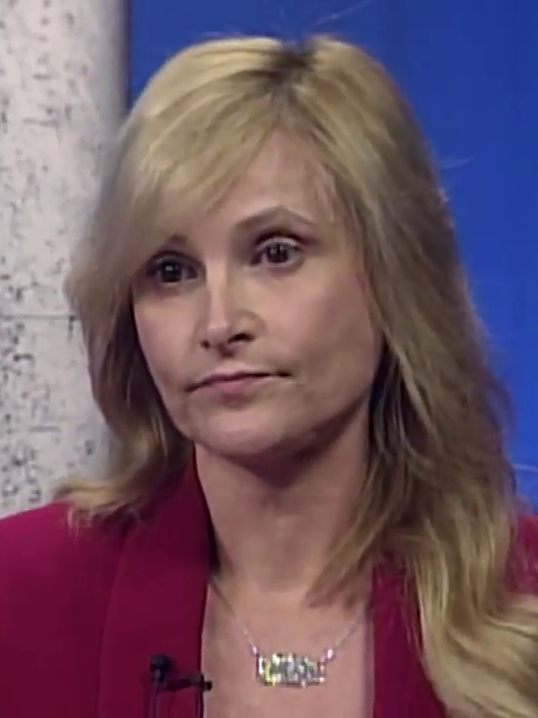
| Nominee | Rodney Davis | Ann Callis |
| Party | Republican | Democratic |
| Popular vote | 123,337 | 86,935 |
| Percentage | 58.7% | 41.3% |
- County results Davis: 50–60% 60–70% 70–80% Callis: 50–60%
U.S. Representative before election
Rodney Davis
Republican
Elected U.S. Representative
Rodney Davis
Republican

Incumbent Republican Rodney L. Davis, who had represented the district since 2013, ran for re-election. He was elected with 47% of the vote in 2012, succeeding retiring Republican incumbent Tim Johnson. The district has an even PVI.

Steve Israel, chairman of the Democratic Congressional Campaign Committee, identified this district as one of his top targets for 2014.

=== Republican primary ===
Michael Firsching, a veterinarian, and Erika Harold, an attorney who also served as Miss America 2003, challenged Davis in the Republican primary.

Harold had attempted to replace then-incumbent Tim Johnson on the general election ballot following his retirement announcement, but was passed over for Davis.

==== Candidates ====
===== Nominee =====
- Rodney Davis, incumbent U.S. Representative

===== Eliminated in primary =====
- Michael Firsching, veterinarian and candidate for this seat in 2012
- Erika Harold, attorney and Miss America 2003

==== Endorsements ====
Erika Harold

Newspapers

- Chicago Tribune

Individuals

- Mike Ditka, former Chicago Bears player and coach

==== Polling ====
| Poll source | Date(s) administered | Sample size | Margin of error | Rodney Davis | Erika Harold | Undecided |
|---|---|---|---|---|---|---|
| Public Opinion Strategies (R-Davis) | November 19–21, 2013 | 400 | ± 4.9% | 63% | 15% | 22% |
| We Ask America | October 10, 2013 | 859 | ± 3.34% | 63% | 16% | 21% |
| We Ask America | June 10, 2013 | 1,178 | ± 2.86% | 54% | 16% | 30% |

==== Results ====
Results by county: Davis—80–90% Davis—70–80% Davis—60–70% Davis—50–60% Harold—70–80% Harold—50–60% Harold—40–50%

Republican primary results
| Party | Candidate | Votes | % |
|---|---|---|---|
| Republican | Rodney Davis (incumbent) | 27,816 | 54.6 |
| Republican | Erika Harold | 20,951 | 41.2 |
| Republican | Michael Firsching | 2,147 | 4.2 |
| Total votes | | 50,914 | 100.0 |

=== Democratic primary ===
==== Candidates ====
===== Nominee =====
- Ann Callis, former Madison County Chief Judge

===== Eliminated in primary =====
- George Gollin, physicist at the University of Illinois at Urbana–Champaign
- David Green, policy analyst at the University of Illinois at Urbana–Champaign

===== Withdrawn =====
- Bill Byrnes, school bus driver

===== Declined =====
- Paul Faraci, Champaign City Council member
- Mike Frerichs, state senator
- David Gill, physician and nominee for the 15th district in 2004, 2006, 2010 and for this seat in 2012
- Chris Koos, Mayor of Normal
- Julia Rietz, Champaign County state's attorney

==== Endorsements ====
Ann Callis

U.S. Senators

- Dick Durbin, (D-IL)

U.S. Representatives

- Nancy Pelosi, former Speaker of the House

State legislators

- Naomi Jakobsson, state representative

Labor unions

- AFL-CIO
- American Federation of State, County and Municipal Employees
George Gollin

Newspapers

- Chicago Tribune
- The State Journal-Register

==== Polling ====
| Poll source | Date(s) administered | Sample size | Margin of error | Ann Callis | George Gollin | David Green | Undecided |
|---|---|---|---|---|---|---|---|
| We Ask America | March 2014 | 1,136 | ± 2.91% | 41% | 25% | 7% | 27% |

==== Results ====
Results by county: Callis—70–80% Callis—60–70% Callis—50–60% Callis—40–50% Gollin—50–60%

Democratic primary results
| Party | Candidate | Votes | % |
|---|---|---|---|
| Democratic | Ann Callis | 17,322 | 54.7 |
| Democratic | George Gollin | 9,935 | 31.3 |
| Democratic | David Green | 4,438 | 14.0 |
| Total votes | | 31,695 | 100.0 |

=== Debate ===
2014 Illinois's 13th congressional district debate
| No. | Date | Host | Moderator | Link | Republican | Democratic |
| Key: P Participant A Absent N Not invited I Invited W Withdrawn | | | | | | |
| Key: P Participant A Absent N Not invited I Invited W Withdrawn | | | | | Rodney Davis | Ann Callis |
|---|---|---|---|---|---|---|
| 1 | Oct. 17, 2014 | Illinois Public Media; League of Women Voters of Illinois; NAACP of Champaign County; The News-Gazette; WCIA | Jennifer Roscoe | | P | P |

==== Endorsements ====
Rodney Davis (R)

Organizations

- National Republican Congressional Committee "Patriot" Program

Newspapers

- Chicago Tribune
Ann Callis (D)

U.S. Senators

- Dick Durbin, (D-IL)

U.S. Representatives

- Nancy Pelosi, former Speaker of the House

State legislators

- Naomi Jakobsson, state representative

Labor unions

- AFL-CIO
- American Federation of State, County and Municipal Employees

Organizations

- Democratic Congressional Campaign Committee "Red to Blue" Program

==== Polling ====
| Poll source | Date(s) administered | Sample size | Margin of error | Rodney Davis (R) | Ann Callis (D) | Undecided |
|---|---|---|---|---|---|---|
| We Ask America | October 21, 2014 | – | – | 53% | 36% | 11% |
| We Ask America | October 1, 2014 | 932 | ± 3.2% | 51% | 38% | 11% |
| Public Opinion Strategies (R-Davis) | September 17–18, 2014 | 400 | ± 4.9% | 55% | 36% | 7% |
| Public Policy Polling (D-Gollin) | October 7–8, 2013 | 738 | – | 40% | 35% | 25% |

Hypothetical polling

| Poll source | Date(s) administered | Sample size | Margin of error | Rodney Davis (R) | George Gollin (D) | Undecided |
|---|---|---|---|---|---|---|
| Public Policy Polling (D-Gollin) | October 7–8, 2013 | 738 | ± ? | 41% | 33% | 26% |

==== Predictions ====
| Source | Ranking | As of |
|---|---|---|
| The Cook Political Report | Likely R | November 3, 2014 |
| Rothenberg | Safe R | October 24, 2014 |
| Sabato's Crystal Ball | Likely R | October 30, 2014 |
| RCP | Lean R | November 2, 2014 |
| Daily Kos Elections | Likely R | November 4, 2014 |

==== Results ====
Illinois's 13th congressional district, 2014
| Party | Candidate | Votes | % |
|---|---|---|---|
| Republican | Rodney Davis (incumbent) | 123,337 | 58.7 |
| Democratic | Ann Callis | 86,935 | 41.3 |
| Total votes | | 210,272 | 100.0 |
| Republican hold | | | |

== District 14 ==
2014 Illinois's 14th congressional district election
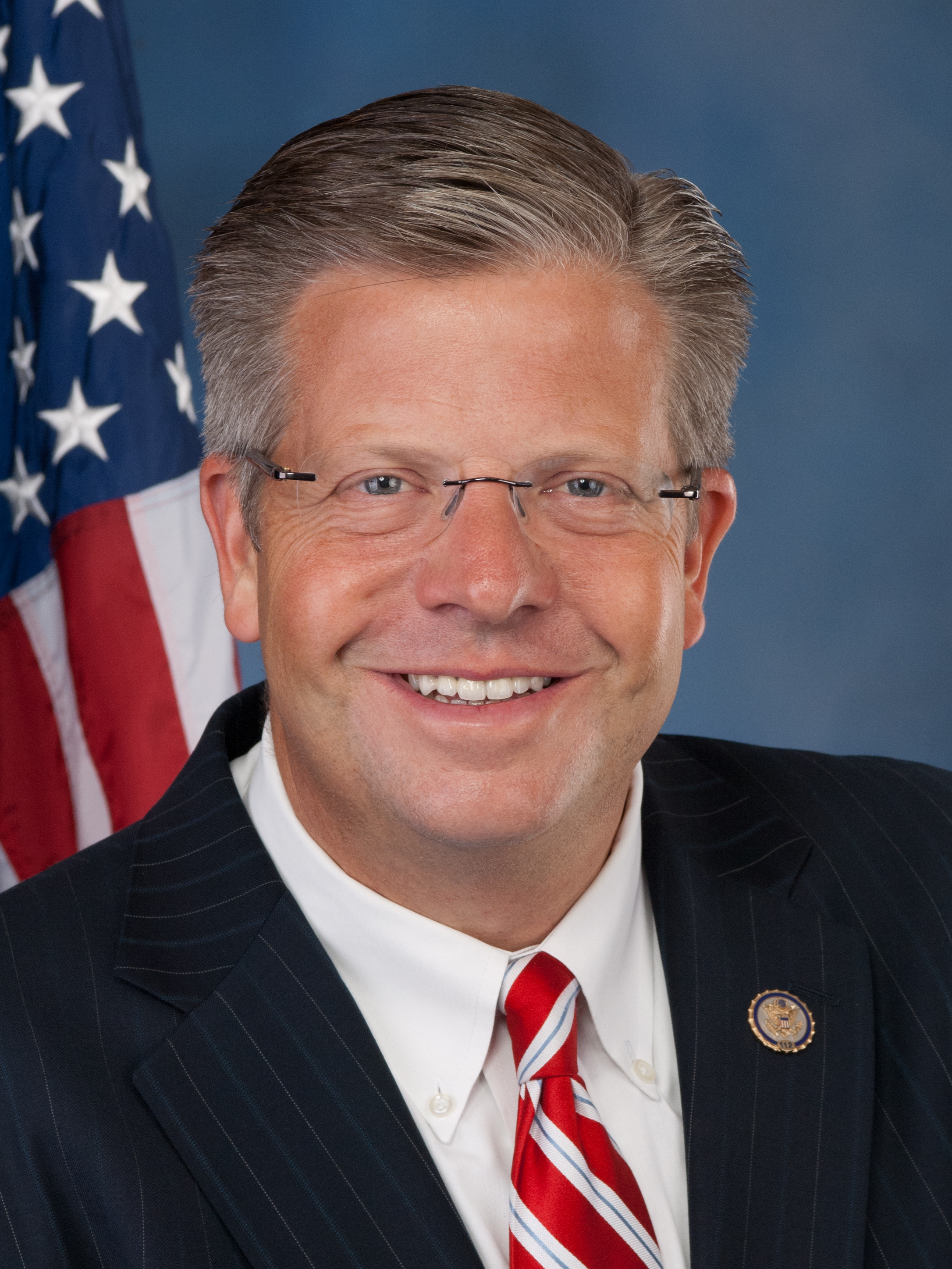

| Nominee | Randy Hultgren | Dennis Anderson |
| Party | Republican | Democratic |
| Popular vote | 145,369 | 76,861 |
| Percentage | 65.4% | 34.6% |
- County results Hultgren: 50–60% 60–70%
U.S. Representative before election
Randy Hultgren
Republican
Elected U.S. Representative
Randy Hultgren
Republican

Incumbent Republican Randy Hultgren, who had represented the district since 2011, ran for re-election. He was re-elected with 59% of the vote in 2012 and the district has a PVI of R+5.

=== Republican primary ===
==== Candidates ====
===== Nominee =====
- Randy Hultgren, incumbent U.S. Representative

==== Results ====
Republican primary results
| Party | Candidate | Votes | % |
|---|---|---|---|
| Republican | Randy Hultgren (incumbent) | 57,665 | 100.0 |

=== Democratic primary ===
==== Candidates ====
===== Nominee =====
- Dennis Anderson, public health researcher and nominee for this seat in 2012

===== Eliminated in primary =====
- John J. Hosta, businessman

==== Endorsements ====
Dennis Anderson

Newspapers

- Chicago Tribune

==== Results ====
Democratic primary results
| Party | Candidate | Votes | % |
|---|---|---|---|
| Democratic | Dennis Anderson | 5,184 | 65.8 |
| Democratic | John J. Hosta | 2,691 | 34.2 |
| Total votes | | 7,875 | 100.0 |

=== General election ===
==== Endorsements ====
Randy Hultgren (R)

Newspapers

- Chicago Tribune

==== Predictions ====
| Source | Ranking | As of |
|---|---|---|
| The Cook Political Report | Safe R | November 3, 2014 |
| Rothenberg | Safe R | October 24, 2014 |
| Sabato's Crystal Ball | Safe R | October 30, 2014 |
| RCP | Safe R | November 2, 2014 |
| Daily Kos Elections | Safe R | November 4, 2014 |

==== Results ====
Illinois's 14th congressional district, 2014
| Party | Candidate | Votes | % |
|---|---|---|---|
| Republican | Randy Hultgren (incumbent) | 145,369 | 65.4 |
| Democratic | Dennis Anderson | 76,861 | 34.6 |
| Total votes | | 222,230 | 100.0 |
| Republican hold | | | |

== District 15 ==
2014 Illinois's 15th congressional district election
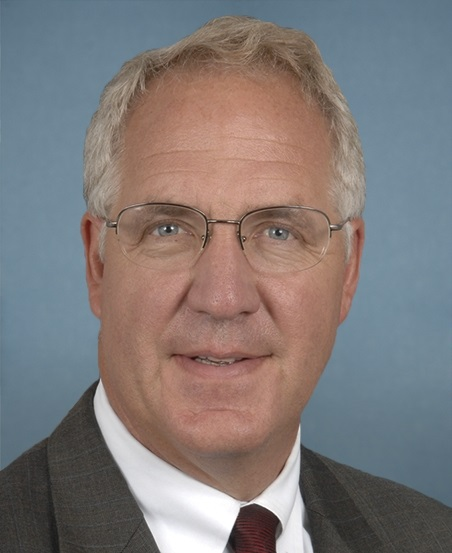

| Nominee | John Shimkus | Eric Thorsland |
| Party | Republican | Democratic |
| Popular vote | 166,274 | 55,652 |
| Percentage | 74.9% | 25.1% |
- County results Shimkus: 60–70% 70–80% 80–90%
U.S. Representative before election
John Shimkus
Republican
Elected U.S. Representative
John Shimkus
Republican

Incumbent Republican John Shimkus, who had represented the district since 2013 and previously represented the 19th district from 2003 to 2013 and the 20th district from 1997 to 2003, ran for re-election. He was re-elected with 69% of the vote in 2012 and the district has a PVI of R+14.

=== Republican primary ===
==== Candidates ====
===== Nominee =====
- John Shimkus, incumbent U.S. Representative

==== Results ====
Republican primary results
| Party | Candidate | Votes | % |
|---|---|---|---|
| Republican | John Shimkus (incumbent) | 66,453 | 100.0 |

=== Democratic primary ===
==== Candidates ====
===== Nominee =====
- Eric Thorsland, farmer

==== Results ====
Democratic primary results
| Party | Candidate | Votes | % |
|---|---|---|---|
| Democratic | Eric Thorsland | 17,108 | 100.0 |

=== General election ===
==== Endorsements ====
John Shimkus (R)

Newspapers

- Chicago Tribune

==== Predictions ====
| Source | Ranking | As of |
|---|---|---|
| The Cook Political Report | Safe R | November 3, 2014 |
| Rothenberg | Safe R | October 24, 2014 |
| Sabato's Crystal Ball | Safe R | October 30, 2014 |
| RCP | Safe R | November 2, 2014 |
| Daily Kos Elections | Safe R | November 4, 2014 |

==== Results ====
Illinois's 15th congressional district, 2014
| Party | Candidate | Votes | % |
|---|---|---|---|
| Republican | John Shimkus (incumbent) | 166,274 | 74.9 |
| Democratic | Eric Thorsland | 55,652 | 25.1 |
| Total votes | | 221,926 | 100.0 |
| Republican hold | | | |

== District 16 ==
2014 Illinois's 16th congressional district election
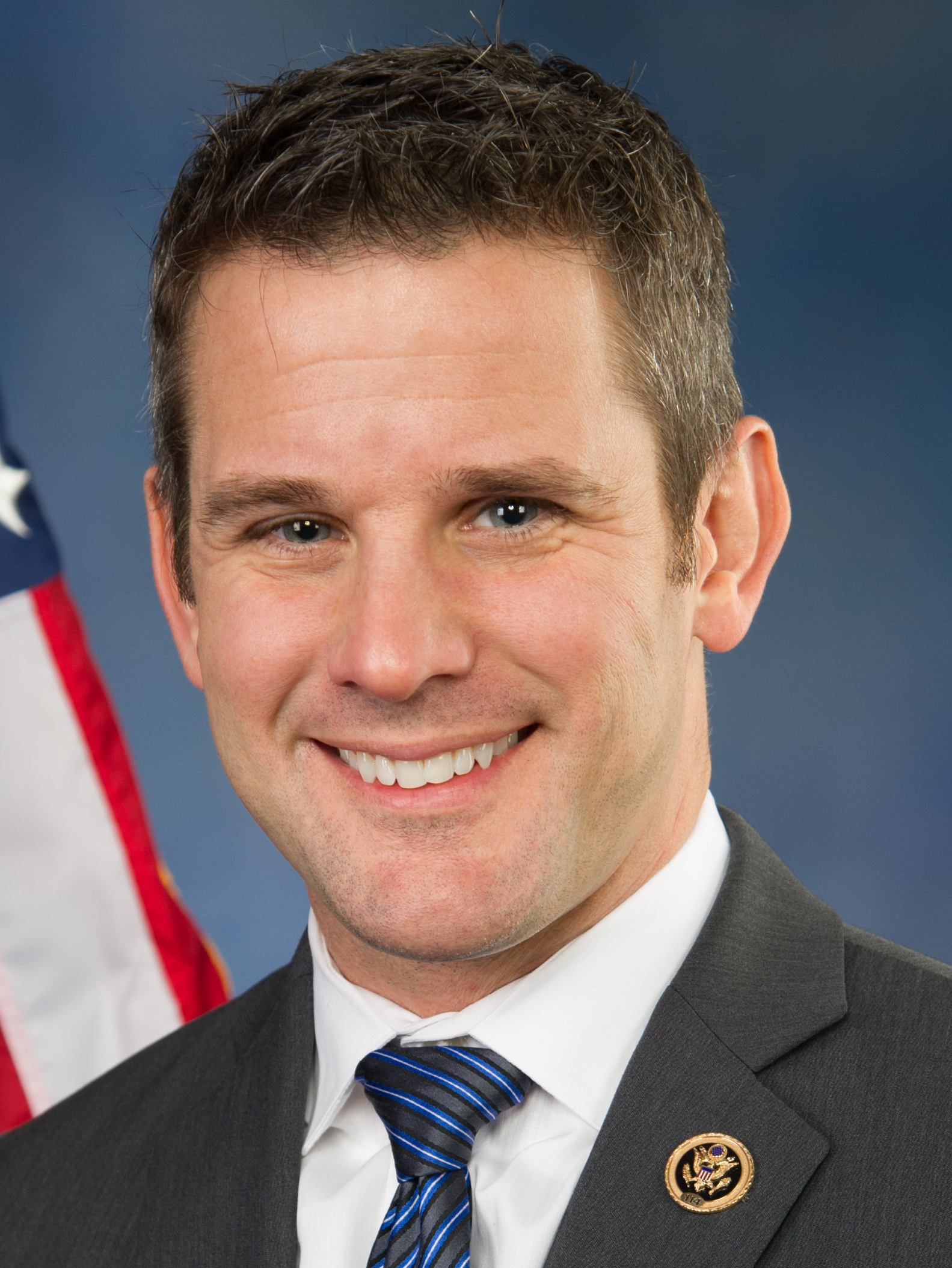

| Nominee | Adam Kinzinger | Randall Olsen |
| Party | Republican | Democratic |
| Popular vote | 153,388 | 63,810 |
| Percentage | 70.6% | 29.4% |
- County results Kinzinger: 50–60% 60–70% 70–80% 80–90%
U.S. Representative before election
Adam Kinzinger
Republican
Elected U.S. Representative
Adam Kinzinger
Republican

Incumbent Republican Adam Kinzinger, who had represented the district since 2013 and previously represented the 11th district from 2011 to 2013, ran for re-election. He was re-elected with 62% of the vote in 2012 and the district had a PVI of R+4.

=== Republican primary ===
==== Candidates ====
===== Nominee =====
- Adam Kinzinger, incumbent U.S. Representative

===== Eliminated in primary =====
- David Hale, nurse and founder of the Rockford Tea Party

==== Endorsements ====
Adam Kinzinger

Newspapers

- Chicago Tribune

==== Results ====
Republican primary results
| Party | Candidate | Votes | % |
|---|---|---|---|
| Republican | Adam Kinzinger (incumbent) | 56,593 | 78.4 |
| Republican | David Hale | 15,558 | 21.6 |
| Total votes | | 72,151 | 100.0 |

=== Democratic primary ===
==== Candidates ====
===== Nominee =====
- Randall Olsen, retired X-ray technician and Air Force veteran

==== Results ====
Democratic primary results
| Party | Candidate | Votes | % |
|---|---|---|---|
| Democratic | Randall Olsen | 12,077 | 100.0 |

=== General election ===
==== Endorsements ====
Adam Kinzinger (R)

Newspapers

- Chicago Tribune

==== Predictions ====
| Source | Ranking | As of |
|---|---|---|
| The Cook Political Report | Safe R | November 3, 2014 |
| Rothenberg | Safe R | October 24, 2014 |
| Sabato's Crystal Ball | Safe R | October 30, 2014 |
| RCP | Safe R | November 2, 2014 |
| Daily Kos Elections | Safe R | November 4, 2014 |

==== Results ====
Illinois's 16th congressional district, 2014
| Party | Candidate | Votes | % |
|---|---|---|---|
| Republican | Adam Kinzinger (incumbent) | 153,388 | 70.6 |
| Democratic | Randall Olsen | 63,810 | 29.4 |
| Total votes | | 217,198 | 100.0 |
| Republican hold | | | |

== District 17 ==
2014 Illinois's 17th congressional district election
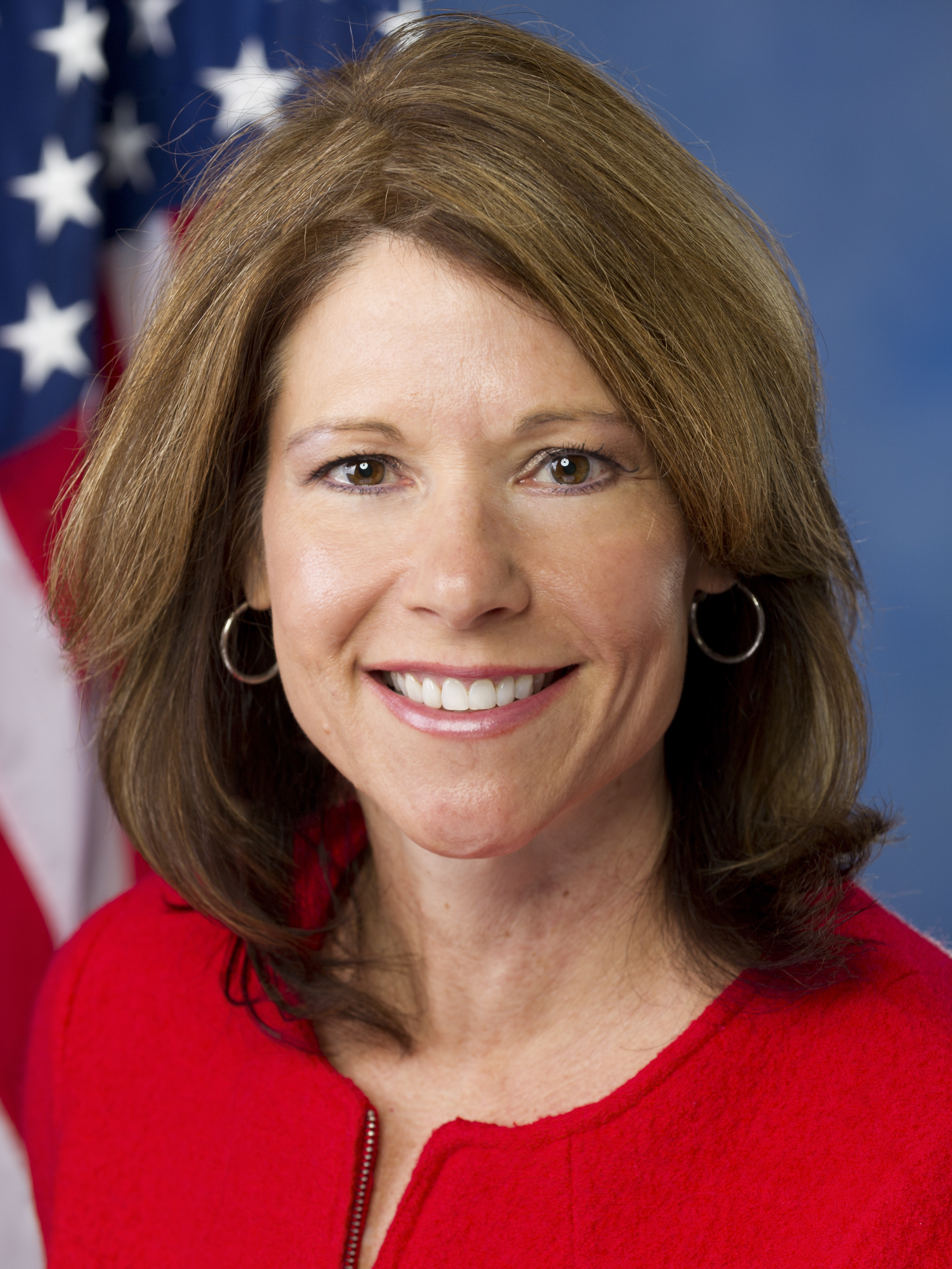

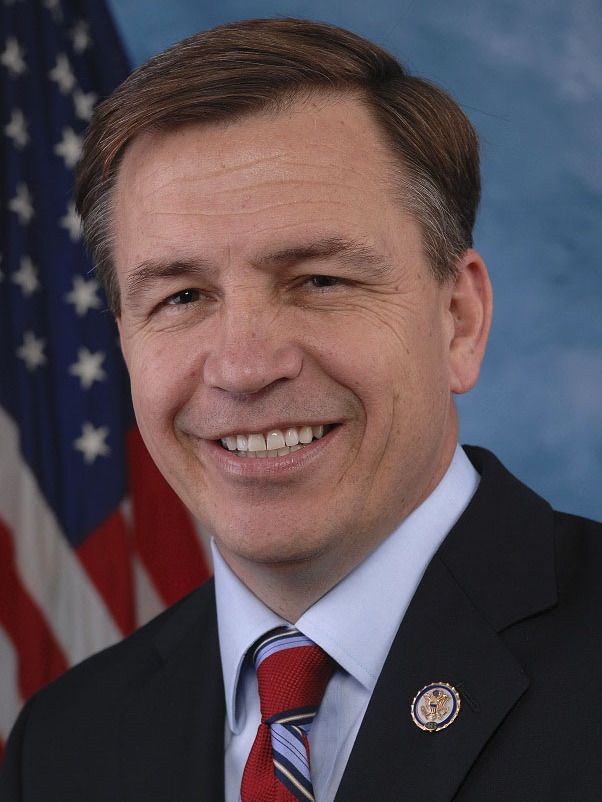
| Nominee | Cheri Bustos | Bobby Schilling |
| Party | Democratic | Republican |
| Popular vote | 110,560 | 88,785 |
| Percentage | 55.5% | 44.5% |
- County results Bustos: 50–60% 60–70% Schilling: 50–60%
U.S. Representative before election
Cheri Bustos
Democratic
Elected U.S. Representative
Cheri Bustos
Democratic

Incumbent Democrat Cheri Bustos, who had represented the district since 2013, ran for re-election. She was elected with 53% of the vote in 2012, defeating Republican incumbent Bobby Schilling. The district had a PVI of D+7.

=== Democratic primary ===
==== Candidates ====
===== Nominee =====
- Cheri Bustos, incumbent U.S. Representative

==== Results ====
Democratic primary results
| Party | Candidate | Votes | % |
|---|---|---|---|
| Democratic | Cheri Bustos (incumbent) | 21,923 | 100.0 |

=== Republican primary ===
==== Candidates ====
===== Nominee =====
- Bobby Schilling, former U.S. Representative

===== Withdrawn =====
- Eric Reyes, attorney

==== Results ====
Republican primary results
| Party | Candidate | Votes | % |
|---|---|---|---|
| Republican | Bobby Schilling | 41,063 | 100.0 |

=== General election ===
==== Endorsements ====
Cheri Bustos (D)

Organizations

- Democratic Congressional Campaign Committee "Frontline" Program
Bobby Schilling (R)

Organizations

- National Republican Congressional Committee "Young Guns" Program

Newspapers

- Chicago Tribune

==== Polling ====
| Poll source | Date(s) administered | Sample size | Margin of error | Cheri Bustos (D) | Bobby Schilling (R) | Undecided |
|---|---|---|---|---|---|---|
| We Ask America | October 21, 2014 | – | – | 55% | 39% | 6% |
| We Ask America | September 29, 2014 | 953 | ± 3.2% | 50% | 41% | 9% |
| Capital Fax/We Ask America | September 17, 2013 | 1,496 | ± 2.7% | 45% | 44% | 11% |

==== Predictions ====
| Source | Ranking | As of |
|---|---|---|
| The Cook Political Report | Lean D | November 3, 2014 |
| Rothenberg | Likely D | October 24, 2014 |
| Sabato's Crystal Ball | Likely D | October 30, 2014 |
| RCP | Lean D | November 2, 2014 |
| Daily Kos Elections | Lean D | November 4, 2014 |

==== Results ====
Illinois's 17th congressional district, 2014
| Party | Candidate | Votes | % |
|---|---|---|---|
| Democratic | Cheri Bustos (incumbent) | 110,560 | 55.5 |
| Republican | Bobby Schilling | 88,785 | 44.5 |
| Independent | Bill Fawell (write-in) | 16 | 0.0 |
| Total votes | | 199,361 | 100.0 |
| Democratic hold | | | |

== District 18 ==
2014 Illinois's 18th congressional district election
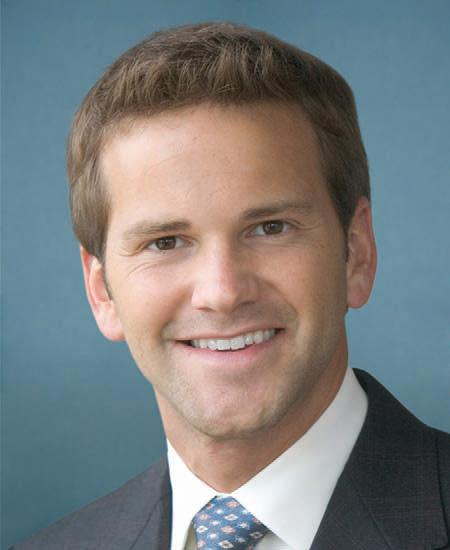

| Nominee | Aaron Schock | Darrel Miller |
| Party | Republican | Democratic |
| Popular vote | 184,363 | 62,377 |
| Percentage | 74.7% | 25.3% |
- County results Schock: 60–70% 70–80% 80–90%
U.S. Representative before election
Aaron Schock
Republican
Elected U.S. Representative
Aaron Schock
Republican

Incumbent Republican Aaron Schock, who had represented the district since 2009, ran for re-election. He was elected with 74% of the vote in 2012 and the district had a PVI of R+11.

=== Republican primary ===
==== Candidates ====
===== Nominee =====
- Aaron Schock, incumbent U.S. Representative

==== Results ====
Republican primary results
| Party | Candidate | Votes | % |
|---|---|---|---|
| Republican | Aaron Schock (incumbent) | 82,412 | 100.0 |

=== Democratic primary ===
==== Candidates ====
===== Nominee =====
- Darrel Miller, farmer

===== Eliminated in primary =====
- Rob Mellon, schoolteacher and Army veteran

==== Endorsements ====
Darrel Miller

Newspapers

- Chicago Tribune

==== Results ====
Democratic primary results
| Party | Candidate | Votes | % |
|---|---|---|---|
| Democratic | Darrel Miller | 6,763 | 54.3 |
| Democratic | Rob Mellon | 5,692 | 45.7 |
| Total votes | | 12,455 | 100.0 |

=== General election ===
==== Endorsements ====
Aaron Schock (R)

Newspapers

- Chicago Tribune

==== Predictions ====
| Source | Ranking | As of |
|---|---|---|
| The Cook Political Report | Safe R | November 3, 2014 |
| Rothenberg | Safe R | October 24, 2014 |
| Sabato's Crystal Ball | Safe R | October 30, 2014 |
| RCP | Safe R | November 2, 2014 |
| Daily Kos Elections | Safe R | November 4, 2014 |

==== Results ====
Illinois's 18th congressional district, 2014
| Party | Candidate | Votes | % |
|---|---|---|---|
| Republican | Aaron Schock (Incumbent) | 184,363 | 74.7 |
| Democratic | Darrel Miller | 62,377 | 25.3 |
| Total votes | | 246,740 | 100.0 |
| Republican hold | | | |

== See also ==
- 2014 Illinois elections
- 2014 United States House of Representatives elections
- 2014 United States elections
