= Gerald Hawkins (politician) =

American politician

Gerald "Jerry" Hawkins (September 20, 1943 – September 30, 2015) was an American politician.

Born in Du Quoin, Illinois, Hawkins moved with his family to Sparta, Illinois and graduated from Sparta Community High School in 1961. He served in the United States Army Reserves.

Hawkins worked in a men's clothing store and in the insurance business. He also worked in the coal mines and was involved with the United Mine Workers of America.

He served on the Perry County Commission. A Democrat, he served in the Illinois House of Representatives from 1993 to 1995.

Hawkins died at his home in Du Quoin, Illinois, at the age of 72.

== Notes ==
Illinois House of Representatives
Preceded by Terry Deering	Member of the Illinois House of Representatives from the 115th district 1993–1995	Succeeded by Mike Bost
