= Mike Bost =

American politician (born 1960)

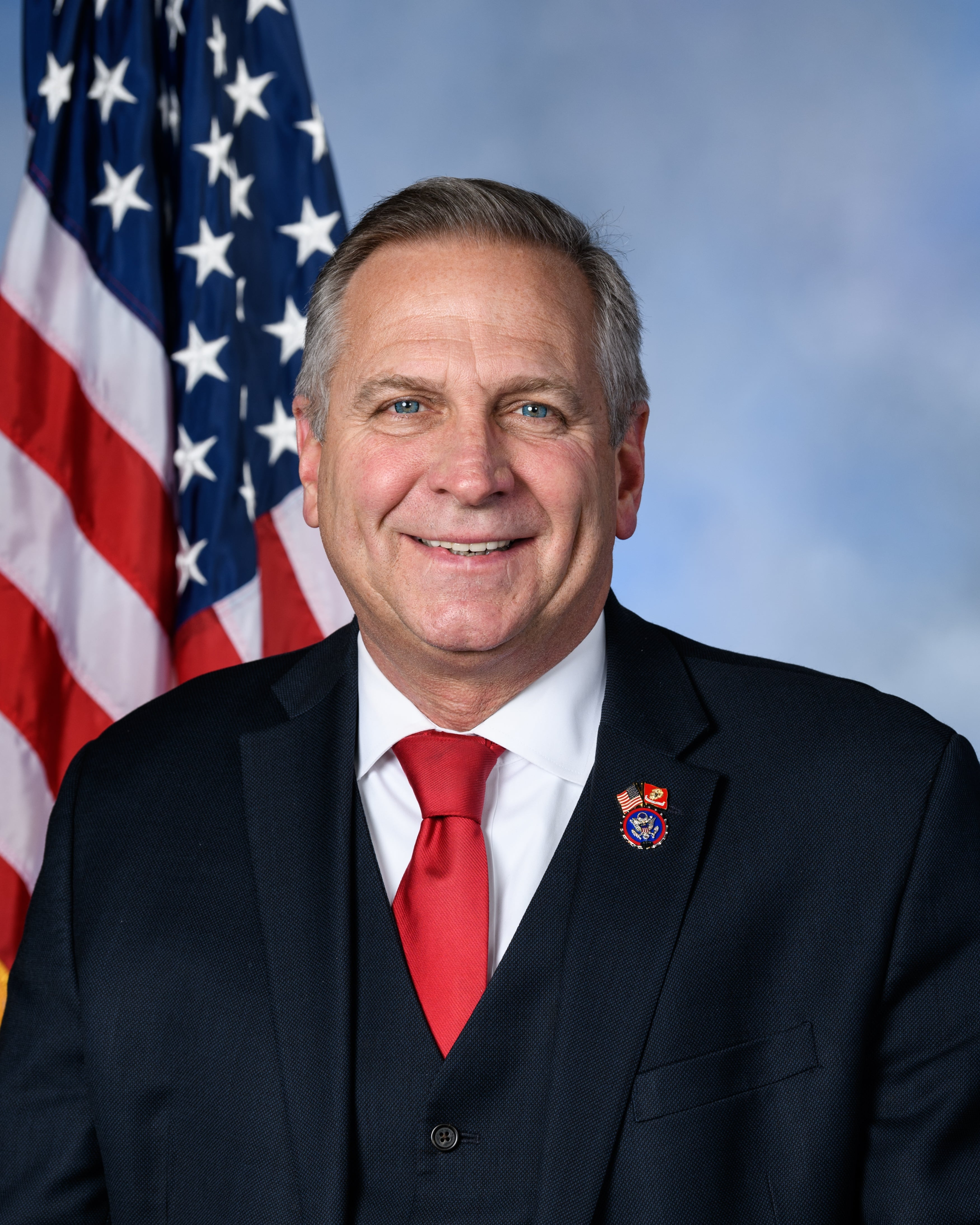
- Official portrait, 2021

Chair of the House Veterans' Affairs Committee
- Incumbent
- Assumed office January 3, 2023
- Preceded by: Mark Takano

Ranking Member of the House Veterans' Affairs Committee
- In office January 3, 2021 – January 3, 2023
- Preceded by: Phil Roe
- Succeeded by: Mark Takano

Member of the U.S. House of Representatives from Illinois's 12th district
- Incumbent
- Assumed office January 3, 2015
- Preceded by: William Enyart

Member of the Illinois House of Representatives from the 115th district
- In office January 11, 1995 – January 2, 2015
- Preceded by: Gerald Hawkins
- Succeeded by: Terri Bryant

Personal details
- Born: Michael Joseph Bost; December 30, 1960 (age 65) Murphysboro, Illinois, U.S.
- Party: Republican
- Spouse: Tracy Bost (m. 1980)
- Children: 3
- Website: House website Campaign website

Military service
- Branch/service: United States Marine Corps
- Years of service: 1979–1982
- Rank: Corporal
- Bost's voice Bost on legislation reimbursing veterans contributing to post-9/11 educational assistance. Recorded March 7, 2023

Michael Joseph Bost (/ˈbɔːst/ BAWST; born December 30, 1960) is an American politician serving as the U.S. representative for Illinois's 12th congressional district since 2015. Previously, Bost was a member of the Illinois House of Representatives, representing the 115th district from 1995 to 2015. Before entering politics, he was a firefighter. He is a member of the Republican Party.

Bost was first elected in 2014, defeating Democratic incumbent William Enyart.

Bost is a member of the moderate Republican Governance Group and Republican Main Street Partnership.

== Early life and career ==
Bost was raised Baptist and graduated from Murphysboro High School. He attended a firefighter academy program offered by the University of Illinois, later becoming a firefighter. Because the firefighter program isn't a college-level degree, he is one of two current Representatives to not have attended a college program leading to a college degree (the other being Lauren Boebert). He served in the United States Marine Corps from 1979 to 1982.

Bost ran his family's trucking business for ten years. Since 1989, he and his wife Tracy have owned and operated White House Salon in Murphysboro.

Bost was a member of the Jackson County Board from 1984 to 1988, the treasurer of Murphysboro Township from 1989 to 1992, and trustee of Murphysboro Township from 1993 to 1995, until his election to the Illinois House of Representatives.

== Illinois State Legislature ==
Bost was first elected to the Illinois House of Representatives in November 1994, having lost his first campaign in 1992. In his 1994 campaign against incumbent Gerald Hawkins, he was endorsed by the Chicago Tribune.

During the 2008 Republican Party presidential primaries, Bost worked on former U.S. Senator Fred Thompson's presidential campaign, serving as a congressional district chair for Illinois's 12th congressional district.

In May 2012, members of the Illinois House were given just 20 minutes to review and vote on a 200-page pension overhaul bill that had been revised at the last minute. Bost expressed his anger on the House floor, saying, "These damn bills that come out of here all the damn time...come out here at the last second, and I've got to try figure out how to vote for my people!...Enough! I feel like somebody trying to be released from Egypt! Let my people go!" An opponent ran ads focusing on Bost's anger, but many voters, according to NPR, "see his fury as well-placed." His rant was the runner-up spot on CNN's list of "Best Celebrity Flip-Outs of All-Time". He joked about his inclusion on the list, saying "I thought I was going to be No. 1", and later said he had been "angry at how legislators pushed a bill through and how Governor Pat Quinn was running Illinois."

In November 2013, Bost presented fellow U.S. Marine Archibald Mosley with Illinois House Resolution 706 for his lifetime accomplishments, including being among the first African-Americans to serve in the Marines. The presentation was part of an NAACP program.

After the 2014 elections, Bost resigned early from the House to take office in Congress. He was succeeded by Terri Bryant.

=== Committees ===
Bost served on the following state legislative committees:

- Appropriations-Higher Education
- Bio-Technology
- Higher Education
- Public Utilities

== U.S. House of Representatives ==
=== Elections ===
==== 2014 ====
In 2014 Bost ran for U.S. Congress in Illinois's 12th congressional district. He was unopposed in the Republican primary, and faced the incumbent, William Enyart, in the general election.

Illinois's largely agricultural 12th district was historically Democratic-leaning, but had been trending Republican, with President Obama having carried it by only 2 percentage points in 2012. Enyart was considered vulnerable as a freshman member in a competitive seat. Additionally, Democratic Governor Pat Quinn, who was running for reelection in 2014, was unpopular in the district. The Cook Political Report rated the race a "Toss Up" and the National Journal ranked the district the 21st most likely to flip Republican in 2014.

In a radio interview, Bost said some scientists believe in anthropogenic climate change while other scientists do not.

Bost said he ran because "the federal government has basically blown everything they are doing right now." He said he intended to fight for job growth and immigration reform. He challenged Enyart to as many as 12 debates. Bost was endorsed by the Illinois Chamber of Commerce.

Bost won the election with 53% of the vote to Enyart's 42%, with Green Party candidate Paula Bradshaw taking 6%. He won primarily by dominating the areas of the district outside the St. Louis suburbs, taking all but three of the district's 12 counties. He also benefited from the coattails of Bruce Rauner's successful run for governor; Rauner carried every county in the district.

After being elected to the House, Bost said he did not plan to acquire a second residence, but would sleep in his office while in Washington.

==== 2016 ====
Bost ran for reelection in 2016. He was unopposed in the Republican primary, and faced Democrat C.J. Baricevic and Green Party candidate Paula Bradshaw in the general election. Bost won the November 8 general election with 54% of the vote.

Bost was endorsed by the Illinois Education Association, Illinois's largest labor union. In its endorsement, the union cited Bost's, "strong record in support of public education in the Metro East and Southern Illinois."

==== 2018 ====
Bost ran for reelection in 2018. In the Republican primary, he defeated challenger Preston Nelson with 83.5% of the vote. In the general election, Bost defeated Democratic nominee Brendan Kelly with 51.8% of the vote to Kelly's 45.2%. Green Party candidate Randy Auxier took 3%.

==== 2020 ====
Bost won the Republican primary unopposed. In the 2020 general election, Bost won with 60.4% of the vote.

==== 2022 ====
Bost won the Republican primary unopposed. In the 2022 general election, Bost won with 75% of the vote.

==== 2024 ====
2024 GOP primary results Bost—80–90% Bost—70–80% Bost—60–70% Bost—50–60% Bailey—50–60% Bailey—60–70% Bailey—70–80% Bailey—80–90%

Bost was challenged in the Republican primary by former state senator and 2022 gubernatorial nominee Darren Bailey, making this his second challenge in a U.S. House primary. Bost won renomination with 51.4% of the vote to Bailey's 48.6%.

=== Tenure ===
Bost was sworn into office on January 6, 2015.

In November 2014, Bost described President Obama, his former colleague in the Illinois legislature, as a "fluke" and said that "nobody ever thought he was going to rise." He recalled a time when Obama, speaking to a group of reporters as Bost walked by, had said to them: "There you have it, one of the rich Republicans." Bost purportedly responded, "that just proves you don't know me at all." He said that was his last exchange with Obama.

After James Hodgkinson shot at GOP congressmen who were playing baseball in Virginia on June 14, 2017, injuring Steve Scalise, Bost said that his office had previously received phone calls from the attacker. "He's contacted us just about 10 times, on every issue," Bost said. "[He] was argumentative, but never threatening."

Bost is a member of the Republican Main Street Partnership, which described itself, as of 2015, as "a coalition of over 70 members... who stand for strong, conservative principles in economic and national security policy and believe in governing in a thoughtful and pragmatic manner". and the conservative Republican Study Committee.

At a March 2017 meeting with editors of the Southern Illinoisan, Bost said that he did not do "town halls" because they had become too combative. "You know the cleansing that the Orientals used to do where you'd put one person out in front and 900 people yell at them? That's not what we need. We need to have meetings with people that are productive." His use of the word "Orientals" made national headlines. Bost apologized, saying he had "used a poor choice of words." His spokesman said that Bost had been referring to public humiliation sessions during China's Cultural Revolution.

==== Farming ====
In April 2016, a Bost bill to change how the government defines farms and ranches as small businesses passed the House with bipartisan support.

==== Health care ====
At a March 2017 "telephone town hall," Bost spoke about health care with several constituents who criticized Obamacare. Bost expressed support for the new American Health Care Act, saying, "doing nothing is not an option." He promised the new bill did not portend a return to pre-Obama health care. "It's not intended to go back to what it was prior to the Affordable Care Act," Bost said. "We have to move forward because the system is collapsing." He also praised "plans to strip money from Planned Parenthood and shift it to local health departments that help with women's needs." On May 4, 2017, Bost voted for the act.

==== Tax reform ====
Bost voted for the Tax Cuts and Jobs Act of 2017, saying he believed the bill would enable businesses to compete globally and thereby improve the economy. The individual tax cuts expire in 2022. Bost wants to make them permanent.

In December 2017, Bost signed a letter requesting that two education-related portions of the Internal Revenue code, one providing tuition breaks and the other incentivizing employees "to accept tax-free educational assistance from employers," be left unchanged in the new tax bill. The letter pointed out that seven out of ten college students graduate with student loan debt, which "harms our economy because it prevents many young adults from buying a house, purchasing a car or saving for retirement."

==== LGBT rights ====
In 2015, Bost condemned the Supreme Court ruling in Obergefell v. Hodges, which held that same-sex marriage bans violated the constitution.

==== Israel-Palestine ====
Bost voted to provide Israel with support following the October 7 attacks.

==== Ukraine ====
In 2024, Bost voted against a $60 billion military aid package for Ukraine, with The Washington Post reporting that some of the funding would have supported defense jobs in his constituency.

=== Committee assignments ===
For the 119th Congress:

- Committee on Agriculture
  - Subcommittee on General Farm Commodities, Risk Management, and Credit
- Committee on Transportation and Infrastructure
  - Subcommittee on Highways and Transit
  - Subcommittee on Railroads, Pipelines, and Hazardous Materials
  - Subcommittee on Water Resources and Environment
- Committee on Veterans' Affairs (Chair)

=== Caucus memberships ===
- Republican Study Committee
- Republican Governance Group
- Republican Main Street Partnership
- Problem Solvers Caucus (former)
- Congressional Motorcycle Caucus
- Congressional Western Caucus

== Electoral history ==
Illinois 115th State House District General Election, 1992
Party	Candidate	Votes	%
Democratic	Gerald Hawkins	22,494	54.61
Republican	Mike Bost	18,700	45.39
Total votes		41,194	100.0

Illinois 115th State House District General Election, 1994
Party	Candidate	Votes	%
Republican	Mike Bost	17,004	56.21
Democratic	Gerald Hawkins (incumbent)	13,245	43.79
Total votes		30,249	100.0

Illinois 115th State House District General Election, 1996
Party	Candidate	Votes	%
Republican	Mike Bost (incumbent)	19,561	51.82
Democratic	John S. Rendleman	18,188	48.18
Total votes		37,749	100.0

Illinois 115th State House District General Election, 1998
Party	Candidate	Votes	%
Republican	Mike Bost (incumbent)	18,523	55.11
Democratic	Don Strom	15,087	44.89
Total votes		33,610	100.0

Illinois 115th State House District General Election, 2000
Party	Candidate	Votes	%
Republican	Mike Bost (incumbent)	24,137	62.70
Democratic	Robert L. Koehn	14,362	37.30
Total votes		38,499	100.0

Illinois 115th State House District General Election, 2002
Party	Candidate	Votes	%
Republican	Mike Bost (incumbent)	20,338	60.55
Democratic	Gerald Deering	11,102	33.05
Illinois Green Party	Rich Whitney	2,150	6.40
Total votes		33,590	100.0

Illinois 115th State House District General Election, 2004
Party	Candidate	Votes	%
Republican	Mike Bost (incumbent)	27,984	59.99
Democratic	Mic Middleton	14,804	31.74
Green	Rich Whitney	3,859	8.27
Total votes		46,647	100.0

Illinois 115th State House District General Election, 2006
Party	Candidate	Votes	%
Republican	Mike Bost (incumbent)	23,289	77.87
Green	Charlie Howe	6,620	22.13
Total votes		29,909	100.0

Illinois 115th State House District General Election, 2008
Party	Candidate	Votes	%
Republican	Mike Bost (incumbent)	26,506	57.54
Democratic	Cheryl Graff	16,515	35.85
Green	Charlie Howe	3,041	6.60
Total votes		46,062	100.0

Illinois 115th State House District General Election, 2010
Party	Candidate	Votes	%
Republican	Mike Bost (incumbent)	22,820	74.43
Green	Charlie Howe	7,839	25.57
Total votes		30,659	100.0

Illinois 115th State House District General Election, 2012
Party	Candidate	Votes	%
Republican	Mike Bost (incumbent)	37,192	100.0
Total votes		37,192	100.0

Illinois 12th Congressional District General Election, 2014
Party	Candidate	Votes	%
Republican	Mike Bost	110,038	52.46
Democratic	William L. "Bill" Enyart (incumbent)	87,860	41.89
Green	Paula Bradshaw	11,840	5.65
Total votes		209,738	100.0

Illinois 12th Congressional District General Election, 2016
Party	Candidate	Votes	%
Republican	Mike Bost (incumbent)	169,976	54.31
Democratic	Charles "C.J." Baricevic	124,246	39.69
Green	Paula Bradshaw	18,780	6.00
Total votes		313,002	100.0

Illinois 12th Congressional District Republican Primary, 2018
Party	Candidate	Votes	%
Republican	Mike Bost (incumbent)	31,658	83.50
Republican	Preston Nelson	6,258	16.50
Total votes		37,916	100.0

Illinois 12th Congressional District General Election, 2018
Party	Candidate	Votes	%
Republican	Mike Bost (incumbent)	134,884	51.57
Democratic	Brendan Kelly	118,724	45.39
Green	Randy Auxier	7,935	3.03
Total votes		261,543	100.0

Illinois's 12th congressional district, 2020
Party	Candidate	Votes	%	±%
Republican	Mike Bost (incumbent)	194,839	60.43	+8.86%
Democratic	Raymond Lenzi	127,577	39.57	−5.82%
Total votes		322,416	100.0	
Republican hold				

Illinois's 12th congressional district, 2022
Party	Candidate	Votes	%
Republican	Mike Bost (incumbent)	218,379	75.0
Democratic	Chip Markel	72,791	25.0
Write-in		1	0.0
Total votes		291,171	100.0

Illinois 12th Congressional District Republican Primary, 2024
Party	Candidate	Votes	%
Republican	Mike Bost (incumbent)	48,770	51.44
Republican	Darren Bailey	46,035	48.56
Total votes		94,805	100.0

Illinois's 12th congressional district, 2024
Party	Candidate	Votes	%
Republican	Mike Bost (incumbent)	272,754	74.2
Democratic	Brian Roberts	94,875	25.8
Total votes		367,629	100.0

== Personal life ==
Bost and his wife, Tracy, have three children, including Judge Steven Bost of Illinois's 1st Circuit, and 11 grandchildren. He has said that his political hero is John Alexander Logan, an Illinois Democrat who had switched parties when the Civil War began. "He was willing to break ranks to do what was right," Bost explained.

=== Legal trouble ===
In 1986, Bost's daughter required stitches after being bitten by a beagle after chasing it. Unsatisfied with authorities' lack of an immediate response, Bost drove to the dog's owner's home and shot the dog dead with a handgun while it was in its enclosure. He was arrested and charged with criminal damage to property and reckless misconduct in relation to the incident, but was acquitted at trial. In 2014, Bost joked to a reporter about the killing.

In 2006, authorities confronted Bost after he failed to report that his gun was stolen after it was used to threaten another man's life. He led authorities to his gun safe, which contained a bottle of whiskey and no gun.

In January, 2026, Bost claimed in a television interview that the federal government was not bound to the Fourth Amendment guarantee prohibiting warrantless searches and that ICE agents could enter civilian homes. When asked if the Federal government needed a warrant, Bost relented, "We'll see how they handle it.

U.S. House of Representatives
Preceded by William Enyart	Member of the U.S. House of Representatives from Illinois's 12th congressional district 2015–present	Incumbent
Preceded by Mark Takano	Chair of the House Veterans' Affairs Committee; 2023–present	Incumbent
Party political offices
Preceded by Rodney Davis	Chair of the Republican Main Street Caucus; 2021–2023; Served alongside: Don Bacon, Pete Stauber	Succeeded by Dusty Johnson
U.S. order of precedence (ceremonial)
Preceded by Don Beyer	United States representatives by seniority 129th	Succeeded by Brendan Boyle
