= Ann Callis =

American judge

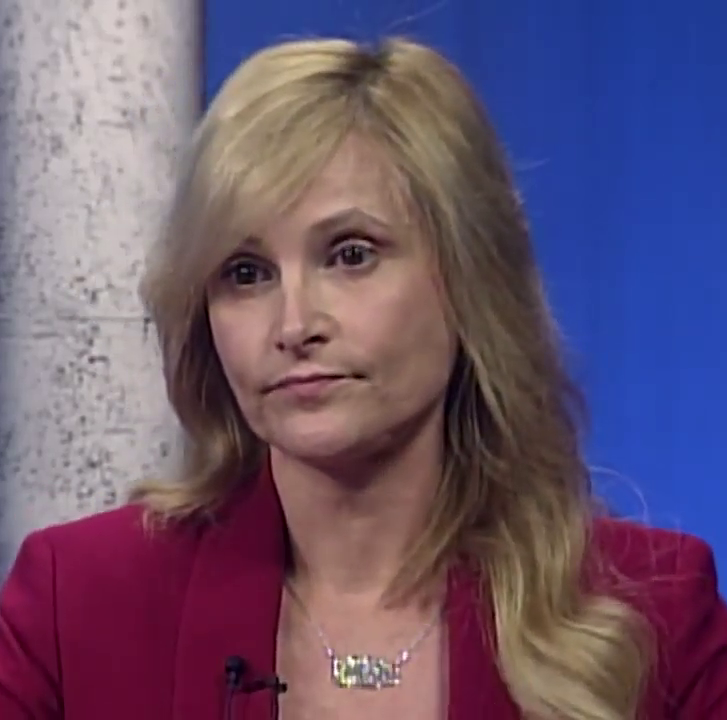

Chief Judge of the Illinois Third Judicial Circuit Court
- In office 2006 – 2013
- Succeeded by: David Hylla

Personal details
- Born: August 28, 1964 (age 62) Granite City, Illinois, US
- Party: Democratic
- Spouses: Robert Rongey (divorced); Jim Halloran
- Education: St. Louis University (BA, JD)
- Profession: Judge, lawyer

Ann Callis is a former chief judge of Illinois's Third Judicial Circuit. A member of the Democratic Party, she was the Democratic candidate to represent Illinois's 13th congressional district in the 2014 federal elections.

== Early life and education ==
Callis received both her bachelor's degree magna cum laude and her Juris Doctor from St. Louis University. Callis is a native of Granite City, Illinois and is the daughter of deceased attorney and Democratic Party activist Lance Callis.

== Judicial career ==
Callis began her legal career as a prosecutor in the state's attorney offices of Madison County and St. Clair County. Callis was sworn in as an associate judge to Illinois's Third Judicial Circuit in 1995. At the time of her selection for the court, she was the youngest of 21 candidates. In the same year, she was given the "lowest rating for legal ability among 152 judges in Illinois outside of Chicago" by an Illinois State Bar Association poll. Callis noted that she had not received any complaints about her performance, and the low rating reflected the fact that she had been on the bench only a few months and most lawyers had not appeared before her. According to the St. Louis Post-Dispatch, prior to Callis' appointment there were "months of reports she had the job locked up because of her influential father" and she "was dogged early in her career by allegations that she got to the bench because of her influential father." She was named a circuit judge in 1999, and chief judge in 2006.

As a judge, Callis was involved with the creation of the first Veterans’ Court in Illinois, which received the national 2010 Paul H. Chapman Award. The court is run by veterans and provides services to county veterans.

Callis also created mediation programs aimed at helping homeowners and lenders avoid mortgage foreclosures.

In a 2012 poll of lawyers, Callis was recommended for retention, with 83.64% of those responding saying Callis "meets requirements of office." Three other judges from the 3rd Judicial Circuit received higher scores than Callis. Her lowest score in the judicial evaluations, 82.63%, was in the category "impartiality." Her highest scores were 98.8 in "health" and 92.77 in "sensitivity."

== 2014 U.S. House campaign ==
Callis stepped down as a judge in 2013 in order to run for Congress in Illinois's 13th congressional district.

The Chicago Tribune endorsed Callis's Democratic primary competitor, George Gollin, writing: "Callis sticks to safe talking points, occasionally name-checking Durbin. Her answers to our survey are carefully scripted, heavy on promises to protect seniors and middle-class families without explaining what she'd actually do."

Callis won the Democratic primary on March 18, 2014. Callis lost to Republican incumbent Rodney L. Davis in the November 4, 2014, general election.

Callis was endorsed by Democratic senator Dick Durbin and the Democratic Congressional Campaign Committee. Her campaign was supported by Nancy Pelosi, who appeared at "When Women Succeed, America Succeeds, Women on a Roll" bus tour.

Callis was endorsed by the national Veteran's Vision publication. She was also endorsed by the National Committee to Preserve Social Security and Medicare. Callis was endorsed by EMILY's List, who called her a "perfect foil" for incumbent Rodney Davis.

In October 2014, Roll Call reported that the Democratic Congressional Campaign Committee would be cutting back initially planned ads supporting Callis in the second-to-last-week of the cycle, part of a larger series of cuts that "serve as a signal the party does not see a path to victory for these candidates or races."

== Issue positions ==
Callis supports the Affordable Care Act, saying: "We can't just shut down our government and cost our economy billions of dollars because we disagree with a law." When asked if she supported single-payer health care, Callis said: "I think we need to wait and see what the Affordable Healthcare Act does."

== Personal life ==
Callis has two children: a son who is an Airborne Ranger, Captain and Company Commander with the 82nd Airborne Division, and a daughter who is an English Second Language teacher.
