= William Enyart =

American politician (born 1949)

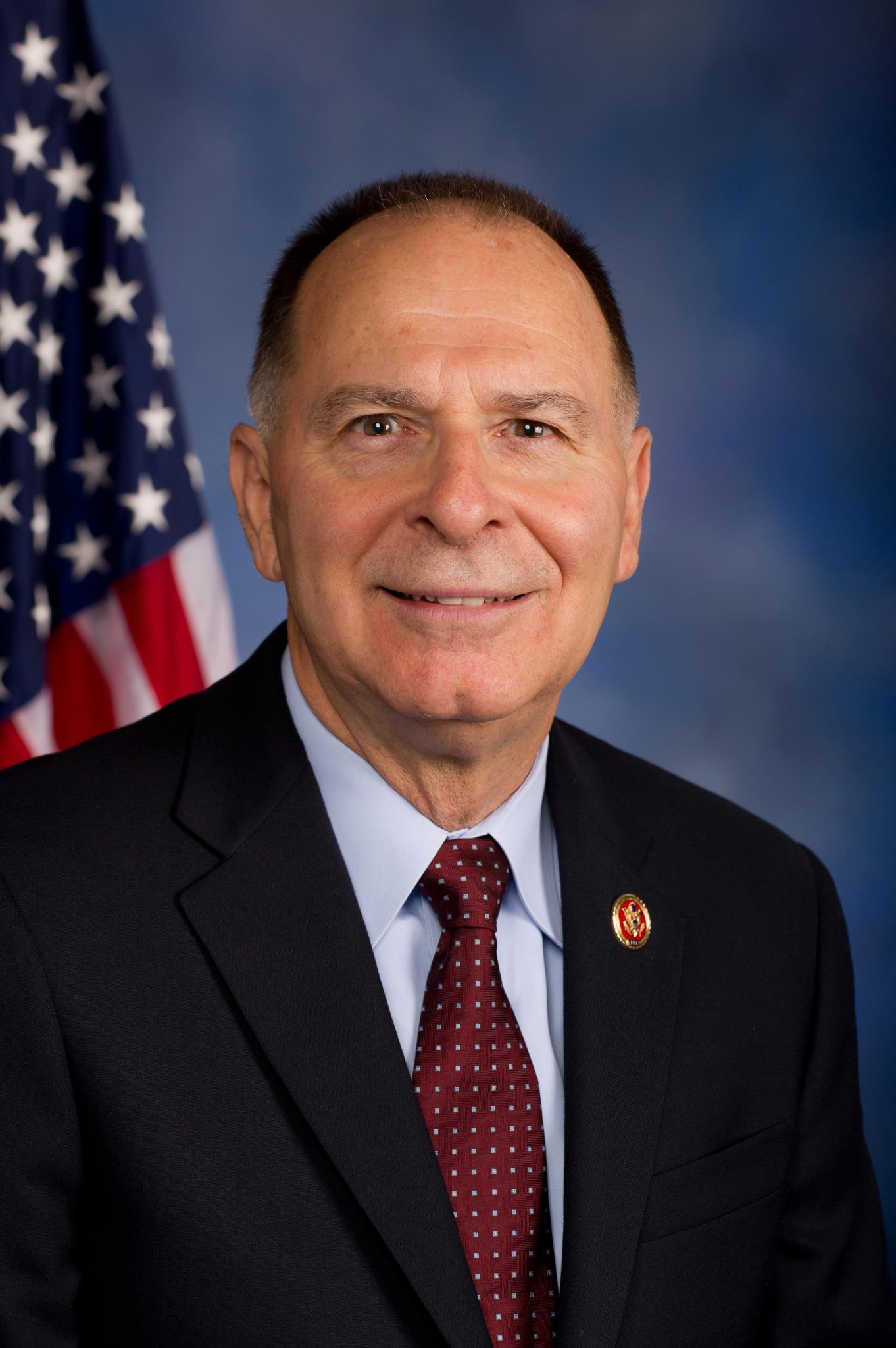
- Official portrait, 2013

Member of the U.S. House of Representatives from Illinois's 12th district
- In office January 3, 2013 – January 3, 2015
- Preceded by: Jerry Costello
- Succeeded by: Mike Bost

37th Adjutant General of Illinois
- In office September 1, 2007 – June 7, 2012
- Preceded by: Randal E. Thomas
- Succeeded by: Dennis Celletti

Personal details
- Born: William Lee Enyart Jr. September 22, 1949 (age 77) Pensacola, Florida, U.S.
- Party: Democratic
- Spouse: Annette Eckert
- Children: 3
- Education: Southern Illinois University, Edwardsville (BA); Southern Illinois University, Carbondale (JD); United States Army War College (MA)
- Website: Official website

Military service
- Branch/service: United States Air Force
- Years of service: 1969–2012
- Rank: Major General
- Unit: Illinois National Guard

William Lee Enyart Jr. (/ˈɛnjɑːrt/; born September 22, 1949) is an American general and politician who served as the U.S. representative for Illinois's 12th congressional district. A member of the Democratic Party, Enyart was elected on November 6, 2012, and assumed office on January 3, 2013. Enyart is a former attorney and Adjutant General of Illinois.

Enyart ran for re-election to Congress in 2014. He faced Republican Mike Bost in the general election. Enyart was viewed as one of the most vulnerable freshman Democrats. Enyart lost to Bost on November 4, 2014.

== Early life and education ==
Enyart earned his Bachelor of Arts in journalism and political science in 1974 from Southern Illinois University Edwardsville and his Juris Doctor from Southern Illinois University School of Law in 1979. In 2000, Enyart graduated from the United States Army War College with a Master of Science in Strategic Studies. In 2012, Enyart was awarded an honorary degree from Lindenwood University in Belleville, Illinois. He is married to Annette Enyart.

== Military career ==
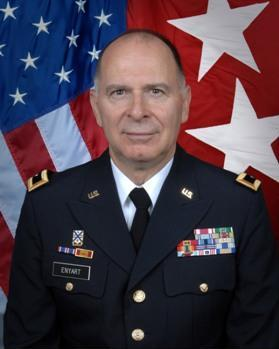
Portrait of Enyart as a major general

Enyart served in the U.S. Air Force before joining the Illinois Army National Guard in 1982 as a JAG officer. Holding the rank of major general, he was appointed to lead the National Guard and the Illinois Department of Military Affairs as the 37th Adjutant General in 2007, and was reappointed in 2009 and in 2011. As adjutant general, Enyart led the largest deployment of the Illinois National Guard since WWII and Illinois's response to the 2011 Mississippi River floods. He retired from the military in 2012. In 2012, Enyart received the Commander's Cross of the Order of Merit of the Republic of Poland from Bronislaw Komorowski, the president of Poland.

== U.S. House of Representatives ==
=== Elections ===
==== 2012 ====
On June 23, 2012, Enyart was selected as the Democratic nominee for the U.S. House of Representatives Illinois's 12th congressional district after the original nominee, Brad Harriman, withdrew from the race for health reasons. Enyart defeated Republican nominee Jason Plummer 52% to 43%.

During the election, Plummer stated that Enyart and his wife, a retired circuit judge, receive a total of three taxpayer-funded pensions. The St. Louis Post-Dispatch reported that while Enyart did not currently receive a pension, his wife does collect on three taxpayer pension funds.

==== 2014 ====
Enyart ran for re-election in 2014. He ran unopposed in the Democratic primary. He faced state Representative Mike Bost in the general election on 4 November. Enyart was a member of the Democratic Congressional Campaign Committee's Frontline Program, which is designed to help protect vulnerable Democratic incumbents.

Bost defeated Enyart in the general election, 53% to 42%. Enyart was swamped in most of the district outside his base in the St. Louis suburbs; he only carried three of the district's 12 counties.

=== Committee assignments ===
- Committee on Agriculture
  - Subcommittee on General Farm Commodities and Risk Management
  - Subcommittee on Livestock, Rural Development, and Credit
- Committee on Armed Services
  - Subcommittee on Tactical Air and Land Forces
  - Subcommittee on Readiness

== Political positions ==
=== Immigration ===
Enyart supports the DREAM Act, particularly a provision that would give immigrants who join the military an expedited path to citizenship.

=== Health care ===
Enyart is against repealing the Patient Protection and Affordable Care Act. Speaking about the health care law, Enyart said "Now are there problems with it? Of course there are problems with it. Let’s not throw the baby out with the bathwater. Let’s change the things that are problems and move on." In an analysis of 2014 campaign websites, The Hill found that Enyart is among six congressional Democrats whose websites do not mention the Affordable Care Act, noting that "Most Democrats in competitive elections are seeking to avoid the topic, opting not to tout the controversial law on their campaign websites."

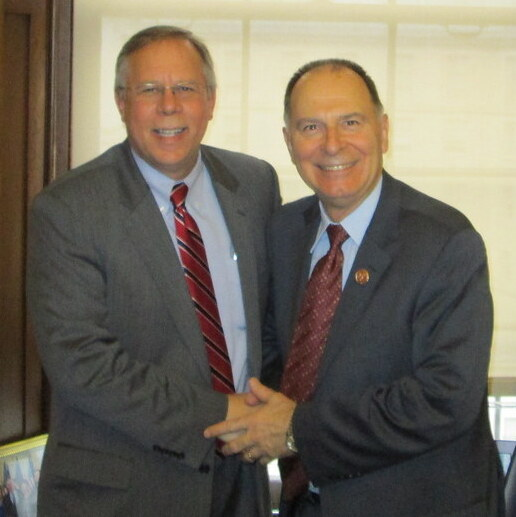
Enyart with Director of the Illinois Department of Agriculture Robert Flider on February 5, 2014

=== Taxes ===
Enyart has stated his support for raising taxes on higher income individuals. Enyart has said "there is class warfare."

=== Women's issues ===
Enyart voted for the Violence Against Women Act.

=== Privacy issues ===
Enyart co-sponsored the Cyber Intelligence Sharing and Protection Act (CISPA), which would have allowed for the sharing of Internet traffic information between the U.S. government and technology and manufacturing companies for cybersecurity purposes. CISPA passed in the House but was not passed by the U.S. Senate. President Obama's advisers argued that the bill lacked confidentiality and civil liberties safeguards.

Enyart co-sponsored the Preserving American Privacy Act, which would have required federal agencies that used drones domestically to minimize the collection of personally identifiable information. The bill did not make it out of committee.

Enyart voted against a proposed amendment by Justin Amash (R-MI) that would have defunded warrantless domestic surveillance operations by the National Security Agency.

=== Veterans' issues ===
Enyart introduced the Veterans Backlog Reduction Act, which would provide provisional benefits to veterans who have requested benefits from the VA and been left waiting for more than 125 days.

In October 2013, Enyart was the lone member of Congress to vote against a bill that would have restored chaplain services to military personnel in the wake of the government shutdown of 2013. Enyart defended his vote, calling the measure "an absolutely phony, feel-good bill that had nothing to do with reality," further noting that the bill provided no way to pay the chaplains if they resumed their duties.

=== National security ===
Enyart voted in favor of proposed amendments by Adam Smith (D-WA) that would have eliminated indefinite detention for any individual held in the United States and provided a framework to close the detention facility at Guantanamo Bay, Cuba, by December 1, 2014.

During congressional testimony on September 30, 2025 Enyart stated "It took a generation for the [National] Guard to recover from the stain of guardsmen shooting and killing students at Kent State. We're one trigger pull away from another such tragedy. Don't let it happen. National Guard forces are for a real emergency, not a Band-Aid for long-standing problems that need a long-term solution. Thank you."

=== Federal budget ===
Enyart voted for the No Budget, No Pay Act of 2013, which temporarily suspended the United States debt ceiling and placed temporary restrictions on congressional salaries.

== Electoral history ==
=== 2012 general election ===
Illinois' 12th congressional district election results, 2012
Party	Candidate	Votes	%
Democratic	William Enyart	157,000	51.7
Republican	Jason Plummer	129,902	42.7
Green	Paula Bradshaw	17,045	5.6
Write-in	Shon-Tiyon Horton	2	0.0
Total votes		303,947	100

=== 2014 general election ===
Illinois's 12th Congressional District, 2014
Party	Candidate	Votes	%
Republican	Mike Bost	110,038	52.46
Democratic	William Enyart (Incumbent)	87,860	41.89
Green	Paula Bradshaw	11,840	5.65
Total votes		209,738	100
Republican gain from Democratic			

U.S. House of Representatives
Preceded by Jerry Costello	Member of the U.S. House of Representatives from Illinois's 12th congressional district 2013–2015	Succeeded by Mike Bost
U.S. order of precedence (ceremonial)
Preceded by Joe Walsh as Former U.S. Representative	Order of precedence of the United States as Former U.S. Representative	Succeeded by Marie Newman as Former U.S. Representative
