= 2012 United States House of Representatives elections in Illinois =

- November 6, 2012

All 18 Illinois seats to the United States House of Representatives
	Majority party	Minority party
Party	Democratic	Republican
Last election	8	11
Seats won	12	6
Seat change	▲4	▼5
Popular vote	2,799,570	2,002,848
Percentage	57.07%	40.83%
Swing	▲6.31%	▼5.70%

Democratic hold Democratic gain
Republican hold
Democratic
40–50%
50–60%
60–70%
70–80%
80–90%
Republican
40–50%
50–60%
60–70%
70–80%
80–90%

The 2012 United States House of Representatives elections in Illinois was held on Tuesday, November 6, to elect the 18 U.S. representatives from the state, one from each of the state's 18 congressional districts, a loss of one seat following the 2010 United States census. The elections coincided with the elections of other federal and state offices, including a quadrennial presidential election. Primary elections were held on March 20, 2012.

Republicans struggled after a strong showing in 2010, losing a total of five seats, one via redistricting, and four via losses by incumbents. Joe Walsh, Bob Dold, Judy Biggert, and Bobby Schilling were all defeated in their bids for re-election. Walsh, Dold, and Schilling had all been elected during the wave year of 2010.

== Redistricting ==
A redistricting bill was introduced to the Illinois General Assembly by members of the Democratic Party in May 2011. Although Representatives are not required to live within their districts, the new map drew the homes of at least five Republican incumbents into districts where they would have to run against other Republicans, and others into districts which strongly favor Democrats.

After an amendment which modified the 13th and 15th districts was passed with Republican support, the new map was passed by the Illinois House of Representatives on May 30, 2011 and the Senate on May 31. Governor Pat Quinn, a Democrat, signed the map into law on June 24. Republican members of the congressional delegation planned to mount a legal challenge.

== Overview ==
United States House of Representatives elections in Illinois, 2012
Party	Votes	Percentage	Seats before	Seats after	+/–
Democratic	2,799,570	57.07%	8	12	+4
Republican	2,002,848	40.83%	11	6	-5
Others	102,826	2.16%	0	0	-
Totals	4,905,244	100.00%	19	18	-1

== District 1 ==
2012 Illinois's 1st congressional district election
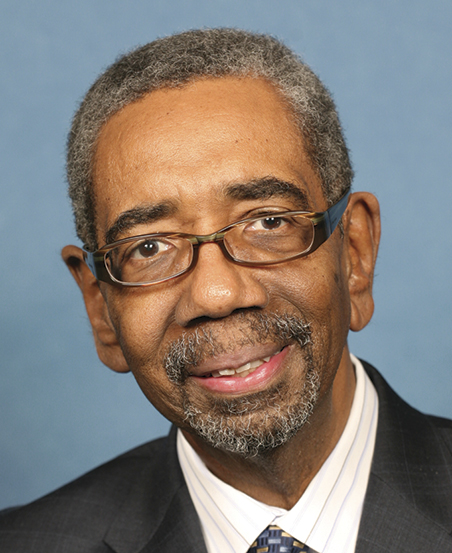

Nominee	Bobby Rush	Donald Peloquin
Party	Democratic	Republican
Popular vote	236,854	83,989
Percentage	73.8%	26.2%
- County results Rush: 80–90% Peloquin: 70–80%
U.S. Representative before election
Bobby Rush
Democratic
Elected U.S. Representative
Bobby Rush
Democratic

The 1st district, which had been represented by Democrat Bobby Rush since 1993, had seen a decline in population and so now extends into the Chicago suburbs and rural areas of Will County.

=== Democratic primary ===
==== Candidates ====
===== Nominee =====
- Bobby Rush, incumbent U.S. representative

===== Eliminated in primary =====
- Harold Bailey
- Raymond Lodato, lecturer in public policy at the University of Chicago
- Clifford Russell Jr., police officer
- Jordan Sims, political commentator for an online newspaper
- Fred Smith, program director for a youth care agency

==== Endorsements ====
Fred Smith

Newspapers

- Chicago Tribune

==== Primary results ====
Democratic primary results
Party	Candidate	Votes	%
Democratic	Bobby Rush (incumbent)	64,533	83.9
Democratic	Raymond Lodato	3,210	4.2
Democratic	Harold Bailey	2,598	3.4
Democratic	Clifford Russell, Jr.	2,412	3.1
Democratic	Fred Smith	2,232	2.9
Democratic	Jordan Sims	1,980	2.6
Total votes		76,965	100.0

=== Republican primary ===
==== Candidates ====
===== Nominee =====
- Donald Peloquin, mayor of Blue Island

===== Eliminated in primary =====
- Frederick Collins, police officer and 2010 candidate for Cook County sheriff
- Jimmy Lee Tillman II, producer

==== Endorsements ====
Donald Peloquin

Newspapers

- Chicago Tribune

==== Primary results ====
Republican primary results
Party	Candidate	Votes	%
Republican	Donald Peloquin	16,355	69.2
Republican	Frederick Collins	5,773	24.4
Republican	Jimmy Lee Tillman II	1,501	6.4
Total votes		23,629	100.0

=== General election ===
==== Endorsements ====
Bobby Rush (D)

Labor unions

- AFL-CIO
- National Association of Letter Carriers
- United Steelworkers

Organizations

- Humane Society of the United States
- Planned Parenthood Action Fund
- Sierra Club
Donald Peloquin (R)

Newspapers

- Chicago Tribune

==== Predictions ====
Source	Ranking	As of
The Cook Political Report	Safe D	November 5, 2012
Rothenberg	Safe D	November 2, 2012
Roll Call	Safe D	November 4, 2012
Sabato's Crystal Ball	Safe D	November 5, 2012
NY Times	Safe D	November 4, 2012
RCP	Safe D	November 4, 2012
The Hill	Safe D	November 4, 2012

==== Results ====
Illinois's 1st congressional district, 2012
Party	Candidate	Votes	%
Democratic	Bobby Rush (incumbent)	236,854	73.8
Republican	Donald Peloquin	83,989	26.2
Independent	John Hawkins (write-in)	1	0.0
Total votes		320,844	100.0
Democratic hold			

== District 2 ==
2012 Illinois's 2nd congressional district election
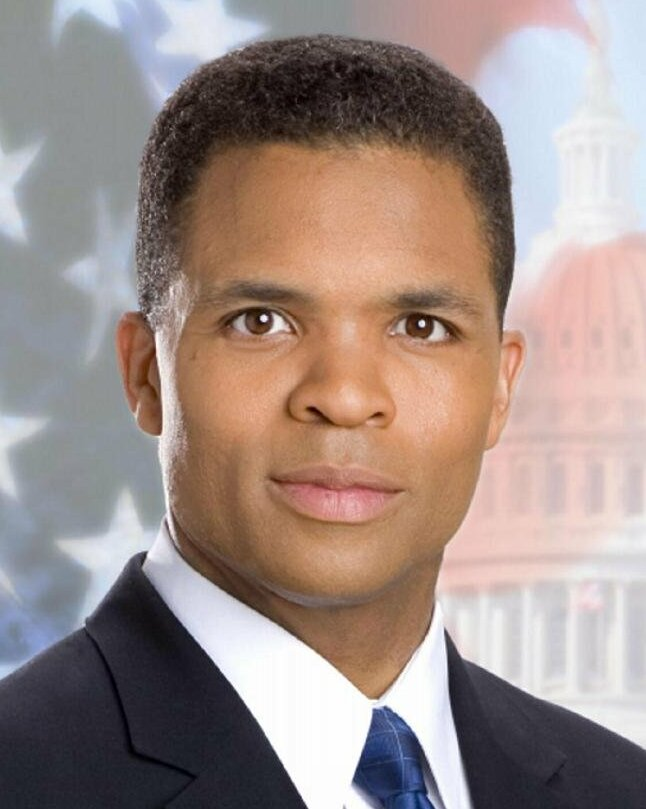

Nominee	Jesse Jackson, Jr.	Brian Woodworth	Marcus Lewis
Party	Democratic	Republican	Independent
Popular vote	188,303	69,115	40,006
Percentage	63.3%	23.3%	13.4%
- County results Jackson: 70–80% Woodworth: 50–60% 60–70%
U.S. Representative before election
Jesse Jackson, Jr.
Democratic
Elected U.S. Representative
Jesse Jackson, Jr.
(did not take seat)
Democratic

The new 2nd district stretches from Kankakee County, through Will County and to Chicago. Democrat Jesse Jackson, Jr., who had represented the 2nd district since 1999, sought re-election.

=== Democratic primary ===
==== Candidates ====
===== Nominee =====
- Jesse Jackson Jr., incumbent U.S. representative

===== Eliminated in primary =====
- Debbie Halvorson, former U.S. representative

==== Endorsements ====
Jesse Jackson Jr.

Newspapers

- Chicago Tribune

==== Polling ====
Poll source	Date(s) administered	Sample size	Margin of error	Jesse Jackson, Jr.	Debbie Halvorson	Undecided
We Ask America	February 21, 2012	1,294	± 2.7%	54%	32%	14%

==== Primary results ====
Democratic primary results
Party	Candidate	Votes	%
Democratic	Jesse Jackson, Jr. (incumbent)	56,109	71.2
Democratic	Debbie Halvorson	22,672	28.8
Total votes		78,781	100.0

=== Republican primary ===
Republican Adam Kinzinger, who was first elected to represent the 11th district in 2010 and now lives in the 2nd district, sought re-election in the 16th district.

==== Candidates ====
===== Nominee =====
- Brian Woodworth, associate professor at Olivet Nazarene University

===== Eliminated in primary =====
- James Taylor Sr., newspaper publisher

===== Declined =====
- Adam Kinzinger, incumbent U.S. representative for the 11th district

==== Endorsements ====
Brian Woodworth

Newspapers

- Chicago Tribune

==== Primary results ====
Republican primary results
Party	Candidate	Votes	%
Republican	Brian Woodworth	11,123	63.7
Republican	James Taylor, Sr.	6,347	36.3
Total votes		17,470	100.0

=== Independents ===
- Marcus Lewis, postal worker

=== General election ===
==== Endorsements ====
Jesse Jackson, Jr. (D)

Labor unions

- AFL-CIO
- National Association of Letter Carriers
- National Education Association
- United Steelworkers

Organizations

- Humane Society of the United States
- Planned Parenthood Action Fund
- Sierra Club

==== Polling ====
Poll source	Date(s) administered	Sample size	Margin of error	Jesse Jackson, Jr. (D)	Brian Woodworth (R)	Marcus Lewis (I)	Undecided
We Ask America	October 21, 2012	819	± 3.5%	58%	27%	15%	—

==== Predictions ====
Source	Ranking	As of
The Cook Political Report	Safe D	November 5, 2012
Rothenberg	Safe D	November 2, 2012
Roll Call	Safe D	November 4, 2012
Sabato's Crystal Ball	Safe D	November 5, 2012
NY Times	Safe D	November 4, 2012
RCP	Safe D	November 4, 2012
The Hill	Safe D	November 4, 2012

==== Results ====
Illinois's 2nd congressional district, 2012
Party	Candidate	Votes	%
Democratic	Jesse Jackson, Jr. (incumbent)	188,303	63.3
Republican	Brian Woodworth	69,115	23.2
Independent	Marcus Lewis	40,006	13.4
Independent	Anthony W. Williams (write-in)	288	0.1
Total votes		297,712	100.0
Democratic hold			

==== Aftermath ====
Jesse Jackson, Jr. resigned his seat in the 112th Congress on November 21, 2012, and also resigned his seat in the 113th Congress on the same day. As a result, no one was seated in the 113th Congress for the 2nd congressional district, and a special election was called for April, 2013, to fill the vacancy.

== District 3 ==
2012 Illinois's 3rd congressional district election
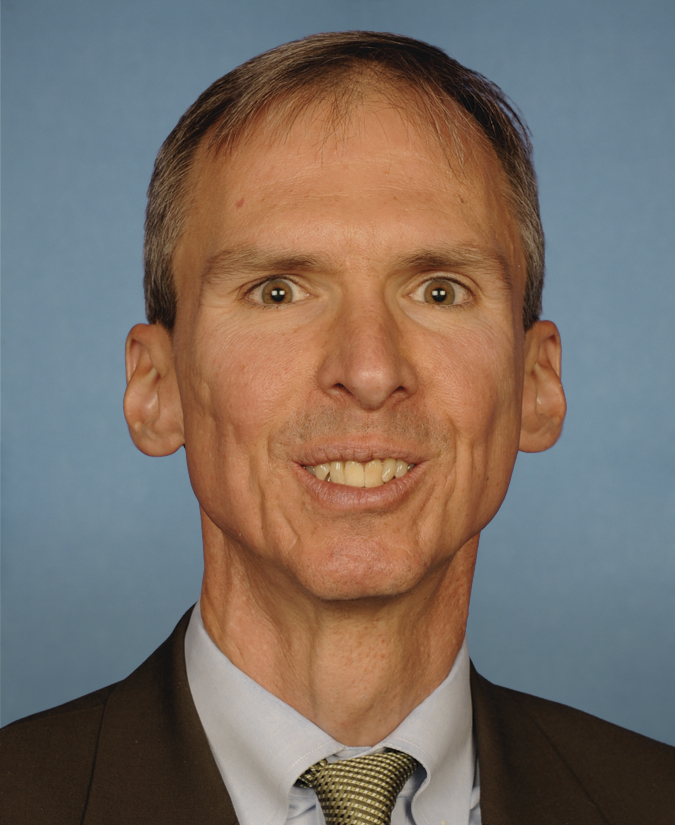

Nominee	Dan Lipinski	Richard Grabowski
Party	Democratic	Republican
Popular vote	168,738	77,653
Percentage	68.5%	31.5%
- County results Lipinski: 50–60% 70–80%
U.S. Representative before election
Dan Lipinski
Democratic
Elected U.S. Representative
Dan Lipinski
Democratic

The 3rd district, which had been represented by Democrat Dan Lipinski since 2005, now extends to Bridgeport, Chicago and Lockport, Will County. Lipinski sought re-election.

=== Democratic primary ===
Insurance executive and health care activist John Atkinson was expected to challenge incumbent Lipinski, and raised over $535,000 in the first quarter of 2011, but no longer lives in Lipinski's district. Atkinson had considered instead running in the 11th district, but suspended his campaign on June 14, 2011.

==== Candidates ====
===== Nominee =====
- Dan Lipinski, incumbent U.S. representative

===== Eliminated in primary =====
- Farah Baqai, police officer

===== Withdrawn =====
- John Atkinson, Insurance executive and health care activist

==== Endorsements ====
Dan Lipinski

Newspapers

- Chicago Tribune

==== Primary results ====
Democratic primary results
Party	Candidate	Votes	%
Democratic	Dan Lipinski (incumbent)	44,532	87.3
Democratic	Farah Baqai	6,463	12.7
Total votes		50,995	100.0

=== Republican primary ===
==== Candidates ====
===== Nominee =====
- Richard Grabowski, manufacturing company supervisor

===== Eliminated in primary =====
- Jim Falvey, attorney
- Arthur J. Jones, insurance sales representative

==== Endorsements ====
Richard Grabowski

Newspapers

- Chicago Tribune

==== Primary results ====
Republican primary results
Party	Candidate	Votes	%
Republican	Richard Grabowski	20,895	59.3
Republican	Jim Falvey	10,449	29.7
Republican	Arthur J. Jones	3,861	11.0
Total votes		35,205	100.0

=== General election ===
==== Endorsements ====
Dan Lipinsk (D)

Labor unions

- AFL-CIO
- National Association of Letter Carriers
- United Steelworkers

Organizations

- Humane Society of the United States
- Sierra Club

Newspapers

- Chicago Tribune

==== Predictions ====
Source	Ranking	As of
The Cook Political Report	Safe D	November 5, 2012
Rothenberg	Safe D	November 2, 2012
Roll Call	Safe D	November 4, 2012
Sabato's Crystal Ball	Safe D	November 5, 2012
NY Times	Safe D	November 4, 2012
RCP	Safe D	November 4, 2012
The Hill	Safe D	November 4, 2012

==== Results ====
Illinois's 3rd congressional district, 2012
Party	Candidate	Votes	%
Democratic	Dan Lipinski (incumbent)	168,738	68.5
Republican	Richard Grabowski	77,653	31.5
Independent	Laura Anderson (write-in)	7	0.0
Total votes		246,398	100.0
Democratic hold			

== District 4 ==
2012 Illinois's 4th congressional district election
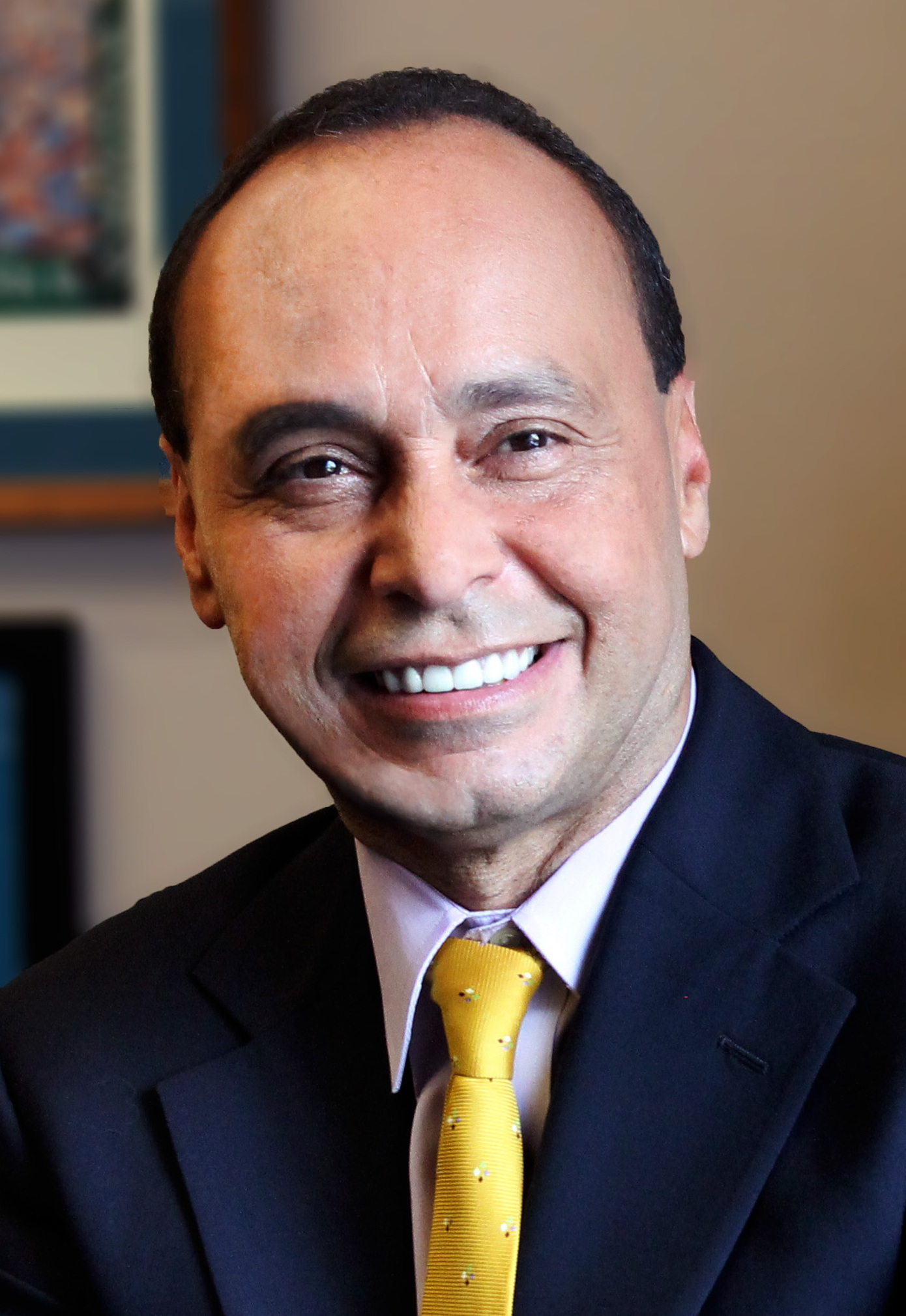

Nominee	Luis Gutiérrez	Hector Concepción
Party	Democratic	Republican
Popular vote	133,226	27,279
Percentage	83.0%	17.0%
- County results Gutierrez: 80–90%
U.S. Representative before election
Luis Gutiérrez
Democratic
Elected U.S. Representative
Luis Gutiérrez
Democratic

The 4th district, which had been represented by Democrat Luis Gutiérrez since 1993, was extended to incorporate Gutiérrez's new home in Portage Park.

=== Democratic primary ===
==== Candidates ====
===== Nominee =====
- Luis Gutiérrez, incumbent U.S. representative

===== Eliminated in primary =====
- Jorge Zavala, teacher with the City Colleges of Chicago

==== Primary results ====
Democratic primary results
Party	Candidate	Votes	%
Democratic	Luis Gutiérrez (incumbent)	30,908	100.0
Democratic	Jorge Zavala (write-in)	6	0.0
Total votes		30,914	100.0

=== Republican primary ===
Héctor Concepción, a former director of the Puerto Rican chamber of commerce, had been removed from the ballot by the Illinois Board of Elections in January 2012, but subsequently refiled and challenged Gutiérrez as the Republican nominee in the general election.

==== Candidates ====
===== Nominee =====
- Héctor Concepción, former director of the Puerto Rican chamber of commerce

==== Primary results ====
Republican primary results
Party	Candidate	Votes	%
Republican	Héctor Concepción (write-in)	10	100.0

=== General election ===
==== Endorsements ====
Luis Gutiérrez (D)

Labor unions

- AFL-CIO
- National Association of Letter Carriers
- United Steelworkers

Organizations

- Humane Society of the United States
- National Organization for Women
- Planned Parenthood Action Fund
- Sierra Club

==== Predictions ====
Source	Ranking	As of
The Cook Political Report	Safe D	November 5, 2012
Rothenberg	Safe D	November 2, 2012
Roll Call	Safe D	November 4, 2012
Sabato's Crystal Ball	Safe D	November 5, 2012
NY Times	Safe D	November 4, 2012
RCP	Safe D	November 4, 2012
The Hill	Safe D	November 4, 2012

==== Results ====
Illinois's 4th congressional district, 2012
Party	Candidate	Votes	%
Democratic	Luis Gutiérrez (incumbent)	133,226	83.0
Republican	Héctor Concepción	27,279	17.0
Independent	Ymelda Viramontes	4	0.0
Total votes		160,509	100.0
Democratic hold			

== District 5 ==
2012 Illinois's 5th congressional district election
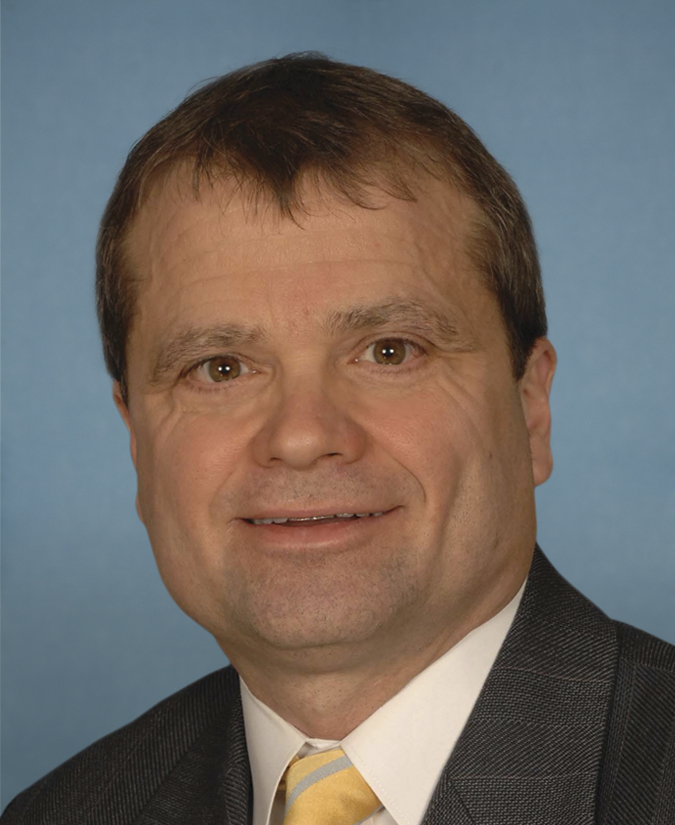

Nominee	Mike Quigley	Dan Schmitt	Nancy Wade
Party	Democratic	Republican	Green
Popular vote	177,729	77,289	15,359
Percentage	65.7%	28.6%	5.7%
- County results Quigley: 60–70% Schmitt: 50–60%
U.S. Representative before election
Mike Quigley
Democratic
Elected U.S. Representative
Mike Quigley
Democratic

The 5th district, which had been represented by Democrat Mike Quigley since 2009, was redrawn to include Franklin Park, Elmwood Park, Hinsdale, Oak Brook, River Grove, Schiller Park and parts of Melrose Park, Stone Park and the North Side of Chicago. Quigley sought re-election.

=== Democratic primary ===
==== Candidates ====
===== Nominee =====
- Mike Quigley, incumbent U.S. representative

==== Primary results ====
Democratic primary results
Party	Candidate	Votes	%
Democratic	Mike Quigley (incumbent)	37,967	100.0
Total votes		37,967	100.0

=== Republican primary ===
==== Candidates ====
===== Nominee =====
- Dan Schmitt, self-employed

==== Primary results ====
Republican primary results
Party	Candidate	Votes	%
Republican	Dan Schmitt	23,940	100.0
Total votes		23,940	100.0

=== Green primary ===
==== Candidates ====
===== Nominee =====
- Nancy Wade, community activist

=== General election ===
==== Endorsements ====
Mike Quigley (D)

Labor unions

- AFL-CIO
- National Association of Letter Carriers
- United Steelworkers

Organizations

- Humane Society of the United States
- NARAL Pro-Choice America
- Planned Parenthood Action Fund
- Sierra Club

Newspapers

- Chicago Tribune

==== Predictions ====
Source	Ranking	As of
The Cook Political Report	Safe D	November 5, 2012
Rothenberg	Safe D	November 2, 2012
Roll Call	Safe D	November 4, 2012
Sabato's Crystal Ball	Safe D	November 5, 2012
NY Times	Safe D	November 4, 2012
RCP	Safe D	November 4, 2012
The Hill	Safe D	November 4, 2012

==== Results ====
Illinois's 5th congressional district, 2012
Party	Candidate	Votes	%
Democratic	Mike Quigley (incumbent)	177,729	65.7
Republican	Dan Schmitt	77,289	28.6
Green	Nancy Wade	15,359	5.7
Total votes		270,377	100.0
Democratic hold			

== District 6 ==
2012 Illinois's 6th congressional district election
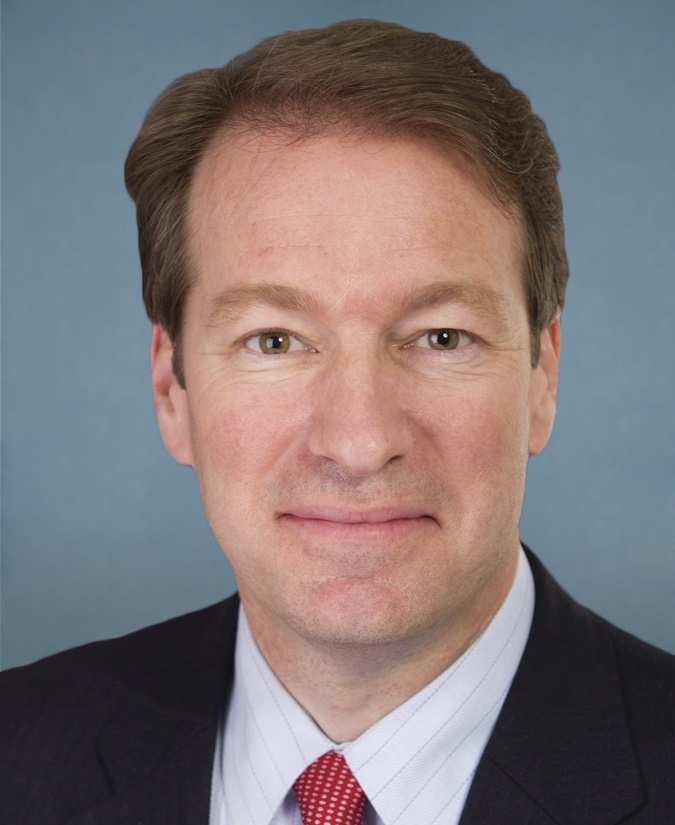

Nominee	Peter Roskam	Leslie Coolidge
Party	Republican	Democratic
Popular vote	193,138	132,991
Percentage	59.2%	40.8%
- County results Roskam: 50–60% 60–70%
U.S. Representative before election
Peter Roskam
Republican
Elected U.S. Representative
Peter Roskam
Republican

The 6th district, a DuPage Republican Votesink, which had been represented by Republican Peter Roskam since 2007, is one of two Chicagoland districts which were expected to remain strongly favorable to Republicans, although it has been redrawn to include Algonquin, Barrington, Cary, Downers Grove, Glen Ellyn, Lake in the Hills, Lake Zurich, Palatine, South Elgin, West Chicago, Westmont and Wheaton.

=== Republican primary ===
==== Candidates ====
===== Nominee =====
- Peter Roskam, incumbent U.S. representative

==== Primary results ====
Republican primary results
Party	Candidate	Votes	%
Republican	Peter Roskam (incumbent)	76,146	100.0
Total votes		76,146	100.0

=== Democratic primary ===
==== Candidates ====
===== Nominee =====
- Leslie Coolidge, certified public accountant and former partner at KPMG

===== Eliminated in primary =====
- Geoffrey Petzel, small business owner
- Maureen E. Yates, retired businesswoman

===== Disqualified =====
- Tim Ritter, graduate student at the University of Illinois at Chicago

==== Endorsements ====
Leslie Coolidge

Newspapers

- Chicago Tribune

==== Primary results ====
Democratic primary results
Party	Candidate	Votes	%
Democratic	Leslie Coolidge	9,919	54.5
Democratic	Maureen Yates	5,934	32.6
Democratic	Geoffrey Petzel	2,343	12.9
Total votes		18,196	100.0

=== Independents ===
Khizar Jafri, a traffic analyst, ran as an Independent.

=== General election ===
==== Endorsements ====
Peter Roskam (R)

Organizations

- Campaign for Working Families
- Humane Society of the United States
- National Right to Life Committee
- NRA Political Victory Fund
- United States Chamber of Commerce

Newspapers

- Chicago Tribune
Leslie Coolidge (D)

Labor unions

- AFL-CIO
- United Steelworkers

Organizations

- Democracy for America
- National Organization for Women
- Planned Parenthood Action Fund
- Sierra Club

==== Predictions ====
Source	Ranking	As of
The Cook Political Report	Safe R	November 5, 2012
Rothenberg	Safe R	November 2, 2012
Roll Call	Safe R	November 4, 2012
Sabato's Crystal Ball	Safe R	November 5, 2012
NY Times	Safe R	November 4, 2012
RCP	Safe R	November 4, 2012
The Hill	Safe R	November 4, 2012

==== Results ====
Illinois's 6th congressional district, 2012
Party	Candidate	Votes	%
Republican	Peter Roskam (incumbent)	193,138	59.2
Democratic	Leslie Coolidge	132,991	40.8
Total votes		326,129	100.0
Republican hold			

== District 7 ==
2012 Illinois's 7th congressional district election
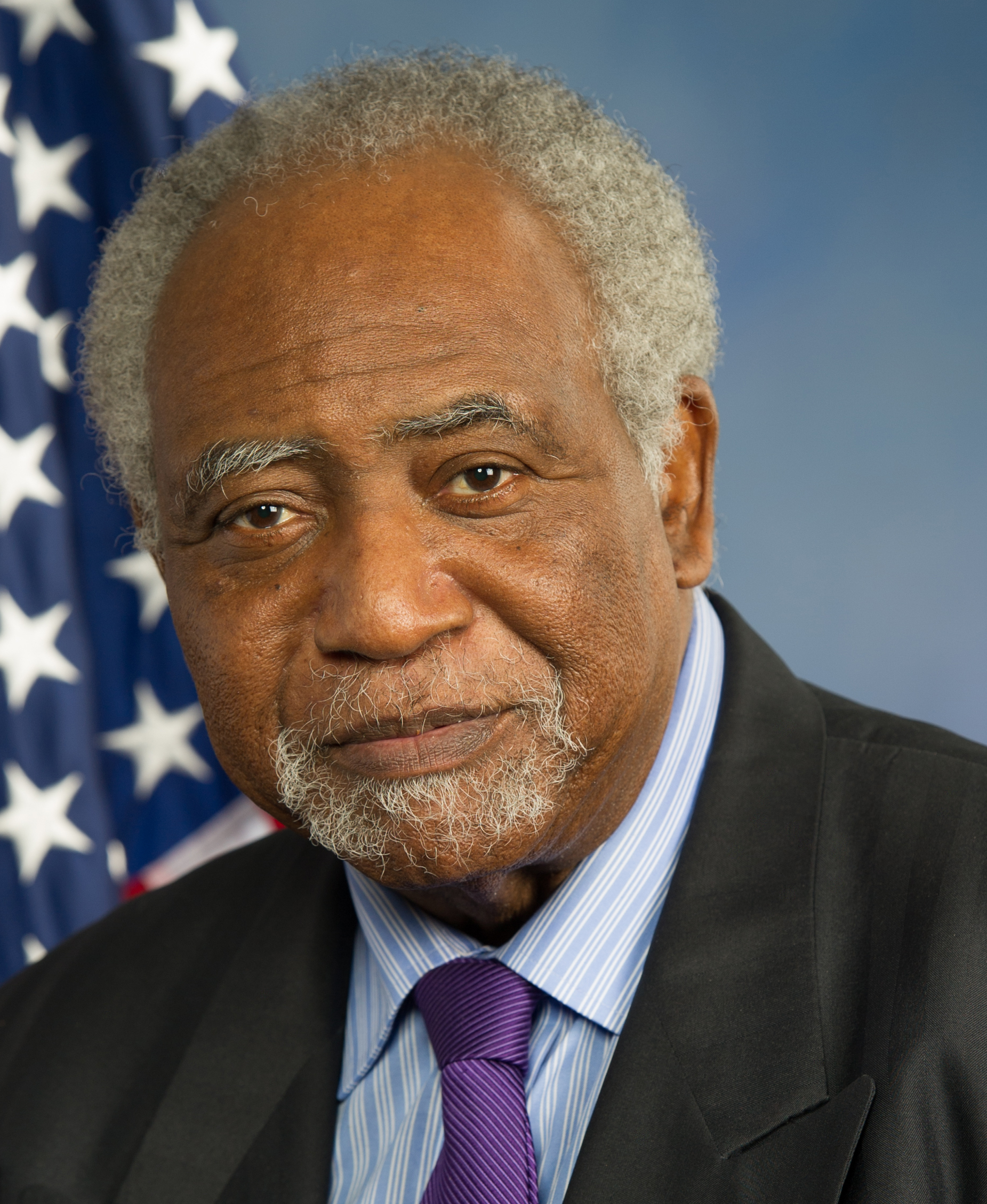

Nominee	Danny K. Davis	Rita Zak
Party	Democratic	Republican
Popular vote	242,439	31,466
Percentage	84.6%	11.0%
- County results Davis: 80–90%
U.S. Representative before election
Danny K. Davis
Democratic
Elected U.S. Representative
Danny K. Davis
Democratic

The 7th district, which had been represented by Democrat Danny K. Davis since 1997, was redrawn to include parts of LaGrange Park and Westchester. Davis sought re-election.

=== Democratic primary ===
==== Candidates ====
===== Nominee =====
- Danny Davis, incumbent U.S. representative

===== Eliminated in primary =====
- Jacques A. Conway, pastor and retired police officer

==== Endorsements ====
Danny Davis

Newspapers

- Chicago Tribune

==== Primary results ====
Democratic primary results
Party	Candidate	Votes	%
Democratic	Danny Davis (incumbent)	57,896	84.5
Democratic	Jacques Conway	10,638	15.5
Total votes		68,534	100.0

=== Republican primary ===
==== Candidates ====
===== Nominee =====
- Rita Zak

=== General election ===
==== Endorsements ====
Danny Davis (D)

Labor unions

- AFL-CIO
- National Association of Letter Carriers
- United Steelworkers

Organizations

- Humane Society of the United States
- J Street
- National Organization for Women
- Planned Parenthood Action Fund
- Sierra Club

Newspapers

- Chicago Tribune

==== Predictions ====
Source	Ranking	As of
The Cook Political Report	Safe D	November 5, 2012
Rothenberg	Safe D	November 2, 2012
Roll Call	Safe D	November 4, 2012
Sabato's Crystal Ball	Safe D	November 5, 2012
NY Times	Safe D	November 4, 2012
RCP	Safe D	November 4, 2012
The Hill	Safe D	November 4, 2012

==== Results ====
Illinois's 7th congressional district, 2012
Party	Candidate	Votes	%
Democratic	Danny K. Davis (incumbent)	242,439	84.6
Republican	Rita Zak	31,466	11.0
Independent	John Monaghan	12,523	4.4
Independent	Phil Collins (write-in)	5	0.0
Independent	Dennis Richter (write-in)	2	0.0
Total votes		286,435	100.0
Democratic hold			

== District 8 ==
2012 Illinois's 8th congressional district election
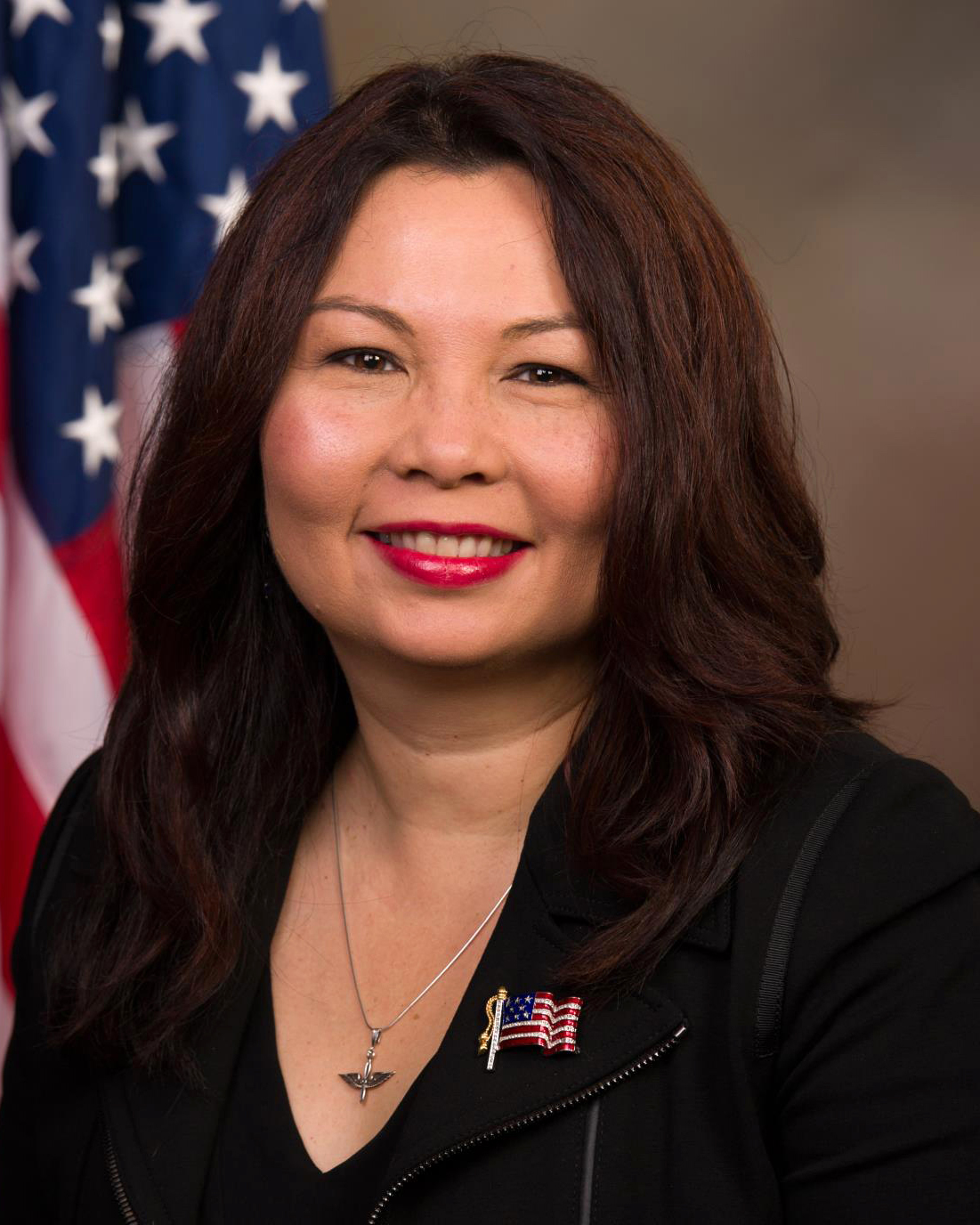

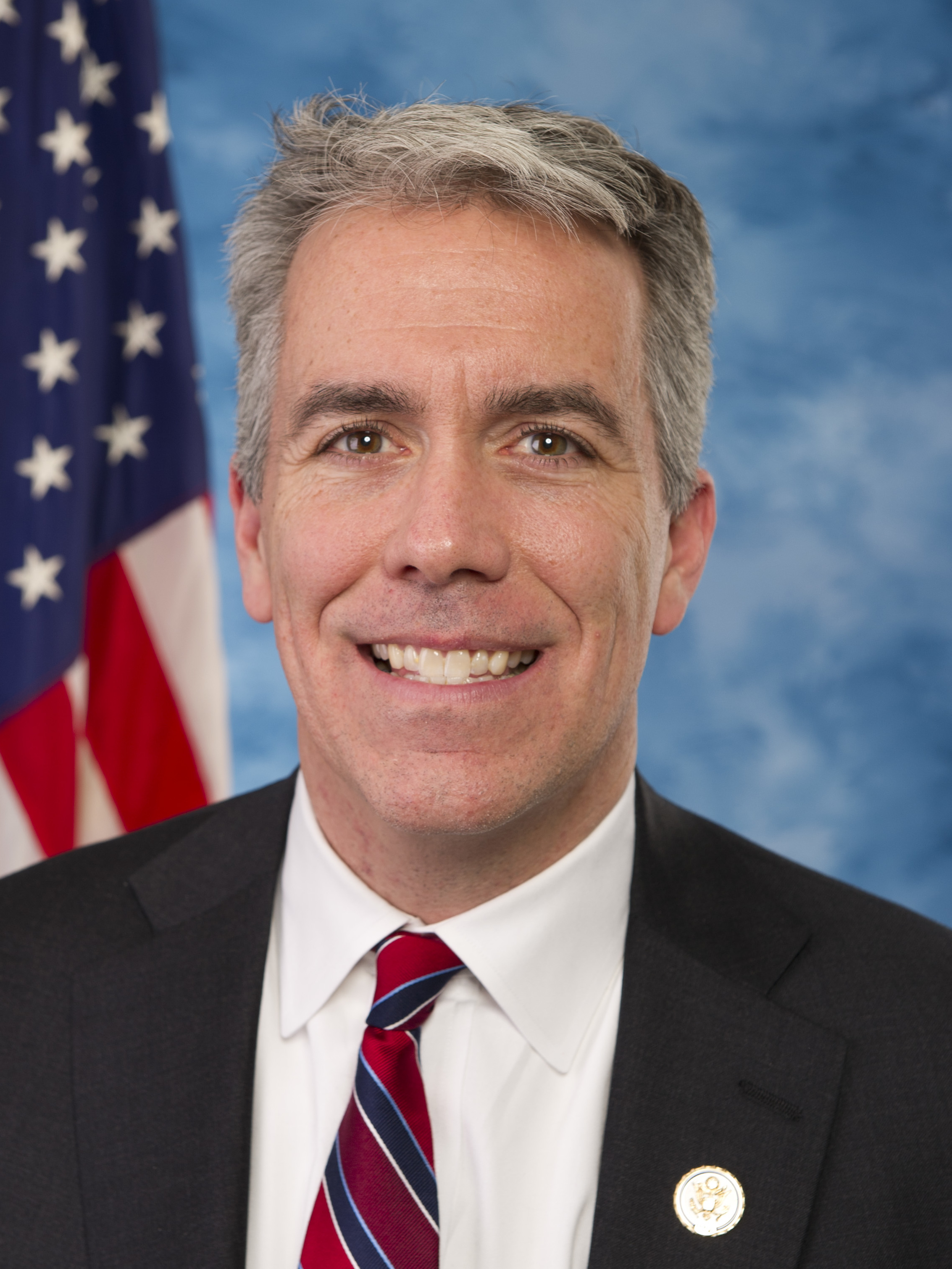
Nominee	Tammy Duckworth	Joe Walsh
Party	Democratic	Republican
Popular vote	123,206	101,860
Percentage	54.7%	45.3%
- County results Duckworth: 50–60% 60–70%
U.S. Representative before election
Joe Walsh
Republican
Elected U.S. Representative
Tammy Duckworth
Democratic

Republican Joe Walsh, who was first elected to represent the 8th district in 2010, ran for re-election despite no longer living within the redrawn boundaries of the district. Walsh had initially decided to run in the redrawn 14th district.

=== Republican primary ===
Walsh defeated write-in candidate Robert Canfield, a business owner who had planned to challenge him in the Republican primary before being removed from the ballot by the Illinois Board of Elections.

==== Candidates ====
===== Nominee =====
- Joe Walsh, incumbent U.S. representative

===== Eliminated in primary =====
- Robert Canfield, business owner

===== Withdrawn =====
- Rick Veenstra, DuPage County assistant state attorney

===== Disqualified =====
- Rich Evans, accountant

===== Declined =====
- David Harris, state representative
- Craig Johnson, mayor of Elk Grove Village
- Andrew Palomo, businessman
- Darlene Ruscitti, DuPage County superintendent of Education

==== Primary results ====
Republican primary results
Party	Candidate	Votes	%
Republican	Joe Walsh (incumbent)	35,102	99.9
Republican	Robert Canfield (write-in)	54	0.1
Total votes		35,156	100.0

=== Democratic primary ===
==== Candidates ====
===== Nominee =====
- Tammy Duckworth, Iraq veteran, former official in the U.S. Department of Veterans Affairs and nominee for the 6th district in 2006

===== Eliminated in primary =====
- Raja Krishnamoorthi, former deputy state treasurer and candidate for Illinois Comptroller in 2010

===== Declined =====
- Melissa Bean, former U.S. representative (endorsed Krishnamoorthi)

==== Endorsements ====
Tammy Duckworth

Organizations

- EMILY's List
- VoteVets

Newspapers

- Chicago Tribune
Raja Krishnamoorthi

U.S. representatives

- Melissa Bean, U.S. representative from Illinois's 8th congressional district (2005–2011)

==== Primary results ====
Democratic primary results
Party	Candidate	Votes	%
Democratic	Tammy Duckworth	17,097	66.2
Democratic	Raja Krishnamoorthi	8,736	33.8
Total votes		25,833	100.0

=== General election ===
==== Campaign ====
Walsh and Duckworth scheduled four debates. The first was held on May 12, 2012, on CLTV, the second on September 14 in West Dundee at Heritage Fest, and the third on October 9 on WCPT and WIND at the Meadows Club in Rolling Meadows, open to 8th district residents. The fourth was held on October 18 on WTTW's Chicago Tonight.

==== Endorsements ====
Joe Walsh (R)

Organizations

- FreedomWorks
- National Republican Congressional Committee "Patriot" Program
- National Right to Life Committee
- NRA Political Victory Fund
- Tea Party Express
- United States Chamber of Commerce
Tammy Duckworth (D)

Labor unions

- AFL-CIO
- National Association of Letter Carriers

Organizations

- Democratic Congressional Campaign Committee "Red to Blue" Program
- EMILY's List
- Feminist Majority
- J Street
- NARAL Pro-Choice America
- National Organization for Women
- Planned Parenthood Action Fund
- Sierra Club
- Veterans' Alliance for Security and Democracy
- VoteVets

Newspapers

- Chicago Tribune
- Daily Herald

==== Debates ====
- Complete video of debate, October 18, 2012

==== Polling ====
Poll source	Date(s) administered	Sample size	Margin of error	Joe Walsh (R)	Tammy Duckworth (D)	Undecided
We Ask America	October 28, 2012	1,010 (LV)	± 3.1%	45%	55%	—
Public Policy Polling (D-CREDO)	October 25–26, 2012	500 (LV)	± 4.4%	40%	54%	5%
Chicago Tribune/WGN	October 20–24, 2012	600 (LV)	± 4.0%	40%	50%	9%
Anzalone-Liszt (D-LCV)	October 16–18, 2012	400 (LV)	± 4.9%	39%	54%	7%
DCCC (D)	October 4, 2012	315 (LV)	± 5.5%	42%	52%	6%
Public Policy Polling (D-League of Conservation Voters)	September 18–20, 2012	508 (LV)	± 4.4%	38%	52%	10%
Public Policy Polling (D-CREDO SuperPAC)	August 13–14, 2012	500 (LV)	± 4.4%	41%	50%	9%

==== Predictions ====
Source	Ranking	As of
The Cook Political Report	Likely D (flip)	November 5, 2012
Rothenberg	Likely D (flip)	November 2, 2012
Roll Call	Lean D (flip)	November 4, 2012
Sabato's Crystal Ball	Lean D (flip)	November 5, 2012
NY Times	Lean D (flip)	November 4, 2012
RCP	Likely D (flip)	November 4, 2012
The Hill	Likely D (flip)	November 4, 2012

==== Results ====
Illinois's 8th congressional district, 2012
Party	Candidate	Votes	%
Democratic	Tammy Duckworth	123,206	54.7
Republican	Joe Walsh (incumbent)	101,860	45.3
Total votes		225,066	100.0
Democratic gain from Republican			

== District 9 ==
2012 Illinois's 9th congressional district election
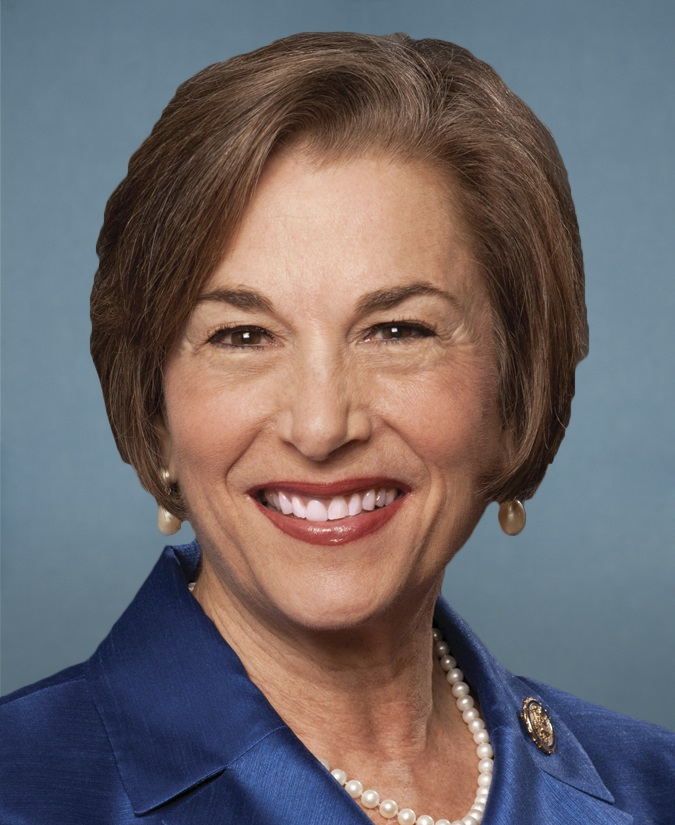

Nominee	Jan Schakowsky	Timothy Wolfe
Party	Democratic	Republican
Popular vote	194,869	98,924
Percentage	66.3%	33.7%
- County results Schakowsky: 60–70%
U.S. Representative before election
Jan Schakowsky
Democratic
Elected U.S. Representative
Jan Schakowsky
Democratic

Democrat Jan Schakowsky, who had represented the 9th district since 1999, sought re-election.

Robert Dold, who was first elected to represent the 10th district in 2010, lives in the new 9th district, but sought re-election in the 10th.

=== Democratic primary ===
==== Candidates ====
===== Nominee =====
- Jan Schakowsky, incumbent U.S. representative

===== Eliminated in primary =====
- Simon Ribeiro, high school teacher and Green Party nominee for this seat in 2010

==== Endorsements ====
Jan Schakowsky

Newspapers

- Chicago Tribune

==== Primary results ====
Democratic primary results
Party	Candidate	Votes	%
Democratic	Jan Schakowsky (incumbent)	48,124	91.9
Democratic	Simon Ribeiro	4,270	8.1
Total votes		52,394	100.0

=== Republican primary ===
==== Candidates ====
===== Nominee =====
- Timothy Wolfe

===== Withdrawn =====
- Ron Wallace, Niles Township Republican committeeman

===== Declined =====
- Robert Dold, incumbent U.S. representative for the 10th district

==== Primary results ====
Republican primary results
Party	Candidate	Votes	%
Republican	Timothy Wolfe	32,043	100.0
Total votes		32,043	100.0

=== General election ===
==== Endorsements ====
Jan Schakowsky (D)

Labor unions

- AFL-CIO
- National Association of Letter Carriers
- National Education Association
- United Steelworkers

Organizations

- Feminist Majority
- Humane Society of the United States
- J Street
- NARAL Pro-Choice America
- National Organization for Women
- Planned Parenthood Action Fund
- Sierra Club
- Stonewall Democrats
Timothy Wolfe (R)

Newspapers

- Chicago Tribune

==== Predictions ====
Source	Ranking	As of
The Cook Political Report	Safe D	November 5, 2012
Rothenberg	Safe D	November 2, 2012
Roll Call	Safe D	November 4, 2012
Sabato's Crystal Ball	Safe D	November 5, 2012
NY Times	Safe D	November 4, 2012
RCP	Safe D	November 4, 2012
The Hill	Safe D	November 4, 2012

==== Results ====
Illinois's 9th congressional district, 2012
Party	Candidate	Votes	%
Democratic	Jan Schakowsky (incumbent)	194,869	66.3
Republican	Timothy Wolfe	98,924	33.7
Independent	Hilaire Fuji Shioura (write-in)	8	0.0
Independent	Susanne Atanus (write-in)	6	0.0
Total votes		293,807	100.0
Democratic hold			

== District 10 ==
2012 Illinois's 10th congressional district election
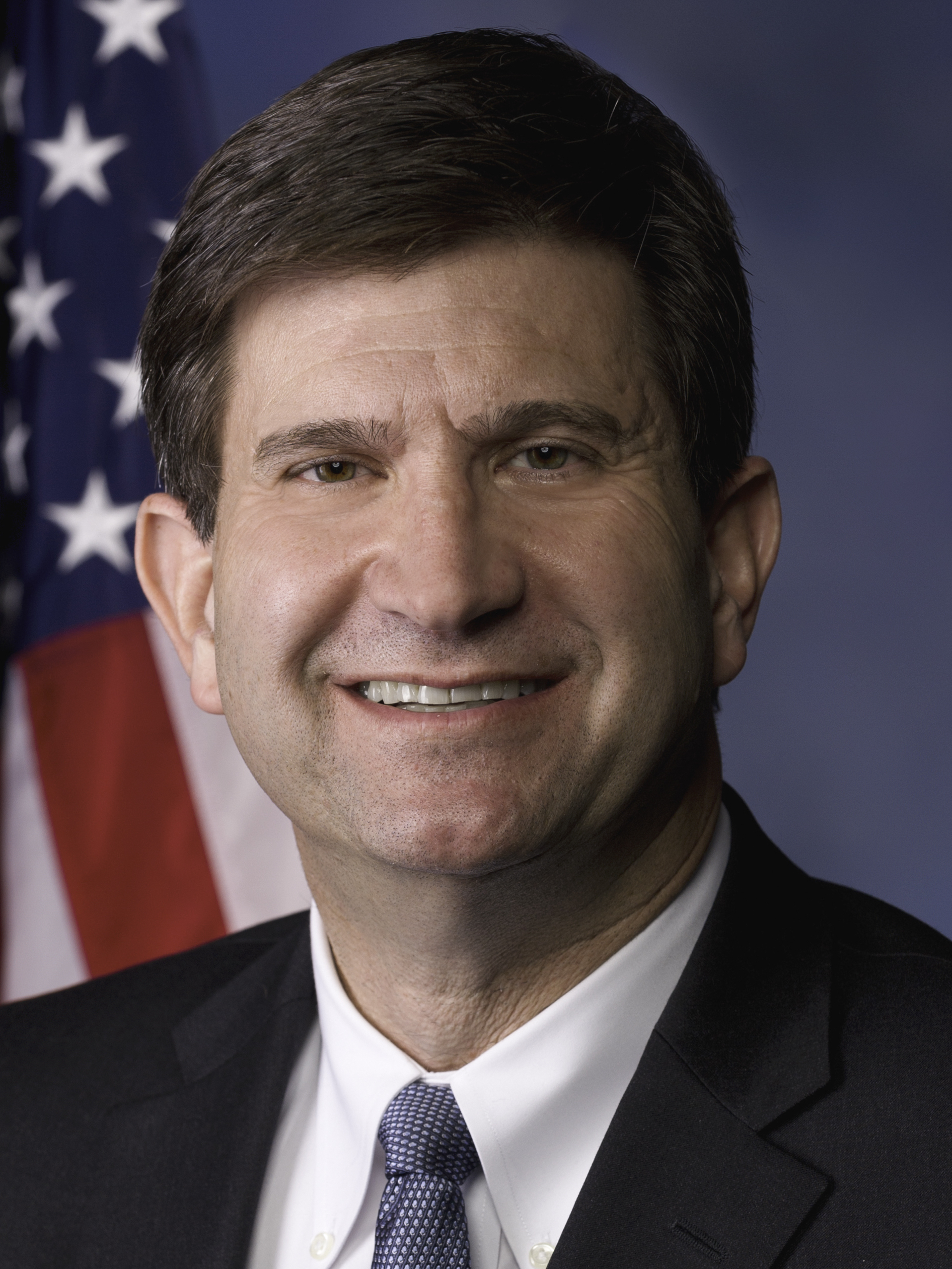

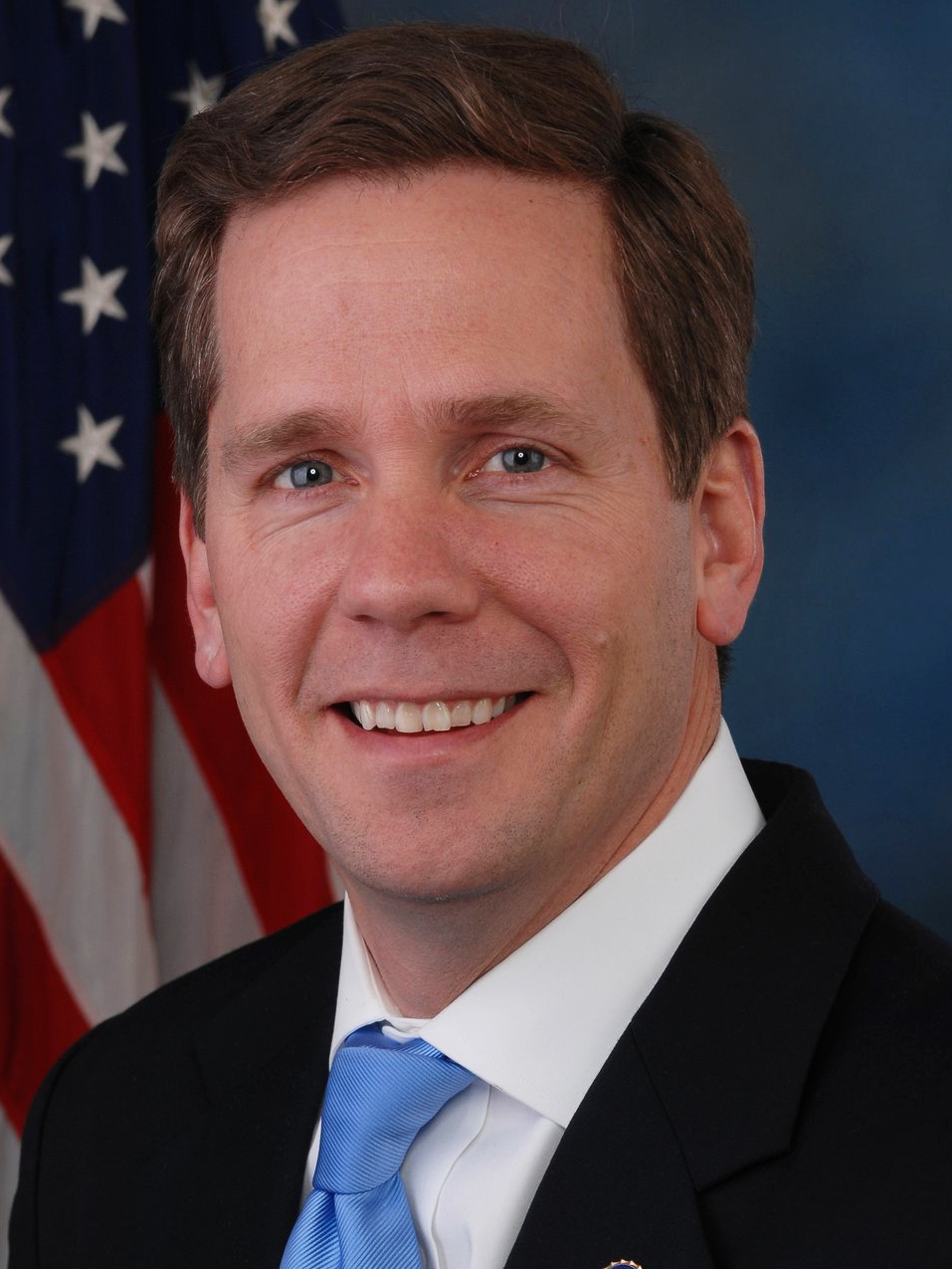
Nominee	Brad Schneider	Bob Dold
Party	Democratic	Republican
Popular vote	133,890	130,564
Percentage	50.6%	49.4%
- County results Schneider: 50–60%
U.S. Representative before election
Bob Dold
Republican
Elected U.S. Representative
Brad Schneider
Democratic

Bob Dold, who was first elected to represent the 10th district in 2010, sought re-election. Dold no longer lives in the redrawn district, but would have moved into the district if he won re-election.

=== Republican primary ===
==== Candidates ====
===== Nominee =====
- Bob Dold, incumbent U.S. representative

==== Primary results ====
Republican primary results
Party	Candidate	Votes	%
Republican	Bob Dold (incumbent)	36,647	100.0
Total votes		36,647	100.0

=== Democratic primary ===
==== Candidates ====
===== Nominee =====
- Brad Schneider, management consultant

===== Eliminated in primary =====
- Vivek Bavda, attorney
- Ilya Sheyman, community organizer
- John Tree, business executive and colonel in the U.S. Air Force Reserve

===== Withdrawn =====
- Bob McKenzie, lawyer

===== Disqualified =====
- Aloys Rutagwibira, mathematician and basketball coach

===== Declined =====
- Susan Garrett, state senator
- Carol Sente, state representative

==== Endorsements ====
Brad Schneider

Newspapers

- Chicago Tribune
Ilya Sheyman

Organizations

- Sierra Club
John Tree

Organizations

- Veterans' Alliance for Security and Democracy

==== Primary results ====
Democratic primary results
Party	Candidate	Votes	%
Democratic	Brad Schneider	15,530	46.9
Democratic	Ilya Sheyman	12,767	38.5
Democratic	John Tree	2,938	8.9
Democratic	Vivek Bavda	1,881	5.7
Democratic	Aloys Rutagwibira (write-in)	8	0.0
Total votes		33,124	100.0

=== General election ===
==== Endorsements ====
Bob Dold (R)

Labor unions

- National Education Association

Organizations

- GOProud
- Humane Society of the United States
- Log Cabin Republicans
- National Republican Congressional Committee "Patriot" Program
- United States Chamber of Commerce

Newspapers

- Chicago Tribune
Brad Schneider (D)

Labor unions

- AFL-CIO
- National Association of Letter Carriers
- United Steelworkers

Organizations

- Council for a Livable World
- Democratic Congressional Campaign Committee "Red to Blue" Program
- NARAL Pro-Choice America
- Sierra Club

==== Debates ====
- Complete video of debate, October 23, 2012

==== Polling ====
Poll source	Date(s) administered	Sample size	Margin of error	Bob Dold (R)	Brad Schneider (D)	Undecided
We Ask America	October 28, 2012	1,257	± 2.8%	46%	54%	—
DCCC (D)	October 14, 2012	451	± 4.6%	43%	44%	13%
Greenberg Quinlan Rosner Research (D-House Majority PAC)/SEIU)	August 8–12, 2012	400	± 4.9%	46%	46%	8%
McLaughlin & Associates	June 20–21, 2012	400	± 4.9%	42%	32%	26%
Normington, Petts & Associates	May 21–23, 2012	400	± 4.9%	39%	39%	22%

==== Predictions ====
Source	Ranking	As of
The Cook Political Report	Tossup	November 5, 2012
Rothenberg	Tossup	November 2, 2012
Roll Call	Tossup	November 4, 2012
Sabato's Crystal Ball	Lean R	November 5, 2012
NY Times	Lean D (flip)	November 4, 2012
RCP	Tossup	November 4, 2012
The Hill	Tossup	November 4, 2012

==== Results ====
Illinois's 10th congressional district, 2012
Party	Candidate	Votes	%
Democratic	Brad Schneider	133,890	50.6
Republican	Bob Dold (incumbent)	130,564	49.4
Total votes		264,454	100.0
Democratic gain from Republican			

== District 11 ==
2012 Illinois's 11th congressional district election
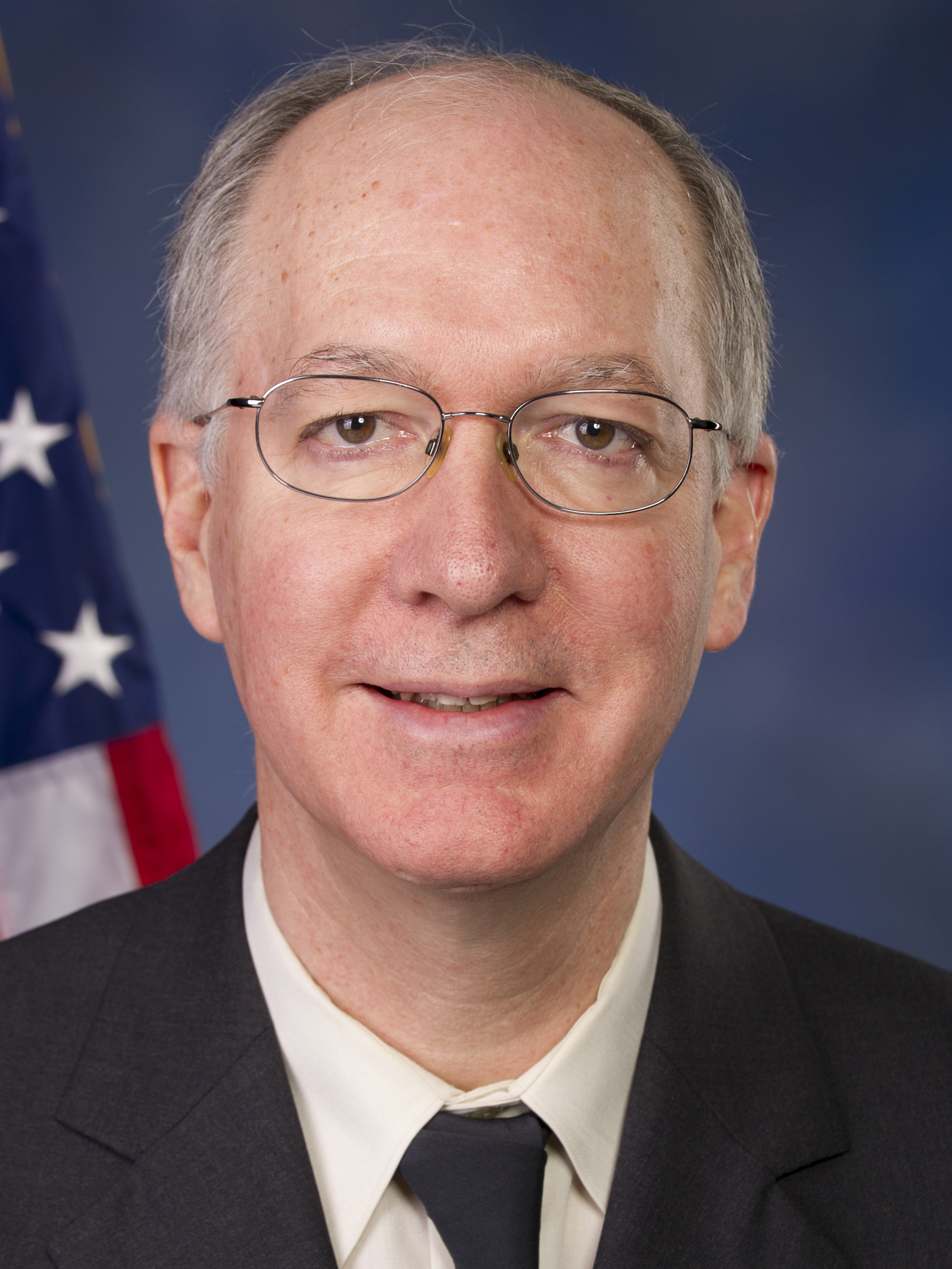

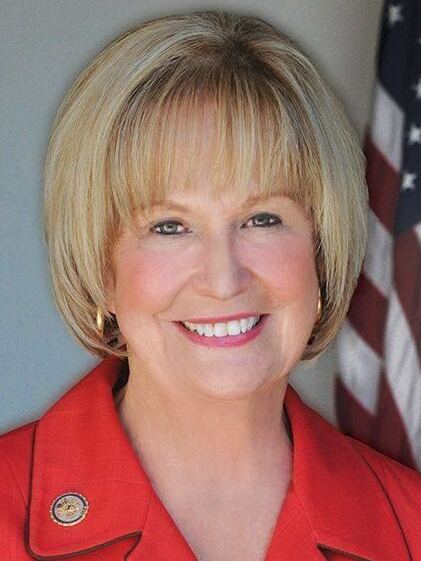
Nominee	Bill Foster	Judy Biggert
Party	Democratic	Republican
Popular vote	148,928	105,348
Percentage	58.6%	41.4%
- County results Foster: 50–60% 60–70% Biggert: 60–70%
U.S. Representative before election
Adam Kinzinger (Republican)
Judy Biggert (Republican)
Elected U.S. Representative
Bill Foster
Democratic

The newly drawn 11th district is the successor to the old 13th district, which had been represented by Republican Judy Biggert since 1999. While the reconfigured district contains half of Biggert's former territory, it was made significantly more Democratic than before. It now includes the Democratic-leaning areas of Joliet and Aurora. Biggert's home in Hinsdale was drawn into the 6th district, but she sought reelection in this district.

=== Republican primary ===
Biggert won the primary against nominal write-in opposition from Harris.

==== Candidates ====
===== Nominee =====
- Judy Biggert, incumbent U.S. representative

===== Eliminated in primary =====
- Diane Harris, notary public

===== Disqualified =====
- Jack Cunningham, Kane County clerk

===== Declined =====
- Chris Balkema, member of the Grundy County Board
- Richard Irvin, Aurora alderman
- Chris Lauzen, state senator (running for Kane County Board chairman)

==== Endorsements ====
Jack Cunningham

Organizations

- Eagle Forum

==== Primary results ====
Republican primary results
Party	Candidate	Votes	%
Republican	Judy Biggert (incumbent)	31,471	99.9
Republican	Diane Harris (write-in)	37	0.1
Total votes		31,508	100.0

=== Democratic primary ===
==== Candidates ====
===== Nominee =====
- Bill Foster, former U.S. representative

===== Eliminated in primary =====
- James Hickey, president of the Orland Fire Protection District
- Juan Thomas, former Aurora Township clerk

===== Declined =====
- John Atkinson, insurance executive and health care activist
- Linda Chapa LaVia, state representative
- Linda Holmes, state senator

==== Endorsements ====
Bill Foster

Newspapers

- Chicago Tribune

==== Primary results ====
Democratic primary results
Party	Candidate	Votes	%
Democratic	Bill Foster	12,126	58.5
Democratic	Juan Thomas	5,212	25.1
Democratic	Jim Hickey	3,399	16.4
Total votes		20,737	100.0

=== General election ===
==== Endorsements ====
Judy Biggert (R)

Labor unions

- National Education Association

Organizations

- GOProud
- Log Cabin Republicans
- Maggie's List
- National Republican Congressional Committee "Patriot" Program
- NRA Political Victory Fund
- United States Chamber of Commerce

Newspapers

- Chicago Tribune
Bill Foster (D)

Labor unions

- AFL-CIO
- National Association of Letter Carriers
- United Steelworkers

Organizations

- Democratic Congressional Campaign Committee "Red to Blue" Program
- J Street
- NARAL Pro-Choice America
- Sierra Club

==== Polling ====
Poll source	Date(s) administered	Sample size	Margin of error	Judy Biggert (R)	Bill Foster (D)	Undecided
We Ask America	October 28, 2012	1,303	± 2.7%	50%	50%	—
Garin-Hart-Yang (D-House Majority PAC)	October 16–18, 2012	402	± 4.9%	45%	49%	6%
Global Strategy Group (D-Foster)	August 27–29, 2012	400	± 4.9%	43%	42%	15%

==== Predictions ====
Source	Ranking	As of
The Cook Political Report	Tossup	November 5, 2012
Rothenberg	Tossup	November 2, 2012
Roll Call	Tossup	November 4, 2012
Sabato's Crystal Ball	Lean D (flip)	November 5, 2012
NY Times	Lean D (flip)	November 4, 2012
RCP	Lean D (flip)	November 4, 2012
The Hill	Lean D (flip)	November 4, 2012

==== Results ====
Illinois's 11th congressional district, 2012
Party	Candidate	Votes	%
Democratic	Bill Foster	148,928	58.6
Republican	Judy Biggert (incumbent)	105,348	41.4
Independent	Chris Michel (write-in)	19	0.0
Total votes		254,295	100.0
Democratic gain from Republican			

== District 12 ==
2012 Illinois's 12th congressional district election
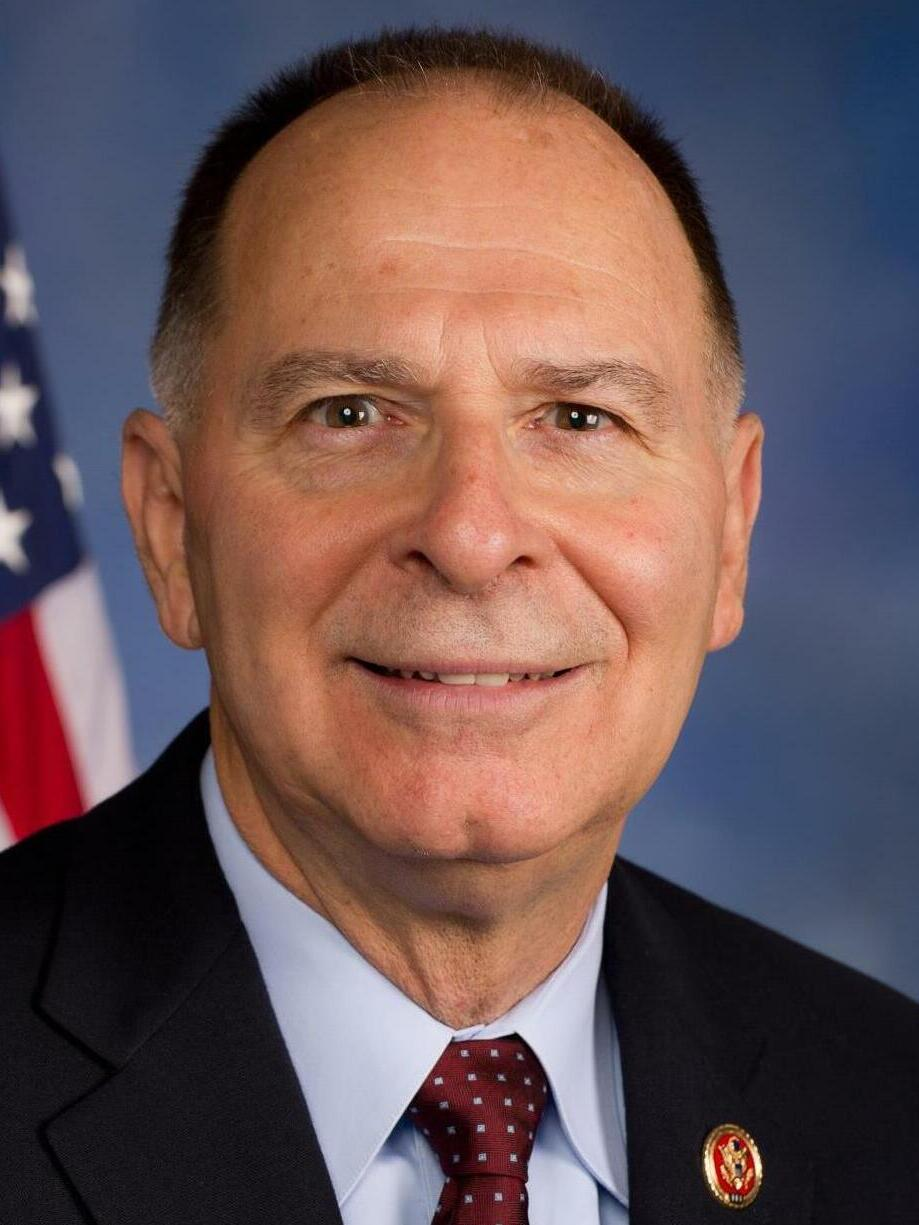

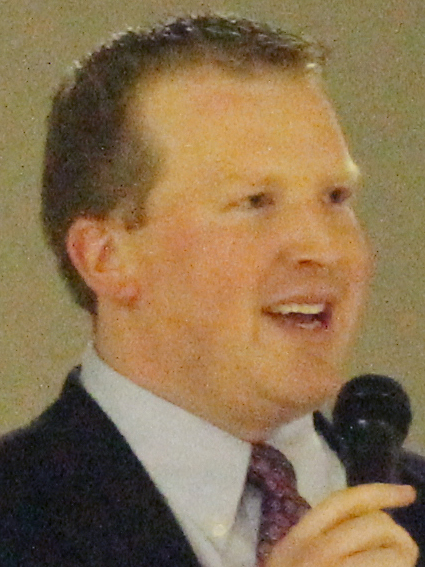

Nominee	William Enyart	Jason Plummer	Paula Bradshaw
Party	Democratic	Republican	Green
Popular vote	157,000	129,902	17,045
Percentage	51.7%	42.7%	5.6%
- County results Enyart: 40–50% 50–60% Plummer: 40–50% 50–60%
U.S. Representative before election
Jerry Costello
Democratic
Elected U.S. Representative
William Enyart
Democratic

Democrat Jerry Costello, who had represented the 12th district since 1988, decided to retire rather than run for re-election.

=== Democratic primary ===
==== Candidates ====
===== Nominee =====
- Brad Harriman, St. Clair County regional superintendent

===== Eliminated in primary =====
- Kenneth Wiezer, retired carpenter

===== Withdrawn =====
- Chris Miller, Illinois political director of the Truman National Security Project and Iraq War U.S. Army veteran

===== Declined =====
- John Baricevic, St. Clair County chief judge
- John E. Bradley, state representative
- Ann Callis, Madison County chief judge
- James Clayborne, Jr., state senator
- Jerry Costello, incumbent U.S. representative
- Jerry Costello II, state representative and Jerry Costello's eldest son
- Bill Haine, state senator
- Jay C. Hoffman, former state representative
- Tom Holbrook, state representative
- Brendan Kelly, St. Clair County state's attorney
- Mark Kern, St. Clair County board chairman
- Matt Melucci, Madison County circuit clerk
- Sheila Simon, incumbent lieutenant governor

==== Campaign ====
Miller ended his campaign in February 2012 and endorsed Harriman (but remained on the primary ballot).

==== Endorsements ====
Brad Harriman

Newspapers

- Chicago Tribune

==== Primary results ====
Democratic primary results
Party	Candidate	Votes	%
Democratic	Brad Harriman	27,409	69.8
Democratic	Chris Miller	8,874	22.6
Democratic	Kenneth Wiezer	2,967	7.6
Total votes		39,250	100.0

In May 2012, Harriman dropped out of the race because of an illness. This left the decision of whom to name as a replacement candidate up to a committee that included the 12 Democratic county chairmen in the district and Rep. Costello. The committee unanimously selected Major General (ret.) and Adjutant General of Illinois William Enyart as the replacement nominee on June 23.

=== Republican primary ===
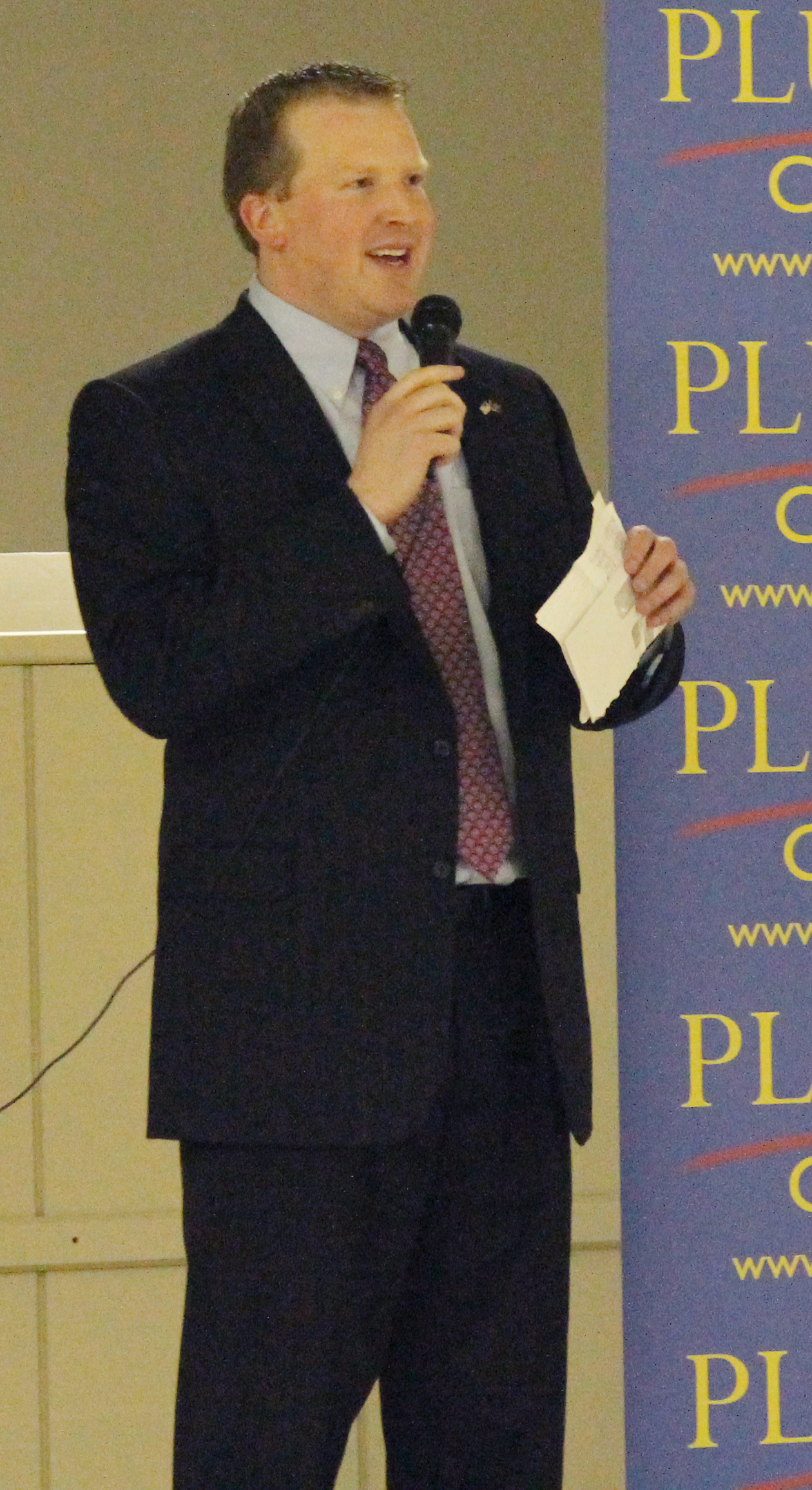
Jason Plummer at an event in Bethalto, Illinois, 2011

==== Candidates ====
===== Nominee =====
- Jason Plummer, chairman of the Madison County Republican Party and nominee for lieutenant governor in 2010

===== Eliminated in primary =====
- Rodger Cook, former mayor of Belleville
- Theresa Kormos, nurse and candidate for this seat in 2010

===== Disqualified =====
- Teri Newman, businesswoman and nominee for this seat in 2010

===== Declined =====
- Mike Bost, state representative

==== Endorsements ====
Rodger Cook

Newspapers

- Chicago Tribune

==== Primary results ====
Republican primary results
Party	Candidate	Votes	%
Republican	Jason Plummer	25,280	55.7
Republican	Rodger Cook	16,313	35.9
Republican	Theresa Kormos	3,811	8.4
Total votes		45,404	100.0

=== Green primary ===
Paula Bradshaw, a registered nurse, ran as the Green Party nominee.

=== Independents ===
Retha Daugherty, a small-business owner and resident of Carbondale, had announced her intentions to be on the ballot as an independent candidate, but had to drop her bid in April 2012 because of a change in state election law.

=== General election ===
==== Endorsements ====
Bill Enyart (D)

Labor unions

- National Association of Letter Carriers
- National Education Association
- United Steelworkers

Organizations

- Democratic Congressional Campaign Committee "Red to Blue" Program

Newspapers

- Chicago Tribune
Jason Plummer (R)

Organizations

- FreedomWorks
- Gun Owners of America
- National Republican Congressional Committee "Young Guns" Program
- National Right to Life Committee
- United States Chamber of Commerce

==== Debates ====
- Complete video of debate, September 20, 2012

==== Polling ====
Poll source	Date(s) administered	Sample size	Margin of error	Bill Enyart (D)	Jason Plummer (R)	Paula Bradshaw (G)	Undecided
We Ask America	October 28, 2012	1,313	± 2.7%	51%	46%	4%	—
Benenson (D-House Majority PAC)	September 11–13, 2012	400	± 4.9%	49%	41%	—	10%
Public Opinion Strategies	August 1–2, 2012	400	± 4.9%	28%	45%	—	27%
We Ask America	July 9, 2012	1,510	± 2.5%	34%	45%	—	21%

==== Predictions ====
Source	Ranking	As of
The Cook Political Report	Tossup	November 5, 2012
Rothenberg	Tossup	November 2, 2012
Roll Call	Tossup	November 4, 2012
Sabato's Crystal Ball	Lean D	November 5, 2012
NY Times	Tossup	November 4, 2012
RCP	Tossup	November 4, 2012
The Hill	Tossup	November 4, 2012

==== Results ====
Illinois's 12th congressional district, 2012
Party	Candidate	Votes	%
Democratic	William Enyart	157,000	51.7
Republican	Jason Plummer	129,902	42.7
Green	Paula Bradshaw	17,045	5.6
Independent	Shon-Tiyon Horton (write-in)	2	0.0
Total votes		303,947	100.0
Democratic hold			

== District 13 ==
2012 Illinois's 13th congressional district election
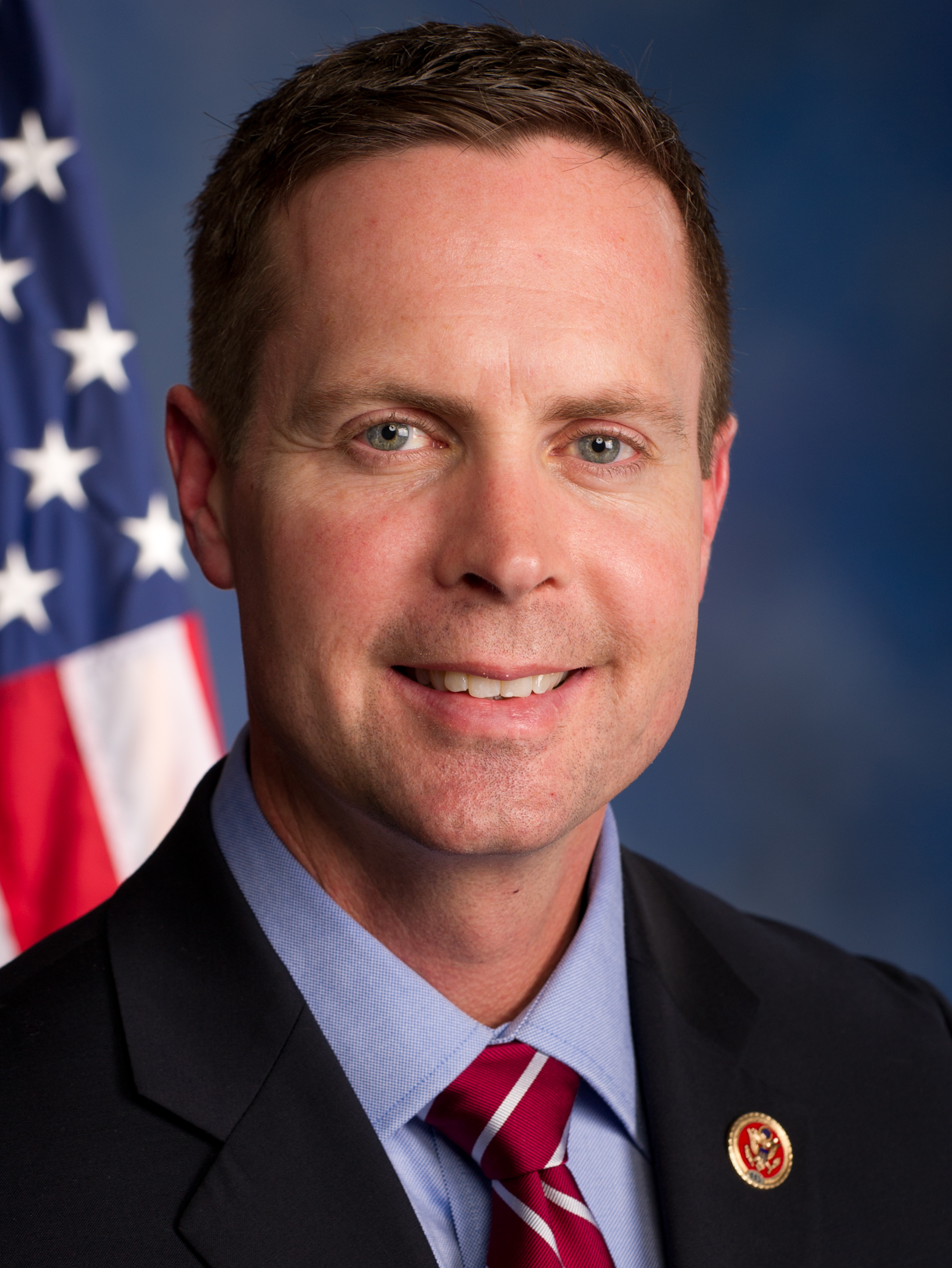

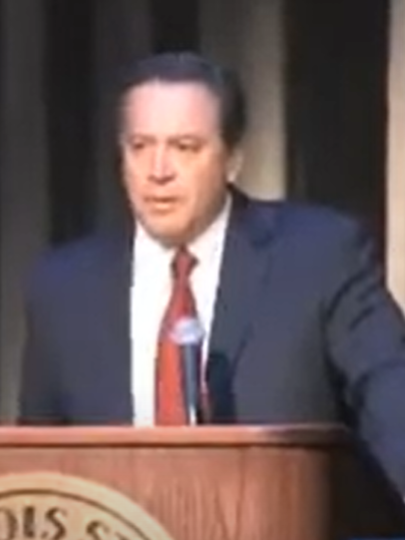

Nominee	Rodney Davis	David Gill	John Hartman
Party	Republican	Democratic	Independent
Popular vote	137,034	136,032	21,319
Percentage	46.6%	46.2%	7.2%
- County results Davis: 40–50% 50–60% 60–70% Gill: 50–60%
U.S. Representative before election
Judy Biggert (Republican)
Tim Johnson (Republican)
Elected U.S. Representative
Rodney Davis
Republican

The new 13th is the successor to the old 15th district, represented by Republican Tim Johnson since 2001.

=== Republican primary ===
==== Candidates ====
===== Nominee =====
- Tim Johnson, incumbent U.S. representative

===== Eliminated in primary =====
- Michael Firsching, veterinarian
- Frank Metzger, retired ironworker

==== Endorsements ====
Tim Johnson

Newspapers

- Chicago Tribune

==== Primary results ====
Republican primary results
Party	Candidate	Votes	%
Republican	Tim Johnson (incumbent)	35,655	68.7
Republican	Frank Metzger	9,571	18.4
Republican	Michael Firsching	6,706	12.9
Total votes		51,932	100.0

=== Republican convention ===
Although Johnson won the primary, in April 2012, he chose to retire rather than seek re-election. A convention was held on May 19, 2012, to choose a replacement nominee. The 14 GOP county chairmen in the district unanimously selected Rodney Davis as the party nominee.

==== Candidates ====
===== Nominee =====
- Rodney L. Davis, aide to U.S. Representative John Shimkus

===== Eliminated at the convention =====
- Jerry Clarke, chief of staff to U.S. Representative Randy Hultgren and Johnson's former chief of staff
- Erika Harold, lawyer and 2003 Miss America
- Kathy Wassink, businesswoman.

===== Declined =====
- Jason Barickman, state representative
- Phil Bloomer, Johnson's communications director
- Bill Brady, state senator and nominee for governor in 2010
- Dan Brady, state representative
- Adam Brown, state representative
- Sam McCann, state senator
- Kyle McCarter, state senator
- Duane Noland, former state senator
- Chapin Rose, state representative
- Mark Shelden, Johnson's current chief of staff
- Mike Tate, CEO of the Independent Insurance Agents of Illinois and former state representative
- Jim Watson, state representative

=== Democratic primary ===
==== Candidates ====
===== Nominee =====
- David Gill, physician and nominee for the 15th district in 2004, 2006 and 2010

===== Eliminated in primary =====
- Matt Goetten, Greene County state attorney

===== Withdrawn =====
- James Gray, retired school administrator

===== Declined =====
- Mike Frerichs, state senator
- Jay Hoffman, former state representative
- Mark N. Lee, labor lawyer
- Brendan McGinty, Champaign County Board member

==== Endorsements ====
Matt Goetten

Newspapers

- Chicago Tribune

==== Primary results ====
Results by county: Gill—70–80% Gill—60–70% Goetten—80–90% Goetten—60–70% Goetten—50–60%

Democratic primary results
Party	Candidate	Votes	%
Democratic	David Gill	15,536	50.3
Democratic	Matt Goetten	15,373	49.7
Total votes		30,909	100.0

=== Independent ===
John Hartman, a medical technology company CFO, ran as an independent candidate.

=== General election ===
==== Endorsements ====
Rodney Davis (R)

Organizations

- National Republican Congressional Committee "Young Guns" Program
- National Right to Life Committee
- NRA Political Victory Fund
- United States Chamber of Commerce

Newspapers

- Chicago Tribune
David Gill (D)

Labor unions

- AFL-CIO
- National Association of Letter Carriers
- National Education Association
- United Steelworkers

Organizations

- Citizens for Global Solutions
- Council for a Livable World
- Democracy for America
- Democratic Congressional Campaign Committee "Red to Blue" Program
- Feminist Majority
- NARAL Pro-Choice America
- National Organization for Women
- Planned Parenthood Action Fund
- Progressive Change Campaign Committee
- Progressive Democrats of America
- Sierra Club

==== Debates ====
- Complete video of debate, October 17, 2012

==== Polling ====
Poll source	Date(s) administered	Sample size	Margin of error	Rodney Davis (R)	David Gill (D)	John Hartman (I)	Undecided
We Ask America	October 28, 2012	1,360 (LV)	± 2.7%	50%	45%	4%	1%
Anzalone-Liszt (D-DCCC)	October 18–21, 2012	400 (LV)	± 4.9%	39%	48%	–	13%
DCCC (D)	October 11–12, 2012	458 (LV)	± 4.6%	37%	43%	7%	13%
Victoria Research (D-Gill)	September 26–27, 2012	400 (LV)	± 4.9%	39%	40%	8%	13%
Victoria Research (D-Gill)	August 4–7, 2012	400 (LV)	± 4.9%	30%	36%	9%	25%
We Ask America	June 7, 2012	1,299 (LV)	± 2.8%	47%	38%	—	15%
Victoria Research (D-Gill)	April 11–13, 2012	400 (RV)	± 4.9%	31%	41%	—	28%

Hypothetical polling

With Jerry Clarke

Poll source	Date(s) administered	Sample size	Margin of error	Jerry Clarke (R)	David Gill (D)	Undecided
Victoria Research (D-Gill)	April 11–13, 2012	400 (RV)	± 4.9%	33%	40%	17%

With Generic Democratic

Poll source	Date(s) administered	Sample size	Margin of error	Generic Republican (R)	Generic Democrat (D)	Undecided
Victoria Research (D-Gill)	April 11–13, 2012	400 (RV)	± 4.9%	35%	38%	27%

==== Predictions ====
Source	Ranking	As of
The Cook Political Report	Tossup	November 5, 2012
Rothenberg	Tossup	November 2, 2012
Roll Call	Tossup	November 4, 2012
Sabato's Crystal Ball	Lean D (flip)	November 5, 2012
NY Times	Lean R	November 4, 2012
RCP	Tossup	November 4, 2012
The Hill	Tossup	November 4, 2012

==== Results ====
Illinois's 13th congressional district, 2012
Party	Candidate	Votes	%
Republican	Rodney L. Davis	137,034	46.6
Democratic	David Gill	136,032	46.2
Independent	John Hartman	21,319	7.2
Total votes		294,385	100.0
Republican hold			

== District 14 ==
2012 Illinois's 14th congressional district election
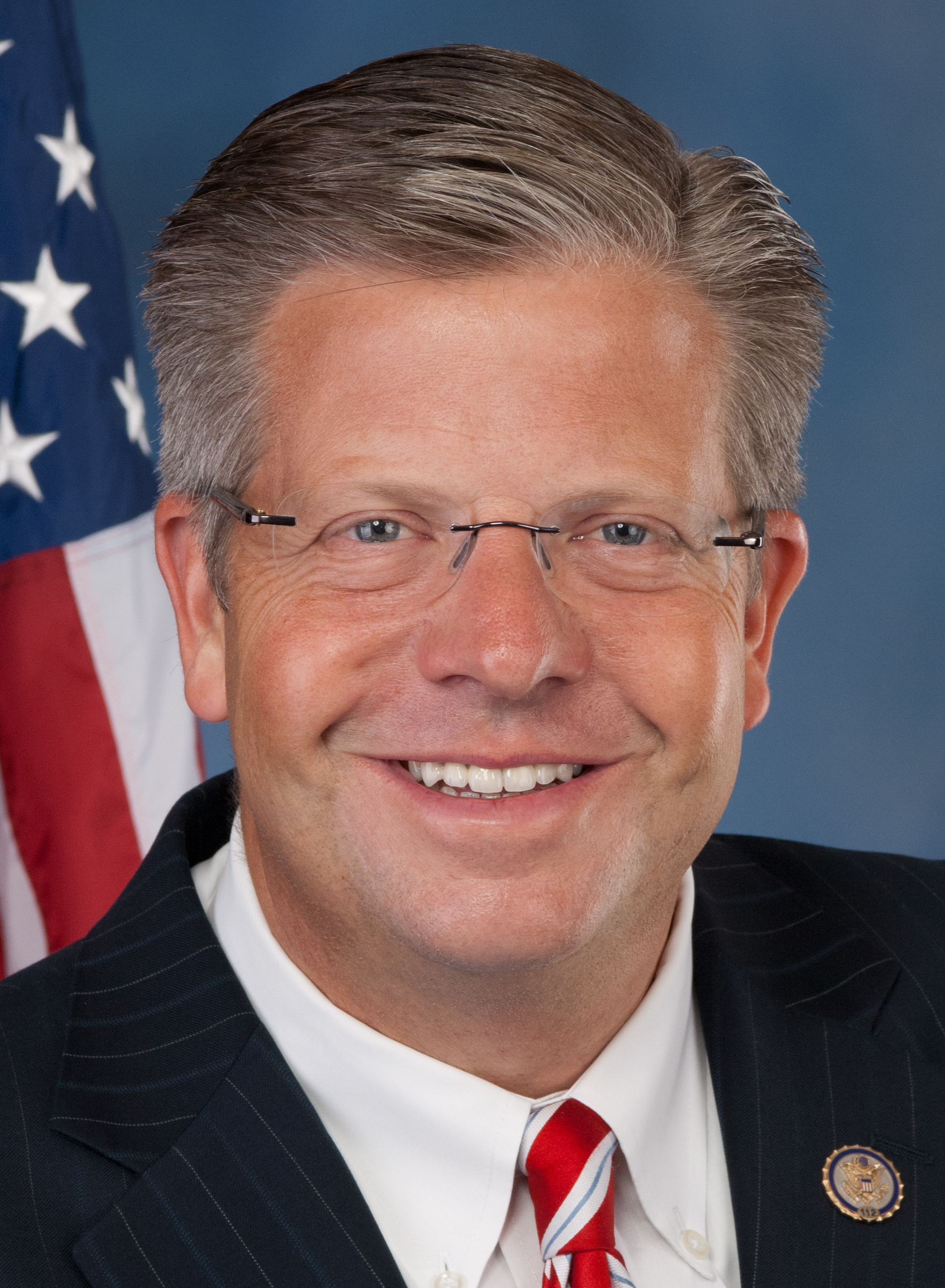

Nominee	Randy Hultgren	Dennis Anderson
Party	Republican	Democratic
Popular vote	177,603	124,351
Percentage	58.8%	41.2%
- County results Hultgren: 50–60% 60–70% Anderson: 50–60%
U.S. Representative before election
Randy Hultgren
Republican
Elected U.S. Representative
Randy Hultgren
Republican

The redrawn 14th district includes McHenry County and parts of DuPage, Kane, Kendall, Lake, and Will counties. The new 14th district remained one of the two Safe GOP seats in the Chicagoland area, alongside the 6th. Republican Randy Hultgren, who was first elected to represent the 14th district in 2010, ran for re-election.

=== Republican primary ===
==== Candidates ====
===== Nominee =====
- Randy Hultgren, incumbent U.S. representative

===== Declined =====
- Joe Walsh, incumbent U.S. representative for the 8th district

==== Primary results ====
Republican primary results
Party	Candidate	Votes	%
Republican	Randy Hultgren (incumbent)	64,419	100.0
Republican	Mark Mastrogiovanni (write-in)	1	0.0
Total votes		64,420	100.0

=== Democratic primary ===
Bill Foster, a Democrat who represented the 14th district from 2008 until 2011, decided to run in the 11th district in 2012, although some Illinois General Assembly leaders had hoped he would run in the 14th district, where his home is located.

==== Candidates ====
===== Nominee =====
- Dennis Anderson, public health researcher and International Breast Cancer Research Foundation trustee

===== Eliminated in primary =====
- Jonathan Farnick, computer support technician

===== Declined =====
- Jack Franks, state representative
- Frank McClatchey, former McHenry alderman and former chairman of the McHenry County

==== Endorsements ====
Dennis Anderson

Newspapers

- Chicago Tribune

==== Primary results ====
Democratic primary results
Party	Candidate	Votes	%
Democratic	Dennis Anderson	9,344	74.2
Democratic	Jonathan Farnick	3,258	25.8
Total votes		12,602	100.0

=== General election ===
==== Endorsements ====
Randy Hultgren (R)

Organizations

- Campaign for Working Families
- National Right to Life Committee
- NRA Political Victory Fund
- United States Chamber of Commerce
Dennis Anderson (D)

Labor unions

- AFL-CIO
- United Steelworkers

==== Predictions ====
Source	Ranking	As of
The Cook Political Report	Safe R	November 5, 2012
Rothenberg	Safe R	November 2, 2012
Roll Call	Safe R	November 4, 2012
Sabato's Crystal Ball	Safe R	November 5, 2012
NY Times	Safe R	November 4, 2012
RCP	Safe R	November 4, 2012
The Hill	Safe R	November 4, 2012

==== Results ====
Illinois's 14th congressional district, 2012
Party	Candidate	Votes	%
Republican	Randy Hultgren (incumbent)	177,603	58.8
Democratic	Dennis Anderson	124,351	41.2
Total votes		301,954	100.0
Republican hold			

== District 15 ==
2012 Illinois's 15th congressional district election
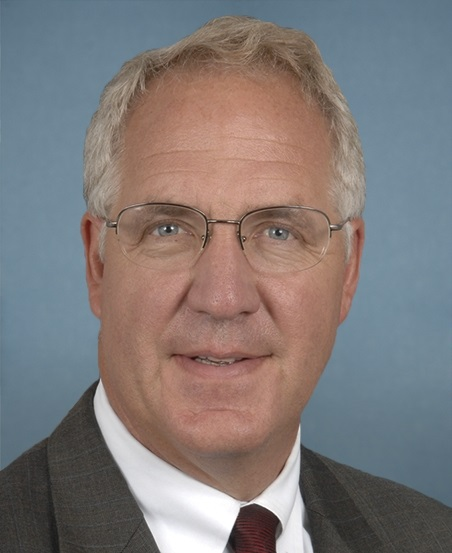

Nominee	John Shimkus	Angela Michael
Party	Republican	Democratic
Popular vote	205,775	94,162
Percentage	68.6%	31.4%
- County results Shimkus: 50–60% 60–70% 70–80% 80–90%
U.S. Representative before election
Tim Johnson (Republican)
John Shimkus (Republican)
Elected U.S. Representative
John Shimkus
Republican

Republican John Shimkus, who had represented the now-obsolete 19th district since 2003 and represented the 20th district (eliminated after redistricting following the 2000 census) from 1997 until 2003, sought re-election in the new 15th district.

=== Republican primary ===
==== Candidates ====
===== Nominee =====
- John Shimkus, incumbent U.S. representative

==== Primary results ====
Republican primary results
Party	Candidate	Votes	%
Republican	John M. Shimkus (incumbent)	66,709	100.0
Total votes		66,709	100.0

=== Democratic primary ===
==== Candidates ====
===== Nominee =====
- Angela Michael, retired nurse

==== Primary results ====
Democratic primary results
Party	Candidate	Votes	%
Democratic	Angela Michael	16,831	100.0
Total votes		16,831	100.0

=== General election ===
==== Endorsements ====
John Shimkus (R)

Labor unions

- National Association of Letter Carriers

Organizations

- National Right to Life Committee
- NRA Political Victory Fund
- United States Chamber of Commerce

==== Predictions ====
Source	Ranking	As of
The Cook Political Report	Safe R	November 5, 2012
Rothenberg	Safe R	November 2, 2012
Roll Call	Safe R	November 4, 2012
Sabato's Crystal Ball	Safe R	November 5, 2012
NY Times	Safe R	November 4, 2012
RCP	Safe R	November 4, 2012
The Hill	Safe R	November 4, 2012

==== Results ====
Illinois's 15th congressional district, 2012
Party	Candidate	Votes	%
Republican	John Shimkus (incumbent)	205,775	68.6
Democratic	Angela Michael	94,162	31.4
Total votes		299,937	100.0
Republican hold			

== District 16 ==
2012 Illinois's 16th congressional district election
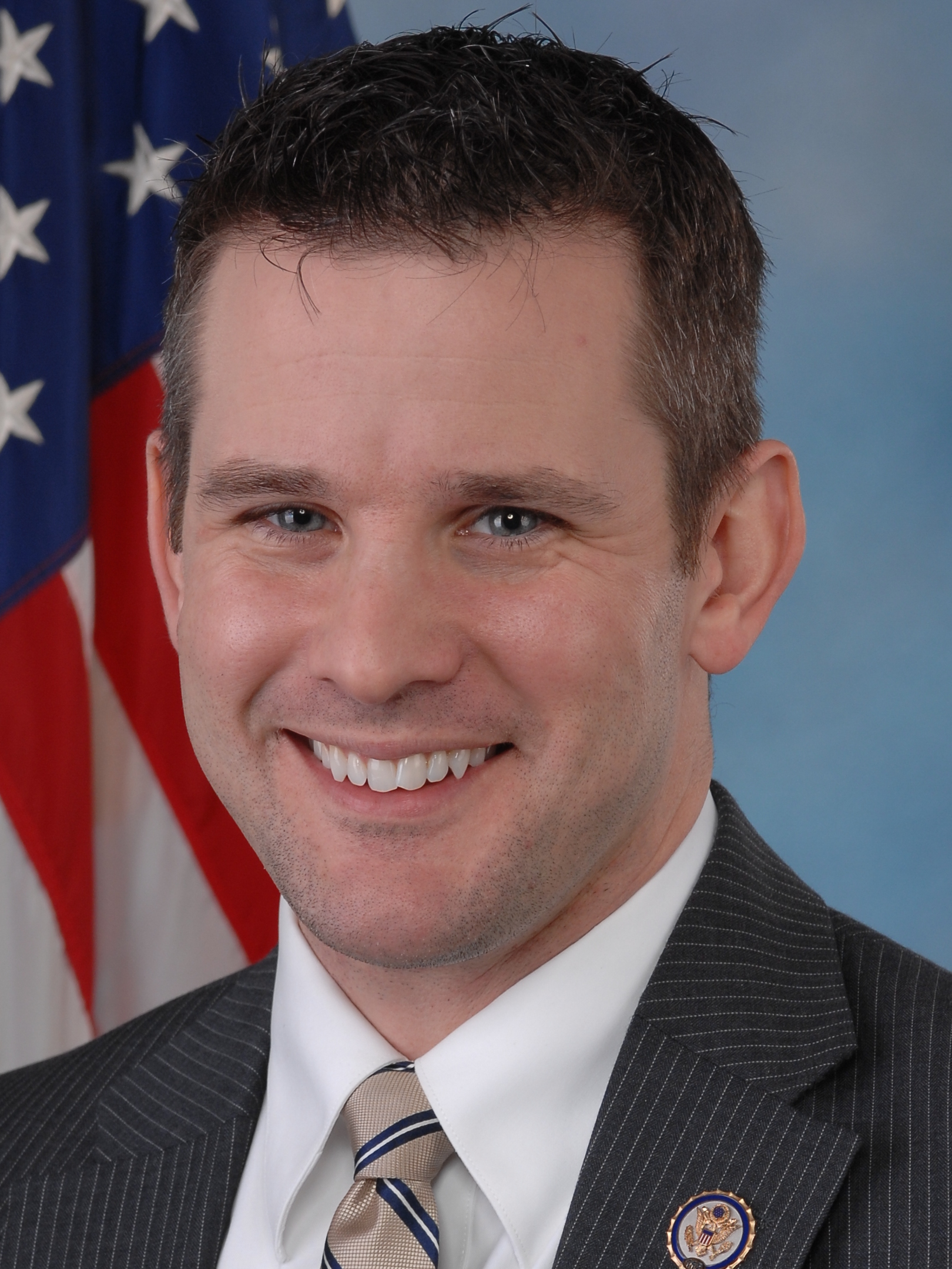

Nominee	Adam Kinzinger	Wanda Rohl
Party	Republican	Democratic
Popular vote	181,789	112,301
Percentage	61.8%	38.2%
- County results Kinzinger: 50–60% 60–70% 70–80% Rohl: 50–60%
U.S. Representative before election
Don Manzullo (Republican)
Adam Kinzinger (Republican)
Elected U.S. Representative
Adam Kinzinger
Republican

In redistricting, the 16th district was moved south to incorporate Livingston and Iroquois counties and parts of Ford County. Republican U.S. Representatives Adam Kinzinger, who had represented the 11th district since January 2011, and Don Manzullo, who had represented the 16th district since 1993, sought re-election in the new 16th district.

=== Republican primary ===
==== Candidates ====
===== Nominee =====
- Adam Kinzinger, incumbent U.S. representative from the 11th district

===== Eliminated in primary =====
- Don Manzullo, incumbent U.S. representative

===== Declined =====
- Frank Gambino, majority leader of the Winnebago County Board; announced in September 2011 that he would instead run for the Illinois Senate

==== Endorsements ====
Adam Kinzinger

Newspapers

- Chicago Tribune
Don Manzullo

Organizations

- Eagle Forum
- Family Research Council

==== Polling ====
Poll source	Date(s) administered	Sample size	Margin of error	Adam Kinzinger	Don Manzullo	Undecided
We Ask America	March 11–12, 2012	1,605	± 2.44%	42%	43%	15%
We Ask America	February 19–20, 2012	1,395	± 2.62%	47%	34%	19%

==== Primary results ====
2012 Republican primary results by county Kinzinger: 50–60%; 70–80%; 80–90%; Manzullo: 60–70%; 70–80%

Republican primary results
Party	Candidate	Votes	%
Republican	Adam Kinzinger (incumbent)	45,546	53.9
Republican	Don Manzullo (Incumbent)	38,889	46.1
Total votes		84,435	100.0

=== Democratic primary ===
==== Candidates ====
===== Nominee =====
- Wanda Rohl, social worker

=== Independents ===
Bronco Bojovic, a businessman, had planned to run as an Independent candidate but dropped out of the race in February 2012.

=== General election ===
==== Endorsements ====
Adam Kinzinger (R)

Organizations

- Campaign for Working Families
- National Right to Life Committee
- NRA Political Victory Fund
- United States Chamber of Commerce

==== Predictions ====
Source	Ranking	As of
The Cook Political Report	Safe R	November 5, 2012
Rothenberg	Safe R	November 2, 2012
Roll Call	Safe R	November 4, 2012
Sabato's Crystal Ball	Safe R	November 5, 2012
NY Times	Safe R	November 4, 2012
RCP	Safe R	November 4, 2012
The Hill	Safe R	November 4, 2012

==== Results ====
Illinois's 16th congressional district, 2012
Party	Candidate	Votes	%
Republican	Adam Kinzinger (incumbent)	181,789	61.8
Democratic	Wanda Rohl	112,301	38.2
Total votes		294,090	100.0
Republican hold			

== District 17 ==
2012 Illinois's 17th congressional district election
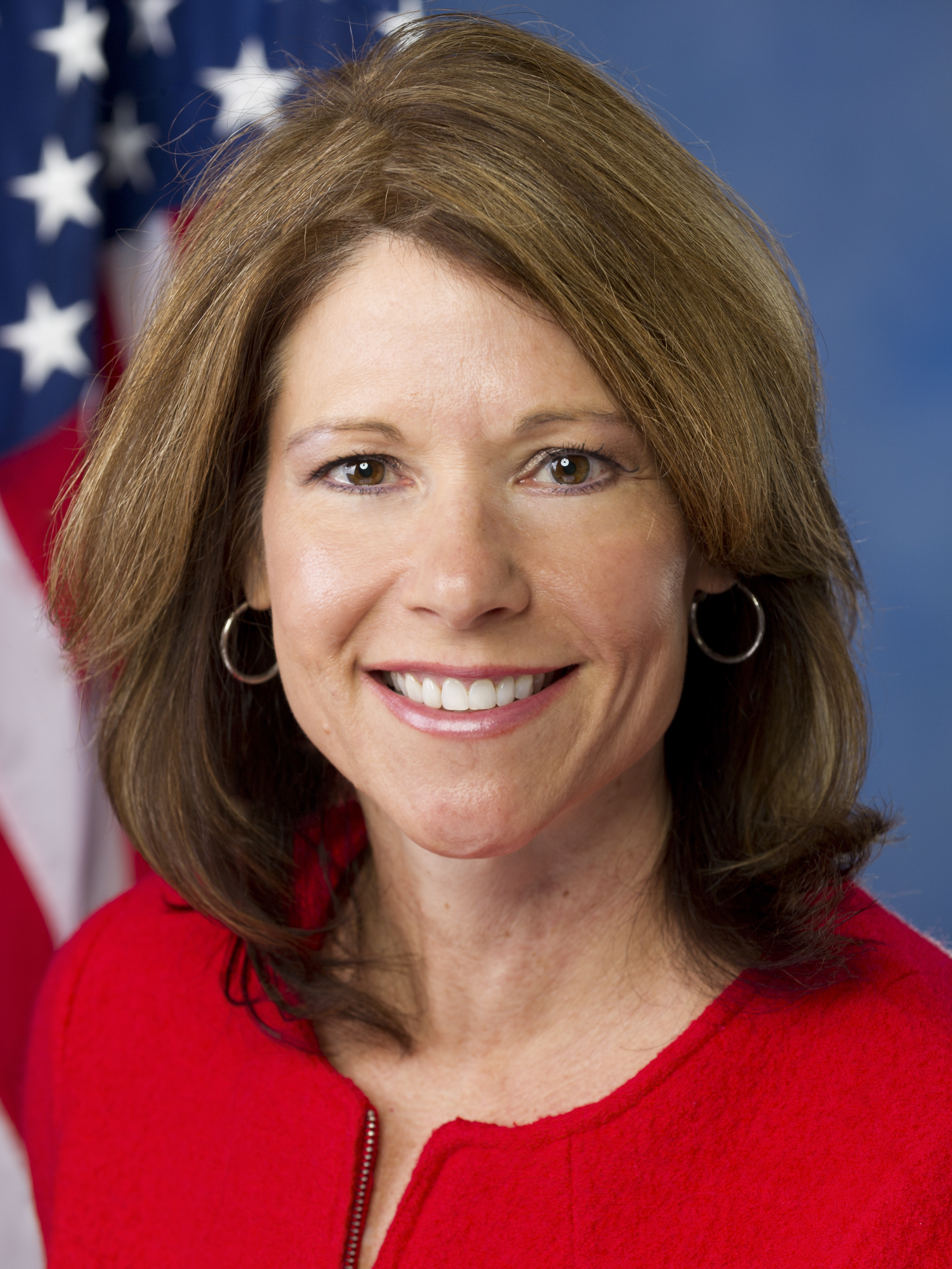

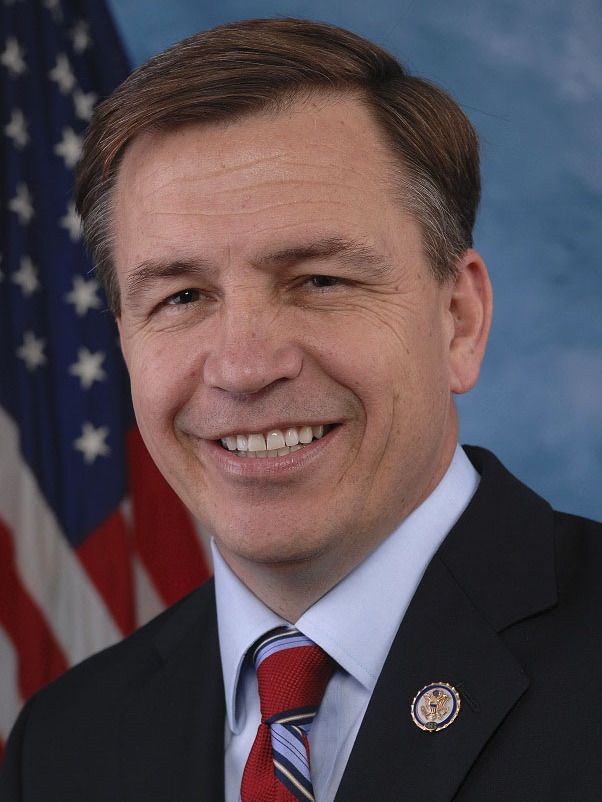
Nominee	Cheri Bustos	Bobby Schilling
Party	Democratic	Republican
Popular vote	153,519	134,623
Percentage	53.3%	46.7%
- County results Bustos: 50–60% 60–70% Schilling: 50–60%
U.S. Representative before election
Bobby Schilling
Republican
Elected U.S. Representative
Cheri Bustos
Democratic

The 17th district, based in Rock Island and Moline, was extended to include most of Rockford and the more Democratic areas of Peoria and Tazewell County, thereby making it more favorable to Democrats. Republican Bobby Schilling, who had represented the district since January 2011, ran for re-election.

=== Republican primary ===
==== Candidates ====
===== Nominee =====
- Bobby Schilling, incumbent U.S. representative

==== Primary results ====
Republican primary results
Party	Candidate	Votes	%
Republican	Bobby Schilling (incumbent)	46,263	100.0
Total votes		46,623	100.0

=== Democratic primary ===
==== Candidates ====
===== Nominee =====
- Cheri Bustos, East Moline alderwoman

===== Eliminated in primary =====
- Greg Aguilar, director of multicultural services at Augustana College
- George Gaulrapp, mayor of Freeport

===== Withdrawn =====
- Eric Reyes, attorney

===== Declined =====
- Mike Boland, former state representative
- Phil Hare, former U.S. representative
- Dave Koehler, state senator
- Porter McNeill, activist
- Mark Schwiebert, former mayor of Rock Island

==== Endorsements ====
Cheri Bustos

Newspapers

- Chicago Tribune

==== Primary results ====
Democratic primary results
Party	Candidate	Votes	%
Democratic	Cheri Bustos	18,652	54.4
Democratic	George Gaulrupp	8,838	25.8
Democratic	Greg Aguilar	6,798	19.8
Total votes		34,288	100.0

=== General election ===
==== Endorsements ====
Bobby Schilling (R)

Organizations

- National Republican Congressional Committee "Patriot" Program
- National Right to Life Committee
- NRA Political Victory Fund
- Susan B. Anthony List
- Tea Party Express
- United States Chamber of Commerce

Newspapers

- Chicago Tribune
Cheri Bustos (D)

Labor unions

- AFL-CIO
- National Association of Letter Carriers
- National Education Association
- United Steelworkers

Organizations

- Council for a Livable World
- Democratic Congressional Campaign Committee "Red to Blue" Program
- EMILY's List
- Feminist Majority
- J Street
- NARAL Pro-Choice America
- National Organization for Women
- Planned Parenthood Action Fund
- Sierra Club

==== Debates ====
- Complete video of debate, October 25, 2012

==== Polling ====
Poll source	Date(s) administered	Sample size	Margin of error	Bobby Schilling (R)	Cheri Bustos (D)	Undecided
We Ask America	October 28, 2012	1,325 (LV)	± 2.8%	52%	48%	-
GBA Strategies (D-Bustos)	October 16–18, 2012	450 (LV)	± 4.6%	45%	49%	9%
Public Opinion Strategies (R-Schilling)	October 14–15, 2012	400 (LV)	± 4.9%	51%	44%	5%
We Ask America	October 9, 2012	1,183 (LV)	± 2.9%	46%	46%	8%
Anzalone Liszt Research (D-DCCC)	October 2–4, 2012	400 (LV)	± 4.9%	44%	45%	11%
GBA Strategies (D-Bustos)	September 24–26, 2012	600 (LV)	± 4.0%	47%	45%	8%
Public Opinion Strategies (R-Schilling)	August 8–9, 2012	400 (LV)	± 4.9%	50%	37%	13%
Public Opinion Strategies (R-Schilling)	May 20–22, 2012	400 (LV)	± 4.9%	51%	35%	14%
GBA Strategies (D-Bustos)	January 29–February 1, 2012	400 (LV)	± 4.0%	44%	35%	21%

==== Predictions ====
Source	Ranking	As of
The Cook Political Report	Tossup	November 5, 2012
Rothenberg	Tossup	November 2, 2012
Roll Call	Tossup	November 4, 2012
Sabato's Crystal Ball	Lean D (flip)	November 5, 2012
NY Times	Lean D (flip)	November 4, 2012
RCP	Tossup	November 4, 2012
The Hill	Lean D (flip)	November 4, 2012

==== Results ====
Illinois's 17th congressional district election results, 2012
Party	Candidate	Votes	%
Democratic	Cheri Bustos	153,519	53.3
Republican	Bobby Schilling (incumbent)	134,623	46.7
Independent	Eric Reyes (write-in)	10	0.0
Independent	Joe Faber (write-in)	9	0.0
Total votes		288,161	100.0
Democratic gain from Republican			

== District 18 ==
2012 Illinois's 18th congressional district election
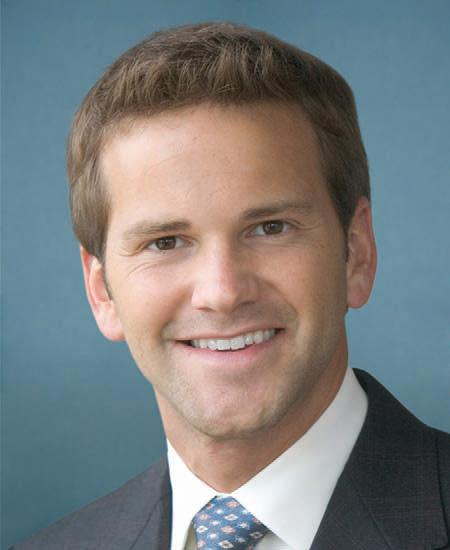

Nominee	Aaron Schock	Steve Waterworth
Party	Republican	Democratic
Popular vote	244,467	85,164
Percentage	74.2%	25.8%
- County results Schock: 60–70% 70–80% 80–90%
U.S. Representative before election
Aaron Schock
Republican
Elected U.S. Representative
Aaron Schock
Republican

Republican Aaron Schock, who had represented the 18th district since 2009, ran for and won re-election. The district was one of two which were expected to remain strongly favorable to Republicans. Peoria's more Democratic southern portion was shifted to the 17th district, and was replaced by the heavily Republican Bloomington-Normal and Quincy areas.

=== Republican primary ===
==== Candidates ====
===== Nominee =====
- Aaron Schock, incumbent U.S. representative

===== Disqualified =====
- Darrel Miller, farmer; removed from the ballot by the Illinois Board of Elections in February 2012

==== Primary results ====
Republican primary results
Party	Candidate	Votes	%
Republican	Aaron Schock (incumbent)	87,441	100.0
Total votes		87,441	100.0

=== Democratic primary ===
==== Candidates ====
===== Nominee =====
- Steve Waterworth, farmer and former master sergeant in the Air Force and Air National Guard

===== Eliminated in primary =====
- Matthew Woodmancy, restaurant manager

==== Primary results ====
Democratic primary results
Party	Candidate	Votes	%
Democratic	Steve Waterworth	10,211	69.6
Democratic	Matthew Woodmancy	4,465	30.4
Total votes		14,676	100.0

=== General election ===
==== Endorsements ====
Aaron Schock (R)

Labor unions

- National Association of Letter Carriers
- National Education Association

Organizations

- Campaign for Working Families
- National Right to Life Committee
- NRA Political Victory Fund
- United States Chamber of Commerce
Steve Waterworth (D)

Labor unions

- AFL-CIO
- United Steelworkers

==== Predictions ====
Source	Ranking	As of
The Cook Political Report	Safe R	November 5, 2012
Rothenberg	Safe R	November 2, 2012
Roll Call	Safe R	November 4, 2012
Sabato's Crystal Ball	Safe R	November 5, 2012
NY Times	Safe R	November 4, 2012
RCP	Safe R	November 4, 2012
The Hill	Safe R	November 4, 2012

==== Results ====
Illinois's 18th congressional district, 2012
Party	Candidate	Votes	%
Republican	Aaron Schock (incumbent)	244,467	74.2
Democratic	Steve Waterworth	85,164	25.8
Total votes		329,631	100.0
Republican hold			
