= International Breast Cancer Research Foundation =

Defunct nonprofit organization

The International Breast Cancer Research Foundation (IBCRF) was a nonprofit organization based in Madison, Wisconsin, that conducted and supported clinical research on breast cancer. It was established in 1993 and ceased operations on July 1, 2015.

== History ==
The International Breast Cancer Research Foundation was founded in 1993 and aimed to conduct clinical research intended to improve breast cancer treatment and care in countries with limited resources. Peer-reviewed research conducted by the IBCRF was funded by organizations such as the National Institutes of Health, Susan G. Komen for the Cure, and the Breast Cancer Research Foundation.

Changes in the National Institutes of Health and National Cancer Institute funding policies for international projects contributed to the dissolution of the organization. The IBCRF board and scientific director agreed to close the organization on July 1, 2015. Following closure, the IBCRF tissues sample bank was given at no cost to the University of North Carolina, Breast Cancer Research Program.

== Research and awards ==
Research conducted by the IBCRF included clinical studies of breast cancer treatment, particularly among premenopausal women in developing countries. Its scientific director, Richard R. Love, was awarded the Westerman Prize in Clinical Research Ethics by the American Federation for Medical Research in 1997.

Selected published works include:

- Love, R.R., Young, G.S., Laudico, A.V., Dinh, N.V. et al. : Bone mineral density changes following surgical oophorectomy and tamoxifen adjuvant therapy for operable breast cancer in pre-menopausal Filipino and Vietnamese women. Cancer 2013; 119:3746-52.
- Love, R.R., Laudico, A.V., Dinh, N.V. et al.: Timing of adjuvant surgical oophorectomy in the menstrual cycle and disease-free and overall survival in premenopausal women with operable breast cancer. Journal of the National Cancer Institute 2015 107 (3): djv064 doi: 10.1093/jnci/djv064
- Love, R. R., Hossain, S.M., Hussain, M. et al.: Luteal versus follicular phase surgical oophorectomy plus tamoxifen in premenopausal women with metastatic hormone receptor positive breast cancer. Euro J Cancer 2016. 60:107-116. https://dx.doi.org/10.1016/j.ejca.2016.03.011
- Love, R.R., Ferdousy, T., Paudel, B.D., Nahar, S., Dowla, R., Adibuzzaman, M., Ahsan, G.M.T., Uddin, M., Salim, R., and Ahamed, S.I.: Symptom levels in care-seeking Bangladeshi and Nepalese adults with advanced cancer. J Global Oncology July 27, 2016, doi:10.1200/JGO.2016.004119
- Love, R.R.: Adjuvant surgical oophorectomy plus tamoxifen in premenopausal women with operable breast cancer: a global treatment option. Clin Breast Cancer 2016.16: 233-7. https://dx.doi.org/10.1016/j.clbc.2016.03.003.
- Hart, C.D.*, Tenori, L.*, Vignoli, A., Uy, G., To, V.T., Adebamowo, C., Biganzoli, L. Risi, E., Love, R.R.**, Luchinat, C.,**, Di Leo, A.** (*Co-first authors; **Co-senior authors) Serum metabolomic profiles identify early breast cancer patients at increased risk of disease recurrence in a multicenter population. Clinical Cancer Research 2017. DOI: 10.1158/1078-0432.CCR-16-1153
