= Raymond Wardingley =

American politician (1935–2024)

Personal details
- Born: February 13, 1935 Chicago, Illinois, U.S.
- Died: October 29, 2024 (aged 89) Chicago, Illinois, U.S.
- Party: Republican

Raymond G. Wardingley (February 13, 1935 – October 29, 2024) was an American perennial candidate who many times, unsuccessfully, sought office in Chicago, Illinois. He is most famous for having been the Republican nominee in the 1995 Chicago mayoral election, and for having previously performed as a clown under the name "Spanky the Clown".

The embarrassment that many in the Republican party felt about Wardingley having been their party's 1995 standard-bearer in the Chicago mayoral election has been cited as a reason why a Republican-led Illinois General Assembly and Republican governor passed into law legislation that made all subsequent Chicago mayoral elections nonpartisan.

== Early life ==
Wardingley was born at Cook County Hospital on February 13, 1935, to Albert and Thelma Wardingley. He was the sixth child born of ten children. His family lived on the Southeast Side of Chicago and were poor. After his parents separated, he and a number of his siblings were sent to catholic orphanages. He attended Mendel and Chicago Vocational High Schools, but did not graduate high school. He later obtained a high school diploma. He later attended Goodman Theatre School.

== Career ==
Per his official biography, Wardingley enlisted in the United States Air Force in 1955 at age 20, but was given a medical discharge two years later, in 1957, after an eardrum was injured in an accident.

Wardingley worked numerous jobs, including taxi and limousine driver, a taxi dispatcher, steel mill worker, stagehand at movie studios in California, a motion picture extra, as well as an actor in commercials. Wardingley also performed as a part-time clown under the name "Spanky the Clown", a fact which attracted attention during his later turn as the Republican Party's Chicago mayoral nominee. He sometimes performed as Spanky the Clown at Chicago Sting games. He also would sometimes fill-in at their games as their mascot Stanley Sting. He created Spanky the Clown to entertain children with cancer at St. Jude Children's Research Hospital. He also performed as Spanky the Clown to raise money for St. Jude and other causes. During his 1979 Republican mayoral primary campaign, he performed as Spanky the Clown to raise money for St. Jude Children's Research Hospital. He was described by The New York Times in 1979 as a "part-time taxi driver who is a professional clown". By the time of his 1995 mayoral campaign, he had retired from clowning.

Wardingley managed his local neighborhood watch from 1989 to 1995.

=== Political career ===
Wardingley was a perennial candidate. He was never elected to any of the numerous offices he sought.

Politically, he identified himself as a Reagan Republican. Wardingley co-founded the Coalition for Restoring Social Standards (C.R.O.S.S.). From 2005, he was a member of the Illinois Right Coalition.

In 2004, Wardingley launched an effort to try and persuade Cardinal Francis George to excommunicate Chicago mayor Richard M. Daley, after Daley publicly supported same-sex marriage.

==== Mayoral campaigns ====
Wardingley unsuccessfully ran in the Republican primary elections for the 1979, 1983, 1987. In 1983, he failed to get on the ballot due to issues with his ballot petition. He also once ran as a write-in in a general election, garnering only a single vote.

In 1995 Wardingley narrowly won the Republican primary, thereby becoming the party's nominee for mayor of Chicago. The Republican field in the primary was regarded as weak. This was Wardingley's fourth mayoral campaign. However, his victory in the primary was nonetheless considered surprising. His platform included abolishing the Chicago Board of Education, eliminating the employment-based head tax, eliminating desegregation busing, and eliminating bilingual education. He supported school prayer, making inspections of nursing homes stricter, firing many government officials and replacing them with "senior citizens, disabled veterans, Americans, at $10,000 a year." Wardingley also supported increasing the number of veterans' parades. He spoke about wanting to sentence "drug pushers" to life imprisonment and possibly castration or death by hanging. Wardingley characterized himself as someone capable of relating to working class voters, and hoped that by running he would help keep a two-party system alive in a city so dominated by Democrats. Wardingley's candidacy was not taken seriously by many. Many Republicans stayed silent on the mayoral race, rather than endorsing, and a few even went as far as endorsing Democratic incumbent Richard M. Daley over Wardingley. His campaign manager was Ted Lauterbach. The fact he had performed as a clown garnered great attention. He ultimately only garnered 2.77% of the vote in the general election.

Wardingley's mayoral nomination was seen as an embarrassment for the local Republican Party. This has been viewed as the impetus for state Republicans leading the charge to reform Chicago's mayoral election system from a partisan election to a nonpartisan election. This was passed by the then-Republican controlled Illinois Senate and Illinois House of Representatives and signed by Republican governor Jim Edgar later in 1995.

==== 1999 aldermanic campaign ====
In 1999, Wardingley ran against incumbent Chicago Alderman Ginger Rugai for her 19th ward seat on the Chicago City Council.

==== U.S. congressional campaigns ====
Wardingley ran in 2000 for Illinois's 1st congressional district, winning the Republican nomination unopposed. He lost to incumbent Democrat Bobby Rush, who garnered 87.8% of the vote to Wardingley's 12.2%. He again ran as the Republican nominee against Rush in Illinois's 1st congressional district in 2002 and 2004. During his 2002 campaign he signed the Americans for Tax Reform's Taxpayer Protection Pledge.

In 2006 he ran as the Republican nominee against incumbent Democrat Dan Lipinski in Illinois's 3rd congressional district. In 2006, Republican leadership expressed embarrassment that the only two candidates running in the Republican primary were Wardingley and white supremacist perennial candidate Arthur J. Jones. On the campaign trail that year, Wardingley refused to shake hands with Jones, saying, "I won't shake the hand that represents the same thing Hitler represented".

Wardingley again ran for Illinois's 1st congressional district as the Republican nominee in 2010. He tried to run again for the 1st congressional district in 2012, but was removed from the ballot.

As a candidate, Wardingley expressed support for a "FairTax".

==== 2008 state senate campaign ====
In 2008, he ran against Emil Jones III for the 14th district Illinois Senate seat. The district was heavily Democratic. Wardingly lost by a large margin.

Originally, Emil Jones Jr. was his Democratic opponent, but Jones opted to retire and withdraw from the race, and his son was selected to replace him on the ballot.

== Personal life and death ==
Wardingley was married to his wife Karen. He was a Roman Catholic. As of 2006, he was living in the Morgan Park neighborhood of Chicago.

Wardingley was a second degree freemason. In 2001, Wardingley became a member of Veterans of Foreign Wars. He also was a member of the American Legion since 2001.

Wardingley died on October 29, 2024, at the age of 89.

== Electoral history ==
=== Chicago mayor ===
1979

1979 Chicago Republican Party mayoral primary
Candidate	Votes	%
Wallace D. Johnson	18,268	86.39
Raymond G. Wardingley	2,877	13.61
Total	21,144	100.00

1987

data needed

1995

1995 Chicago mayoral Republican primary results
Party	Candidate	Votes	%
Republican	Raymond Wardingley	2,438	28.2
Republican	Larry P. Horist	2,354	27.2
Republican	Saturnino Noriega	1,995	23.1
Republican	William J. Grutzmacher	1,579	18.2
Republican	Kimball Ladien	288	3.3
Total votes		8,654	100.00

1995 Chicago mayoral election
Party	Candidate	Votes	%
Democratic	Richard M. Daley (incumbent)	359,466	60.09
Independent	Roland W. Burris	217,024	36.28
Republican	Raymond Wardingley	16,568	2.77
Harold Washington	Lawrence C. Redmond	5,160	0.86
Total votes		598,218	100.00

=== Chicago City Council ===
1999 Chicago 19th Ward aldermanic election
Candidate	Votes	%
Virginia Rugai (incumbent)	17,090	84.13
Ray Wardingly	3,223	15.87
Total votes	20,313	100

*Uncertified results published in the Chicago Tribune on February 24, 1999

=== United States House of Representatives ===
2000 Illinois' 1st congressional district Republican primary
Party	Candidate	Votes	%
Republican	Raymond G. Wardingly	2,721	100.00
Total votes		2,721	100.00

2000 Illinois' 1st congressional district election
Party	Candidate	Votes	%
Democratic	Bobby Rush (incumbent)	172,271	87.81
Republican	Raymond G. Wardingly	23,915	12.19
Total votes		196,186	100.00
Democratic hold			

2002 Illinois' 1st congressional district Republican primary
Party	Candidate	Votes	%
Republican	Raymond G. Wardingly	9,430	100.00
Total votes		9,430	100.00

2002 Illinois' 1st congressional district election
Party	Candidate	Votes	%
Democratic	Bobby Rush (incumbent)	149,068	81.17
Republican	Raymond G. Wardingly	29,776	16.21
Libertarian	Dorothy G. Tsatsos	4,812	2,62
Total votes		183,656	100.00
Democratic hold			

2004 Illinois' 1st congressional district Republican primary
Party	Candidate	Votes	%
Republican	Raymond G. Wardingly	7,190	100.00
Total votes		7,190	100.00

2004 Illinois' 1st congressional district election
Party	Candidate	Votes	%
Democratic	Bobby Rush (incumbent)	212,109	84.86
Republican	Raymond G. Wardingly	37,840	15.14
Total votes		249,949	100.00
Democratic hold			

2006 Illinois's 3rd congressional Republican primary
Party	Candidate	Votes	%
Republican	Raymond G. Wardingly	12,603	70.62
Republican	Arthur J. Jones	5,242	29.37
Write-in	Richard Benedict Mayers	2	0.00
Total votes		17,847	100.00

2006 Illinois's 3rd congressional district election
Party	Candidate	Votes	%
Democratic	Dan Lipinski (incumbent)	127,768	77.10
Republican	Raymond G. Wardingley	37,954	22.90
Total votes		165,722	100.00
Democratic hold			

=== State senate ===
2008 Illinois' 14th State Senate district election
Party	Candidate	Votes	%
Democratic	Emil Jones III	76,090	80.08
Republican	Ray Wardingley	18,929	19.92
Total votes		95,019	100.00
Democratic hold			
