= 1995 Chicago mayoral election =

- April 4, 1995
- Turnout: 42.25% ▼2.75 pp
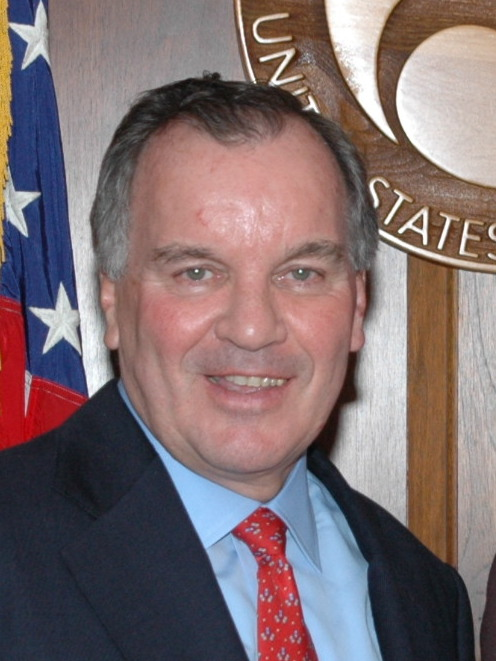

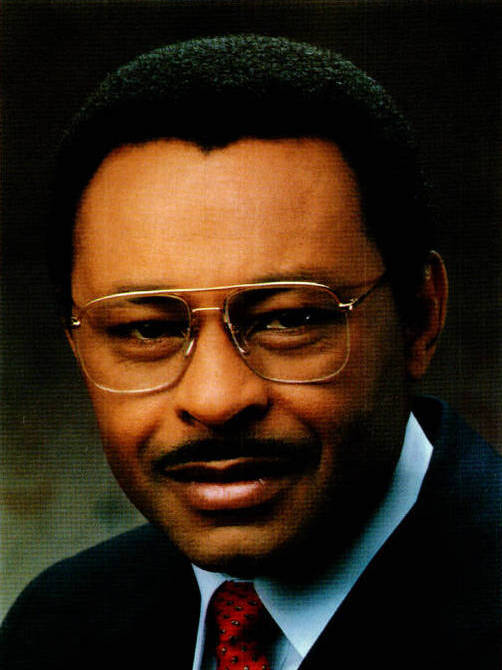
Nominee	Richard M. Daley	Roland Burris
Party	Democratic	Independent
Popular vote	359,466	217,024
Percentage	60.09%	36.28%
- Ward results
Mayor before election
Richard M. Daley
Democratic
Elected Mayor
Richard M. Daley
Democratic

The Chicago mayoral election of 1995 resulted in the re-election of Democratic Party nominee incumbent Richard M. Daley over independent candidate Roland Burris, with 359,466 votes to Burris's 217,024. Daley won 60.1% of the total vote, winning by a landslide 24-point margin. The Republican candidate, Raymond Wardingley, fared poorly with only 2.8% of the vote. A fourth-place candidate, Harold Washington Party nominee Lawrence Redmond, won 0.9% of the votes.

This was the last election for Mayor of Chicago where candidates ran under party labels, as a state law was enacted later in 1995 making all municipal offices in the state non-partisan.

The Democratic Party, Republican Party, and the Harold Washington Party all held primary elections for their nominations. However, only the Democratic Party's primary saw a sizeable number of voters participate. Daley easily defeated Metropolitan Water Reclamation District of Greater Chicago Commissioner Joseph E. Gardiner by a margin of more that 30 points. Wardingley, a perennial candidate and clown, very narrowly won the Republican nomination among a weak field of contenders. Redmond was unopposed for the Harold Washington Party primary.

== Democratic primary ==
=== Candidates ===
- Richard M. Daley, incumbent mayor
- Joseph E. Gardner, Metropolitan Water Reclamation District of Greater Chicago commissioner and PUSH executive
- Sheila A. Jones, perennial candidate

Declined to run

The following were speculated as prospective candidates, but did not run:

- Bobby Rush, U.S. congressman
- David Orr, Cook County clerk and former acting mayor
- Alice Palmer, state senator
- John Steele, 6th ward alderman
- Dorothy Tillman, 3rd ward alderman

=== Campaign ===
Daley easily defeated two challengers in the primary.

Daley's main challenge came from Metropolitan Water Reclamation District of Greater Chicago commissioner Joseph E. Gardner. Gardner had been a high-ranking member of Harold Washington's mayoral administration and an executive at PUSH. By 1995, Sheila A. Jones had become a perennial competitor in the Democratic mayoral primary.

As was the case in all of his reelection campaigns, Daley did not attend any debates.

Daley vastly out-raised his opponents in campaign funds.

=== Endorsements ===
Richard M. Daley

Officeholders

- Carol Moseley Braun, United States Senator

Individuals

- Clay Evans, pastor

=== Results ===
Map of the Democratic primary by ward

Democratic primary results
Party	Candidate	Votes	%
Democratic	Richard M. Daley (incumbent)	348,153	65.79
Democratic	Joseph E. Gardner	174,943	33.06
Democratic	Sheila A. Jones	6,067	1.15
Total votes		529,163	

==== Results by ward ====
Daley won a majority of the vote in 31 wards. Gardner won a majority of the vote in the remaining 19 wards.

Results by ward

Ward	Richard M. Daley		Joseph E. Gardner		Sheila A. Jones		Total
Ward	Votes	%	Votes	%	Votes	%	Votes
1	5,459	80.3%	1,231	18.1%	111	1.6%	6,801
2	3,582	37.2%	5,814	60.4%	228	2.4%	9,624
3	2,194	24.6%	6,498	73.0%	210	2.4%	8,902
4	3,563	32.9%	7,093	65.5%	176	1.6%	10,832
5	3,733	34.0%	7,124	64.8%	136	1.2%	10,993
6	3,287	22.7%	11,082	76.4%	143	1.0%	14,512
7	2,891	28.5%	7,109	70.1%	146	1.4%	10,146
8	3,775	24.5%	11,484	74.5%	165	1.1%	15,424
9	2,252	21.2%	8,264	77.7%	122	1.1%	10,638
10	9,979	85.6%	1,565	13.4%	116	1.0%	11,660
11	14,571	95.8%	561	3.7%	84	0.6%	15,216
12	4,306	92.1%	314	6.7%	56	1.2%	4,676
13	19,414	96.3%	653	3.2%	96	0.5%	20,163
14	10,270	95.7%	405	3.8%	62	0.6%	10,737
15	2,581	32.8%	5,144	65.5%	132	1.7%	7,857
16	2,383	35.6%	4,144	62.0%	161	2.4%	6,688
17	2,323	23.4%	7,463	75.1%	150	1.5%	9,936
18	11,731	62.7%	6,816	36.4%	163	0.9%	18,710
19	16,192	85.5%	2,655	14.0%	83	0.4%	18,930
20	2,371	25.4%	6,835	73.1%	140	1.5%	9,346
21	3,250	22.7%	10,889	76.1%	162	1.1%	14,301
22	3,733	69.0%	1,597	29.5%	80	1.5%	5,410
23	20,287	94.6%	1,000	4.7%	164	0.8%	21,451
24	2,149	24.8%	6,330	72.9%	199	2.3%	8,678
25	4,828	87.5%	618	11.2%	69	1.3%	5,515
26	5,404	83.4%	979	15.1%	98	1.5%	6,481
27	3,806	42.9%	4,898	55.2%	168	1.9%	8,872
28	1,871	24.0%	5,780	74.3%	130	1.7%	7,781
29	3,240	36.2%	5,525	61.8%	182	2.0%	8,947
30	9,090	94.1%	481	5.0%	86	0.9%	9,657
31	5,533	89.7%	574	9.3%	59	1.0%	6,166
32	7,381	88.1%	914	10.9%	87	1.0%	8,382
33	6,673	91.2%	572	7.8%	74	1.0%	7,319
34	2,947	23.3%	9,472	74.9%	223	1.8%	12,642
35	6,365	84.7%	1,043	13.9%	106	1.4%	7,514
36	12,510	91.6%	1,057	7.7%	84	0.6%	13,651
37	3,191	36.0%	5,533	62.5%	132	1.5%	8,856
38	13,697	94.6%	672	4.6%	106	0.7%	14,475
39	9,748	92.0%	737	7.0%	108	1.0%	10,593
40	6,953	88.0%	871	11.0%	75	0.9%	7,899
41	14,384	92.7%	1,007	6.5%	126	0.8%	15,517
42	9,511	86.3%	1,428	13.0%	82	0.7%	11,021
43	7,525	88.6%	912	10.7%	56	0.7%	8,493
44	6,897	86.8%	986	12.4%	60	0.8%	7,943
45	14,863	93.9%	833	5.3%	127	0.8%	15,823
46	7,119	71.2%	2,680	26.8%	198	2.0%	9,997
47	8,627	88.5%	1,011	10.4%	109	1.1%	9,747
48	5,970	77.2%	1,699	22.0%	65	0.8%	7,734
49	4,105	67.7%	1,858	30.6%	99	1.6%	6,062
50	9,639	92.3%	733	7.0%	73	0.7%	10,445
Total	348,153	65.8%	174,943	33.1%	6,067	1.1%	529,163

== Republican primary ==
Raymond Wardingley narrowly won the Republican nomination.

The Republican field was regarded as weak. Wardingly had worked as a clown under the name "Spanky the Clown". He had thrice before run for mayor.

Candidates Themis Anagost (an attorney), Leon Beard, and Raymond Lear had been denied inclusion on the ballot due to issues with their petitions.

=== Results ===
Republican primary results
Party	Candidate	Votes	%
Republican	Raymond Wardingley	2,438	28.2
Republican	Larry P. Horist	2,354	27.2
Republican	Saturnino Noriega	1,995	23.1
Republican	William J. Grutzmacher	1,579	18.2
Republican	Kimball Ladien	288	3.3
Total votes		8,654	

==== Results by ward ====
Results by ward

Ward	Raymond Wardingley		Larry P. Horist		Saturnino Nino Noriega		William J. Grutzmacher		Kimball Ladien		Total
1	34	30.1%	25	22.1%	30	26.5%	21	18.6%	3	2.7%	113
2	39	24.1%	59	36.4%	39	24.1%	18	11.1%	7	4.3%	162
3	27	58.7%	5	10.9%	7	15.2%	5	10.9%	2	4.3%	46
4	25	34.7%	14	19.4%	23	31.9%	9	12.5%	1	1.4%	72
5	30	30.6%	30	30.6%	25	25.5%	12	12.2%	1	1.0%	98
6	35	46.7%	15	20.0%	14	18.7%	9	12.0%	2	2.7%	75
7	21	33.3%	20	31.7%	14	22.2%	8	12.7%	0	0.0%	63
8	31	35.2%	18	20.5%	27	30.7%	10	11.4%	2	2.3%	88
9	13	35.1%	11	29.7%	9	24.3%	3	8.1%	1	2.7%	37
10	86	25.4%	92	27.2%	66	19.5%	88	26.0%	6	1.8%	338
11	36	27.9%	42	32.6%	23	17.8%	24	18.6%	4	3.1%	129
12	20	29.0%	12	17.4%	22	31.9%	13	18.8%	2	2.9%	69
13	53	26.2%	67	33.2%	37	18.3%	42	20.8%	3	1.5%	202
14	31	22.3%	33	23.7%	37	26.6%	31	22.3%	7	5.0%	139
15	27	42.2%	19	29.7%	13	20.3%	4	6.2%	1	1.6%	64
16	20	41.7%	6	12.5%	11	22.9%	8	16.7%	3	6.2%	48
17	23	40.4%	14	24.6%	16	28.1%	4	7.0%	0	0.0%	57
18	38	29.5%	38	29.5%	26	20.2%	24	18.6%	3	2.3%	129
19	75	33.8%	56	25.2%	38	17.1%	48	21.6%	5	2.3%	222
20	26	38.8%	8	11.9%	23	34.3%	8	11.9%	2	3.0%	67
21	24	38.1%	9	14.3%	14	22.2%	14	22.2%	2	3.2%	63
22	20	32.8%	4	6.6%	28	45.9%	7	11.5%	2	3.3%	61
23	76	31.9%	54	22.7%	47	19.7%	55	23.1%	6	2.5%	238
24	13	43.3%	7	23.3%	6	20.0%	3	10.0%	1	3.3%	30
25	22	25.9%	15	17.6%	37	43.5%	9	10.6%	2	2.4%	85
26	28	29.2%	16	16.7%	36	37.5%	15	15.6%	1	1.0%	96
27	84	38.2%	47	21.4%	55	25.0%	26	11.8%	8	3.6%	220
28	13	30.2%	8	18.6%	15	34.9%	5	11.6%	2	4.7%	43
29	31	33.3%	22	23.7%	26	28.0%	8	8.6%	6	6.5%	93
30	75	30.2%	55	22.2%	61	24.6%	50	20.2%	7	2.8%	248
31	33	25.2%	30	22.9%	45	34.4%	20	15.3%	3	2.3%	131
32	45	23.2%	57	29.4%	48	24.7%	38	19.6%	6	3.1%	194
33	37	23.6%	43	27.4%	35	22.3%	30	19.1%	12	7.6%	157
34	30	46.2%	9	13.8%	20	30.8%	3	4.6%	3	4.6%	65
35	48	27.0%	32	18.0%	54	30.3%	36	20.2%	8	4.5%	178
36	67	25.4%	114	43.2%	33	12.5%	42	15.9%	8	3.0%	264
37	13	31.0%	8	19.0%	16	38.1%	5	11.9%	0	0.0%	42
38	93	28.0%	98	29.5%	49	14.8%	82	24.7%	10	3.0%	332
39	65	26.0%	70	28.0%	56	22.4%	47	18.8%	12	4.8%	250
40	46	22.5%	74	36.3%	46	22.5%	32	15.7%	6	2.9%	204
41	164	23.6%	211	30.4%	122	17.6%	181	26.0%	17	2.4%	695
42	152	24.6%	183	29.6%	158	25.5%	101	16.3%	25	4.0%	619
43	96	28.3%	103	30.4%	78	23.0%	41	12.1%	21	6.2%	339
44	68	23.6%	87	30.2%	71	24.7%	47	16.3%	15	5.2%	288
45	102	27.5%	148	39.9%	46	12.4%	71	19.1%	4	1.1%	371
46	95	32.4%	55	18.8%	76	25.9%	55	18.8%	12	4.1%	293
47	43	20.5%	40	19.0%	59	28.1%	56	26.7%	12	5.7%	210
48	67	24.5%	90	32.8%	64	23.4%	42	15.3%	11	4.0%	274
49	44	24.9%	44	24.9%	48	27.1%	34	19.2%	7	4.0%	177
50	54	30.7%	37	21.0%	46	26.1%	35	19.9%	4	2.3%	176
Total	2,438	28.2%	2,354	27.2%	1,995	23.1%	1,579	18.2%	288	3.3%	8,654

== Harold Washington Party primary ==
Lawrence C. Redmond went unopposed in the Harold Washington Party primary.

Candidates Phillip Morris and Ilene Smith had been denied inclusion on the ballot due to issues regarding their petitions.

=== Results ===
Harold Washington Party primary results
Party	Candidate	Votes	%
Harold Washington	Lawrence C. Redmond	1,383	100
Total votes		1,383	

==== Results by ward ====
Results by ward

Ward	Lawrence C. Redmond	
Ward	Votes	%
1	12	100.0%
2	44	100.0%
3	39	100.0%
4	54	100.0%
5	38	100.0%
6	52	100.0%
7	80	100.0%
8	68	100.0%
9	63	100.0%
10	9	100.0%
11	3	100.0%
12	2	100.0%
13	3	100.0%
14	6	100.0%
15	64	100.0%
16	39	100.0%
17	58	100.0%
18	49	100.0%
19	30	100.0%
20	45	100.0%
21	75	100.0%
22	6	100.0%
23	2	100.0%
24	42	100.0%
25	6	100.0%
26	14	100.0%
27	59	100.0%
28	35	100.0%
29	36	100.0%
30	4	100.0%
31	3	100.0%
32	3	100.0%
33	5	100.0%
34	78	100.0%
35	13	100.0%
36	2	100.0%
37	78	100.0%
38	0	N/A
39	1	100.0%
40	9	100.0%
41	0	N/A
42	11	100.0%
43	7	100.0%
44	10	100.0%
45	2	100.0%
46	42	100.0%
47	11	100.0%
48	26	100.0%
49	42	100.0%
50	3	100.0%
Totals	1,383	100.0%

== Independent candidacy of Roland Burris ==
Roland Burris ran as an independent. When first approached by black activists about running for mayor, Burris had declined. He ultimately ran, proclaiming to have been drafted by “the people”. By the time he decided to run, Joseph Gardner had already challenged Daley in the Democratic primary. Not wanting to run against Gardner and split the black vote in the primary, Burris decided he would run in the general election as an independent candidate.

== General election ==
Daley did not attend any debates. Burris complained of a lack of media coverage on his candidacy. Late into the campaign, Burris issued demands for Daley to address corruption and misconduct by aviation employees, especially Dominic Longo, the manager of vehicle operations at O’Hare. The airport had recently suffered a number of accidents caused by inexperienced runway crew leadership. Burris also alleged that Longo has coerced airport employees into making donations to the Daley campaign in order to keep their jobs. Daley's campaign spent $3 million in the election. Burris spent $250,000.

=== Endorsements ===
Richard M. Daley (Democrat)

Officeholders

- Carol Moseley Braun, United States Senator

=== Polls ===
Poll source	Date(s) administered	Sample size	Margin of error	Ronald Burris	Richard M. Daley	Raymond Wardingley
Chicago Tribune	March 1995			19%	57%	2%

=== Results ===
Daley won a majority of the vote in 31 of the city's 50 wards. Burris won a majority of the vote in the remaining 19 wards. In response to Wardingley's abysmal showing, the Republican-controlled Illinois General Assembly passed legislation creating a nonpartisan, runoff election system for citywide offices in Chicago. Public Act 89-0095 was signed into law by Governor Jim Edgar and went into effect for the 1999 Chicago mayoral election.

Mayor of Chicago 1995 (general election)
Party	Candidate	Votes	%
Democratic	Richard M. Daley (incumbent)	359,466	60.09
Independent	Roland W. Burris	217,024	36.28
Republican	Raymond Wardingley	16,568	2.77
Harold Washington	Lawrence C. Redmond	5,160	0.86
Turnout		598,218	

Results by ward

Ward	Richard M. Daley (Democratic Party)		Roland W. Burris (Independent)		Raymond Wardingley (Republican Party)		Lawrence C. Redmond (Harold Washington Party)		Total
Ward	Votes	%	Votes	%	Votes	%	Votes	%	Votes
1	6,105	79.0%	1,321	17.1%	188	2.4%	113	1.5%	7,727
2	3,564	30.6%	7,700	66.2%	174	1.5%	193	1.7%	11,631
3	1,974	19.3%	7,915	77.4%	99	1.0%	234	2.3%	10,222
4	3,044	26.7%	8,073	70.9%	106	0.9%	166	1.5%	11,389
5	3,735	27.7%	9,493	70.5%	110	0.8%	136	1.0%	13,474
6	2,644	15.2%	14,502	83.5%	57	0.3%	161	0.9%	17,364
7	2,440	20.3%	9,327	77.8%	93	0.8%	133	1.1%	11,993
8	3,106	17.2%	14,681	81.4%	65	0.4%	174	1.0%	18,026
9	1,874	14.5%	10,888	84.2%	54	0.4%	114	0.9%	12,930
10	11,304	81.3%	1,950	14.0%	585	4.2%	65	0.5%	13,904
11	15,565	94.2%	587	3.6%	331	2.0%	47	0.3%	16,530
12	3,566	91.0%	216	5.5%	107	2.7%	28	0.7%	3,917
13	20,701	92.6%	816	3.7%	794	3.6%	35	0.2%	22,346
14	11,308	93.2%	456	3.8%	329	2.7%	37	0.3%	12,130
15	2,528	26.4%	6,794	70.9%	109	1.1%	147	1.5%	9,578
16	2,301	28.5%	5,541	68.7%	69	0.9%	160	2.0%	8,071
17	1,889	16.1%	9,586	81.7%	68	0.6%	186	1.6%	11,729
18	10,949	54.4%	8,480	42.2%	548	2.7%	132	0.7%	20,109
19	17,149	77.7%	3,582	16.2%	1,293	5.9%	41	0.2%	22,065
20	2,067	20.5%	7,802	77.2%	63	0.6%	174	1.7%	10,106
21	2,620	14.9%	14,686	83.7%	54	0.3%	178	1.0%	17,538
22	2,608	59.2%	1,677	38.1%	59	1.3%	63	1.4%	4,407
23	20,043	90.7%	1,074	4.9%	929	4.2%	52	0.2%	22,098
24	1,621	18.1%	7,090	79.4%	70	0.8%	153	1.7%	8,934
25	4,033	85.1%	558	11.8%	108	2.3%	39	0.8%	4,738
26	4,696	80.2%	906	15.5%	190	3.2%	64	1.1%	5,856
27	4,281	39.4%	6,168	56.8%	220	2.0%	189	1.7%	10,858
28	1,635	17.6%	7,449	80.1%	60	0.6%	161	1.7%	9,305
29	3,377	30.4%	7,393	66.5%	152	1.4%	203	1.8%	11,125
30	11,019	89.3%	731	5.9%	538	4.4%	55	0.4%	12,343
31	4,970	85.7%	575	9.9%	196	3.4%	60	1.0%	5,801
32	8,307	86.3%	875	9.1%	383	4.0%	62	0.6%	9,627
33	7,217	88.2%	611	7.5%	307	3.8%	47	0.6%	8,182
34	2,613	17.2%	12,323	81.2%	82	0.5%	167	1.1%	15,185
35	6,872	82.7%	1,061	12.8%	261	3.1%	117	1.4%	8,311
36	15,021	87.7%	1,402	8.2%	665	3.9%	39	0.2%	17,127
37	2,027	23.2%	6,491	74.2%	79	0.9%	154	1.8%	8,751
38	13,773	90.0%	777	5.1%	717	4.7%	32	0.2%	15,299
39	10,784	87.1%	906	7.3%	614	5.0%	74	0.6%	12,378
40	8,325	85.2%	970	9.9%	412	4.2%	64	0.7%	9,771
41	16,253	85.5%	1,371	7.2%	1,345	7.1%	39	0.2%	19,008
42	10,229	83.0%	1,510	12.3%	515	4.2%	66	0.5%	12,320
43	8,457	86.4%	897	9.2%	394	4.0%	41	0.4%	9,789
44	8,782	86.3%	969	9.5%	352	3.5%	68	0.7%	10,171
45	15,580	89.0%	920	5.3%	949	5.4%	49	0.3%	17,498
46	6,036	69.7%	2,222	25.6%	302	3.5%	104	1.2%	8,664
47	9,384	86.2%	981	9.0%	440	4.0%	76	0.7%	10,881
48	7,172	74.0%	2,066	21.3%	342	3.5%	106	1.1%	9,686
49	4,016	63.8%	1,903	30.3%	260	4.1%	111	1.8%	6,290
50	9,902	89.7%	752	6.8%	331	3.0%	51	0.5%	11,036
Total	359,466	60.1%	217,024	36.3%	16,568	2.8%	5,160	0.9%	598,218
