= Illinois Senate career of Barack Obama =

Overview of Barack Obama's career in the Illinois Senate

Barack Obama
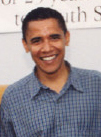
- Obama while a State Senator 1998

Member of the Illinois Senate from the 13th district
- In office January 8, 1997 – November 4, 2004
- Preceded by: Alice Palmer
- Succeeded by: Kwame Raoul

Barack Obama served three terms in the Illinois Senate from 1997 to 2004, when he was elected to the United States Senate. During this part of his career, Obama continued teaching constitutional law part time at the University of Chicago Law School as he had done as a Lecturer from 1992 to 1996, and as a Senior Lecturer from 1996 to 2004.

In 1994, Senator Alice Palmer decided to run for the United States House of Representatives, leaving the Senate's 13th district seat open. When filing opened in 1995 for her seat, Obama entered the race. Eventually, his challengers were disqualified and he won the Democratic primary unopposed in 1996. He won re-election in 1998 and 2002. During his Senate tenure, Obama was involved with a wide range of legislation.

While serving, he ran unsuccessfully for the United States House of Representatives in the 2000 elections. In the redistricting following the 2000 Census, the Democrats gained control of the Illinois Senate, and Obama became more active in his legislation, which included work in areas such as health care, labor, law enforcement, campaign finance reform, welfare, and community reinvestment.

== State elections ==
=== First state Senate election, 1996 ===
In November 1994, U.S. Representative Mel Reynolds was re-elected to Illinois's 2nd congressional district despite being indicted for sexual assault and sexual abuse. Both Alice Palmer, Illinois State Senator for the 13th district Illinois Senate seat, as well as Jesse Jackson, Jr., 29-year-old son of Jesse Jackson Sr., showed interest in challenging Reynolds for his seat in the 1996 Democratic primary election. Jackson Sr. approached Palmer with a deal: the Jacksons would support her bid for Congress while she would support Jackson Jr. as successor in the State Senate. However, Jackson Jr. rejected that plan and insisted on running for Reynolds's district.

After Reynolds was convicted in August 1995 and resigned his seat on October 1, Illinois Governor Jim Edgar set November 28 as the date for a special primary election to fill the vacancy. Palmer, who had officially launched her Congressional bid on June 27, introduced and endorsed Barack Obama of Hyde Park as her successor in her State Senate seat. On November 28 Jesse Jackson, Jr. won the special primary election. Palmer, who finished a distant third, stated she wouldn't seek re-election to the State Senate and was undecided about again challenging Jackson in the March 1996 primary.

Nominating petitions for the State Senate elections could be filed between December 11 and December 18, 1995. Obama filed his petition with more than 3,000 signatures on the first filing day, followed by a nominating petition by Ulmer Lynch, Jr. On the last filing day, nominating petitions were not only filed by first-time candidates Gha-is Askia and Marc Ewell but also by Palmer, who declared that she was seeking re-election to the State Senate after all, accepting a draft by more than 100 supporters.

On December 26, the Obama campaign filed objections to the legitimacy of the nominating petitions of Obama's competitors. On January 17, 1996, Palmer withdrew her bid for re-election after almost two-thirds of the 1,580 signatures on her nominating petitions were found to be invalid, leaving her 200 signatures short of the 757 needed to earn a place on the ballot. The Chicago Board of Election Commissioners had previously sustained an objection to the nominating petitions of Lynch and subsequently also sustained objections to the nominating petitions of Askia and Ewell, citing insufficient valid signatures in all three cases.

As a result, Obama won the Democratic nomination unopposed. On November 5, Obama won the race for the 13th Senate district, with 82 percent of the vote; Harold Washington Party candidate David Whitehead (13%) and first-time Republican Party candidate Rosette Caldwell Peyton (5%) also ran.

=== Second state Senate election, 1998 ===
Obama was up for re-election in 1998; Illinois state senators serve one two-year term and two four-year terms each decade. In the March 17 primary, Obama won re-nomination unopposed, and first-time candidate Yesse Yehudah won the Republican nomination unopposed. At the November 3 general election, Obama was re-elected to a four-year term as state senator for the 13th district with 89% of the vote; Yehudah received 11% of the vote.

=== Third state Senate election, 2002 ===
Obama won both the March 19 Democratic primary election and November 5, 2002, general election for the newly configured 13th district unopposed.

== Early Senate career ==
On January 8, 1997, Obama was sworn in as state senator. Early in his first term, the just-retired U.S. Senator Paul Simon contacted longtime Obama mentor, judge and former congressman Abner Mikva suggesting that Mikva recommend Obama to Emil Jones, Jr., the powerful Democratic leader of the state Senate. "Say, our friend Barack Obama has a chance to push this campaign finance bill through," Simon said in a telephone conversation, as recounted by Mikva in a 2008 interview, "Why don’t you call your friend Emil Jones and tell him how good he is." With Jones' support, Obama helped shepherd through a sweeping law that banned most gifts from lobbyists and personal use of campaign funds by state legislators.

During his first years as a state senator, Obama co-sponsored a bill that restructured the Illinois welfare program into the Temporary Assistance for Needy Families (TANF) program. He also helped get various pieces of legislation that established a $100 million Earned Income Tax Credit for working families, increased child care subsidies for low-income families, and required advance notice before mass layoffs and plant closings passed.

== Campaign for Bobby Rush's congressional seat ==
In September 1999, Obama and fellow Senator Donne Trotter (neither faced re-election that year) both decided to seek the 2000 Democratic nomination for the U.S. House of Representatives seat, held by four term incumbent candidate Bobby Rush.

Rush had been badly defeated in the February 1999 Chicago mayoral election by Richard M. Daley — who won 45% of the African-American vote and even won Rush's own ward — and was thought to be vulnerable. The support of some veteran Democratic fundraisers who saw Obama as a rising star, along with support of African-American entrepreneurs, helped him keep pace with Rush's fundraising in the district's most expensive race ever.

During the campaign, Rush charged that Obama was not sufficiently rooted in Chicago's black neighborhoods to represent constituents' concerns. Rush also benefitted from an outpouring of sympathy when his son was shot to death shortly before the election. Obama said Rush was a part of "a politics that is rooted in the past" and said he himself could build bridges with whites to get things done.

But while Obama did well in his own Hyde Park base, he didn't get enough support from the surrounding black neighborhoods. Starting with just 10 percent name recognition, Obama went on to get only 31 percent of the votes, losing by a more than 2-to-1 margin despite winning among white voters.

== Later Senate career ==
After losing the primary for U.S. Congress to Bobby Rush, Obama worked to repair relations with black politicians and clergy members, telling them he bore no grudges against the victor. He also became more responsive to requests for state funding, getting money for churches and community groups in his district. Senator Trotter, then the top Democrat on the Senate Appropriations Committee, said in 2008 that he knew Obama was responding more to funding requests "because the community groups in his district stopped coming to me".

In November 2000, Obama voted in support of tax public funding for the renovation of Soldier Field (the stadium of the Chicago Bears). While the public funding of the renovation was controversial, the legislation to do so passed the Illinois Senate in a 33–24 vote and soon after passed the Illinois House. During his first campaign for president (in an August 2007 Democratic candidates debate held at Soldier Field), Obama defended this vote (when questioned about it by moderator Keith Olberman); arguing that the renovation was beneficial to economic development in Chicago and had created jobs. In 2015, as president, Obama opposed the future use of tax-exempt funding for professional sports venues.

In September 2001, Democrats won a lottery to redraw legislative districts that had been drawn ten years earlier by Republicans and had helped ensure ten uninterrupted years of Republican control of the Illinois Senate. At the November 2002 election, the Democratic remap helped them win control of the Illinois Senate and expand their majority in the Illinois House to work with the first Democratic Illinois governor in 26 years.

In January 2003, Obama became chairman of the Health and Human Services Committee, after six years on the committee and four years as its minority spokesman. The new Democratic majority allowed Obama to write and help pass more legislation than in previous years. He sponsored successful efforts to expand children's health care, create a plan to provide equal health care access for all Illinois residents, and create a "Hospital Report Card" system, and worker's rights laws that protected whistleblowers, domestic violence victims, equal pay for women, and overtime pay.

His most public accomplishment was a bill requiring police to videotape interrogations and confessions in potential death penalty cases. Obama was willing to listen to Republicans and police organizations and negotiate compromises to get the law passed. That helped him develop a reputation as a pragmatist able to work with various sides of an issue. Obama also led the passage of a law to monitor racial profiling by requiring police to record the race of drivers they stopped.

In February 2002, Obama introduced SB 1789, which would have adopted instant-runoff voting (IRV) for congressional and state primary elections in Illinois, and authorized IRV for local elections, although it did not ultimately pass. He resigned from the Illinois Senate in November 2004, following his election to the U.S. Senate.

Illinois Senate
Preceded by Alice J. Palmer	Illinois Senator from 13th district January 8, 1997 – November 4, 2004	Succeeded by Kwame Raoul
