= Arthur J. Jones =

American white nationalist and Holocaust denier

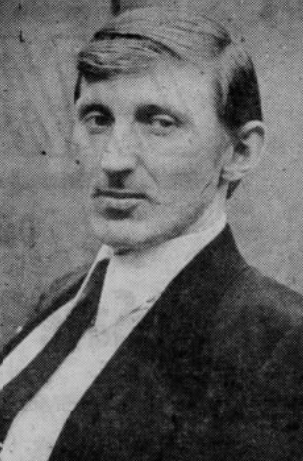
- Jones in 1976

Personal details
- Born: Arthur Joseph Jones; January 1, 1948 (age 78) Beloit, Wisconsin, U.S.
- Party: Republican
- Other political affiliations: American Nazi; Populist
- Education: University of Wisconsin, Whitewater
- Known for: Holocaust denial

Military service
- Allegiance: United States
- Branch/service: United States Army
- Years of service: 1969–1971
- Battles/wars: Vietnam War

Arthur Joseph Jones (born January 1, 1948) is an American neo-Nazi, Holocaust denier and perennial candidate. After running unopposed in the primary election, he was the Republican candidate for Illinois's 3rd congressional district in the 2018 midterm elections, losing to Democrat Dan Lipinski (who was also endorsed by the GOP).

== Early life and career ==
Jones was born in Beloit, Wisconsin, to Lillian Jones, a Sunday School teacher and Arthur Joseph Jones Sr., a factory worker and World War II veteran. He graduated from high school in 1967. He joined the United States Army in 1969 and served in Vietnam for one year during the Vietnam War. He studied at University of Wisconsin–Whitewater from 1974 and majored in political science and journalism.

Jones is an independent insurance broker who worked in commission sales for large insurance companies for 25 years.

== Politics ==
=== Affiliations ===
Jones was a member of the National Socialist White People's Party for eight years and describes himself as a former leader of the American Nazi Party, the NSWPP's former name. He has also been a member of the Populist Party, a far-right political party active in the 1980s and 1990s.

=== Candidacy ===
A perennial candidate, Jones has run for various elected offices since 1976, but has never won an office. In that year, Jones unsuccessfully ran for mayor of Milwaukee, Wisconsin. In 1987, he unsuccessfully ran for alderman of the 13th Ward of Chicago. As of 2018, Jones had run for the U.S. House of Representatives as a Republican eight times; in 1984, 1992, 1996, 1998, 2006, 2008, 2012, and 2018. In 1989 Jones had attempted to run for mayor of Chicago, but was denied inclusion on the Republican primary ballot due to issues regarding his candidature petition.

In 2017, Jones declared his intent to run for the Republican nomination for Congress from Illinois's 3rd congressional district in 2018; he was the only declared candidate of that party. His candidacy was repudiated by the Illinois Republican Party and the Republican National Committee. RNC spokesperson Michael Ahrens stated, "We condemn this candidate and his hateful rhetoric in the strongest possible terms". Jones won the primary unopposed on March 20, 2018, and moved on to face Democratic incumbent Dan Lipinski in the general election. Following his primary victory, Republican party officials encouraged members not to vote for Jones. Despite the GOP disavowing him, 26.2 percent of voters still voted for him in the general election on November 6, 2018, as he lost by more than 47 points. When Republicans ran for the seat in the previous ten years they earned 35.4%, 31.5%, 24.3%, and 21.4% of their respective votes.

Jones ran for Congress in Illinois's 3rd congressional district again in 2020 and was described as a "fake Republican" by the party whose nomination he was attempting to gain. One of the party's digital ads ran with the slogan "Say No To The Nazi". He placed a poor third in the eventual result of the primaries.

=== Views ===
Jones is a white nationalist and Holocaust denier. His 2018 candidate website calls the Holocaust a "racket." He has claimed that the Holocaust was "the biggest, blackest lie in history" and "nothing more than an international extortion racket by the Jews." Jones does not support interracial marriage or integration in public schools. In 1993, Jones was filmed in a fight with Milwaukee Alderman Michael McGee Jr. on The Jerry Springer Show. Jones also “saluted” Nation of Islam leader Louis Farrakhan for his views about Jews, as well as referring to Jews as the enemy.

A neo-Nazi, Jones appears in a photo captioned: "Jones was a guest speaker at the event organized by the Loyal White Knights of the Ku Klux Klan, based in North Carolina"; the image is in a slideshow on his own official candidate website. The same slideshow has another image (captioned "Arthur Jones speaking in Harrisburg Penn., on November 5, 2016") showing him among black-clothed men who hold a National Socialist Movement banner and carry shields marked with the neo-Nazi circle-cross emblem. The same slideshow has an image showing Jones speaking amid Aryan Nations emblems (caption: "Art Jones speaking at the Aryan Nations 2014 World Congress in Converse, La.")

Jones has attended many rallies commemorating Adolf Hitler or supporting white supremacy. Jones considers himself a "white racialist" and has stated "I will work with the [Ku Klux] Klan, with socialists—I exclude communists of course—any patriotic organization that is in general agreement with my beliefs and principles".

In 2016, he was a supporter of Donald Trump for president. Jones said in an interview then, "I agree with a lot of what Mr. Trump has to say [...] He's his own man. I like the fact that doesn't have to go hat in hand to Jewish billionaires to get money". In February 2018, Jones nonetheless said President Trump "surrounded himself with hordes of Jews", and regrets his 2016 vote. At a neo-Nazi meeting in Kentucky, Jones said that Trump "surrounded himself with hordes of Jews including a Jew in his own family, that punk named Jared Kushner", and moved on to say "I'm sorry I voted for the son of a bitch, pardon my English" and that Trump was "nothing but a puppet … this Jew-loving fool", all of which was also captured on video.

According to the Chicago Sun-Times, it takes thousands more signatures to get ballot-approved as an independent candidate than as a Republican; Jones therefore ran in 2016 as a Republican, but the party disavowed him and found technical reasons for removing him from past ballots. Again according to the Sun-Times, Jones took countermeasures in 2017 and 2018 for which the party was unprepared, and so he appeared on their ballot despite official Republican disapproval.

== Electoral history ==
Milwaukee mayoral primary election, 1976 (Note: The candidates who placed first and second in the primary advanced to the general election.)
Party	Candidate	Votes	%
Nonpartisan	Henry W. Maier	54,796	69.5%
Nonpartisan	Jan A. Olson	8,706	11.0%
Nonpartisan	Roman R. Blenski	4,964	6.3%
Nonpartisan	Arthur J. Jones	4,294	5.4%
Nonpartisan	Douglas Tebo	3,183	4.0%
Nonpartisan	Teana Wright	1,686	2.1%
Nonpartisan	Bernard Sentner	1,201	1.5%
Total votes		78,830	100.0%

Illinois's 3rd congressional district Republican primary, 1984
Party	Candidate	Votes	%
Republican	Richard D. Murphy	6,619	48.6%
Republican	Casimir G. Oksas	4,965	36.5%
Republican	Arthur J. Jones	2,025	14.9%
Total votes		13,339	100.0%

Chicago City Council Ward 13 election, 1987
Party	Candidate	Votes	%
Nonpartisan	John Madrzyk	27,209	82.6%
Nonpartisan	James J. O'Connell	4,658	14.2%
Nonpartisan	Arthur J. Jones	1,055	3.2%
Total votes		32,922	100.0%

Illinois's 3rd congressional district Republican primary, 1992
Party	Candidate	Votes	%
Republican	Harry C. Lepinske	8,852	29.3%
Republican	John O'Connor	8,708	28.9%
Republican	Bill O'Connor	7,419	24.6%
Republican	Barbara Purdy	4,389	14.6%
Republican	Arthur J. Jones	795	2.6%
Total votes		30,163	100.0%

Illinois's 3rd congressional district Republican primary, 1996
Party	Candidate	Votes	%
Republican	Jim Nalepa	20,853	74.7%
Republican	Edward J. Schumann	4,167	14.9%
Republican	Arthur J. Jones	2,884	10.3%
Total votes		27,904	100.0%

Illinois's 3rd congressional district Republican primary, 1998
Party	Candidate	Votes	%
Republican	Robert Marshall	9,553	49.3%
Republican	Karl A. Groth	7,424	38.3%
Republican	Arthur J. Jones	2,401	12.4%
Total votes		19,378	100.0%

Illinois's 3rd congressional district Republican primary, 2006
Party	Candidate	Votes	%
Republican	Raymond G. Wardingley	12,603	70.6%
Republican	Arthur J. Jones	5,242	29.4%
Total votes		17,845	100.0%

Illinois's 3rd congressional district Republican primary, 2008
Party	Candidate	Votes	%
Republican	Michael Hawkins	13,722	66.9%
Republican	Arthur J. Jones	6,804	33.1%
Total votes		20,526	100.0%

Illinois's 3rd congressional district Republican primary, 2012
Party	Candidate	Votes	%
Republican	Richard L. Grabowski	20,895	59.4%
Republican	Jim Falvey	10,449	29.7%
Republican	Arthur J. Jones	3,861	11.0%
Total votes		35,205	100.0%

Illinois's 3rd congressional district general election, 2018
Party	Candidate	Votes	%
Democratic	Dan Lipinski (incumbent)	163,053	73.0%
Republican	Arthur J. Jones	57,885	25.9%
Write-in votes	Justin Hanson	1,353	0.6%
Write-in votes	Kenneth Yerkes	1,039	0.5%
Write-in votes	Richard Mayers	4	0.0%
Total votes		223,334	100.0%

Illinois's 3rd congressional district Republican primary, 2020
Party	Candidate	Votes	%
Republican	Mike Fricilone	9,804	57.5%
Republican	Catherine O'Shea	5,541	32.5%
Republican	Arthur Jones	1,708	10.0%
Total votes		17.053	100.0%
