= 2000 Illinois's 1st congressional district election =

- November 7, 2000
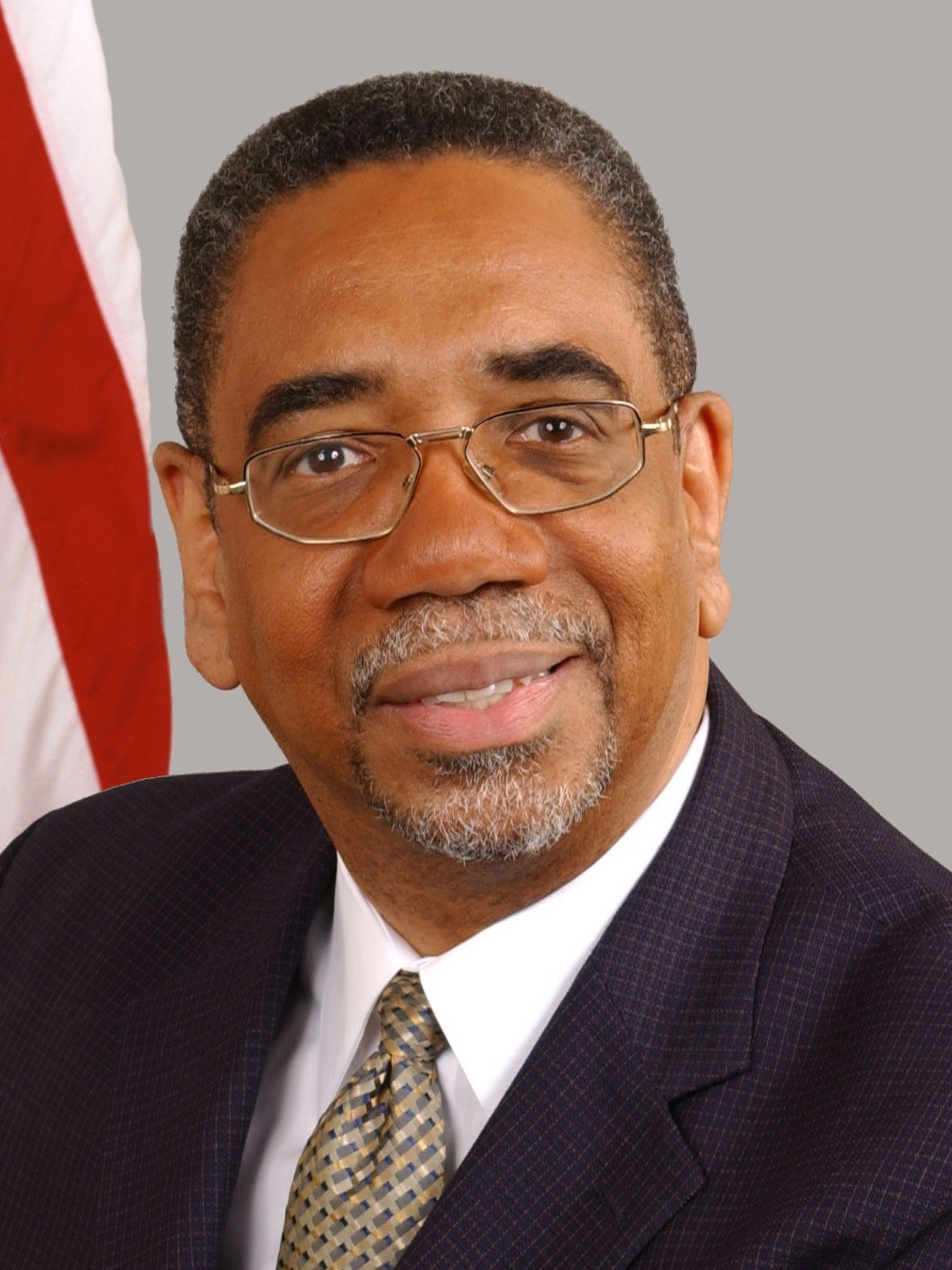

Nominee	Bobby Rush	Raymond Wardingley
Party	Democratic	Republican
Popular vote	172,271	23,915
Percentage	87.8%	12.2%
U.S. Representative before election
Bobby Rush
Democratic
Elected U.S. Representative
Bobby Rush
Democratic

The 2000 United States House of Representatives election for the 1st district in Illinois took place on November 7, 2000, to elect a representative from Illinois's 1st congressional district for the 107th United States Congress. Incumbent Democratic representative Bobby Rush faced a primary challenge from Illinois Senator and future President Barack Obama. Rush defeated Obama 61 percent to 30 percent, with other candidates combining for the remaining nine percent. Rush later defeated his Republican opponent, Raymond Wardingley, 88 percent to 12 percent, ensuring his reelection. Subsequent to this election, Obama was elected to the Senate in 2004, and later elected President in 2008.

== District ==
Illinois's 1st congressional district is a minority-majority district. At the time of the election, 65 percent of its constituents were African American. In redistricting after the 1990 United States census, the district was extended into the suburbs for the first time in 90 years, but a majority of the districts' residents (70%) lived in Chicago. A strongly Democratic district, only twice since 1966 has a Republican candidate for United States Congress received over 20% of the vote.

== Background ==
Rush was involved in the civil rights movement of the 1960s. He was a member of the Student Nonviolent Coordinating Committee (SNCC) and a former member and founder of the Illinois chapter of the Black Panther Party. After coordinating a medical clinic that treated sickle cell anemia, Rush served as an alderman and was first elected to represent Illinois's 1st district in 1992. Rush ran for Mayor of Chicago against Richard M. Daley in 1999 and lost, receiving only 28% of the vote, making him appear electorally vulnerable.

Obama, at age 38, was a lecturer at the University of Chicago and a two-term state Senator. Though friends, including Terry Link, his colleague in the Illinois Senate, warned Obama against challenging Rush, as there was no obvious reason to displace him to the voters, Obama ran anyway because of his frustration with what he claimed was Republican obstructionism in the Illinois Legislature and the feeling Rush was representing the district less effectively than Obama could. Also challenging Rush were Donne Trotter, a state senator, and George Roby, a police officer. Raymond Wardingley, a perennial candidate who worked as a clown, ran unopposed for the Republican nomination.

== Obama's campaign ==
2000 Illinois's 1st congressional district Democratic primary
- March 21, 2000
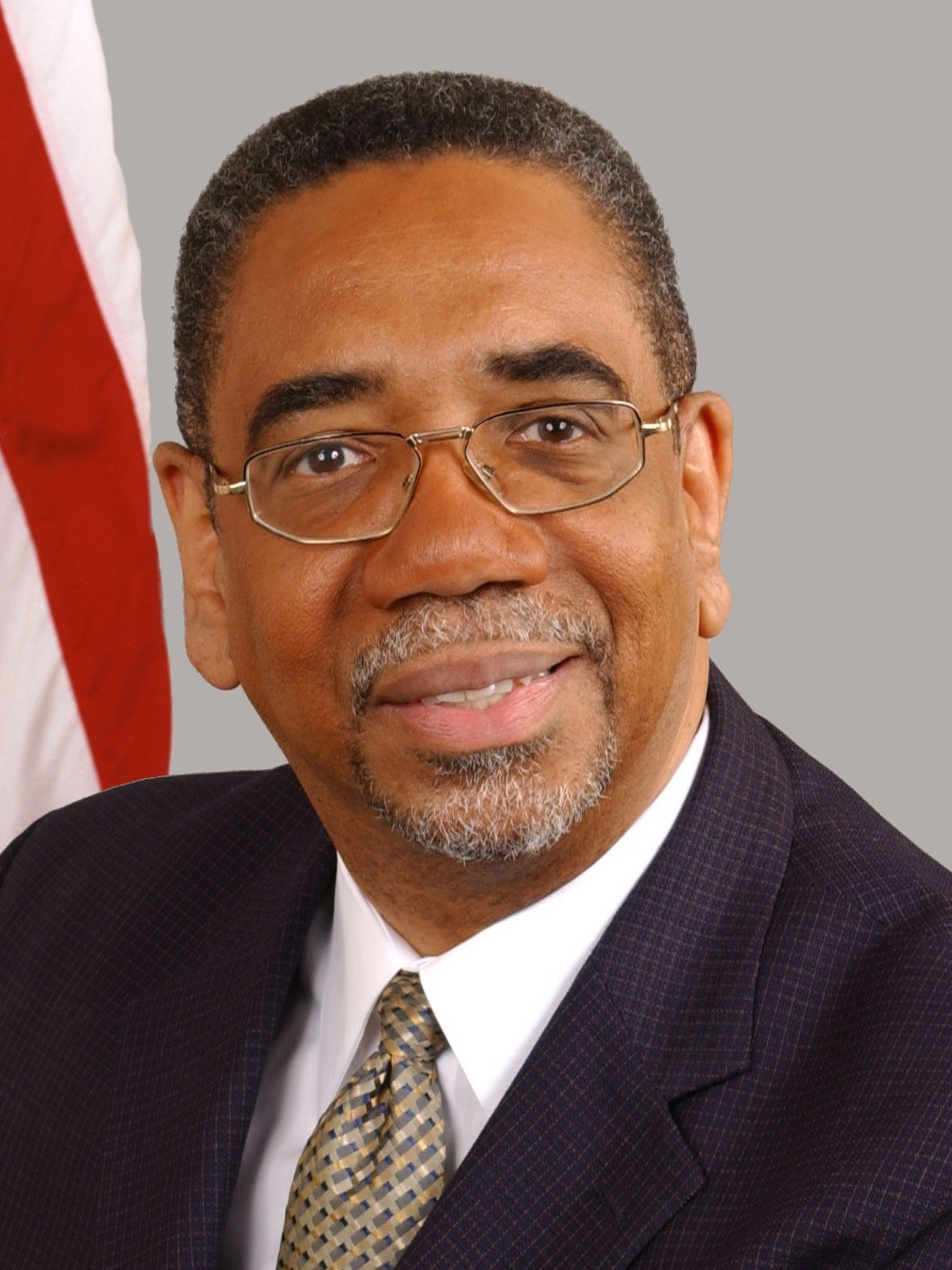

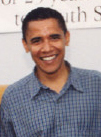

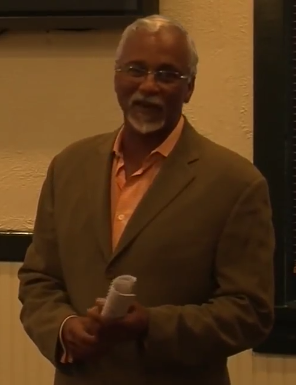
Nominee	Bobby Rush	Barack Obama	Donne Trotter
Party	Democratic	Democratic	Democratic
Popular vote	59,599	29,649	6,915
Percentage	61.03%	30.36%	7.08%
Nominee before election
Bobby Rush
Democratic
Elected Nominee
Bobby Rush
Democratic

Obama entered the race in late September 1999, six months before the primary, stating that Rush represented "a politics that is rooted in the past, a reactive politics that isn’t good at coming up with concrete solutions." He promised to build consensus and lead coalitions involving people outside of the black community to reduce crime, improve health care coverage, promote economic development and expand educational opportunities.

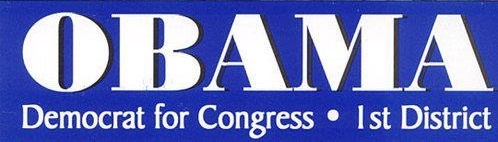
Logo of Obama's campaign

Early polling showed Rush's name recognition started off at 90 percent, with Obama's at 11 percent. Rush had 70 percent approval, while Obama had 8 percent approval. In the head-to-head matchup, forty-seven percent of the people polled favored Rush, 10 percent favored Obama, and 5 percent supported Trotter, who is also African American. Most of Obama's support came from White Americans.

In mid-October, Rush's son, Huey, was murdered, leading Obama to put his campaign on hold. Governor George Ryan called the Illinois Legislature to a special session to re-enact a package of gun control bills, a pet issue of Rush, which had been overturned by the Illinois Supreme Court. Obama supported the package, but the session dragged on towards Christmas. Obama annually spent the Christmas vacation in Hawaii with his family visiting his grandmother, who raised him. Obama left Illinois, expecting the session would continue into January. However, a crucial vote took place earlier than expected, failing by five votes with Obama and others absent. Obama came under fire for missing the vote though he said he would have flown back sooner, but his 18-month-old daughter was sick. Meanwhile, Rush received an outpouring of sympathy that aided his campaign.

As Obama lived in Hyde Park, a more affluent neighborhood with a higher percentage of White voters than the rest of the district, the narrative of the race became "the Black Panther against the professor." Obama frequently came off as uptight. Rush criticized Obama: "Barack Obama went to Harvard and became an educated fool. We’re not impressed with these folks with these Eastern elite degrees. Barack is a person who read about the civil-rights protests and thinks he knows all about it." Trotter said, "Barack is viewed in part to be the white man in blackface in our community." Though the Chicago Tribune endorsed Obama, many, including local officials, President Bill Clinton, and Vice President Al Gore, the Democratic Party nominee for President, endorsed Rush. Then–State Representative Tom Dart supported Obama and organized on his behalf in the 19th ward.

Obama raised enough money to remain competitive with Rush. However, he neither connected with the working-class African Americans of the district nor provided a convincing reason for them to vote against Rush. Obama later wrote: "Less than halfway into the campaign, I knew in my bones that I was going to lose. Each morning from that point forward I awoke with a vague sense of dread, realizing that I would have to spend the day smiling and shaking hands and pretending that everything was going according to plan."

== Democratic primary ==
=== Candidates ===
==== Nominee ====
- Bobby Rush, incumbent U.S. representative (1993–2023)

==== Eliminated in primary ====
- Barack Obama, state senator from SD-13 (1997–2004)
- George Roby, retired police officer
- Donne Trotter, state senator from SD-16 (1993–2003)

=== Endorsements ===
Bobby Rush

Executive officials

- Bill Clinton, president of the United States (1993–2001)
- Al Gore, vice president of the United States (1993–2001)

U.S. senators

- Dick Durbin, Illinois (1997–present)

U.S. representatives

- Danny Davis, IL-07 (1997–present)
- Jesse Jackson Jr., IL-02 (1995–2012)
- Charles Rangel, NY-15 (1971–2017)

Local officials

- John Stroger, president of the Cook County Board of Commissioners (1994–2006)

Individuals

- Jesse Jackson, civil rights activist and candidate for president in 1984 and 1988
Barack Obama

Executive branch officials

- Abner Mikva, former White House counsel (1994–1995)

State legislators

- Tom Dart, HD-28 (1993–2003)

Local officials

- Toni Preckwinkle, Chicago's 4th ward (1991–2010)

Individuals

- Michael Pfleger, priest and activist

Newspapers

- Chicago Tribune
Declined to endorse

Local officials

- Richard M. Daley, mayor of Chicago (1989–2011)

Individuals

- David Axelrod, political consultant

=== Results ===
Democratic primary results
Party	Candidate	Votes	%
Democratic	Bobby Rush (incumbent)	59,599	61.03%
Democratic	Barack Obama	29,649	30.36%
Democratic	Donne Trotter	6,915	7.08%
Democratic	George Roby	1,501	1.54%
Total votes		97,664	100.00%

== Republican primary ==
=== Candidates ===
==== Nominee ====
- Raymond Wardingley, perennial candidate

==== Results ====
Wardingley ran for the Republican nomination without opposition.

Republican primary results
Party	Candidate	Votes	%
Republican	Raymond Wardingley	2,721	100.00%
Total votes		2,721	100.00%

== General election ==
=== Results ===
2000 Illinois's 1st congressional district election results
Party	Candidate	Votes	%
Democratic	Bobby Rush (incumbent)	172,271	87.81%
Republican	Raymond Wardingley	23,915	12.19%
Total votes		196,186	100.00%
Democratic hold			

== Aftermath ==
Obama later said about his loss to Rush "I got my rear end handed to me" and acknowledged his own hubris. However, many analysts believe that Obama's loss helped him to learn from his mistakes, which enabled him to run more successful campaigns in 2004 and 2008. Obama was seen as a stiff policy wonk, and he used the experience to hone his ability to connect with voters. According to Chicago City Council member Toni Preckwinkle, an early Obama supporter, Obama "took a hard look at himself after that campaign and became a much better campaigner, more at ease on the campaign trail." He put more effort into his campaign, hiring David Axelrod as his chief political strategist. Also, Obama increased his focus on the Illinois Senate, improving his legislative accomplishments.

In 2004, Obama was the keynote speaker at the Democratic National Convention. After his speech, political pundits speculated about his future as a possible presidential candidate. After being elected to the United States Senate that year, and amid much speculation in the media regarding his future plans, Obama announced that he would seek the 2008 Democratic presidential nomination in February 2007 and went on to defeat fellow senator Hillary Clinton in one of the closest presidential nomination races in American history. He then defeated John McCain, also a senator, in the general election to become President of the United States. He was re-elected in 2012.

Bobby Rush served a total of thirty years in the House of Representatives, retiring in early 2023 after 15 terms.

== See also ==
- Electoral history of Barack Obama
- Illinois Senate career of Barack Obama

== Bibliography ==
- Remnick, David (2010). The Bridge: The Life and Rise of Barack Obama. Random House Digital, Inc. pp. 656. ISBN 978-1-4000-4360-6.
