= No Taxpayer Funding for Abortion Act =

The No Taxpayer Funding for Abortion Act (H.R. 3) is a bill that was introduced to the 112th Congress of the United States in the House of Representatives by Rep. Chris Smith (R-New Jersey) and Dan Lipinski (D-Illinois). The bill's stated purpose is "[t]o prohibit taxpayer funded abortions and to provide for conscience protections, and for other purposes." In large measure, it would render permanent the restrictions on federal funding of abortion in the United States laid out in the Hyde Amendment. The bill passed the House of Representatives on May 4, 2011 by a vote of 251-175. The House of Representatives passed similar legislation in 2014, 2015, and 2017.

== Controversy over language about rape ==
The text of the most recent version of the Hyde Amendment provides an exception for cases of rape, stating that its prohibitions shall not apply "if the pregnancy is the result of an act of rape or incest." The rape exception in H.R. 3 uses somewhat different language, stating that its limitations shall not apply "if the pregnancy occurred because the pregnant female was the subject of an act of forcible rape or, if a minor, an act of incest." Some women's rights groups have questioned the addition of the qualifier "forcible" to the word "rape" in H.R. 3, noting that it excludes many forms of rape and "takes us back to a time where just saying no was not enough." However, the final version of the bill ultimately did not include the term "forcible rape."

One critic, Mother Jones magazine, alleged that the bill is a deliberate attempt on the part of the Republican Party to change the legal definition of rape.

Another critic, Representative Debbie Wasserman Schultz (D-FL) criticized the legislation, too. An article in The Raw Story had this to say about her reaction to HR 3. "The Florida Democrat, a rising star in her party and vice chair of the Democratic National Committee, is a leading voice on women's issues. And she didn't mince her words in an interview with The Raw Story, fiercely denouncing GOP colleagues over H.R. 3, the "No Taxpayer Funding for Abortion Act." 'It is absolutely outrageous,' Wasserman Schultz said in an exclusive interview late Monday afternoon. "I consider the proposal of this bill a violent act against women..." She continued, "It really is -- to suggest that there is some kind of rape that would be okay to force a woman to carry the resulting pregnancy to term, and abandon the principle that has been long held, an exception that has been settled for 30 years, is to me a violent act against women in and of itself," Wasserman Schultz said. "Rape is when a woman is forced to have sex against her will, and that is whether she is conscious, unconscious, mentally stable, not mentally stable," the four-term congresswoman added.

Critics insist that HR 3 would directly diminish the rights of women who have fallen victim to rapes that are not considered "forcible" by the bill, as well as increase the danger of these types of sexual abuse occurring.

TalkingPointsMemo reported, "In an interview with the anti-abortion site LifeNews, Douglas Johnson, the legislative director for the National Right to Life Committee, admits the language in the House's No Taxpayer Funding for Abortion Act "would not allow general federal funding of abortion on all under-age pregnant girls."

However, the bill's text does not offer a definition of "rape" nor of "forcible rape." Responding to the criticism about the language used in the rape exception clause, bill co-sponsor Dan Lipinski (D) stated, "The language of H.R. 3 was not intended to change existing law regarding taxpayer funding for abortion in cases of rape, nor is it expected that it would do so. Nonetheless, the legislative process will provide an opportunity to clarify this should such a need exist."

== Political impact ==
David Weigel has pointed to this bill, as well as to the proposed Protect Life Act and efforts to defund Planned Parenthood, as a move that will backfire on the Republican Party. He writes that Democrats such as Rep. Steve Israel (D-NY), chair of the Democratic Congressional Campaign Committee, already are and will continue to be pointing out that the party made its top priority redefining rape, and otherwise focusing on social issues, rather than creating jobs.
