= Charles Hayes (politician) =

American politician (1918–1997)

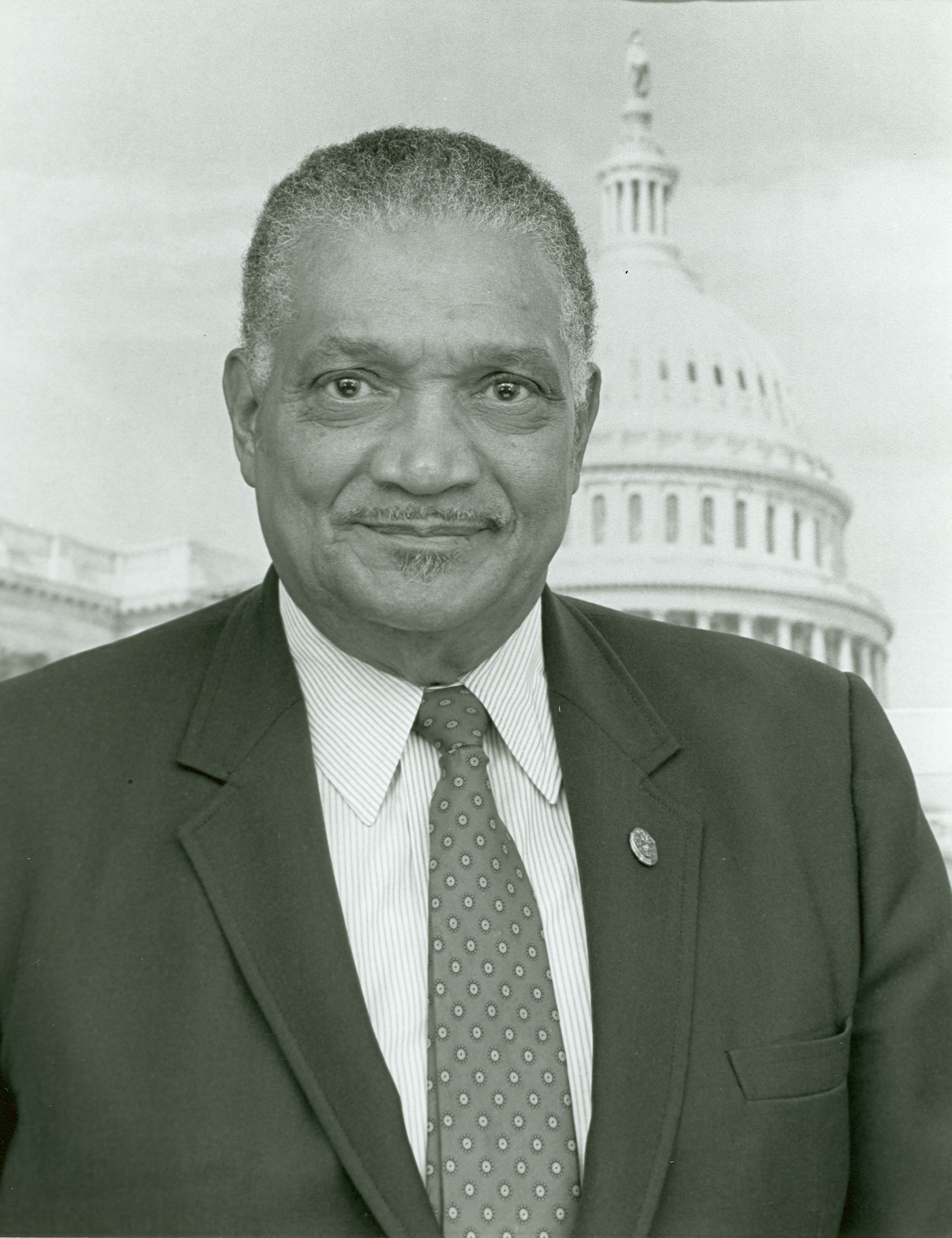

Member of the U.S. House of Representatives from Illinois's 1st district
- In office August 23, 1983 – January 3, 1993
- Preceded by: Harold Washington
- Succeeded by: Bobby Rush

Personal details
- Born: Charles Arthur Hayes; February 17, 1918 Cairo, Illinois, U.S.
- Died: April 8, 1997 (aged 79) Chicago, Illinois, U.S.
- Party: Democratic

Charles Arthur Hayes (February 17, 1918 – April 8, 1997) was an American politician who served as a member of the United States House of Representatives, representing Illinois's 1st congressional district, from 1983 to 1993.

== Early life ==
Hayes was born in Cairo, Illinois, and graduated from Cairo's Sumner High School in 1935. He was a trade unionist from 1938 to 1983 and served as vice president of the United Food and Commercial Workers Union.

== Career ==
Hayes was a resident of Chicago for most of his adult life. Hayes was also a prolific union man for 45 years. In the 1950s, he raised funds for Martin Luther King Jr.'s voter registration drive in the South. He was a civil rights leader who worked closely with King in the Southern Christian Leadership Conference during the 1960s. Later, he was one of major labor leaders arrested during the 1980s anti-apartheid protests that eventually won the freedom of Nelson Mandela. Congressman Hayes was the CBTU's first executive vice president, serving until 1986.

Hayes was elected as a Democrat to the 98th United States Congress by a special election held on August 23, 1983, to fill the vacancy caused by the resignation of Harold Washington, who had been elected mayor of Chicago. While a representative, Hayes was on the Committee on Education and Labor and Small Business Committee. He was most noted for pieces of legislation to encourage school dropouts to re-enter and complete their education.

His candidacy for renomination in 1992 to the 103rd United States Congress was unsuccessful, as he was defeated in the Democratic primary by Bobby Rush, partly due to the House banking scandal.

Hayes was also one of the founding members of Rainbow/PUSH, along with Jesse Jackson.

== Death ==
Hayes died from complications of lung cancer at the age of 79. Then-Congressman Jesse Jackson Jr. spoke at Hayes' funeral.

== Electoral history ==
Illinois's 1st congressional district Democratic primary, 1992
Party	Candidate	Votes	%
Democratic	Bobby L. Rush	54,231	42.20
Democratic	Charles A. Hayes (incumbent)	50,191	39.06
Democratic	Anna R. Langford	14,094	10.96
Democratic	Roosevelt Thomas	4,256	3.31
Democratic	Allen Smith	3,486	2.71
Democratic	Smith Wiiams	2,219	1.72
Write-in		13	0.01
Total votes		128,490	100.0

Illinois's 1st congressional district general election, 1990
Party	Candidate	Votes	%	±%
Democratic	Charles A. Hayes (incumbent)	100,890	93.77	−2.28%
Republican	Babette Peyton	6,708	6.23	+2.28%
Total votes		107,598	100.0	

Illinois's 1st congressional district Democratic primary, 1990
Party	Candidate	Votes	%
Democratic	Charles A. Hayes (incumbent)	83,098	92.56
Democratic	Gilbert S. Marchman	6,676	7.44
Total votes		89,774	100.0

Illinois's 1st congressional district general election, 1988
Party	Candidate	Votes	%	±%
Democratic	Charles A. Hayes (incumbent)	164,125	96.05	−0.35%
Republican	Stephen J. Evans	6,753	3.95	+0.35%
Total votes		170,878	100.0	

Illinois's 1st congressional district Democratic primary, 1988
Party	Candidate	Votes	%
Democratic	Charles A. Hayes (incumbent)	97,168	87.46
Democratic	Inez M. Gardner	13,930	12.54
Total votes		111,098	100.0

Illinois's 1st congressional district general election, 1986
Party	Candidate	Votes	%	±%
Democratic	Charles A. Hayes (incumbent)	122,376	96.40	+0.76%
Republican	Joseph C. Faulkner	4,572	3.60	N/A
Total votes		126,948	100.0	

Illinois's 1st congressional district Democratic primary, 1986
Party	Candidate	Votes	%
Democratic	Charles A. Hayes (incumbent)	79,356	92.59
Democratic	Melverlene Clark	6,363	7.41
Total votes		85,899	100.0

Illinois's 1st congressional district general election, 1984
Party	Candidate	Votes	%
Democratic	Charles A. Hayes (incumbent)	177,438	95.64
Socialist Workers	Eddie L. Warren	8,086	4.36
Write-in		10	0.01
Total votes		185,534	100.0

Illinois's 1st congressional district Democratic primary, 1984
Party	Candidate	Votes	%
Democratic	Charles A. Hayes (incumbent)	93,123	83.29
Democratic	Sheila Jones	18,685	16.71
Write-in		3	0.00
Total votes		111,811	100.0

== See also ==
- List of African-American United States representatives

U.S. House of Representatives
Preceded by Harold Washington	Member of the U.S. House of Representatives from Illinois's 1st congressional district 1983-1993	Succeeded by Bobby Rush
