= Dan Lipinski =

American politician (born 1966)

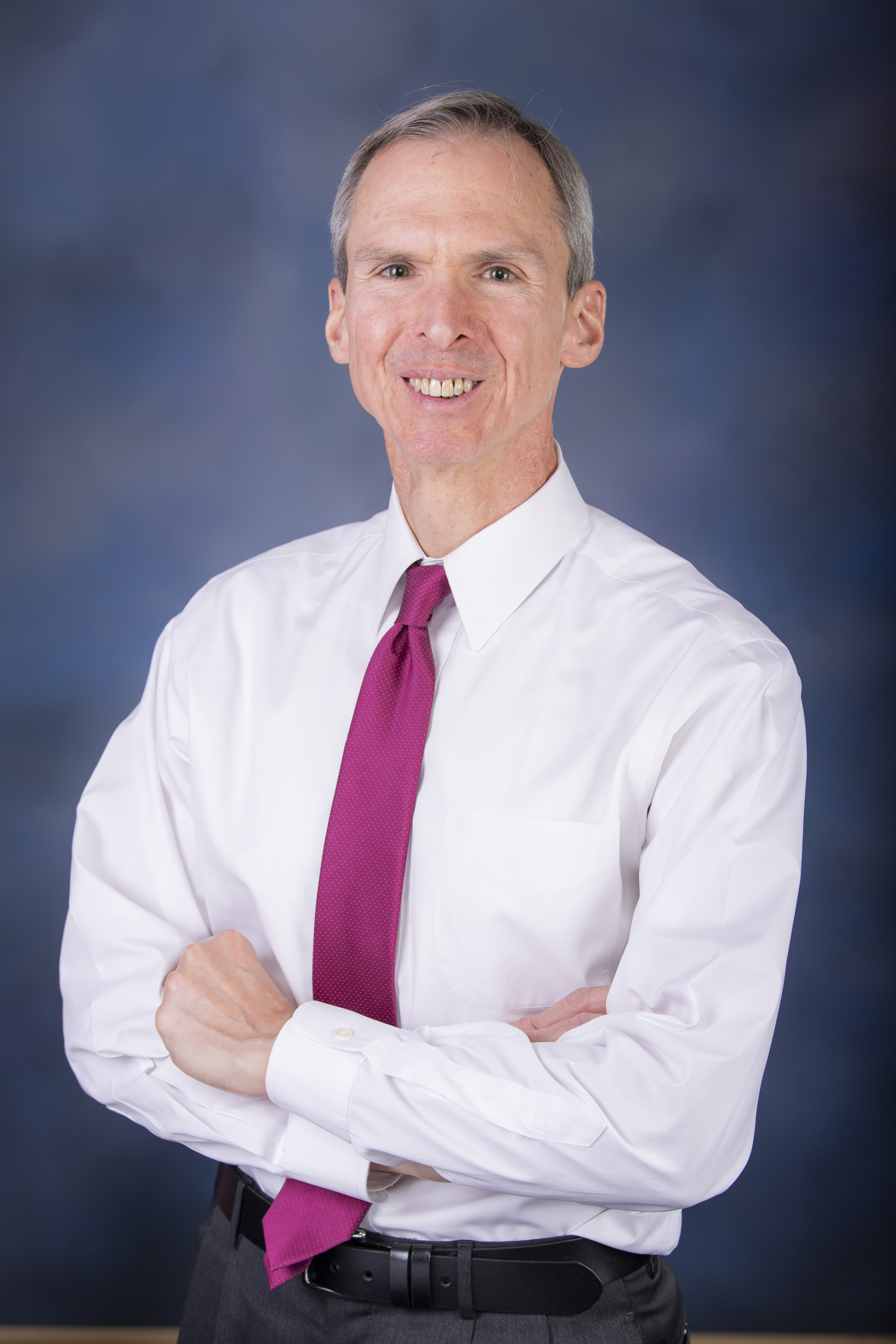
- Official portrait, 2018

Member of the U.S. House of Representatives from Illinois's 3rd district
- In office January 3, 2005 – January 3, 2021
- Preceded by: Bill Lipinski
- Succeeded by: Marie Newman

Personal details
- Born: Daniel William Lipinski; July 15, 1966 (age 60) Chicago, Illinois, U.S.
- Party: Democratic
- Spouse: Judy Lipinski
- Relatives: Bill Lipinski (father)
- Education: Northwestern University (BS); Stanford University (MS); Duke University (PhD)
- Lipinski's voice Lipinski on climate change. Recorded November 1, 2017

Daniel William Lipinski (born July 15, 1966) is an American politician and political scientist who served eight terms as the U.S. representative for Illinois's 3rd congressional district from 2005 to 2021.

A member of the Blue Dog Coalition, Lipinski was one of the most socially conservative Democrats in Congress. Lipinski did not endorse President Barack Obama in the 2012 United States presidential election, opposed legalized abortion and embryonic stem cell research and was one of 39 House Democrats to vote against the Affordable Care Act. Lipinski represented a district whose Democratic Party electorate became increasingly liberal during his time in Congress, leading to his defeat in the Democratic primary for the 2020 election by Marie Newman.

== Early life, education, and career ==
Lipinski was born in Chicago, the son of Rose Marie (née Lapinski) and future U.S. Congressman Bill Lipinski. He attended St. Ignatius College Prep, graduating in 1984. He received a B.S. in mechanical engineering from the Robert R. McCormick School of Engineering and Applied Science at Northwestern University in 1988, an M.S. in engineering-economic systems from Stanford University in 1989 and a Ph.D. in political science from Duke University in 1998.

In the summer of 1992, Lipinski interned at the United States Department of Labor. He interned for U.S. Congressman George E. Sangmeister from 1993 to 1995. From 1995 to 1996 Lipinski was a legislative staff member for U.S. Congressman Jerry Costello. He then served on Cook County State's Attorney Richard A. Devine's campaign during the 1996 election season, and later on Devine's transition staff. After a short stint on then-U.S. Congressman Rod Blagojevich's staff, Lipinski served as a communications staff aide to then-House Minority Leader Dick Gephardt.

From 2000 to 2001, Lipinski taught at the University of Notre Dame. In 2001, he joined the faculty of the University of Tennessee, where he remained until his election to Congress in 2004.

== U.S. House of Representatives ==
In 2004, Lipinski's father ran for re-nomination in the Democratic primary. After easily winning the nomination, the elder Lipinski announced his retirement. As the Democratic committeeman for Chicago's 23rd Ward—which is virtually coextensive with the Chicago portion of the 3rd district—he was able to persuade the state Democratic Party to select his son to replace him on the ballot. The move was somewhat controversial; since the younger Lipinski had not lived regularly in Illinois since 1989 or run for elected office before, but it allowed him to sidestep the Democratic primary—the real contest in this heavily Democratic district. He then bought a home in Western Springs as his residence in the district. As expected, Lipinski defeated his Republican challenger, Ryan Chlada, in the general election. He went on to win re-election seven times.

In the 2006 Democratic primary Lipinski won 55% of the vote against two opponents, and in the general election he defeated the Republican nominee, Raymond Wardingley, with 77% of the vote. Lipinski defeated three opponents in the 2008 Democratic primary and beat Republican Michael Hawkins in the general election with 73% of the vote. In the 2010 general election Lipinski defeated Republican Michael Bendas with over 70% of the vote.

Lipinski faced Marie Newman in the 2018 Democratic primary and defeated her with 51.2% of the vote to Newman's 48.8%. She challenged him again in 2020, as did Muslim-American activist and businessman Rush Darwish and local resident Charles Hughes. Another primary challenger, Abe Matthew, dropped out and endorsed Newman. Newman won the primary. Newman outspent Lipinski with $2,732,742.44 to Lipinski's $2,170,908.37, additional "outside spending" by Super PACs in the 2020 Democratic primary favored Newman with $1,557,969 against $371,941 in Lipinski's favor.

=== Committee assignments ===
Lipinski served on two House Committees: Transportation & Infrastructure and Science, Space, & Technology. He was the most senior member from Illinois on the Transportation & Infrastructure Committee, serving on the Subcommittee on Aviation and the Subcommittee on Railroads, Pipelines, and Hazardous Materials, which he chaired. On the Committee on Science, Space, and Technology, Lipinski was previously the Ranking Member of the Subcommittee on Research and sat on the Subcommittee on Energy. The district includes Argonne National Laboratory.

- Committee on Science, Space & Technology
  - Subcommittee on Research & Technology
  - Subcommittee on Energy
- Committee on Transportation & Infrastructure
  - Subcommittee on Aviation
  - Subcommittee on Railroads, Pipelines, & Hazardous Materials (Chairman)
  - Subcommittee on Highways and Transit

=== Caucus memberships ===
- Blue Dog Coalition
- Congressional Arts Caucus
- Afterschool Caucuses
- Congressional Buy American Caucus (Founder and co-chair)
- Bi-partisan Congressional Pro-life Caucus (Co-chair)
- Blue Collar Caucus
- United States Congressional International Conservation Caucus
- Veterinary Medicine Caucus
- Climate Solutions Caucus
- Problem Solvers Caucus

== Political positions ==
Lipinski was one of the most socially conservative Democrats in Congress. In recent years his district has been described as largely liberal, but it has long been the most conservative of the eight districts in and around Chicago, with a Cook Partisan Voting Index of D+6; no other Chicago-based district has a PVI lower than D+15. The district earned a reputation as being home to Reagan Democrats when in the 1980 presidential election it was one of only two Chicago districts (out of nine) to be won by Republican Ronald Reagan.

Lipinski has repeatedly argued that the Democratic Party is moving too far to the left, which he believes helped Donald Trump become president. As one sign of his distance from the party, during the lame duck period after both he and President Trump had been defeated, he was one of only two Democrats to vote against HR 9051 on December 28, 2020, thus voting against increasing coronavirus economic relief checks, which had been delayed for over six months, from $600 to $2000, even while 44 Republicans voted with the Democrats.

A socially conservative Democrat, Lipinski has a lifetime score of 90% from the League of Conservation Voters, an F grade from the National Rifle Association, and a 91% lifetime rating from the AFL-CIO. He did not endorse President Barack Obama for reelection in 2012, opposes legalized abortion and stem cell research, was the only House Democrat from Illinois to vote against the Affordable Care Act, supported reauthorizing the Patriot Act in 2006, and supported the Defense of Marriage and First Amendment Defense Acts. In January 2020, Lipinski, fellow Democratic Representative Collin Peterson, 166 Republican representatives and 39 Republican senators submitted an amicus curiae brief calling on the Supreme Court to reconsider and potentially overturn Roe v. Wade and Planned Parenthood v. Casey, two cases that upheld abortion rights. Despite his social conservatism, Lipinski voted with the Democratic Party 87% of the time while in Congress. In the 2020 election, Lipinski was defeated in the Democratic primary by progressive challenger Marie Newman, who had unsuccessfully challenged him in the 2018 primary election.

=== American jobs and manufacturing ===
Lipinski authored H.R. 2447, the American Manufacturing Competitiveness Act of 2013, to require the federal government to produce a national strategic plan to boost advanced manufacturing in the United States every four years, much like the Quadrennial Defense Review. During a hearing of the Research and Technology Subcommittee of the House Committee on Science, Space, and Technology, witness Zach Mottl said this bill would create the first American strategy for manufacturing since Alexander Hamilton's "Report on Manufactures" in 1791. The bill became law as part of the Consolidated and Further Continuing Appropriations Act, FY2015. The first National Strategic Plan for Advanced Manufacturing was published in October 2018. The Office of Science and Technology Policy is currently working the next plan which the Biden administration is required to release in 2022.

=== LGBT rights ===
Lipinski opposed recognition of same-sex marriage until the Supreme Court legalized it nationwide in Obergefell v. Hodges. In 2011, he supported the Defense of Marriage Act (DOMA), which denied federal benefits to gay couples. The portion of DOMA that prohibited gay marriage was ruled unconstitutional by the Supreme Court in 2013; by 2015, Lipinski had not publicly changed his support for DOMA. Lipinski supported the First Amendment Defense Act, which would prohibit the federal government from requiring that some businesses not discriminate against same-sex couples. In 2009 Lipinski voted for the Hate Crimes Expansion bill, which expands the definition of hate crime and strengthens enforcement of hate-crime laws. Lipinski also voted for the Equality Act in 2019. In 2010 he voted in favor of repealing Don't ask, don't tell.

Lipinski now says he personally opposes same-sex marriage but supports the status quo "because it has been declared the law of the land." In 2016, he supported the Republican version of the Religious Freedom Restoration Act, which sought to allow businesses to deny services to individuals if they felt providing service would violate their religious beliefs.

=== Foreign policy and national security ===
After the 2014 Hong Kong class boycott campaign and Umbrella Movement broke out, Lipinski joined Senator Sherrod Brown's and Representative Chris Smith's effort to introduce the Hong Kong Human Rights and Democracy Act, which would update the United States–Hong Kong Policy Act of 1992. He expressed support for Hong Kong's autonomy and the pro-democracy protests, saying, "conducting free and fair elections by universal suffrage is a guarantee that China itself made to Hong Kong. Any effort to end these demonstrations with aggressive force or disrupt the unique government structure that exists between China and Hong Kong will have a serious impact on China's relationship with the many nations of this world that stand for democracy and freedom."

Lipinski supports strong counter-terrorism and domestic surveillance laws. He voted for the Patriot Act re-authorization of 2006, the Protect America Act of 2007, the FISA Amendment Act of 2008, the Patriot Act Extension of 2011, and the FISA Extension of 2012. He voted against the Amash Amendment to the 2013 National Defense Authorization Act. Lipinski is one of only two Democratic lawmakers to have supported counter-terrorism and domestic surveillance laws to that extent.

=== Economy ===
Lipinski introduced the American Manufacturing Competitiveness Act on June 12, 2012. The bill would require the government to implement policies that support manufacturing products that qualify for the "Made in U.S.A." label, such as the establishment of a Manufacturing Strategy Board within the United States Department of Commerce that includes federal officials, two state governors from different parties, and nine private-sector leaders and stakeholders from the manufacturing industry. The U.S. House of Representatives passed the bill on September 12, 2012, by a 339–77 vote.

Lipinski has proposed what he calls a "Five-Point Jobs Plan". According to Lipinski, the plan would "strengthen manufacturing, modernize our infrastructure, educate the workforce, force other countries to trade fairly and invest in innovation."

=== Healthcare ===
Lipinski was the only Illinois Democrat in Congress to oppose the Patient Protection and Affordable Care Act (Obamacare), which passed the House on March 21, 2010. He said that he broke ranks with his party for a number of reasons, including the bill's provisions related to abortion. Lipinski had previously voted for a version of the bill that contained more stringent restrictions on abortion funding. In 2017 he said he was trying to prevent Republicans from repealing Obamacare.

In October 2013 Lipinski was the primary sponsor of HR3425, which would have delayed any penalties under the PPACA until four months after the program's website was fully functional.

=== Abortion and stem cell research ===
Lipinski is anti-abortion and served as co-chair of the bipartisan Congressional Pro-Life Caucus. He was a co-sponsor of the No Taxpayer Funding for Abortion Act. In June 2013, Lipinski was one of only six Democrats in Congress who voted for a nationwide 20-week abortion ban.

In 2007, Lipinski voted against legislation to increase funding for embryonic stem cell research.

=== Immigration ===
In 2018, while facing a strong primary challenge, Lipinski expressed support for creating a pathway to citizenship for DREAMers (undocumented immigrants who were brought into the United States as minors). Previously he voted against the DREAM Act, which would have created a pathway to citizenship for those individuals. In 2020, he co-sponsored and voted for the American Dream and Promise Act.

=== Marijuana ===
Lipinski was one of six House Democrats to vote against the Marijuana Opportunity Reinvestment and Expungement (MORE) Act to legalize cannabis at the federal level in 2020.

=== Presidential endorsements ===
Lipinski voted for Ronald Reagan in 1984, the first presidential election in which he could vote.

At the 2008 Democratic National Convention, Lipinski was a superdelegate for Barack Obama. He did not endorse Obama for reelection in the 2012 election.

In the 2020 United States presidential election, Lipinski voted for the ticket of the American Solidarity Party, and appeared at an organizing event for the party in 2024.

== Electoral history ==
Illinois 3rd congressional district general election, 2004
Party	Candidate	Votes	%
Democratic	Dan Lipinski	167,034	72.64
Republican	Ryan Chlada	57,845	25.15
Write-in votes	Krista Grimm	5,077	2.21
Total votes		229,956	100.0

Illinois 3rd congressional district Democratic primary, 2006
Party	Candidate	Votes	%
Democratic	Dan Lipinski (incumbent)	44,401	54.45
Democratic	John T. Kelly	20,918	25.65
Democratic	John P. Sullivan	16,231	19.90
Total votes		81,550	100.0

Illinois 3rd congressional district general election, 2006
Party	Candidate	Votes	%
Democratic	Dan Lipinski (incumbent)	127,768	77.10
Republican	Raymond G. Wardingley	37,954	22.90
Total votes		165,722	100.0

Illinois 3rd congressional district Democratic primary, 2008
Party	Candidate	Votes	%
Democratic	Dan Lipinski (incumbent)	62,439	53.81
Democratic	Mark N. Pera	29,544	25.46
Democratic	Jim Capparelli	13,312	11.47
Democratic	Jerry Bennett	10,742	9.26
Total votes		116,037	100.0

Illinois 3rd congressional district general election, 2008
Party	Candidate	Votes	%
Democratic	Dan Lipinski (incumbent)	172,581	73.28
Republican	Michael Hawkins	50,336	21.37
Green	Jerome Pohlen	12,607	5.35
Total votes		235,524	100.0

Illinois 3rd congressional district Democratic primary, 2010
Party	Candidate	Votes	%
Democratic	Dan Lipinski (incumbent)	57,684	77.89
Democratic	Jorge Mujica	16,372	22.11
Total votes		74,056	100.0

Illinois 3rd congressional district general election, 2010
Party	Candidate	Votes	%
Democratic	Dan Lipinski (incumbent)	116,120	69.69
Republican	Michael A Bendas	40,479	24.29
Green	Laurel Lambert Schmidt	10,028	6.02
Total votes		166,627	100.0

Illinois 3rd congressional district Democratic primary, 2012
Party	Candidate	Votes	%
Democratic	Dan Lipinski (incumbent)	44,532	87.33
Democratic	Farah Bagai	6,463	12.67
Total votes		50,995	100.0

Illinois 3rd congressional district general election, 2012
Party	Candidate	Votes	%
Democratic	Dan Lipinski (incumbent)	168,738	68.48
Republican	Richard L. Grabowski	77,653	31.52
Write-in votes	Laura Anderson	7	0.00
Total votes		246,398	100.0

Illinois 3rd congressional district general election, 2014
Party	Candidate	Votes	%
Democratic	Dan Lipinski (incumbent)	116,764	64.56
Republican	Sharon M. Brannigan	64,091	35.44
Total votes		180,855	100.0

Illinois 3rd congressional district general election, 2016
Party	Candidate	Votes	%
Democratic	Dan Lipinski (incumbent)	225,320	99.96
Write-in votes	Diane Harris	91	0.04
Total votes		225,411	100.0

Illinois 3rd congressional district Democratic primary, 2018
Party	Candidate	Votes	%
Democratic	Dan Lipinski (incumbent)	48,675	51.13
Democratic	Marie Newman	46,530	48.87
Total votes		95,205	100.0

Illinois 3rd congressional district general election, 2018
Party	Candidate	Votes	%
Democratic	Dan Lipinski (incumbent)	163,053	73.01
Republican	Arthur J. Jones	57,885	25.92
Write-in votes	Justin Hanson	1,353	0.61
Write-in votes	Kenneth Yerkes	1,039	0.47
Write-in votes	Richard Mayers	4	0.00
Total votes		223,334	100.0

Illinois 3rd congressional district Democratic primary, 2020
Party	Candidate	Votes	%
Democratic	Marie Newman	52,384	47.26
Democratic	Dan Lipinski (incumbent)	49,568	44.72
Democratic	Rush Darwish	6,351	5.73
Democratic	Charles Hughes	2,549	2.30
Total votes		110,852	100.0

== Post-congressional career ==
Lipinski has appeared on podcasts, spoken publicly, and published writing about his experience in Congress.

In October 2021, he teased the possibility of running for his old congressional seat again, but was not a candidate in the 2022 election.

== Personal life ==
Lipinski is Catholic and has urged Catholics to put their faith first.

He is the son of William "Bill" Lipinski, who held his congressional seat previously.

U.S. House of Representatives
Preceded by Bill Lipinski	Member of the U.S. House of Representatives from Illinois's 3rd congressional district 2005–2021	Succeeded by Marie Newman
Party political offices
Preceded by Jim Cooper	Chair of the Blue Dog Coalition for Policy; 2017–2019; Served alongside: Jim Costa (Administration), Henry Cuellar (Communications)	Succeeded by Tom O'Halleran
U.S. order of precedence (ceremonial)
Preceded by Jesse Jackson Jr. as Former U.S. Representative	Order of precedence of the United States as Former U.S. Representative	Succeeded by Tom Coleman as Former U.S. Representative
