= Bobby Rush =

American politician (born 1946)

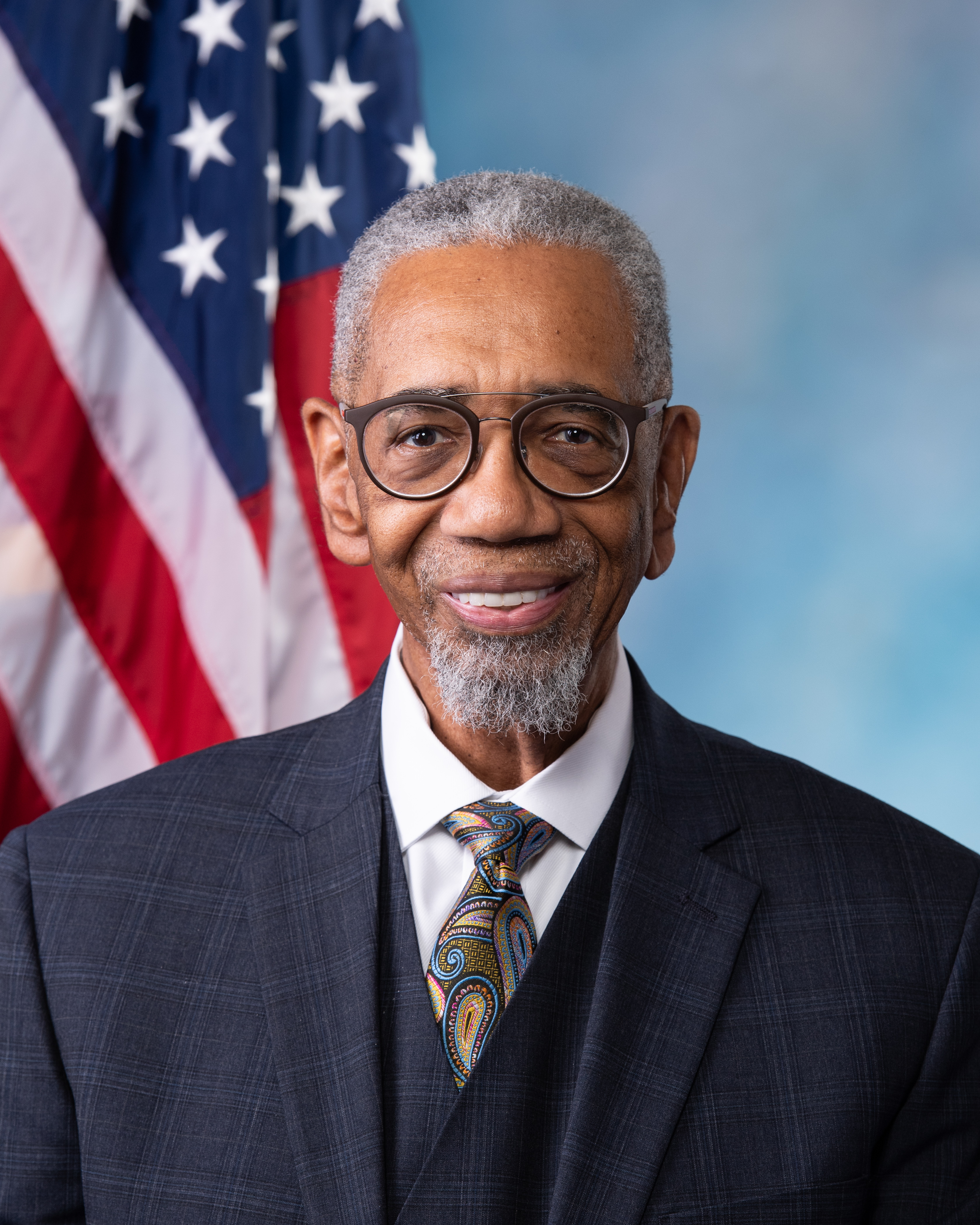
- Official portrait, 2018

Member of the U.S. House of Representatives from Illinois's 1st district
- In office January 3, 1993 – January 3, 2023
- Preceded by: Charles Hayes
- Succeeded by: Jonathan Jackson

Member of the Chicago City Council from the 2nd ward
- In office April 29, 1983 – January 3, 1993
- Preceded by: William Barnett
- Succeeded by: Madeline Haithcock

Personal details
- Born: Bobby Lee Rush; November 23, 1946 (age 79) Albany, Georgia, U.S.
- Party: Democratic (1974–present)
- Other political affiliations: Black Panther (1968–1974)
- Spouses: Sandra Milan (m. 1965; div. 1973); Carolyn Thomas (m. 1980; died 2017); Paulette Holloway (m. 2018)
- Education: Roosevelt University (BGS); University of Illinois, Chicago (MA); McCormick Theological Seminary (MA)

Military service
- Branch/service: United States Army
- Years of service: 1963–1968
- Rush's voice Rush on the Darfur genocide. Recorded September 20, 2006

Bobby Lee Rush (born November 23, 1946) is an American politician, activist, and pastor who served as the U.S. representative for Illinois's 1st congressional district from 1993 to 2023. A civil rights activist during the 1960s, Rush co-founded the Illinois chapter of the Black Panther Party.

Rush was first elected to Congress in 1992 and won consecutive reelections until his retirement. A member of the Democratic Party, Rush is the only politician to have defeated Barack Obama in an election, which he did in the 2000 Democratic primary for Illinois's 1st congressional district.

Rush's district was originally principally on the South Side of Chicago, with a population from 2003 to early 2013 that was 65% African-American, a higher proportion than any other congressional district. In 2011 the Illinois General Assembly redistricted this area after the 2010 census. Although still minority-majority, since early 2013 it is 51.3% African American, 36.1% White, 9.8% Hispanic, and 2% Asian. On January 3, 2022, Rush announced that he was retiring from Congress.

== Early life, education, and activism ==
Rush was born on November 23, 1946, in Albany, Georgia. After his parents separated when Rush was 7 years old, his mother took him and his siblings to Chicago, Illinois, joining the Great Migration of African Americans out of the South in the first part of the 20th century. In 1963, Rush dropped out of high school before graduating and joined the U.S. Army. While stationed in Chicago in 1966, he joined the Student Nonviolent Coordinating Committee, which had helped obtain national civil rights legislation passed in 1964 and 1965. In 1968, he went AWOL from the Army and co-founded the Illinois chapter of the Black Panthers. He later finished his Army service, receiving an honorable discharge.

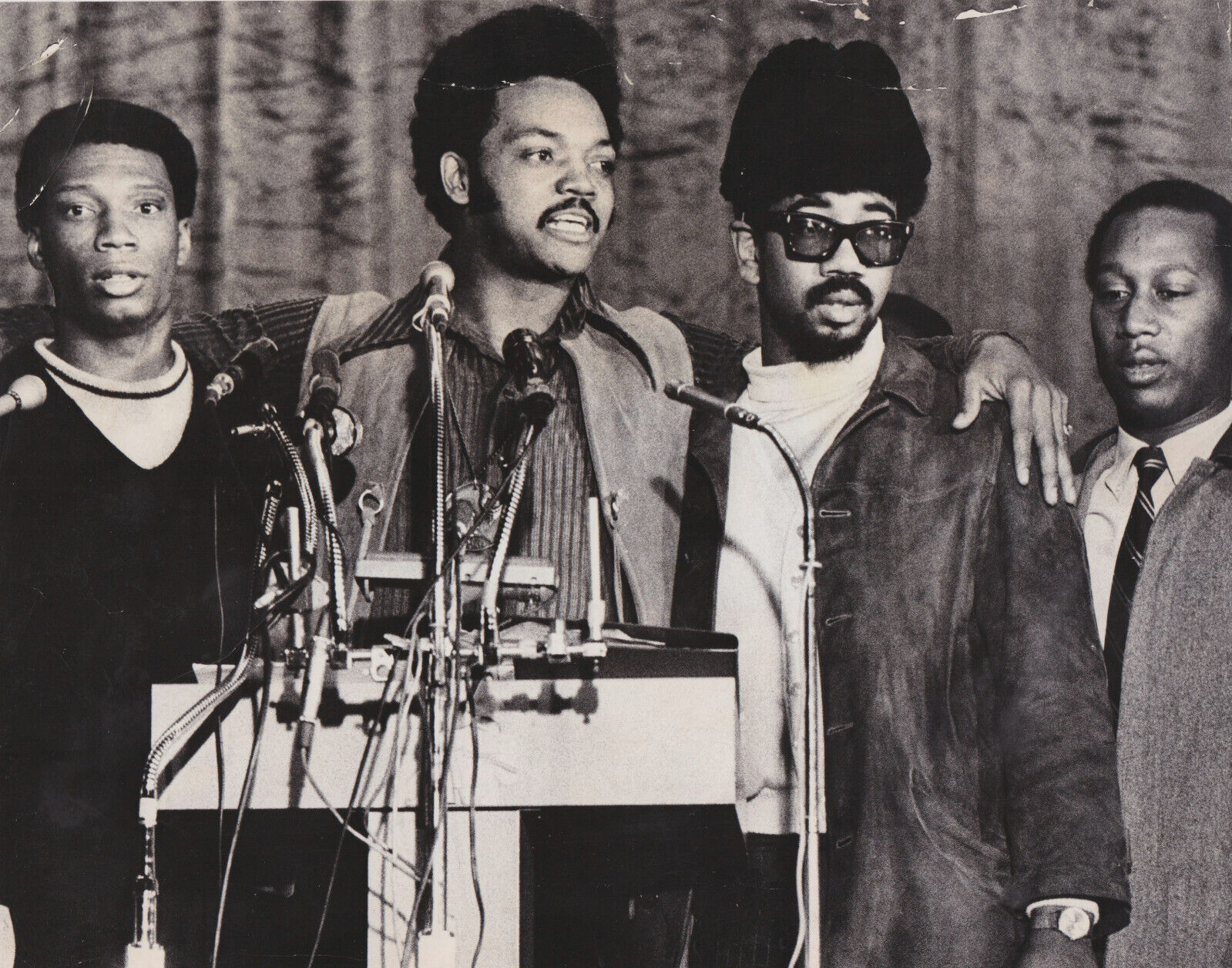
Rush (second from right), wanted for questioning, surrenders to police on stage at the Capitol Theater in Chicago during an Operation Breadbasket meeting, December 7, 1969 Left to right: William Hampton, brother of Fred Hampton; Jesse Jackson, national director of Operation Breadbasket; Bobby Rush, defense minister of the Illinois Black Panther Party; Renault Robinson, president of the Afro-American Patrolmen's League.

Throughout the 1960s, Rush was involved in the civil rights movement and worked in civil disobedience campaigns in the southern United States. After co-founding the Illinois chapter of the Black Panther Party in 1968, he served as its defense minister. After the Chicago Police Department and the State's Attorney Office assassinated Black Panther Fred Hampton in a police raid, Rush said, "We needed to arm ourselves", and called the police "pigs". Earlier that year, Rush had discussed the philosophy of his membership in the Black Panthers, saying, "Black people have been on the defensive for all these years. The trend now is not to wait to be attacked. We advocate offensive violence against the power structure." After Hampton's death, Rush became acting chairman of the Illinois Black Panther Party. He worked on several nonviolent projects that built support for the Black Panthers in African-American communities, such as coordinating a medical clinic which offered sickle-cell anemia testing on an unprecedented scale. Rush was imprisoned for six months in 1972 on a weapons charge after carrying a pistol into a police station. In 1974, he left the Black Panthers, who were already in decline. "We started glorifying thuggery and drugs", he told People. A deeply religious born-again Christian, Rush said, "I don't repudiate any of my involvement in the Panther party—it was part of my maturing."

== Formal education ==
Rush earned his Bachelor of General Studies with honors from Roosevelt University in 1973, and a Master's degree in political science from University of Illinois at Chicago in 1974. He completed a degree in theological studies at McCormick Theological Seminary in 1998. On May 13, 2017, Rush received a Doctorate of Humanities, honoris causa, from the Illinois Institute of Technology (IIT) for his outstanding contributions to Chicago.

== Politics ==
=== Chicago politics ===
In 1975, Rush ran for a seat on the Chicago City Council, the first of several black activist to seek political office, and lost to incumbent alderman William Barnett, receiving 23% of the vote to Barnett's 55% and Larry S. Bullock's 21%. He ran again in 1983 and won, alongside Harold Washington's victory as Chicago's first black mayor. Rush supported Washington's coalition during the Council Wars that followed the 1983 election. Rush's allies in the black-power movement abandoned the Democrats in the wake of the political turmoil that followed the sudden death of Washington in 1987, and formed their own political party, naming it after Washington. Rush infuriated Harold Washington Party leaders by spurning their candidates for local offices and sometimes backing white Democrats instead. He worked with the Democrats and was rewarded with the deputy chairmanship of the state party.

=== Congressional elections ===
After redistricting in 1992, Rush ran in Illinois's newly redrawn 1st congressional district, which included much of Chicago's South Side. The district had a high proportion of African-American residents; it has been represented by Black congressmen since 1929. Rush defeated incumbent U.S. Representative Charles Hayes and six other candidates in the Democratic primary election. He won the general election with 83% of the vote. (The 1st is so heavily Democratic that Rush had all but assured himself of a seat in Congress with his primary win.) The district has been in Democratic hands since 1935.

In the 2000 Democratic primary for the district, Rush was challenged by Illinois State Senator Barack Obama. During the primary, Rush said, "Barack Obama went to Harvard and became an educated fool. Barack is a person who read about the civil rights protests and thinks he knows all about it."

Rush claimed Obama was insufficiently rooted in Chicago's black neighborhoods to represent constituents' concerns. Obama said Rush was a part of "a politics that is rooted in the past" and said he could build bridges with whites to get things done. But while Obama did well in his own Hyde Park base, he did not get enough support from the surrounding black neighborhoods. Starting with 10% name recognition, Obama eventually gained 30% of the vote, losing by more than 2 to 1 despite winning among white voters. Rush won 61% of the vote, and won the general election with 88% of the vote.

=== Subsequent Chicago politics ===
In 1999, Rush ran for mayor of Chicago, but lost to incumbent Richard M. Daley, an ethnic Irish American whose father had long controlled the city as mayor. He remained active in city and regional politics.

In 2013, Rush criticized U.S. Senator Mark Kirk's proposal that 18,000 members of the Chicago gang "Gangster Disciples" be arrested, calling Kirk's suggestion "headline grabbing" and an "upper-middle-class, elitist white boy solution to a problem he knows nothing about". A spokesman for Kirk said Kirk had dealt with the issues for decades.

Also in 2013, Alex Clifford was forced to resign as CEO of Metra commuter rail agency, but soon after he left, a memo was released indirectly accusing Rush of using his political power to steer a $50,000 contract to a Washington-based business group.

=== Endorsements ===
In the 2015 Chicago mayoral election, Rush endorsed Mayor Rahm Emanuel in Emanuel's runoff reelection campaign against Jesus "Chuy" Garcia.

In the 2019 Chicago mayoral election, Rush endorsed Bill Daley in the first round and Toni Preckwinkle in the runoff.

Though a very close friend of former President Bill Clinton and his wife, Hillary Clinton, Rush announced early on in the 2008 Democratic primaries that he would support Obama. After Obama won the presidency and vacated his Senate seat, Rush said that an African American should be appointed to the seat: "With the resignation of President-elect Obama, we now have no African-Americans in the United States Senate, and we believe it will be a national disgrace to not have this seat filled by one of the many capable African-American Illinois politicians." Rush said he did not support any particular person and was not interested in the seat. On December 30, 2008, Governor Rod Blagojevich announced his appointment of Roland Burris, the former Attorney General of Illinois; Rush was present at the press conference and spoke in support of Burris.

Rush endorsed Kamala Harris in the 2020 Democratic presidential primary. After she dropped out, he endorsed Michael Bloomberg and became his campaign's national co-chair.

Rush endorsed incumbent Lori Lightfoot in the 2023 Chicago mayoral election. After Lightfoot failed to advance to the runoff, Rush endorsed Paul Vallas, who was backed by Chicago's Fraternal Order of Police. Vallas lost to progressive Cook County Commissioner Brandon Johnson.

== U.S. House of Representatives ==
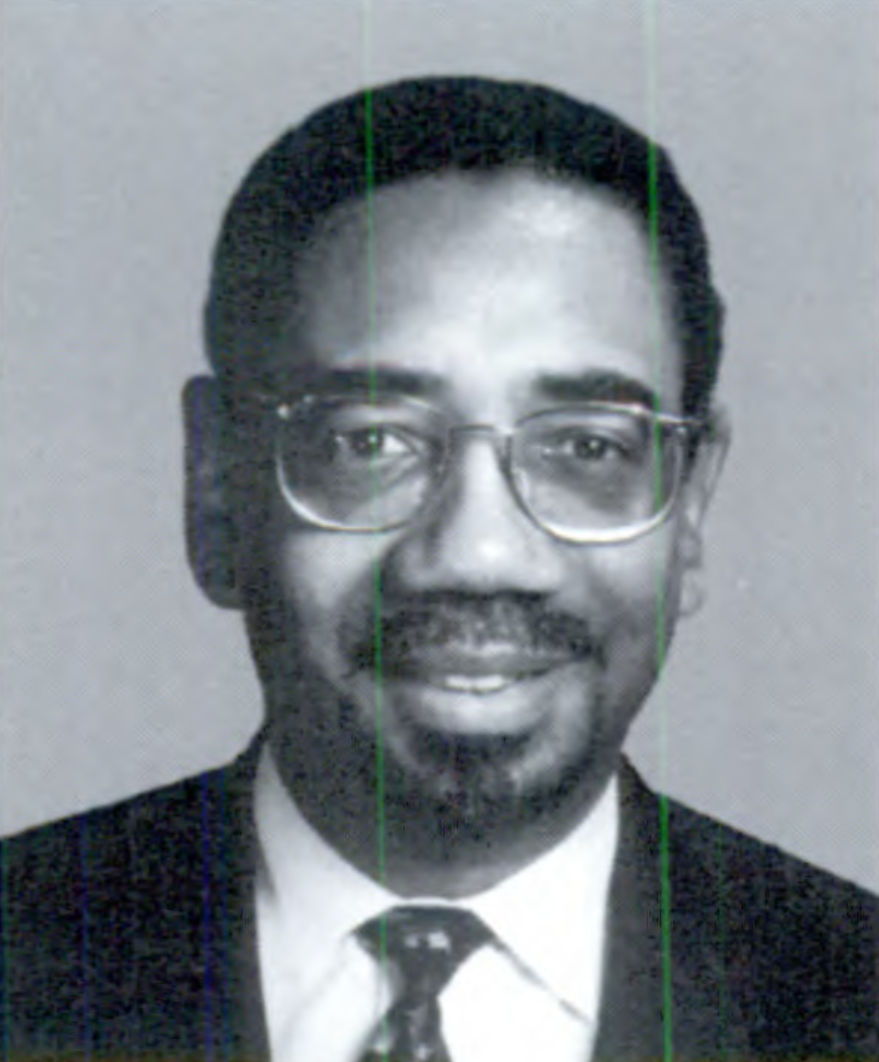
103rd Congress

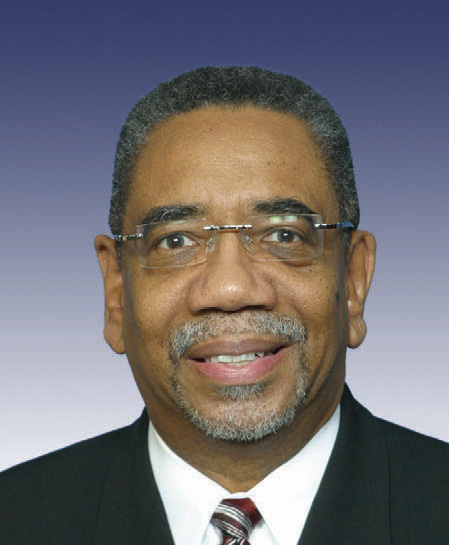
109th Congress

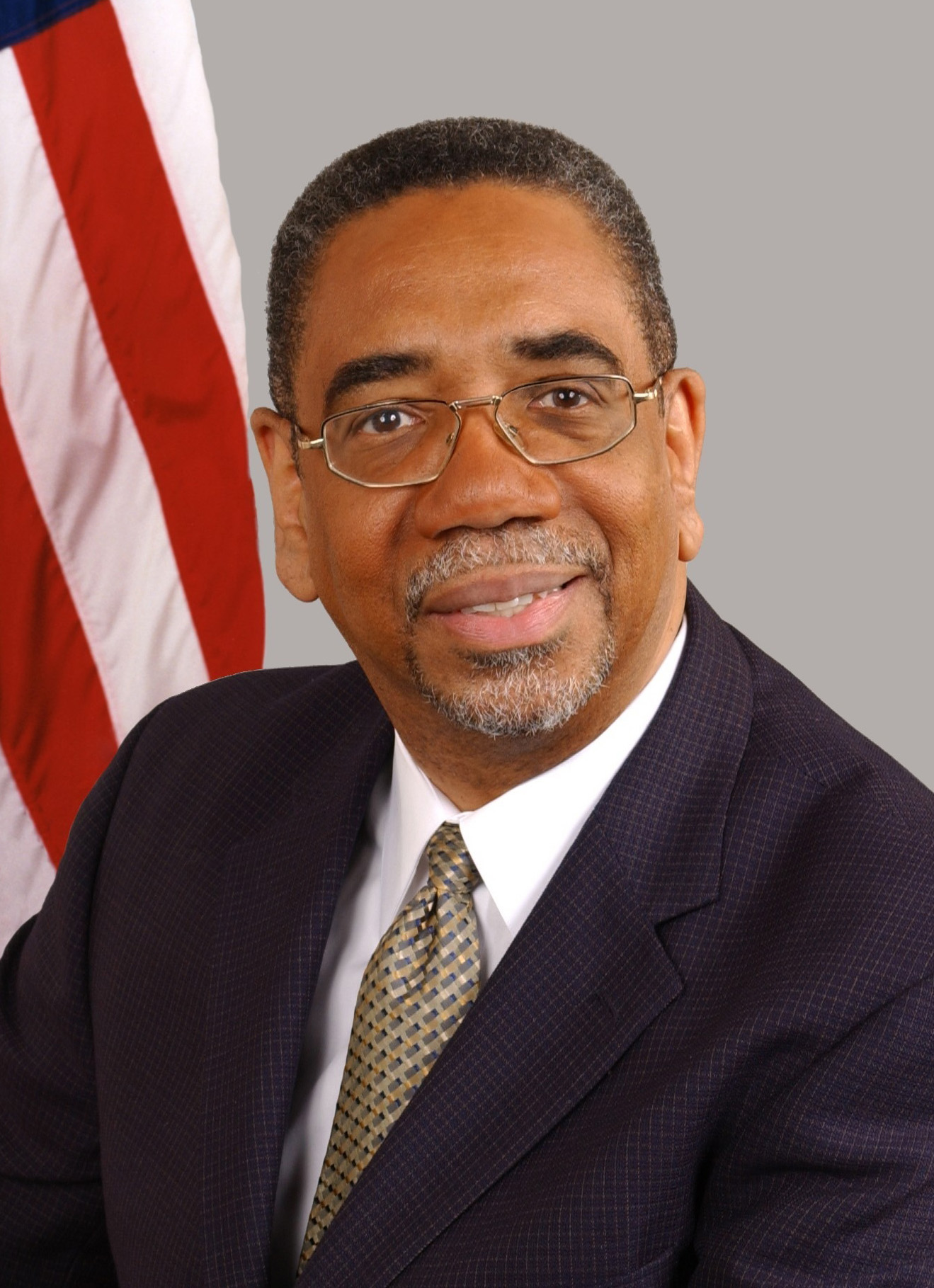
110th Congress

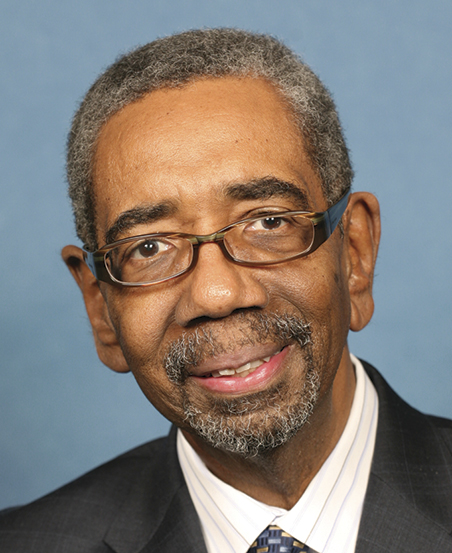
112th Congress

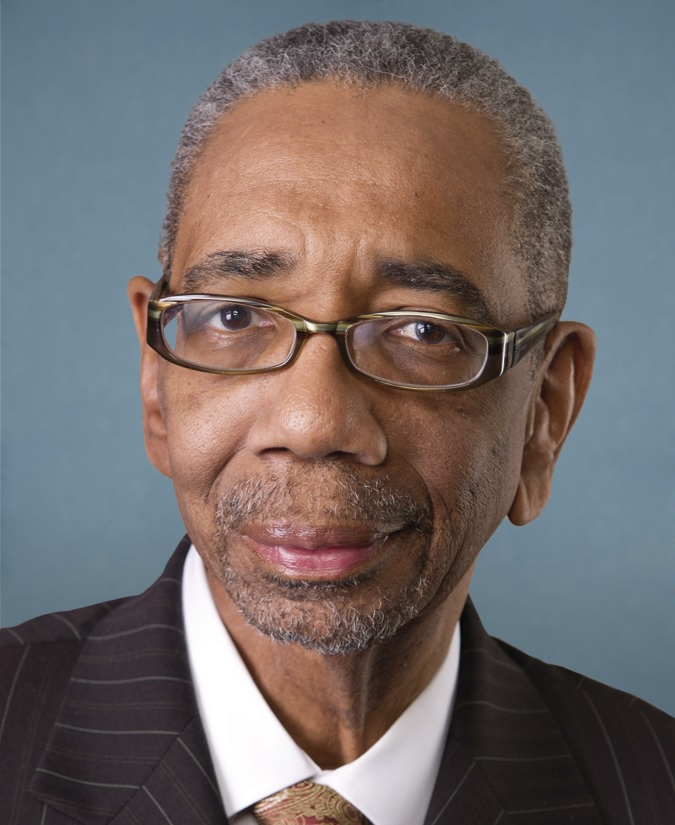
113th Congress

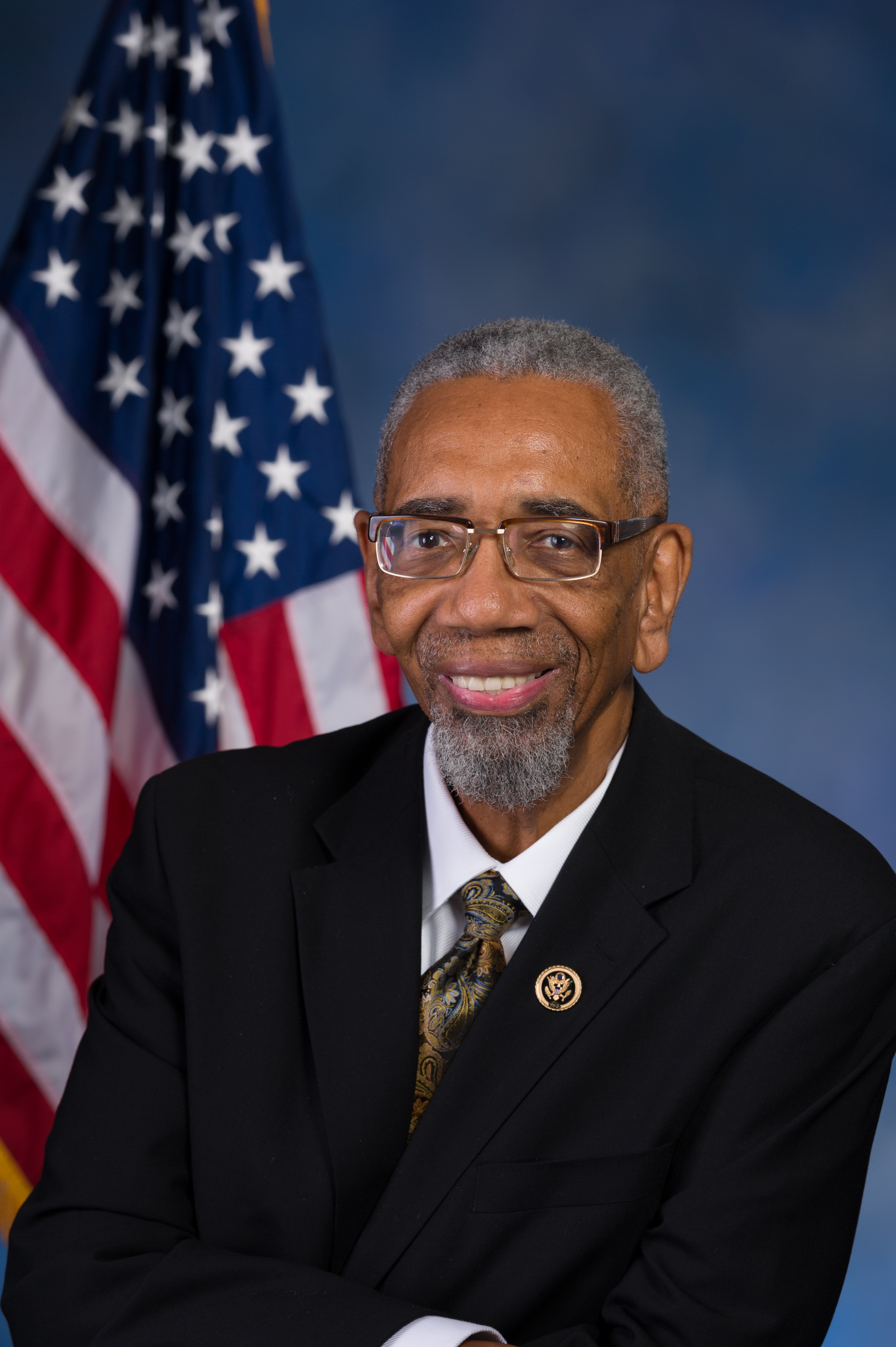
114th Congress

Rush had been considered a loyal Democrat during his tenure; in the 110th Congress, he voted with his party 97.8% of the time. Rush was a member of the Congressional Black Caucus and the House Baltic Caucus.

=== Issues ===
==== Fiscal and income ====
Rush initiated the Chicago Partnership for the Earned Income Tax Credit, an ongoing program designed to help low-income working Chicago residents receive the earned income tax credit, a federal income tax credit.

==== Healthcare ====
Rush sponsored the Nursing Relief for Disadvantaged Areas Act passed in 1999. The law temporarily addressed the nursing shortage by providing non-immigrant visas for qualified foreign nurses in Chicago's Englewood neighborhood and was reauthorized in 2005. Rush sponsored the Melanie Blocker-Stokes Postpartum Depression Research and Care Act, named for a Chicago native who jumped to her death from a 12th-story window due to postpartum depression. The bill would provide for research on postpartum depression and psychosis and services for people suffering from these disorders. The Children's Health Act, passed in 2000, incorporated Rush's Urban Asthma Reduction Act of 1999, amending the Preventive Health and Health Services Block Grant program and including an integrated approach to asthma management.

==== Energy ====
Rush was very outspoken against the GOP's No More Solyndras Bill, which would override a loan guarantee by the Energy Department to encourage research and development. The Energy Department provided a federal loan guarantee to the solar manufacturing company Solyndra to help with R&D. He said the No More Solyndras Bill would be better named the No More Innovation Bill.

==== Firearms ====
Rush introduced Blair Holt's Firearm Licensing and Record of Sale Act of 2009 on January 6, 2009. The bill would require all owners of handguns and semiautomatic firearms to register for a federal firearms license. All sales of the subject firearms would have to go through a licensed dealer. It would also make it illegal not to register as an owner of a firearm.

==== Darfur genocide ====
On July 15, 2004, Rush became the second sitting member of Congress, after Charles Rangel and before Joe Hoeffel, to be arrested for trespassing while protesting the genocide in Darfur and other violations of human rights in Sudan in front of the Sudanese Embassy.

==== Armed forces ====
On February 13, 2007, Rush opposed President George W. Bush's proposed 20,000-serviceman troop surge in Iraq. He said the troops' presence in Iraq was the greatest catalyst of violence there and advocated a political resolution of the situation. Rush said the troop surge would serve only to make the Iraqi situation more volatile.

==== Trayvon Martin ====
On March 28, 2012, Rush addressed the House while wearing a hoodie in honor of Trayvon Martin, a teenager who was shot in Florida by a local resident. He spoke against racial profiling. As the House forbids its members from wearing headgear as a breach of decorum, Rush was called out of order and escorted from the chamber.

==== Lynching ====
Rush twice introduced the Emmett Till Antilynching Act (named for Chicago teenager Emmett Till) to make lynching a federal crime. Federal anti-lynching legislation in Congress had been held up for about 100 years, but the Emmett Till Act finally became law in 2022.

=== Committee assignments ===
In the 115th United States Congress (January 3, 2017, to January 3, 2019):

- Committee on Energy and Commerce
  - Subcommittee on Communications and Technology
  - Subcommittee on Energy (Chair)

=== Missed votes ===
Rush's career average missed vote percentage is 15.7, much higher than the median missed vote percentage of 2.2 for members of the House. In the first session of the 114th session of Congress (January to December 2015), Rush missed 15.6% of the votes and ranked 12th in missed votes. He had the distinction of missing more votes than any other member of the House between 2007 and 2015: of 6,906 votes, Rush missed 1,549 (22.4%). Health issues for Rush and his wife were his main explanations for his high number of missed votes.

=== Ethics concerns and conflicts of interest ===
The Office of Congressional Ethics referred a matter involving Rush to the House Ethics Committee in 2014. The Office of Congressional Ethics report found he did not pay about $365,000 in rent for longtime use of an office to conduct politics. Rush has paid family members for years in questionable practices. He had a family member who for years worked for his church but was paid by a campaign supporter and friend. The Federal Election Commission questioned a Rush campaign-finance report that showed thousands of dollars spent on vague categories such as "campaign visibility" and "services rendered." His campaign paid his wife, Carolyn, $50,000 in 2015 for consulting, and his brother, Marlon Rush of Lansing, $13,000 in 2016 for two months' work as campaign manager, according to FEC reports. Oxford Media Group Inc., an Oak Brook company owned by multimillionaire businessman Joseph Stroud, paid the Commonwealth Edison bill—which was well past due, totaling $17,900 for Rush's Beloved Community Christian Church in 2010. Rush had personally been named in a ComEd lawsuit over the church's previous unpaid bills. Stroud was trying to break into the wireless phone industry dominated by Verizon and AT&T, and Rush was pushing for federal tax incentives that would give one of Stroud's other companies a leg up as a minority-owned business. A nonprofit Rush started got $1 million from the charitable arm of what is now AT&T for what turned out to be a failed effort to create a "technology center" in Englewood. At the time, the telecom giant was seeking support for legislation in a House committee of which Rush was a key member.

From 2001 to 2013, businesses counting on favorable actions by Rush in Congress donated roughly $1.7 million to his pet charities. Rush attracted more charitable corporate giving than any other Illinois congressman by a large margin, according to a Sunlight Foundation study of expenditures from 2009 to 2011. While it is impossible to assign cause and effect, at critical junctures Rush parted with fellow liberal Democrats in Congress to take pro-industry positions aligned with corporate benefactors SBC/AT&T, Comcast and ComEd.

=== Electoral history ===
Illinois 1st Congressional District General Election, 1992
Party	Candidate	Votes	%
Democratic	Bobby L. Rush	209,258	82.81
Republican	Jay Walker	43,453	17.19
Total votes		252,711	100.0

Illinois 1st Congressional District General Election, 1994
Party	Candidate	Votes	%
Democratic	Bobby L. Rush (incumbent)	112,474	75.73
Republican	William J. Kelly	36,038	24.27
Total votes		148,512	100.0

Illinois 1st Congressional District General Election, 1996
Party	Candidate	Votes	%
Democratic	Bobby L. Rush (incumbent)	174,005	85.67
Republican	Noel Naughton	25,659	12.63
Libertarian	Tim M. Griffin	3,449	1.70
Total votes		203,113	100.0

Illinois 1st Congressional District Democratic Primary, 1998
Party	Candidate	Votes	%
Democratic	Bobby L. Rush (incumbent)	85,696	88.82
Democratic	Caleb A. Davis, Jr.	10,785	11.18
Total votes		96,481	100.0

Illinois 1st Congressional District General Election, 1998
Party	Candidate	Votes	%
Democratic	Bobby L. Rush (incumbent)	151,890	87.11
Republican	Marlene White Ahimaz	18,429	10.57
Libertarian	Marjorie Kohls	4,046	2.32
Total votes		174,365	100.0

Illinois 1st Congressional District Democratic Primary, 2000
Party	Candidate	Votes	%
Democratic	Bobby L. Rush (incumbent)	59,599	61.98
Democratic	Barack Obama	29,649	30.83
Democratic	Donne E. Trotter	6,915	7.19
Total votes		96,163	100.0

Illinois 1st Congressional District General Election, 2000
Party	Candidate	Votes	%
Democratic	Bobby L. Rush (incumbent)	172,271	87.81
Republican	Raymond G. Wardingley	23,915	12.19
Total votes		196,186	100.0

Illinois 1st Congressional District General Election, 2002
Party	Candidate	Votes	%
Democratic	Bobby L. Rush (incumbent)	149,068	81.17
Republican	Raymond G. Wardingley	29,776	16.21
Libertarian	Dorothy G. Tsatsos	4,812	2.62
Total votes		183,656	100.0

Illinois 1st Congressional District General Election, 2004
Party	Candidate	Votes	%
Democratic	Bobby L. Rush (incumbent)	212,109	84.86
Republican	Raymond G. Wardingley	37,840	15.14
Total votes		249,949	100.0

Illinois 1st Congressional District Democratic Primary, 2006
Party	Candidate	Votes	%
Democratic	Bobby L. Rush (incumbent)	81,593	81.58
Democratic	Phillip Jackson	18,427	18.42
Total votes		100,020	100.0

Illinois 1st Congressional District General Election, 2006
Party	Candidate	Votes	%
Democratic	Bobby L. Rush (incumbent)	146,623	84.06
Republican	Jason E. Tabour	27,804	15.94
Total votes		174,427	100.0

Illinois 1st Congressional District Democratic Primary, 2008
Party	Candidate	Votes	%
Democratic	Bobby L. Rush (incumbent)	134,343	87.45
Democratic	William Walls, III	19,272	12.55
Total votes		153,615	100.0

Illinois 1st Congressional District General Election, 2008
Party	Candidate	Votes	%
Democratic	Bobby L. Rush (incumbent)	233,036	85.87
Republican	Antoine Members	38,361	14.13
Total votes		271,397	100.0

Illinois 1st Congressional District Democratic Primary, 2010
Party	Candidate	Votes	%
Democratic	Bobby L. Rush (incumbent)	68,585	79.70
Democratic	JoAnne Guillemette	8,035	9.34
Democratic	Fred Smith	5,203	6.05
Democratic	Harold L. Bailey	4,232	4.92
Total votes		86,055	100.0

Illinois 1st Congressional District General Election, 2010
Party	Candidate	Votes	%
Democratic	Bobby L. Rush (incumbent)	148,170	80.36
Republican	Raymond G. Wardingley	29,253	15.87
Green	Jeff Adams	6,963	3.78
Total votes		184,386	100.0

Illinois 1st Congressional District Democratic Primary, 2012
Party	Candidate	Votes	%
Democratic	Bobby L. Rush (incumbent)	64,533	83.85
Democratic	Raymond M. Lodato	3,210	4.17
Democratic	Harold L. Bailey	2,598	3.38
Democratic	Clifford M. Russell Jr.	2,412	3.13
Democratic	Fred Smith	2,232	2.90
Democratic	Jordan Sims	1,980	2.57
Total votes		76,965	100.0

Illinois 1st Congressional District General Election, 2012
Party	Candidate	Votes	%
Democratic	Bobby L. Rush (incumbent)	236,854	73.82
Republican	Donald E. Peloquin	83,989	26.18
Write-in votes	John Hawkins	1	0.00
Total votes		320,844	100.0

Illinois 1st Congressional District General Election, 2014
Party	Candidate	Votes	%
Democratic	Bobby L. Rush (incumbent)	162,268	73.09
Republican	Jimmy Lee Tillman	59,749	26.91
Total votes		222,017	100.0

Illinois 1st Congressional District Democratic Primary, 2016
Party	Candidate	Votes	%
Democratic	Bobby L. Rush (incumbent)	128,402	71.44
Democratic	Howard B. Brookins, Jr.	34,645	19.27
Democratic	O. Patrick Brutus	16,696	9.29
Total votes		179,743	100.0

Illinois 1st Congressional District General Election, 2016
Party	Candidate	Votes	%
Democratic	Bobby L. Rush (incumbent)	234,037	74.09
Republican	August (O'Neill) Deuser	81,817	25.90
Write-in votes	Tabitha Carson	8	0.00
Total votes		315,862	100.0

Illinois 1st Congressional District General Election, 2018
Party	Candidate	Votes	%
Democratic	Bobby L. Rush (incumbent)	189,560	73.51
Republican	Jimmy Lee Tillman, II	50,960	19.76
Independent	Thomas Rudbeck	17,365	6.73
Total votes		257,885	100.0

Illinois 1st Congressional District General Election, 2020
Party	Candidate	Votes	%
Democratic	Bobby L. Rush (incumbent)	239,943	73.08
Republican	Philanise White	85,027	25.01
Total votes		325,123	100.0

== Beloved Community Christian Church ==
Rush is pastor of the Beloved Community Christian Church in Chicago's Englewood neighborhood. Leaders of other Englewood nonprofit organizations complained that the church's programs—a community development corporation Rebirth of Englewood, a public health center, and a group serving teens convicted of crimes—received inordinate government aid and weighed heavily on their own efforts for renewal.

=== Unpaid taxes and wage garnishment ===
In 2013, Rush and his wife, the Beloved Community Christian Church of which Rush is pastor, and another nonprofit organization operating out of the church had tax delinquencies totaling $195,000, and the pattern of tax delinquency was a decade old. Unpaid taxes included property taxes, income taxes, and employee withholding taxes. New City Bank sued Rush and his wife for $500,000, claiming they failed to pay their property taxes in 2009. In 1994, Rush owed the IRS $55,000 in federal income taxes, according to Cook County records.

Since 2018, 15% of Rush's congressional salary has been garnished to repay more than $1 million he owes on a delinquent loan for the now-closed church he founded in Chicago. Cook County Circuit Judge Alexander White ordered Rush to repay the $550,000 loan that New City Bank granted him and seven other co-signers in 2005. With the money, Rush bought the former Our Redeemer Lutheran Church in Englewood and restyled it as the Beloved Community Church of God in Christ.

== Personal life ==
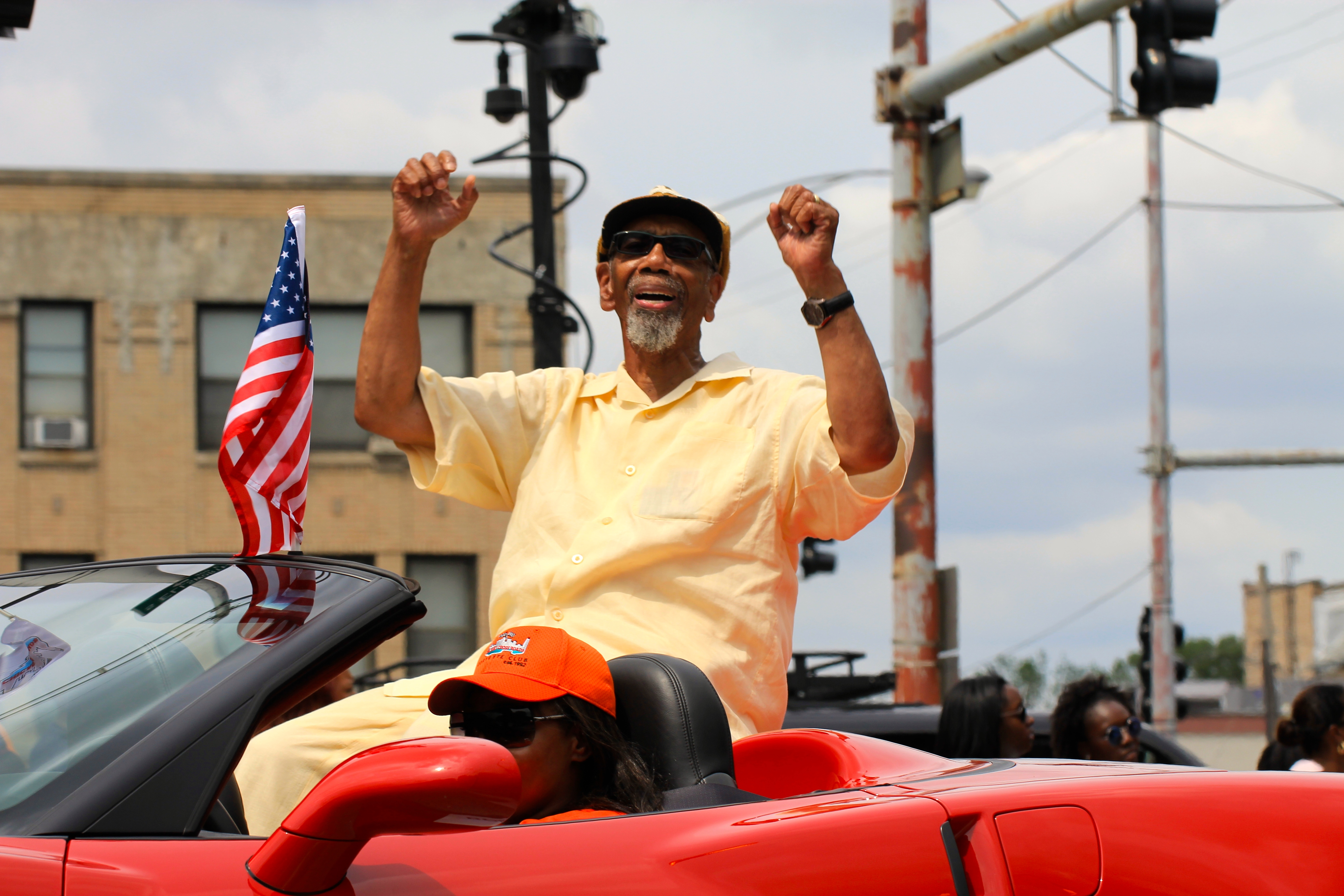
Rush at the Bud Billiken Parade and Picnic

Rush has been married three times. His first marriage, when he was 19, was to Sandra Milan. They had two children together and divorced in 1973. He was married to community organizer, precinct captain, and political strategist Carolyn Thomas from 1980 or 1981 until her death from congestive heart failure on March 13, 2017. Their blended family had seven surviving children at the time of her death. On June 30, 2018, Rush married minister and author Paulette Holloway.

Rush's son Huey Rich was murdered on the South Side of Chicago at age 29, in October 1999. He was named after Black Panther co-founder Huey P. Newton. Rich's mother was Saundra Rich, whom Rush never married. On October 18, 1999, Rich was approached outside his apartment building by Leo Foster and Darcell Prince, who falsely claimed to be police officers. They wore bulletproof vests, and carried walkie-talkies, guns, and badges, but Rich didn't believe them and ran. Foster and Prince chased and shot Rich, then stole several hundred dollars and keys from his pockets. He died in the hospital four days later from extensive blood loss. Foster told police that he and Prince were coming to collect $110,000 worth of cocaine that Rich had been paid to procure but hadn't delivered. Rich's friends didn't believe Foster's story, with some suggesting it may have been a case of mistaken identity. Rush said Rich "was involved in positive—as far as I know—endeavors", adding "as parents, we don't always know". Foster was sentenced to 60 years in prison for the murder and Prince to 50 years. The murder prompted Rush to prioritize efforts to reduce gun violence.

In 2008, Rush had a rare type of malignant tumor removed from his salivary gland. He is a member of Iota Phi Theta fraternity. According to a DNA analysis conducted under the auspices of the TV program Know Your Heritage, he is descended mainly from the Ashanti people of Ghana. Rush attributed his election to Congress to Tony Robbins. His heroes include Abraham Lincoln, Kit Carson, and Huey P. Newton.

In 2018, Rush's son Flynn Rush unsuccessfully ran for a seat in the Illinois House of Representatives, losing in the Democratic primary to Curtis Tarver.

== See also ==
- List of African-American United States representatives

U.S. House of Representatives
Preceded by Charles Hayes	Member of the U.S. House of Representatives from Illinois's 1st congressional district 1993–2023	Succeeded by Jonathan Jackson
U.S. order of precedence (ceremonial)
Preceded by Dan Burton as Former U.S. Representative	Order of precedence of the United States as Former U.S. Representative	Succeeded by Ileana Ros-Lehtinen as Former U.S. Representative
