= Jesse Jackson =

American minister, activist and politician (1941–2026)

The Reverend Jesse Jackson
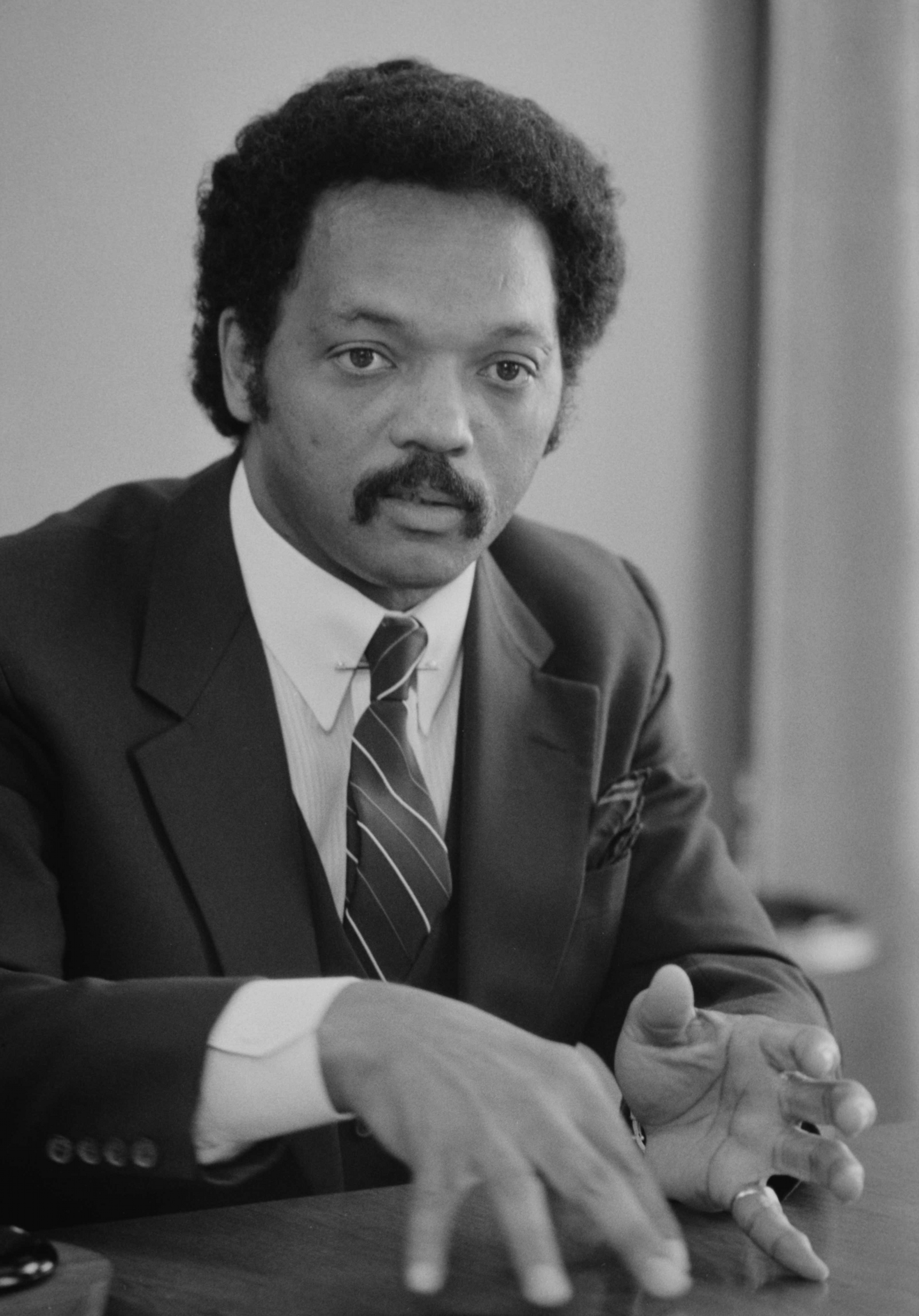
- Jackson in 1983
- Born: Jesse Louis Burns; October 8, 1941; Greenville, South Carolina, U.S.
- Died: February 17, 2026 (aged 84); Chicago, Illinois, U.S.
- Resting place: Oak Woods Cemetery
- Education: University of Illinois, Urbana-Champaign (attended); North Carolina A&T State University (BS); Chicago Theological Seminary (MDiv)
- Occupations: Activist, politician, Baptist minister
- Political party: Democratic
- Spouse: Jacqueline Brown (m. 1962)
- Children: 6, including Santita, Jesse Jr., Jonathan, and Yusef

United States Shadow Senator from the District of Columbia
- In office January 3, 1991 – January 3, 1997
- Preceded by: Seat established
- Succeeded by: Paul Strauss

Jesse Louis Jackson (né Burns; October 8, 1941 – February 17, 2026) was an American civil rights activist, LGBTQ rights activist, politician, and ordained Baptist minister. A protégé of Martin Luther King Jr. and James Bevel during the civil rights movement, he became one of the most prominent civil rights leaders of the late 20th and early 21st centuries, and an ardent advocate and early supporter of LGBTQ rights in the United States. From 1991 to 1997, he served as a shadow United States senator for the District of Columbia.

Born in Greenville, South Carolina, Jackson began his activism in the 1960s and founded the organizations that later merged to form the Rainbow/PUSH Coalition. Expanding his work into international affairs in the 1980s, he became a vocal critic of the Reagan administration and launched a presidential campaign in 1984. Initially viewed as a fringe candidate, he finished third for the Democratic nomination behind former vice president Walter Mondale and Senator Gary Hart. He continued his activism and mounted a second presidential bid in 1988, finishing as the runner‑up for the Democratic nomination to Massachusetts governor Michael Dukakis.

Jackson did not seek the presidency again, but in 1990, he was elected as the District of Columbia's shadow senator, serving one term during the H. W. Bush and Clinton administrations. Although initially critical of President Bill Clinton, he later became a supporter and friend. Jackson hosted Both Sides with Jesse Jackson on CNN from 1992 to 2000. A critic of police brutality, the Republican Party, and conservative policies, he was widely regarded as one of the most influential African‑American activists of his era.

== Early life and education ==
Jackson was born Jesse Louis Burns on October 8, 1941, in Greenville, South Carolina, to Helen Burns, an 18-year-old high school student, and her 33-year-old married neighbor Noah Louis Robinson. His ancestry included Cherokee, enslaved African-Americans, Irish plantation owners, and a Confederate sheriff. A former professional boxer, Robinson worked for a textile brokerage and was well known in the black community. A year after Jesse's birth, his mother married Charles Henry Jackson, a post-office maintenance worker who later adopted him. Jesse took his stepfather's surname, though he also maintained a close relationship with Robinson as he grew up. He said he considered both men his fathers.

As a child, Jesse Jackson was taunted by other children about his out‑of‑wedlock birth, and he said those experiences helped motivate him to succeed. Living under Jim Crow segregation laws, he was taught to go to the back of the bus and to use separate water fountains—practices he accepted until the Montgomery bus boycott of 1955. He attended a racially segregated school, Sterling High School in Greenville, where he was elected student class president, finished 10th in his class, and earned letters in baseball, football, and basketball.

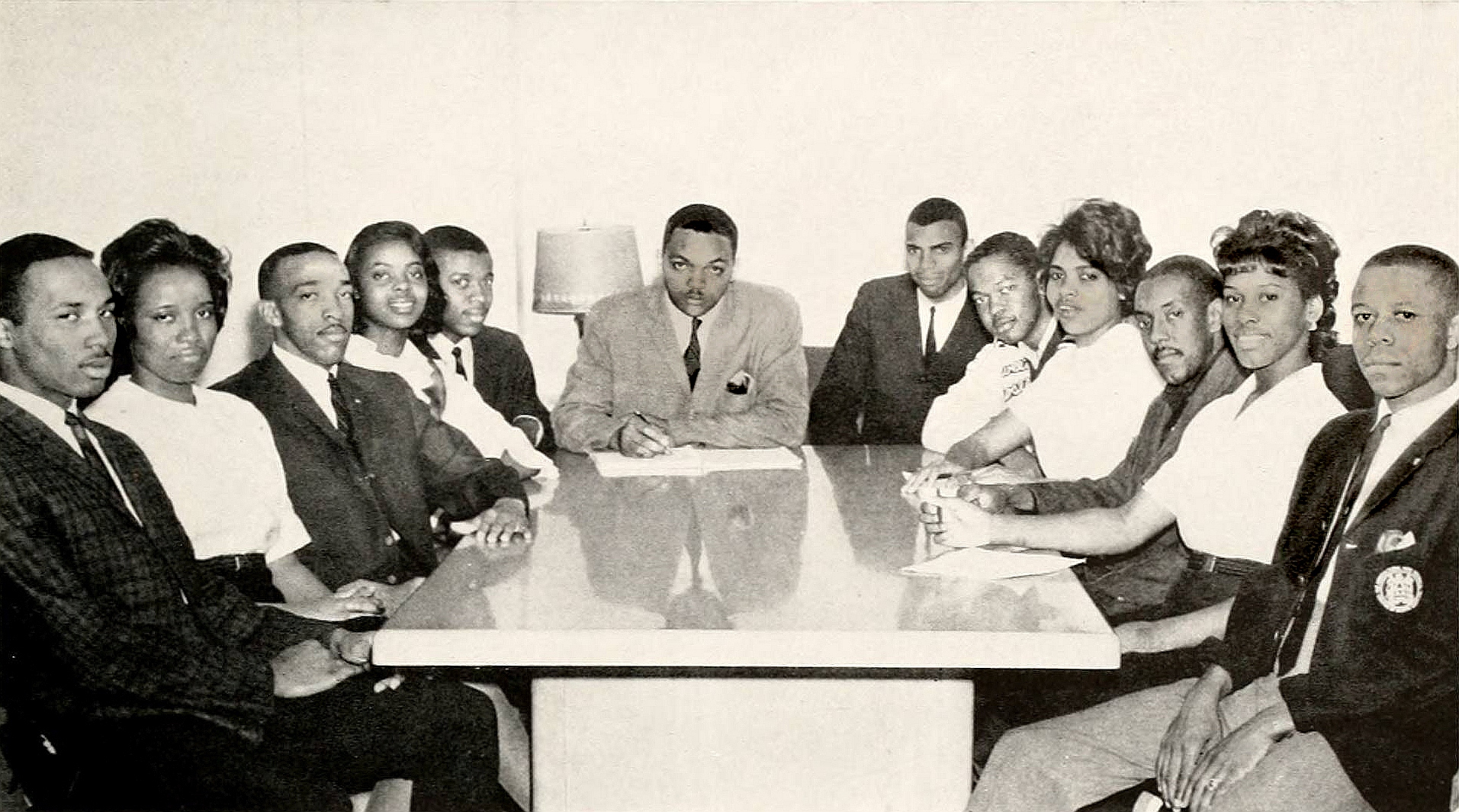
Jackson (center) with members of the Student Government at North Carolina A&T, c. 1964

After graduating from high school in 1959, Jackson rejected a contract from a minor-league professional baseball team so that he could attend the University of Illinois on a football scholarship. After his second semester at the predominantly white college, he transferred to North Carolina A&T, a historically black university in Greensboro, North Carolina. Accounts of the reasons for the transfer differed, though Jackson said he changed schools because racial prejudice prevented him from playing quarterback and limited his participation on a competitive public‑speaking team.

Writing an article on ESPN.com in 2002, sociologist Harry Edwards noted that the University of Illinois had previously had a black quarterback, but also observed that black athletes attending predominantly white colleges during the 1950s and 1960s encountered a "combination of culture shock and discrimination". Edwards suggested that Jackson left the University of Illinois in 1960 because he had been placed on academic probation, but the university's president reported in 1987 that Jackson's 1960 freshman transcript was clean and that he would have been eligible to re-enroll at any time.

At A&T, Jackson played quarterback and was elected student body president. He became active in local civil-rights protests against segregated libraries, theaters, and restaurants. He graduated with a B.S. degree in sociology in 1964, then attended the Chicago Theological Seminary on a scholarship. He left the seminary in 1966, three classes short of earning his master's degree, to focus full-time on the civil rights movement. He was ordained a minister in 1968 and was awarded a Master of Divinity degree by Chicago Theological Seminary in 2000, based on his previously earned credits and his subsequent work and life experience.

== Civil rights activism ==
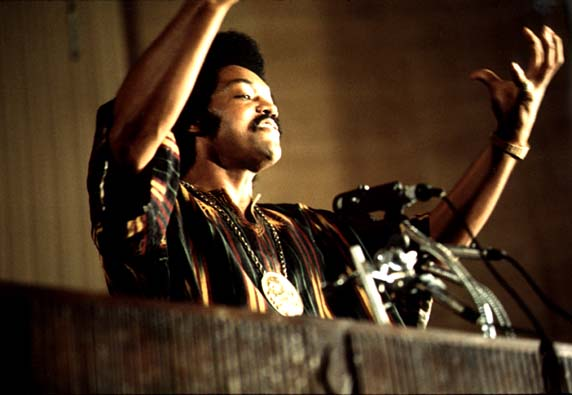
Jackson speaks on a radio broadcast from the headquarters of Operation PUSH (People United to Save Humanity) at its annual convention. July 1973. Photograph by John H. White

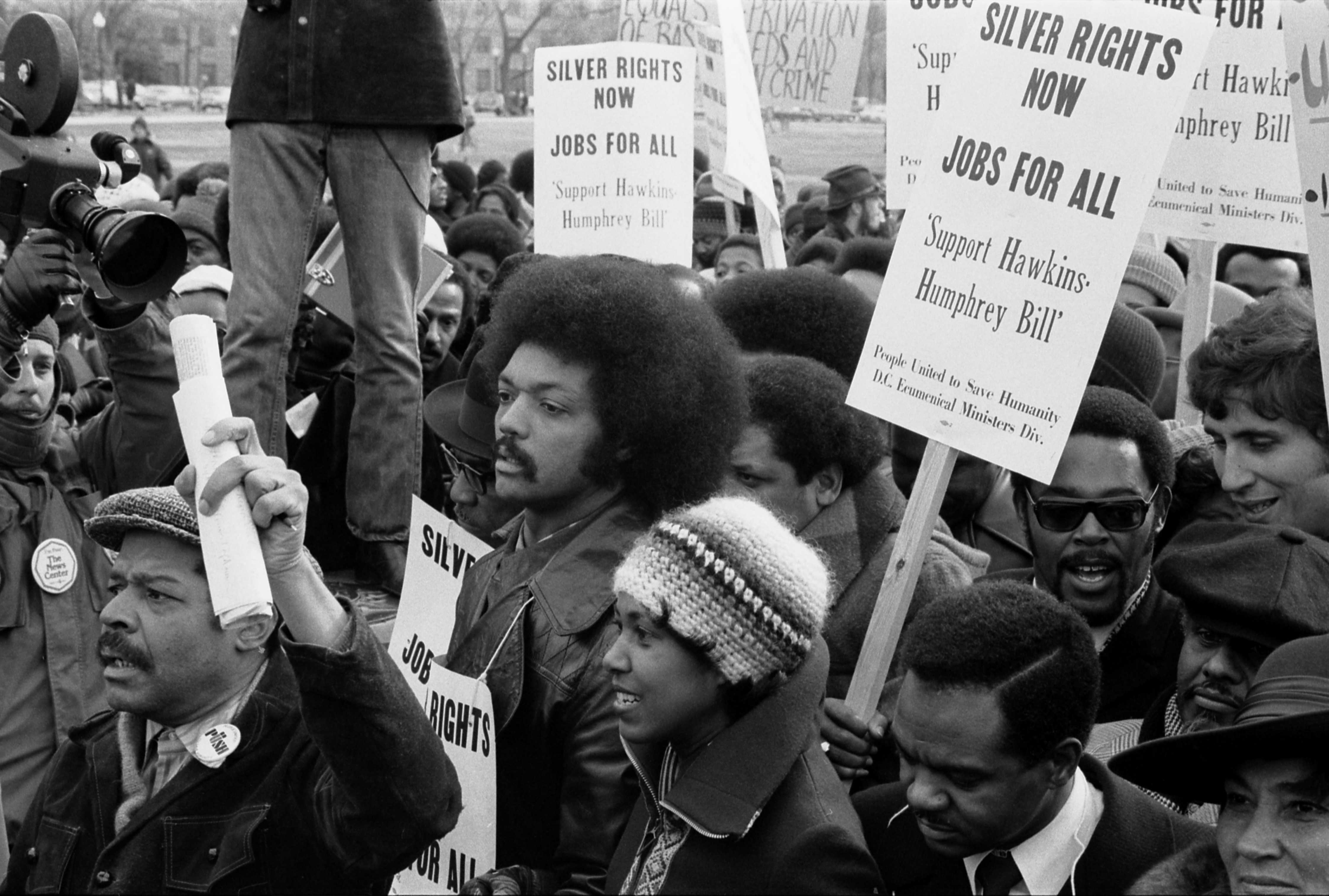
Jackson surrounded by marchers carrying signs advocating support for the Hawkins-Humphrey Bill for full employment, January 1975

=== SCLC and Operation Breadbasket ===
Jackson was known for commanding public attention since he first started working for Martin Luther King Jr. In 1965 he participated in the Selma to Montgomery marches organized by James Bevel, King, and other civil rights leaders in Alabama. Impressed by Jackson's drive and organizational abilities, King soon began giving Jackson a role in the Southern Christian Leadership Conference (SCLC), though he was concerned about Jackson's apparent ambition and attention-seeking. When Jackson returned from Selma, he was charged with establishing a frontline office for the SCLC in Chicago.

In 1966, King and Bevel selected Jackson to head the Chicago branch of the SCLC's economic arm, Operation Breadbasket, and he was promoted to national director in 1967. Operation Breadbasket had been started by the Atlanta leadership of the SCLC as a job placement agency for blacks. Under Jackson's leadership, a key goal was to encourage massive boycotts by black consumers as a means to pressure white-owned businesses to hire blacks and to purchase goods and services from black-owned firms.

T. R. M. Howard, a 1950s proponent of the consumer boycott tactic, soon became a major supporter of Jackson's efforts—donating and raising funds, and introducing Jackson to prominent members of the black business community in Chicago. Under Jackson's direction, Operation Breadbasket held popular weekly workshops on Chicago's South Side featuring white and black political and economic leaders, and religious services complete with a jazz band and choir.

Jackson became involved in SCLC leadership disputes after King's assassination on April 4, 1968. When King was shot on the balcony of his room at the Lorraine Motel in Memphis, Tennessee, Jackson was in the parking lot one floor below. He told reporters he was the last person to speak to King, and that King died in his arms, an account that several King aides who were present disputed. In the wake of King's death, Jackson worked on SCLC's Poor People's Campaign in Washington, D.C., and was credited with managing its 15-acre tent city, but he began to clash with Ralph Abernathy, King's successor as SCLC chairman. In 1969, The New York Times reported that several black leaders viewed Jackson as King's successor and that Jackson was one of the few black activists who was preaching racial reconciliation. Jackson believed a conspiracy was involved in King's murder. In 1978, he met for four hours with King's convicted assassin, James Earl Ray. Jackson said that Ray was involved in King's assassination but did not kill him, and that others who were involved were "still walking the streets".

One notable activist involved with Operation Breadbasket who later gained greater prominence was a then-teenage Al Sharpton, who Jackson mentored early on in life and later appointed as youth director of Operation Breadbasket's Brooklyn branch in 1969.

Jackson reportedly was seeking to form a coalition with whites in order to approach what were considered racial problems as economic and class problems. "When we change the race problem into a class fight between the haves and the have-nots, then we are going to have a new ball game", he said. In the 21st century, some public school systems are working on an approach for affirmative action that deals with family income rather than race, recognizing that some minority members have been very successful. The Times also indicated that Jackson was being criticized as too involved with middle-class blacks and for having an unattainable goal of racial unity.

In the spring of 1971, Abernathy ordered Jackson to move the national office of Operation Breadbasket from Chicago to Atlanta and sought to place another person in charge of local Chicago activities, but Jackson refused to move. He organized the October 1971 Black Expo in Chicago, a trade and business fair to promote black capitalism and grass roots political power. The five-day event was attended by black businessmen from 40 states, as well as politicians such as Cleveland Mayor Carl Stokes, and Chicago Mayor Richard J. Daley. Daley's presence was seen as a testament to the growing political and economic power of blacks.

In December 1971, Jackson and Abernathy had a complete falling out, with the split described as part of a leadership struggle between Jackson, who had a national profile, and Abernathy, whose prominence from the Civil Rights Movement was beginning to wane. The break began when Abernathy questioned the handling of receipts from the Black Expo, and then suspended Jackson as leader of Operation Breadbasket for not obtaining permission to form non-profit corporations. Al Sharpton, then youth group leader of the SCLC, left the organization to protest Jackson's treatment and formed the National Youth Movement. Jackson, his entire Breadbasket staff, and 30 of the 35 board members resigned from the SCLC and began planning a new organization. Time magazine quoted Jackson as saying at that time that the traditional civil rights movement had lost its "offensive thrust".

=== Operation PUSH and the Rainbow Coalition ===
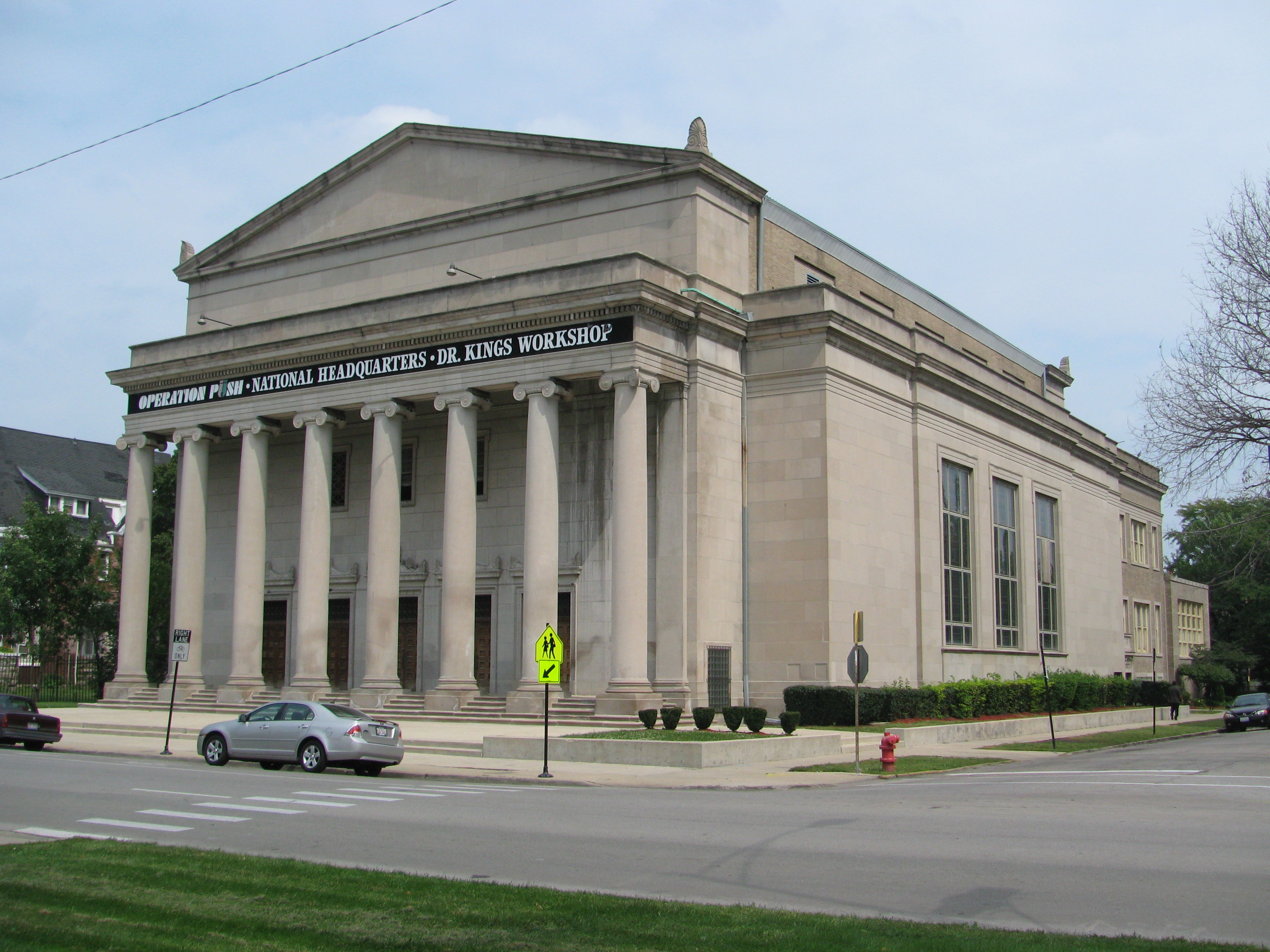
The Rainbow/PUSH national headquarters in Kenwood, Chicago

People United to Save Humanity (Operation PUSH) officially began operations on December 25, 1971; Jackson later changed the name to People United to Serve Humanity. T. R. M. Howard was installed as a member of the board of directors and chair of the finance committee. At its inception, Jackson planned to orient Operation PUSH toward politics and to pressure politicians to work to improve economic opportunities for blacks and poor people of all races. SCLC officials reportedly felt the new organization would help black businesses more than it would help the poor.

In 1978, Jackson called for a closer relationship between blacks and the Republican Party, telling the Party's National Committee that "Black people need the Republican Party to compete for us so we can have real alternatives... The Republican Party needs black people if it is ever to compete for national office." In 1983, Jackson and Operation PUSH led a boycott of beer giant Anheuser-Busch, criticizing the level of minority employment in its distribution network. In 1996, Jackson family friend Ron Burkle introduced Anheuser-Busch CEO August Busch IV to Yusef Jackson, Jesse's son. In 1998, Anheuser-Busch chose Yusef and his brother Jonathan to head River North Sales, a Chicago beer distribution company. The Chicago Tribune noted these moves in a 2001 front-page story. "There is no causal connection between the boycott in 1983 and me meeting in the middle '90s and me buying this company in 1998", Yusef said in a 2005 interview with Crain's Chicago Business.

In 1984, Jackson organized the Rainbow Coalition and resigned as president of Operation PUSH to run for president of the United States, though he remained involved as chairman of the board. PUSH's activities were described in 1987 as conducting boycotts of businesses to induce them to provide more jobs and business to blacks and as running programs for housing, social services, and voter registration. The organization was funded by contributions from businesses and individuals. In early 1987, the continued existence of Operation PUSH was imperiled by debt, a fact that Jackson's political opponents used during his race for the 1988 Democratic Party nomination. In the mid-1990s, the Operation PUSH and Rainbow Coalition organizations merged.

=== Other civil rights activism ===
On July 16, 1960, while he was home from college, Jackson joined seven other African Americans in a sit-in at the Greenville Public Library in Greenville, South Carolina, which only allowed white people. The group was arrested for "disorderly conduct". Jackson's pastor paid their bond, the Greenville News said. DeeDee Wright, another member of the group, later said they wanted to be arrested "so it could be a test case." The Greenville City Council closed both the main library and the branch that black people used. The possibility of a lawsuit led to the reopening of both libraries September 19, also the day after the News printed a letter written by Wright.

In 1984, Jackson and Coretta Scott King sent letters to Florida governor Bob Graham asking him to halt the scheduled execution of James Dupree Henry, a black man convicted of killing Z. L. Riley, an Orlando based civil rights leader. Jackson met with Graham, but was unable to persuade him, and Henry was executed on September 20.

== LGBT rights activism ==
Jackson was an ardent advocate and early supporter of LGBT rights in the United States. While seeking the 1984 Democratic presidential nomination, he became the first person to mention gays and lesbians in a major-party convention speech when he included gays and lesbians as part of the fabric of American society in his speech to the 1984 Democratic National Convention, saying, "the lesbian, the gay [...] make up the American quilt" and "The rainbow includes lesbians and gays. No American citizen ought to be denied equal protection from the law". In 1987, while seeking the 1988 Democratic presidential nomination, Jackson was one of the leaders of the Second National March on Washington for Lesbian and Gay Rights.

In both of his presidential campaigns, Jackson placed LGBT rights front and center in a way no presidential candidate had done before, advocating for ending employment discrimination against gay employees and for ending the ban on openly gay service members in the military. In 1993, he spoke at the March on Washington for Lesbian, Gay, and Bi Equal Rights and Liberation, saying: "No more homophobia. Let's respect people, protect people. Everyone is somebody".

In 2004, Jackson spoke out in support of same-sex marriage in a speech in Massachusetts, which had become the first state to recognize same-sex marriage, saying, "Gays deserve the right of choice to choose their own partners". In 2010, he gave a speech to a gay rights rally in San Francisco at the United States Court of Appeals for the Ninth Circuit, which was then considering a case challenging 2008 California Proposition 8, and said:

We stand with you today to support marriage equality and to declare that Proposition 8 must be struck down as unconstitutional. People's right to self-expression, self-determination, must be respected and affirmed. It's time to challenge ignorance, a time to break the silence and the chains of hatred, of divisive and discriminatory bigotry. Marriage is based on love and commitment—not on sexual orientation. I support the right for any person to marry the person of their choosing.

If Dr. King and our civil rights movement has taught us anything, it's the fundamental principle of that all people deserve equal protection under the law. LGBT people deserve equal rights—including marriage equality—and equal protection under the law. Discrimination against one group of people is discrimination against all of us. The state—and the courts—should not sanction discrimination.

African-Americans know too well the sting of legal, state sanctioned, constitutionally driven "second-class" citizenship—from centuries of legal slavery and Jim Crow segregation, to classified as 3/5 of a human being in the U.S. Constitution, to facing anti-miscegenation laws that prevented blacks from marrying whites.

We cannot not sit idly by while Prop. 8 seeks to target gays and lesbians for a disfavored legal status, as America's newest "second-class citizens." Our legal scholars have cited fourteen times where the Supreme Court has stated that marriage is a fundamental right of all individuals. That principle must be upheld today—for blacks and whites, for straight and gay, for ALL Americans. No group of people should be denied their fundamental constitutional liberties, like equal protection under the law, simply because of who they are.

— Jesse Jackson, "Keep hope alive" speech against 2008 California Proposition 8 at the United States Court of Appeals for the Ninth Circuit in San Francisco, from Freedom to Marry (December 6, 2010)

In 2012, when President Barack Obama came out in support of same-sex marriage in the United States, Jackson supported him, saying "This is a bold step in the right direction for equal protection under the law for all citizens" and comparing the fight for equality for gays and lesbians and the fight for same-sex marriage to the fight for equality for blacks, the fight for interracial marriage, the fight against anti-miscegenation laws, the fight for the right for blacks to vote, and the fight against slavery.

== International activism ==
Jackson's influence extended to international matters in the 1980s and 1990s. In 1983, he traveled to Syria to secure the release of the captured American pilot Robert Goodman, who was being held by the Syrian government. Goodman had been shot down over Lebanon while on a mission to bomb Syrian positions there. After Jackson made a dramatic personal appeal to President Hafez al-Assad, Goodman was released. The Reagan administration was initially skeptical about Jackson's trip, but after Jackson secured Goodman's release, Reagan welcomed Jackson and Goodman to the White House on January 4, 1984. This helped boost Jackson's popularity as a patriot and served as a springboard for his 1984 presidential run. In June 1984 Jackson negotiated the release of 22 Americans being held in Cuba after an invitation by Cuban president Fidel Castro. On the eve of the 1991 Persian Gulf War, Jackson went to Iraq to plead with Saddam Hussein for the release of foreign nationals held there as "human shields", securing the release of several Britons and 20 Americans.

Jackson was an outspoken advocate for the end of South Africa's racial apartheid regime, lobbying Pope John Paul II and Soviet leader Mikhail Gorbachev against the South African government; he accompanied anti-apartheid leader (and future president) Nelson Mandela upon Mandela's release from prison. In 1997, Jackson traveled to Kenya to meet with Kenyan President Daniel arap Moi as U.S. President Bill Clinton's special envoy for democracy to promote free and fair elections. In April 1999, during the Kosovo War and the NATO bombing of Yugoslavia, he traveled to Belgrade to negotiate the release of three U.S. POWs captured on the Macedonian border while patrolling with a UN peacekeeping unit. Jackson, Serbian American congressman Rod Blagojevich, and rabbi Steven Jacobs met with then-Yugoslav president Slobodan Milošević, who later agreed to release the three men. Jackson's negotiation was not officially sanctioned by the Clinton administration and was deemed a private humanitarian mission. Despite this, Jacobs was received by the Clinton White House for his prominent role on Jackson's negotiating team.

On February 15, 2003, Jackson spoke to over an estimated one million people in Hyde Park, London, at the culmination of the demonstration against the imminent invasion of Iraq by the U.S. and the United Kingdom. In November 2004, he visited senior politicians and community activists in Northern Ireland in an effort to encourage better cross-community relations, rebuild the peace process, and restore the governmental institutions of the Belfast Agreement.

In August 2005, Jackson went to Venezuela to meet with President Hugo Chávez after controversial remarks by televangelist Pat Robertson implied that Chávez should be assassinated. Jackson condemned Robertson's remarks as immoral. After meeting with Chávez and addressing the Venezuelan Parliament, Jackson said there was no evidence that Venezuela posed a threat to the U.S. He also met representatives from the Venezuelan African and indigenous communities. In 2013, Jackson attended Chávez's funeral. He told Wolf Blitzer that "democracies mature" and incorrectly said that the first 15 U.S. presidents owned slaves (John Adams, John Quincy Adams, Millard Fillmore, Franklin Pierce, and James Buchanan did not). Jackson said the U.S. had come very far since that era. In 2005, he was enlisted as part of the United Kingdom's Operation Black Vote, a campaign Simon Woolley ran to encourage more of Britain's ethnic minorities to vote in political elections ahead of the 2005 UK general election.

In 2009, Jackson served as a speaker for the International Peace Foundation on the topic "Building a culture of peace and development in a globalized world". He visited multiple locations in Malaysia, including the Institute of Diplomacy and Foreign Relations of the Ministry of Foreign Affairs, and in Thailand, including NIST International School in Bangkok.

== Political activism ==
During the 1980s, Jackson achieved wide fame as a politician and a spokesman for civil rights issues.

=== 1984 presidential campaign ===
In May 1983, Jackson became the first African-American man since Reconstruction to address a joint session of the Alabama Legislature, where he said it was "about time we forgot about black and white and started talking about employed and unemployed". Art Harris saw Jackson as "testing the waters for a black presidential candidacy down South". In June, Jackson delivered a speech to 4,000 black Baptist ministers in Memphis bemoaning the fact that only one percent of American public officials were African-American despite blacks making up 12 percent of the population; the crowd responded with chants for him to "Run". Jackson's address to the National Congress of American Indians and touring of southern Texas to test his appeal among Hispanics fueled speculation that he would run for president.

On November 3, 1983, Jackson announced his campaign for president of the United States in the 1984 election, becoming the second African American (after Shirley Chisholm) to mount a nationwide campaign for president as a Democrat. Jackson's candidacy divided support among black politicians, and even prominent African Americans such as Coretta Scott King, who supported his right to run, refrained from endorsing him due to their belief he would not win the nomination. Among black office-holders, Jackson received the support of former Mayor of Atlanta Maynard Jackson, and Mayor of Newark Kenneth A. Gibson. Jackson entered the race after most prominent Democrats including Senator Gary Hart, and former Vice President Walter Mondale. In December, he was endorsed by National Baptist Convention, USA, Inc. chairman T. J. Jemison, and lost the endorsement of the Alabama Democratic Conference, the largest black political organization in Alabama, to Mondale.

In January, Jackson participated in the first Democratic debate in Hanover, New Hampshire. Although Jackson campaign issues coordinator Frank Watkins said the campaign did not "have to spend but a moment's time on how to utilize TV, because he understands that better than any of the other candidates and most of their media advisers", his performance was criticized for being "either wrong or uninformed". Neither Jackson or Senator Fritz Hollings campaigned prolifically in Iowa ahead of the Iowa caucuses, which Mondale won. Jackson took part in the February 24 League of Women Voters-sponsored debate, and The New York Times wrote that Jackson "provided the most dramatic exchange of the 90-minute program when Barbara Walters, the ABC News interviewer who was the moderator, asked him if he had made anti-Semitic statements, including referring to Jews as 'Hymies.'" Hart defended Jackson as having "no derogatory feelings in his soul"; Hart won the New Hampshire primary.

At the end of February, Jackson announced his supporters would file a lawsuit against state election rules that he deemed racially motivated, specifically targeting "dual registration" and "second primaries". Jackson, Mondale, and Hart took part in the March 28 debate, where Jackson interjected as Mondale and Hart argued over Central American policy. Jackson's reply, according to Howell Raines, "won him the only bursts of applause from an audience of 200 people at the Low Memorial Library who witnessed what was almost certainly the most tense of the debates." Jackson won the April 15 primary in his home state of South Carolina with 34.4 percent of the vote, receiving twice as many delegates as Mondale and Hart. At the start of May, Jackson won the District of Columbia and Louisiana primaries. More Virginia caucus-goers supported Jackson than any other candidate, but Mondale won more Virginia delegates.

Jackson received the most black support of any candidate in the Georgia, Alabama, and Florida primaries, where massive registration drives targeted at black voters led to a 69 percent increase in voter turnout from 1980 in Georgia and Alabama. A March 1984 Washington Post-ABC News poll found Jackson in third place with 20 percent support, behind Mondale and Hart with 39 and 32 percent. "By achieving unexpected success in some early primaries and caucuses, Mr. Jackson has apparently unified and raised the expectations of black voters," Raines wrote, before noting that his support was based "almost entirely on a minority vote", and pondering whether Jackson had the ability to reach white voters and whether whites were willing to vote for black candidates. The Washington Post credited Jackson with drawing "thousands of black Americans into the political process for the first time", shaking the Democratic Party's status quo, and "inspiring black pride generally by his strong showing in many primaries and his performances in candidate debates." Chairman of the D.C. Democratic State Committee Theodis Gay said that Jackson's campaign "puts blacks in particular back in touch with an identity—a feeling of self-worth and of hope." Overall, Jackson received three-quarters of the black vote in the Democratic primary. A New York Times/CBS News Poll found that black Democrats preferred Mondale to Jackson as the Democratic nominee by a margin of 5 to 3.

In May, Jackson complained that he had won 21% of the popular vote but was awarded only 9% of the delegates. He said afterward that he had been handicapped by party rules. While Mondale (in the words of his aides) was determined to establish a precedent by picking a woman or a visible minority as his vice-presidential candidate, Jackson criticized the screening process as a "p.r. parade of personalities". He mocked Mondale, saying that Hubert Humphrey was the "last significant politician out of the St. Paul–Minneapolis" area. In the June 5 primaries, Jackson ran third behind Mondale and Hart in each state, and Mondale's victories left him with enough delegates to be considered the presumptive nominee. Mondale signaled his desire to telephone both Hart and Jackson for party unity. In an address to supporters at the Operation PUSH headquarters, Jackson said that fairness had not been achieved and that he was entitled to help choose both Mondale's running mate and his cabinet in the event he defeated Reagan in November. On July 4, Jackson and Mondale met at the Radisson Muehlebach Hotel for more than two hours. Mondale called the meeting "successful", while Jackson said it was "not complete because there are unresolved matters", though he said that he expected to support Mondale if he was the nominee. Mondale ruled out Jackson as a running mate, citing "sufficient differences between Reverend Jackson and myself".

Jackson addressed the 1984 Democratic National Convention in San Francisco on July 17, 1984, where he delivered his famous "Rainbow Coalition" speech. It was the first speech at a national convention to mention gays and lesbians. Jackson said,

America is not like a blanket—one piece of unbroken cloth, the same color, the same texture, the same size. America is more like a quilt: many patches, many pieces, many colors, many sizes, all woven and held together by a common thread. The white, the Hispanic, the black, the Arab, the Jew, the woman, the native American, the small farmer, the businessperson, the environmentalist, the peace activist, the young, the old, the lesbian, the gay, and the disabled make up the American quilt.

It also featured an apology alluding to comments he made which were considered derogatory to Jews and "answered the longstanding question of his loyalty to the party in the general election". He added: "Even in our fractured state, all of us count and all of us fit somewhere. We have proven that we can survive without each other. But we have not proven that we can win and progress without each other. We must come together."

During the convention, Jackson's proposals to ban runoff primaries, decrease defense spending, and pledge the U.S. would not use nuclear weapons first were voted down from the party platform. In spite of this, Jackson reiterated his support for the Democrats, saying that while they could afford to lose the vote, they could not afford to "avoid raising the right questions. Our self-respect and our moral integrity were at stake. Our heads are perhaps bloody, but unbowed. Our back is straight and our vision is clear." On August 29, Jackson met with Mondale again and afterward declared that he had "embraced the mission and support the Mondale-Ferraro candidacy with great fervor" but also that he would "always reserve the right to challenge" Mondale. By September, Jackson had introduced Mondale to the National Baptist Convention and the Congressional Black Caucus, and had gone from a political liability to "mostly a plus for the Democratic ticket, with few minuses". Reagan defeated Mondale in a landslide in the general election, and Thomas Cavanagh of the Joint Center for Political Studies noted that all black challengers lost their elections despite expectations that Jackson's presidential candidacy would increase turnout in their favor.

=== Activity between presidential campaigns ===
In January 1985, concurrent with the second inauguration of Ronald Reagan, Jackson led several hundred supporters in a procession through downtown Washington to the grounds of the Washington Monument. He stressed that they needed to "keep alive the hopes of those who have fallen through the safety net" and challenge America "to protect the poor". In April, Jackson led a rally to protest the sale of an elderly farmer's form to Kearney Trust Co. outside the Clinton County Courthouse, where he called the gathering of farmers, union labor members, ministers, and urban blacks from Kansas City "a rainbow coalition for economic justice". In June, Mayor of the District of Columbia Marion Barry introduced Jackson at the Winston Elementary School, where Jackson said that the "number one threat to the development of this generation is drugs".

In June 1986, Jackson delivered a commencement speech at Medgar Evers College in which he bemoaned that many young people were "experiencing an ethical collapse, a spiritual withdrawal, and escaping this reality through drugs, alcohol, sex without love, making unwanted babies and turning on each other with violence". Later that month, after basketball player Len Bias died from cardiac arrest stemming from "cocaine intoxication", Jackson and Representative Charles Rangel called for Reagan to announce a nationwide war on drugs and seek increased funding of federal anti-drug education programs in public schools.

During the 1987 Chicago mayoral election, Jackson led an effort to get Chairman Paul G. Kirk to meet with the Cook County party leaders in Chicago to prevent the campaign's deterioration and avoid "dissension and splintering of the Democratic vote". Jackson and his supporters charged that Chicago Democrats would do anything to prevent Harold Washington from being reelected, including campaigning for his Republican challenger.

=== 1988 presidential campaign ===
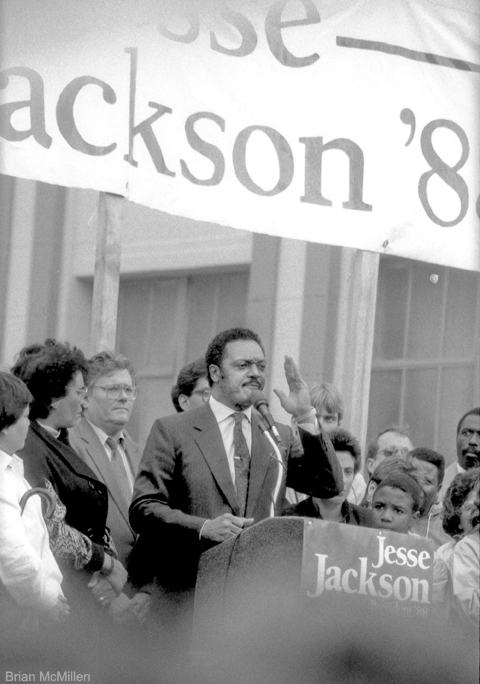
Jackson campaigning in San Francisco, 1988

By early 1986, there was speculation that Jackson would run for president again in 1988. In March 1987, he formed an exploratory committee, making him the second potential candidate to do so, after Gary Hart. By April 1987, after previously having spent "all of half a day" in Iowa, Jackson had spent six days there throughout the year and moved his office to the rural part of the state instead of Des Moines. He stressed that farmers and businessmen were akin to unemployed blacks in being negatively affected by the Reagan administration's economic policies. In July, Jackson met with former Governor of Alabama George Wallace for half an hour, calling the former segregationist "one of the most forward of any governor across the South in terms of the sharing of appointments with blacks and whites and women, and the tone of the administration had changed". The meeting was seen as Jackson testing support for a presidential bid. In September, Jackson attended a presidential candidates forum; he embraced the Congressional Black Caucus's positions on education, employment, and defense, and was greeted with chants of "Run Jesse Run" and "Win Jesse Win".

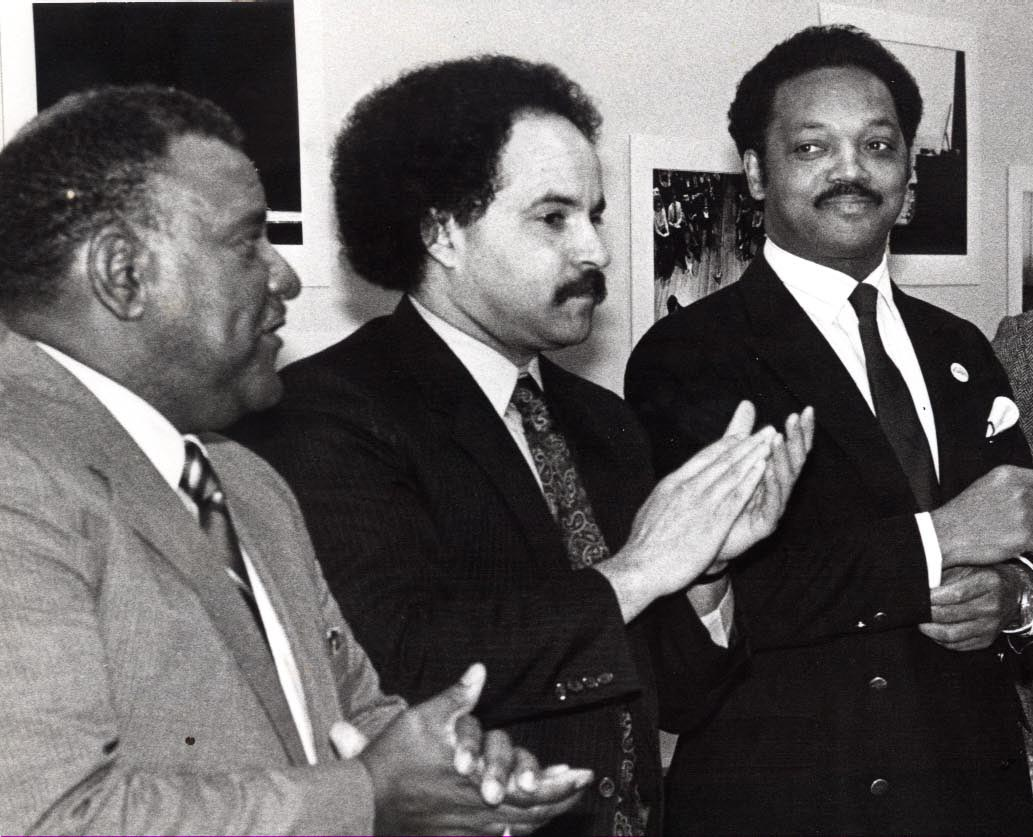
Jackson (right) with Curt Anderson (center) and Decatur "Bucky" Trotter (left) during a Maryland Legislative Black Caucus meeting in Annapolis, Maryland (1988)

On October 11, 1987, Jackson announced his candidacy in the 1988 presidential election. At the time of his announcement, polling showed that he led in nine of the 12 Southern states that would hold primaries or caucuses in March and led the Democratic field at 27 percent. In November, Jackson announced that Speaker of the California State Assembly Willie Brown would serve as his campaign chairman while political strategist Gerald Austin became his campaign manager. Later that month, Jackson announced he would stop his tour of the Persian Gulf to attend the funeral of his friend, Mayor of Chicago Harold Washington, before changing his mind.

Jackson's campaign platform included a call for a single-payer system of universal health care; higher taxes on the wealthy and defense spending cuts intended to reduce federal budget deficits and increase education, housing, welfare, and childcare spending; ratifying the Equal Rights Amendment; an executive order to ban discrimination against gays and lesbians in federal agencies, the army, and to recognize gay couples for spousal benefits; reducing the supply and flow of drugs into communities; the creation of a domestic version of the World Bank called the "American Investment Bank" that would have the authority to sell government bonds to rebuild American infrastructure; suspending the development of new nuclear weapons in order to eventually ban them altogether; and "a very different relationship with the Soviet Union" involving a constructive partnership. In 1987, The New York Times called Jackson "a classic liberal in the tradition of the New Deal and the Great Society".

Jackson participated in the January 24 University of New Hampshire debate, where he was noted as the "one candidate who stayed away from most of the bitter exchanges" as he assailed the Reagan administration. In the February 8 Iowa caucus, Jackson came in fourth place behind Richard Gephardt, Paul Simon, and Michael Dukakis, though he had quadrupled his support there from his 1984 bid. After losing in New Hampshire to Dukakis by a wide margin, Jackson was seen as having done "well enough to argue that he has expanded his appeal to white voters." In the March 8 Super Tuesday contests, Jackson won Virginia, Georgia, Louisiana, Mississippi, and Alabama. Party leaders saw the results as indicating the beginning of a long three-way race between Dukakis, Jackson, and Al Gore. As the month progressed, Jackson won Alaska, South Carolina, and Puerto Rico.

Jackson scored a surprising victory in the March 26 Michigan primary, defeating Dukakis in a landslide. This made him the front-runner in the race and spurred party officials to actively contemplate that he could be the party's nominee after all. Former Democratic Party chairman Robert S. Strauss said that his Michigan win showed that Jackson "has a kind of power we hadn't expected" and was "a real vulnerability" for Dukakis's campaign. Jackson participated in the March 28 debate at Fordham University, where he was the only candidate greeted by applause, and stressed that government intervention could end homelessness. Mayor of New York City Ed Koch supported Gore and attacked Jackson, saying that Jews "would have to be crazy" to support his campaign and that Jackson lied about his role in the aftermath of King's assassination. Dukakis defeated Jackson in the New York primary, and a distant third-place finish led Gore to drop out of the race. Koch later apologized in a letter, expressing regret "if racial or religious friction resulted" from his comments about Jackson. Jackson narrowly lost the Colorado primary to Dukakis, and was defeated handily by him in the Wisconsin primary the next day. Jackson's showing among Wisconsin's white voters was significantly better than in 1984 but also noticeably lower than pre-primary polling had predicted. The back-to-back victories established Dukakis as the front-runner. Jackson and Dukakis debated each other one-on-one for the first time on April 23. Throughout May, Dukakis won more contests, and Jackson's own staff admitted he no longer could win the nomination.

By the end of the Democratic primaries, Jackson had received 6.9 million votes and won 11 contests: seven primaries (Alabama, the District of Columbia, Georgia, Louisiana, Mississippi, Puerto Rico, and Virginia) and four caucuses (Delaware, Michigan, South Carolina, and Vermont). The day after the last primaries, Jackson met with Dukakis and they discussed some of Jackson's platform, such as a universal same-day, on-site voter registration and changing the rules for the winner-take-all delegate allocation. Jackson felt he deserved Dukakis's consideration as a running mate. Dukakis agreed, but added that Jackson was of no "special or greater consideration" simply because he finished second in the primaries. Polling in April found a Dukakis–Jackson ticket would defeat Vice President George H. W. Bush, but that either alone would lose to Bush. Dukakis picked Senator Lloyd Bentsen as his running mate, and Jackson responded that Dukakis had the right to use an approach "making a strategic move to solidify his organization" and that his strategy was to "keep hope alive, to keep focus in our campaign, to keep our delegates and supporters, disciplined detail and full of hope, to put forth the very best expression we can of support on Wednesday, July 20, at nomination time." The dispute between Jackson and Dukakis led Jackson to suggest former President Jimmy Carter would have to mediate their conflict, and they did not reach an agreement until shortly before the 1988 Democratic National Convention began. After Dukakis was nominated, Jackson appeared with Bentsen and Dukakis at a loyalty breakfast where Dukakis told Jackson's supporters that he needed them. By September, former members of Jackson's campaign became involved in a dispute with the Dukakis campaign and the Michigan Democratic Party to "obtain additional jobs, power and money".

According to a November 1987 New York Times article, "Most political analysts give him little chance of being nominated—partly because he is black, partly because of his unretrenched liberalism." Jackson's campaign was also interrupted by allegations about his half-brother Noah Robinson Jr.'s criminal activity. Robinson claimed in an interview that the arrest was an attempt to make him "the Billy Carter of the Jackson campaign". But Jackson's past successes made him a more credible candidate, and he was both better financed and better organized than in 1984. The Washington Post wrote that while Jackson's support "continued to flow predominantly from black districts", his support among white voters allowed him to "claim that he is more than a one-race candidate. Perhaps more to the point, no other candidate was able to generate anything like the total support that Mr. Jackson did." Jackson once again exceeded expectations as he more than doubled his previous results, prompting R. W. Apple of The New York Times to call 1988 "the Year of Jackson".

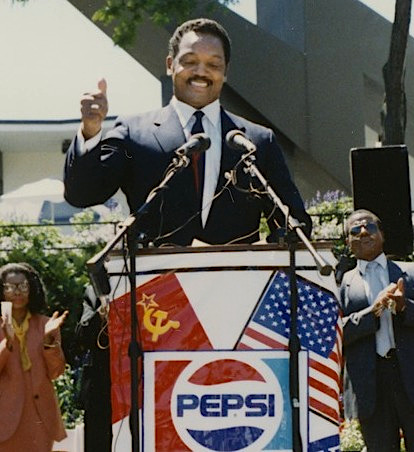
Jackson speaking at the Goodwill Games in Seattle, 1990

=== Stance on abortion ===
Although Jackson was one of the most liberal members of the Democratic Party, his position on abortion was originally more in line with pro-life views. Less than a month after the 1973 U.S. Supreme Court decision Roe v. Wade legalized abortion, Jackson began a PUSH campaign against the decision, calling abortion murder and declaring that Jesus and Moses might not have been born if abortion had been available in ancient times. Jackson's strong rhetoric on abortion temporarily alienated one of his major supporters, T. R. M. Howard, a Black physician who performed the procedure.

In 1975, Jackson endorsed a plan for a constitutional amendment banning abortion. He also endorsed the Hyde Amendment, which bars the funding of abortions through the federal Medicaid program. In a 1977 National Right to Life Committee News report, Jackson argued that the basis for Roe v. Wade—the right to privacy—had also been used to justify slavery and the treatment of slaves on the plantations. Jackson decried what he believed was the casual taking of life and the decline in society's values. He later changed his views, saying that women have the right to an abortion and that the government should not interfere. In 1988, a pro-life opinion writer in The Washington Post wrote: "He [Jackson] supports federal funding of abortion and says moral positions shouldn't be imposed on public policy. Freedom of choice must prevail. He echoes the arguments that make Democrats the party of abortion."

After the leak of the draft decision to overturn Roe v. Wade, Jackson compared the draft to Dred Scott v. Sandford, as both were "preceded by a disingenuous campaign to urge citizens to respect the decisions of the court as grounded in law, not politics". He predicted overturning Roe v. Wade would "spark fierce political battles over basic rights in the states, the Congress, the courts and on the streets". In June 2022, the Supreme Court overruled Roe in Dobbs v. Jackson.

=== Later political activities ===
==== 1990s ====
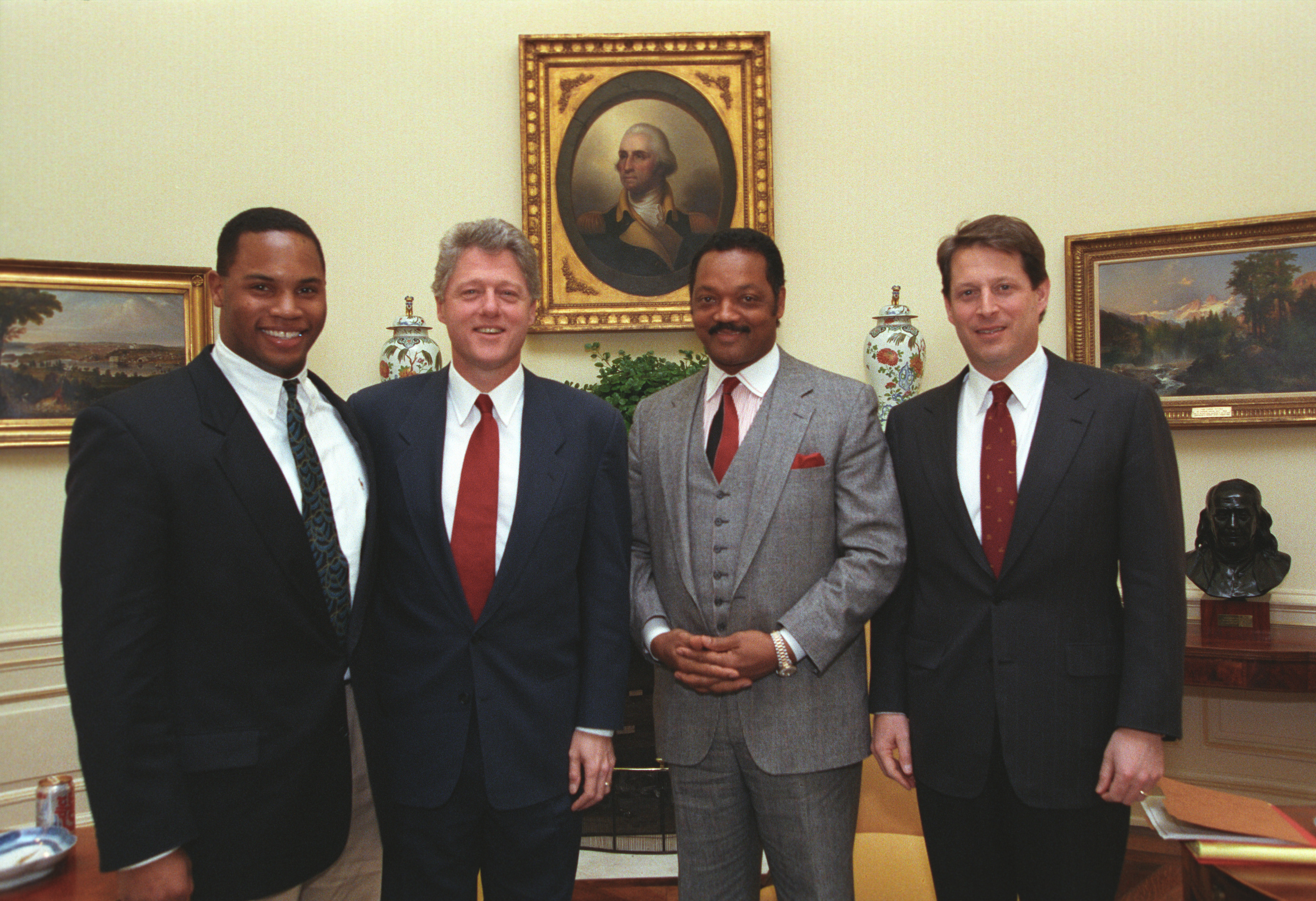
Jackson with President Bill Clinton, Vice President Al Gore and son Yusef Jackson, 1993

After District of Columbia Mayor Marion Barry was arrested, Jackson was under pressure to enter the mayoral race to replace Barry. While Jackson said he was not running for the position, he also said, "that public servants should never say never, and they should never say forever." Jackson talked about running with his 1988 presidential campaign chairman, Joel Ferguson, and Ferguson formally announced Jackson's decision not to enter the race the next day. Jackson instead ran for office as "shadow senator" for the District of Columbia when the position was created in 1991, serving until 1997, when he did not run for reelection. This unpaid position was primarily a lobbying post for statehood for the District of Columbia.

In 1990, Jackson attended a dinner honoring the 20th anniversary of The Joint Center for Political and Economic Studies, where George H. W. Bush spoke of the day an African-American would one day be president and teased Jackson by invoking him when mentioning his visit with children in ghettos: "Jesse. I'm talking about little kids. I'm not talking about 49-year-old guys. Let's not rush it."

In November 1991, Democratic National Committee chair Ron Brown reported that Jackson had told him that he would not enter the 1992 Democratic Party presidential primaries. A short time later, Jackson formally declared he would not mount a third presidential bid and called for the creation of a "new democratic majority". His decision not to run caused concerns for the future of the Rainbow Coalition, which The New York Times wrote "has only carried political clout in the years when Mr. Jackson has run for President."

During the 1992 primaries in New York and Wisconsin, Jerry Brown, who had taken the lead in polls in both states, announced to an audience of various leaders of New York City's Jewish community that, if nominated, he would consider Jackson as his running mate. Brown's polling numbers suffered. On April 7, he lost narrowly to Bill Clinton in Wisconsin (37%–34%), and dramatically in New York (41%–26%).

Governor of Arkansas Bill Clinton insulted Jackson on an open television microphone and called on Jackson to apologize. Jackson said that focusing on the comments was unhelpful and noted that Clinton was the only one of the then-five Democratic presidential candidates who had not agreed to join Jackson on campaign trips highlighting housing, health, and education issues. On April 26, 1992, Jackson and Clinton had a 40-minute meeting in Clinton's hotel suite and emerged to announce that they were both committed to defeating Bush in the general election. Asked if he was ready to endorse Clinton, Jackson said: "Well, if he wins the nomination of our party, he would be well on his way. We need a new President and we need a new direction. We cannot afford any more of what George Bush represents." After Clinton became the likely nominee, Jackson appealed to the Democratic Party's platform committee to neither "go with the flow on capital punishment" nor "walk soft on right-to-work laws". Although Jackson promised to endorse the party's nominee, his comments were seen as directed at Clinton. David S. Broder noted Jackson's lessened influence at the 1992 Democratic National Convention and contrasted him with Chairman Brown: "At almost the same moment that Jackson learned he could no longer hold the Democratic Party and its nominee hostage to his demands, Brown was showing he could carry the party and its convention in his hands." In January 1992, Jackson began hosting a CNN talk show, Both Sides with Jesse Jackson. The program featured guests representing opposite sides of a single issue and was among the few CNN programs hosted by a liberal.

In February 2026, it was revealed that Jackson and Clinton had been friends since they first met in Little Rock, Arkansas, during the 20th-anniversary celebration of the integration of Little Rock Central High School in 1977.

Jackson was initially critical of Clinton's moderate "Third Way" policies. Peter Beinart alleged that Clinton was "petrified about a primary challenge from Jackson in the 1996 U.S. presidential election. But Jackson became a key ally in gaining African-American support for Clinton and eventually became a close adviser and friend of the Clinton family. His son Jesse Jackson Jr. was elected to the U.S. House of Representatives from Illinois. In the mid-1990s, Jackson was approached about being the United States Ambassador to South Africa but declined the opportunity in favor of helping his son run for the House. However, in October 1997 he accepted an offer from Clinton and Secretary of State Madeleine Albright to serve as "Special Envoy of the President and Secretary of State for the Promotion of Democracy in Africa".

On August 29, 1993, Jackson joined gatherers at the Lincoln Memorial to commemorate the 30th anniversary of the March on Washington for Jobs and Freedom, walking arm-in-arm with United States Secretary of Housing and Urban Development Henry Cisneros and United States Attorney General Janet Reno. In September 1996, Jackson visited rapper Tupac Shakur in the hospital after he was wounded in a drive-by shooting. Jackson said the real issue was "the violent culture we live in—the survival of the fittest that too often calls for revenge". SFGATE criticized his remark as "off the mark" in characterizing Shakur as a victim of a violent society.

Jackson backed Al Sharpton in the 1997 New York City mayoral election, denouncing Alan Hevesi for refusing to support Sharpton in the event that he won the primary, calling it "the worst conceivable time for polarizing statements and positions by responsible leaders". Sharpton lost the Democratic primary to Ruth Messinger, who lost the general election to incumbent Rudy Giuliani. In March 2000, Jackson criticized Giuliani's handling of the Patrick Dorismond shooting, saying there was "something that is not well about his response to unarmed people being shot by police." Mayoral spokesman Curt Ritter responded: "Jesse Jackson, Dov Hikind and Alan Hevesi have joined the political pile-on team being captained by Al Sharpton in the name of Hillary Clinton."

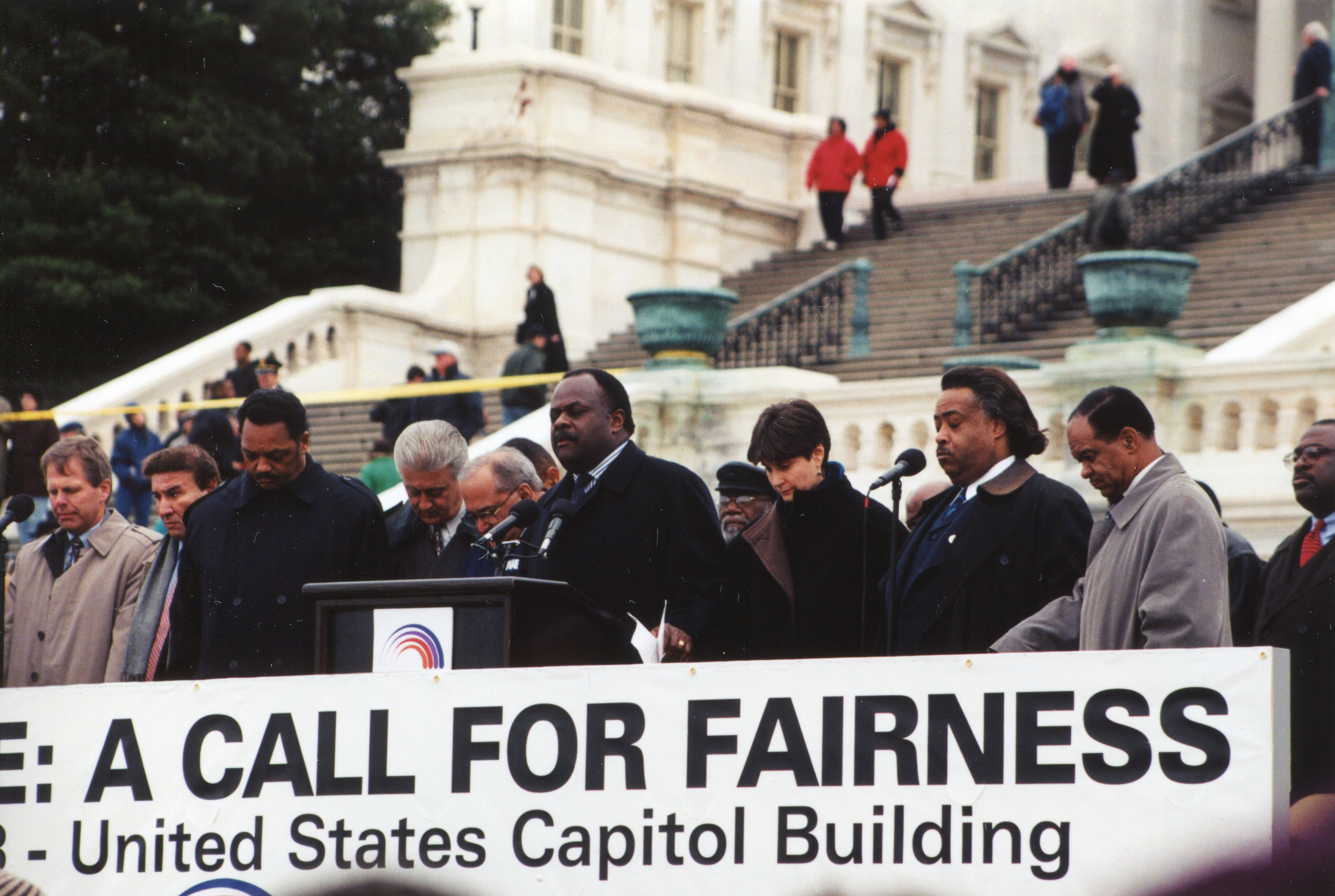
Jackson (third from left) and Al Sharpton (third from right) at anti-impeachment rally at the US Capitol in support of President Bill Clinton (fourth from left), December 17, 1998

In 1998, Clinton's affair with White House intern Monica Lewinsky became public, and his lying under oath about the affair led to an impeachment inquiry by the House. In an interview with The Washington Post, Jackson explained his opposition to Clinton's removal from office: "The punishment of impeachment does not correspond to the nature of Mr. Clinton's lack of candor. What he did does not fit the definition of high crimes; it was a little crime." On December 17, Jackson led a prayer vigil outside the U.S. Capitol to increase the visibility of those opposed to Clinton's impeachment. The House impeached Clinton the following day.

On November 18, 1999, seven Decatur, Illinois high school students were expelled for two years after participating in a brawl at a football game. The incident was caught on home video and became a national media event when CNN ran pictures of the fight. After the students were expelled, Jackson argued that the expulsions were unfair and racially biased, and called on the school board to reverse its decision.

==== 2000s ====
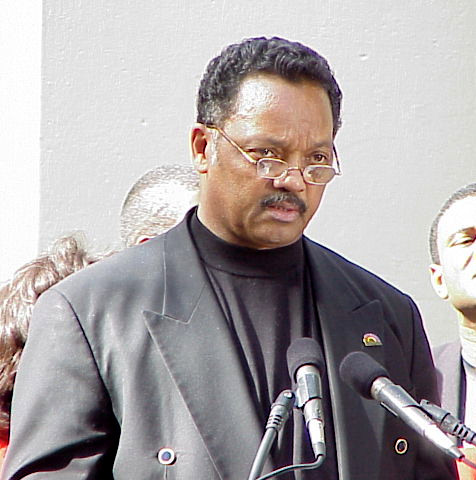
Jackson outside the Florida Supreme Court, 2000

In March 1999, Jackson announced he would not be a candidate in the 2000 U.S. presidential election, saying that he intended to continue championing the causes of education and health care reform and highlighting the "ongoing shame of our nation—the explosive growth of the prison-industrial complex." In August, Jackson criticized Republican Governor of Texas and presidential candidate George W. Bush as showing no leadership after the murder of James Byrd Jr. by not pushing any hate-crime bills. On March 1, 2000, Jackson endorsed Vice President Al Gore, saying that he brought "to the table a body of invaluable accomplishments as a former congressman, senator and vice president." Gore won the nomination, and Jackson addressed the 2000 Democratic National Convention.

Gore faced Bush in the general election, where the close race in Florida led to the Florida election recount. On November 10, Jackson attended a rally in West Palm Beach and called for the Justice Department to investigate the "widespread disgrace across this state", noting Palm Beach County had confusing and illegal ballots that failed to adhere to state laws mandating that voters make their choice to the right of the candidate's name. On December 5, Jackson joined Florida Black Caucus members in filing a civil rights suit charging that minority voters in Duval County were discarded at higher rates than those of whites. Jackson noted 27,000 votes from Duval County were not counted on election night and most of them came from black inner-city neighborhoods. Gore conceded the election weeks later.

On January 20, 2001, Bill Clinton's final day in office, Clinton pardoned Congressman Mel Reynolds, John Bustamante, and Dorothy Rivers; Jackson had requested pardons for them. Jackson had also requested a pardon for his half-brother Noah Robinson who had been convicted of murdering Leroy Barber and sentenced to life imprisonment, but Clinton did not pardon Robinson on the grounds that Robinson had already submitted three pardon appeals, all of which the Justice Department had denied.

The 2000 recount was not the last time Jackson clashed with Governor of Florida Jeb Bush. After Bush nominated Jerry Regier for the Department of Children and Families in 2002, Jackson joined Democrats who criticized a 1989 paper, which listed Reiger as co-chairman of the authoring group, that endorsed spanking to the point of bruises and welts and opposed married women having careers. Jackson said: "In some sense, Mr. Regier is an extension of Mr. Bush's ideology. These are his convictions and that's why he's going to stand by him." In June 2004, Jackson rebuked Bush for requesting counties purge felons from voting rolls, calling it "a typical South (tactic), denying the right to vote based on race and class." Bush called Jackson's comments "outrageous" and said the civil rights leader was "past his prime." In early 2005 Jackson visited Terri Schiavo's parents and supported their unsuccessful bid to keep her alive, which Bush also supported, one of the few times Jackson and Bush backed the same cause.

After the September 11 attacks, and in the lead-up to the United States invasion of Afghanistan, Jackson said on September 26 that he had been invited by the Taliban to lead a "peace delegation" to the country; he had previously undertaken several such independent missions to negotiate the release of overseas American hostages. Jackson said he was reluctant, but that he was carefully considering the visit, saying, "If we can do something to encourage them to dismantle those terrorist bases, to choose to hand over the suspects and release the Christians rather than engage in a long bloody war, we'll encourage them to do so." The father of one of eight Christian missionaries held in Kabul on charges of proselytizing had made an appeal to Jackson that Jackson called "compelling". There was later some confusion as to where the offer of mediation had come from; the Taliban ambassador to Pakistan was quoted as saying, "We have not invited him [Jackson], but he has made an offer to mediate which has been accepted by our leader, Mullah Mohammad Omar." The White House advised against the visit, reiterating its commitment not to negotiate with the Taliban. Ultimately, Jackson rejected the offer, citing the lack of progress made by a Pakistani delegation, calling the Afghan response "a mistake on their part and strangely suspicious."

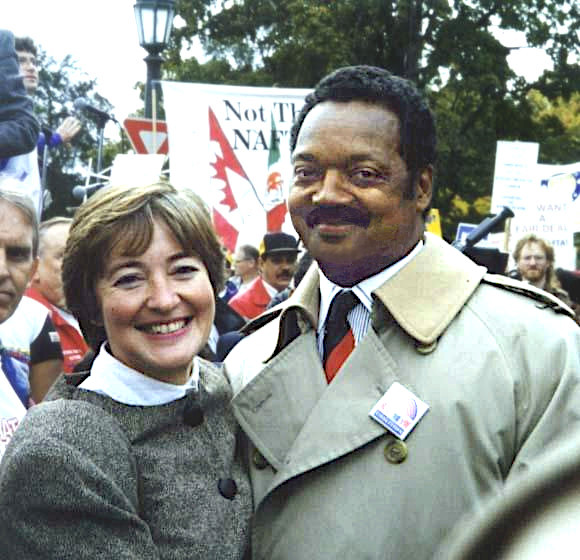
Jackson with Canadian water rights environmental activist Maude Barlow, 2005

In a 2002 interview, Jackson said there was "a new America" and the world was abandoning the Jeffersonian democracy that coexisted with slavery in favor of "King democracy", named for his former mentor who "fundamentally changed democracy." In November, African Americans Against Exploitation Inc., which included Jesse Lee Peterson as a plaintiff, filed suit against Jackson alleging that he "intentionally misrepresented himself as an official of the African American race." Jackson responded that it was "a nuisance lawsuit with no basis in law or fact." That year, Jackson was a target of a white supremacist terror plot.

On September 1, 2003, Jackson was among those arrested for blocking traffic at Yale University as they showed their solidarity with striking clerical, dining hall and maintenance workers. He was the first person handcuffed. On June 23, 2007, Jackson was arrested in connection with a protest at a gun store in Riverdale, a low-income suburb of Chicago. He and others were protesting due to allegations that the gun store had been selling firearms to local gang members and was contributing to the decay of the community. According to police reports, Jackson refused to stop blocking the front entrance of the store and let customers pass. He was charged with one count of criminal trespassing.

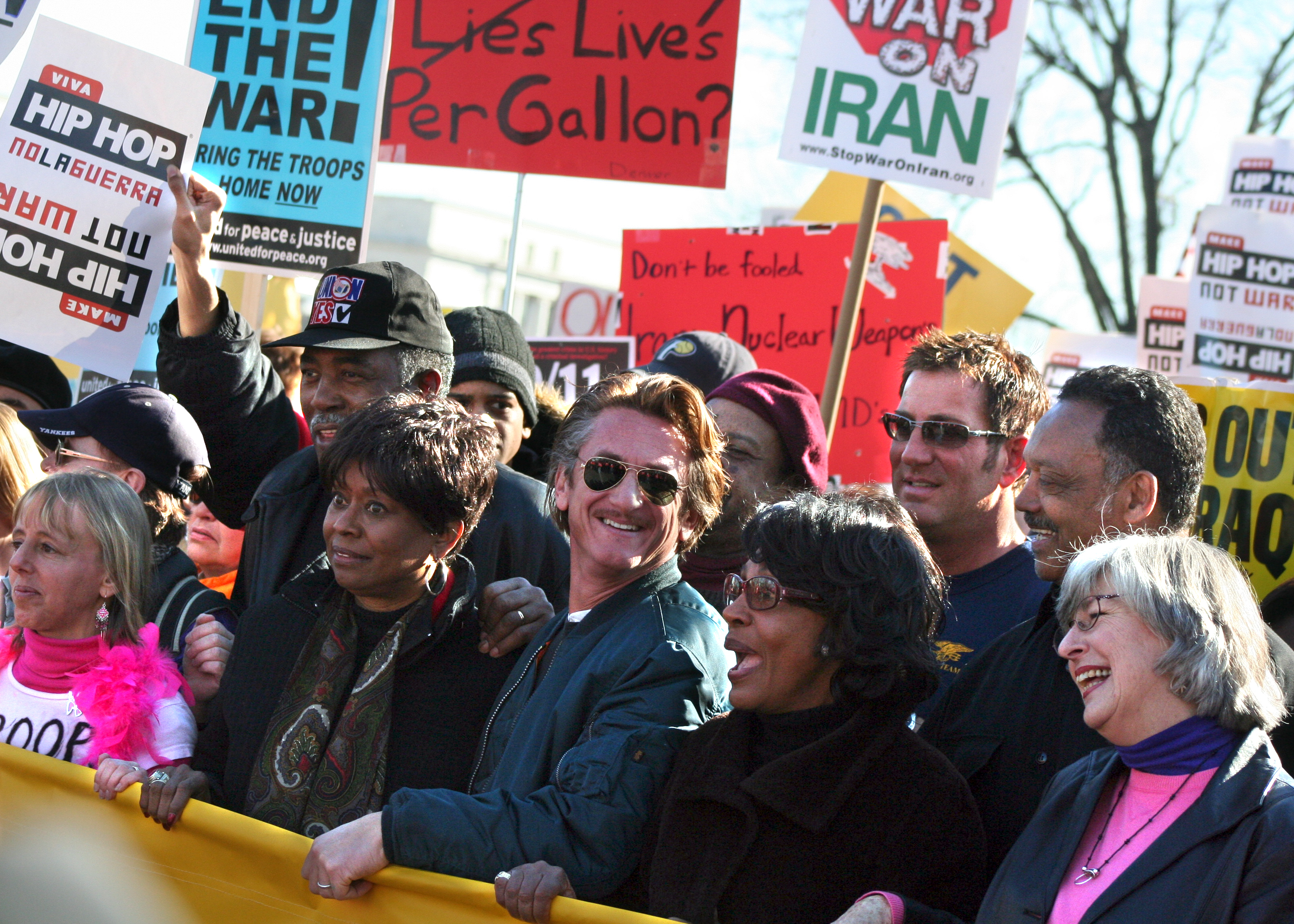
Jackson at an anti-war rally in 2007 with Sean Penn

In February 2004, Jackson delivered an address at the John F. Kennedy School of Government, where he called for southern voters to turn away from the fears and despair that led to their support of Bush in 2000. Jackson also said the wartime credentials of John Kerry, the front-runner for the Democratic presidential nomination, would make him a formidable opponent for Bush and urged those feeling powerless to get involved. Jackson addressed the 2004 Democratic National Convention. In the general election, Jackson traveled with Kerry, and stumped for him in battleground states. Kerry lost to Bush. In 2005, the Federal Election Commission ruled that Jackson and the Democratic National Committee had violated electoral law in 2000 and fined them $200,000 (equivalent to $316,400 in 2025). In March 2006 an African-American woman accused three white members of the Duke University men's lacrosse team of raping her. During the ensuing controversy, Jackson stated that his Rainbow/PUSH Coalition would pay for the rest of her college tuition regardless of the outcome of the case. The case against the three men was later thrown out, and the players were declared innocent by the North Carolina Attorney General.

Jackson took a key role in the scandal caused by comedian Michael Richards's onstage racist tirade at the Laugh Factory in November 2006. Richards called Jackson a few days after the incident to apologize; Jackson accepted Richards' apology and met with him publicly as a means of resolving the situation. Jackson also joined Black leaders in a call for the elimination of the "N-word" throughout the entertainment industry.

In March 2007, Jackson declared his support for then-Senator Barack Obama in the 2008 Democratic Party presidential primaries. He later criticized Obama in 2007 for "acting like he's white" in response to the Jena 6 beating case. On July 6, 2008, during an interview with Fox News, a microphone picked up Jackson whispering to fellow guest Reed Tuckson: "See, Barack's been, ahh, talking down to black people on this faith-based... I want to cut his nuts off." Jackson was expressing his disappointment in Obama's Father's Day speech chastising absent Black fathers. Subsequent to an interview with Fox News, Jackson apologized and reiterated his support for Obama. On November 4, Jackson attended the Obama victory rally in Chicago's Grant Park. In the moments before Obama spoke, Jackson was seen in tears.

In November 2009, the Congressional Black Caucus honored Jackson for the 25th anniversary of his 1984 presidential campaign. Of Obama's health care reform proposal, Jackson said: "We even have blacks voting against the health care bill. You can't vote against health care and call yourself a black man." His comments were interpreted as a dig at Representative Artur Davis, the only member of the caucus to vote against the proposal, and political observers said that Jackson's criticism could benefit Davis, who was then a candidate in the 2010 Alabama gubernatorial election and positioning himself as a moderate Democrat. Davis lost the Democratic primary to Ron Sparks.

==== Early 2010s ====
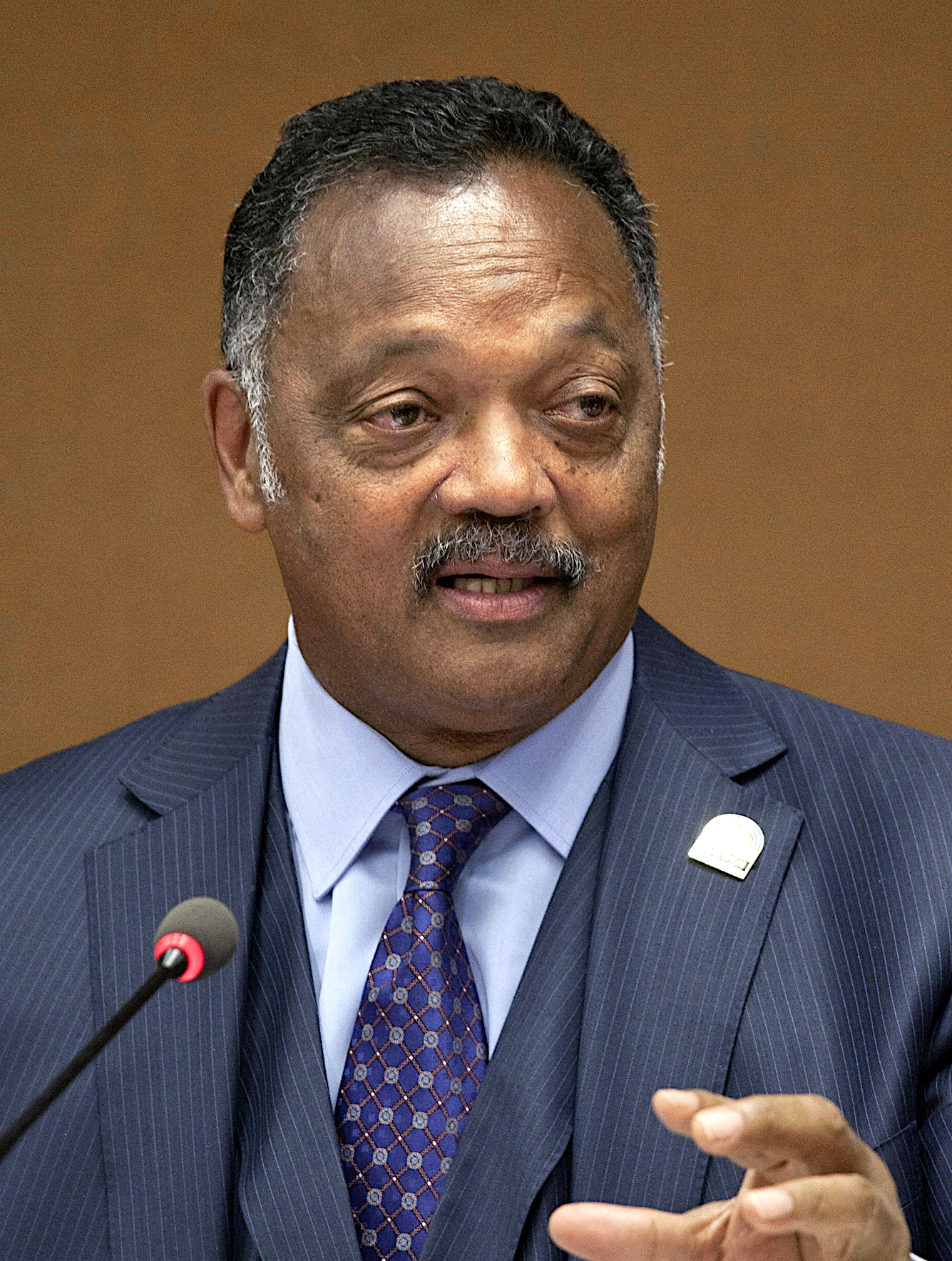
Jackson at the United Nations, March 2012

In August 2010, Jackson participated in the "Jobs, Justice and Peace" march in Detroit, which he said was held to show Obama and other leaders that Detroit needed a focused urban policy. Shannon Jones of World Socialist Web Site criticized the march as "little more than a campaign rally for the Democratic Party, which has overseen wholesale job and wage cuts in Detroit and nationally while escalating military violence around the world" and in actuality "a demonstration in support of the American ruling class drive, spearheaded by the Obama administration, to put in place a permanent lowering of wages and living conditions in the US."

In 2011, Wayne Barrett wrote that Obama's embrace of Sharpton had "as much to do with the president's antipathy for three other black leaders—Jesse Jackson, Dr. Cornel West and Tavis Smiley—as it does with any genuine White House enthusiasm for the controversial New York preacher." In 2012, Jackson commended Obama's 2012 decision to support gay marriage and compared the fight for marriage equality to the fight against slavery and the anti-miscegenation laws that once prevented interracial marriage. He favored federal legislation extending marriage rights to gay people.

After the shooting of Trayvon Martin in February 2012, Jackson joined Martin's parents as they demanded the arrest of his killer, George Zimmerman, and called for repealing stand-your-ground laws to discourage "vigilante" behavior. Zimmerman was arrested, and later acquitted of second-degree murder. Jackson responded to the acquittal by refusing to accept it, comparing it to the acquittals in the cases of Emmett Till and Medgar Evers. He called for protesters to do nothing that "would diminish the moral authority of Trayvon Martin as a martyr in this case" and for the Justice Department to file civil rights charges against Zimmerman. The Department of Justice concluded that there was not sufficient evidence of Zimmerman violating Martin's civil rights.

In July 2013, Jackson met with Marissa Alexander and called for Angela Corey to use her influence to get Alexander's 20-year sentence reduced. He contrasted Alexander's sentence with Zimmerman's acquittal: "A woman was not guilty of shooting or killing anyone is in jail for 20 years. A man who did kill someone is walking free. The gap is too great." In January 2015, Alexander was released from a jail in Jacksonville, Florida under a plea deal changing her sentence to three years which she had already served.

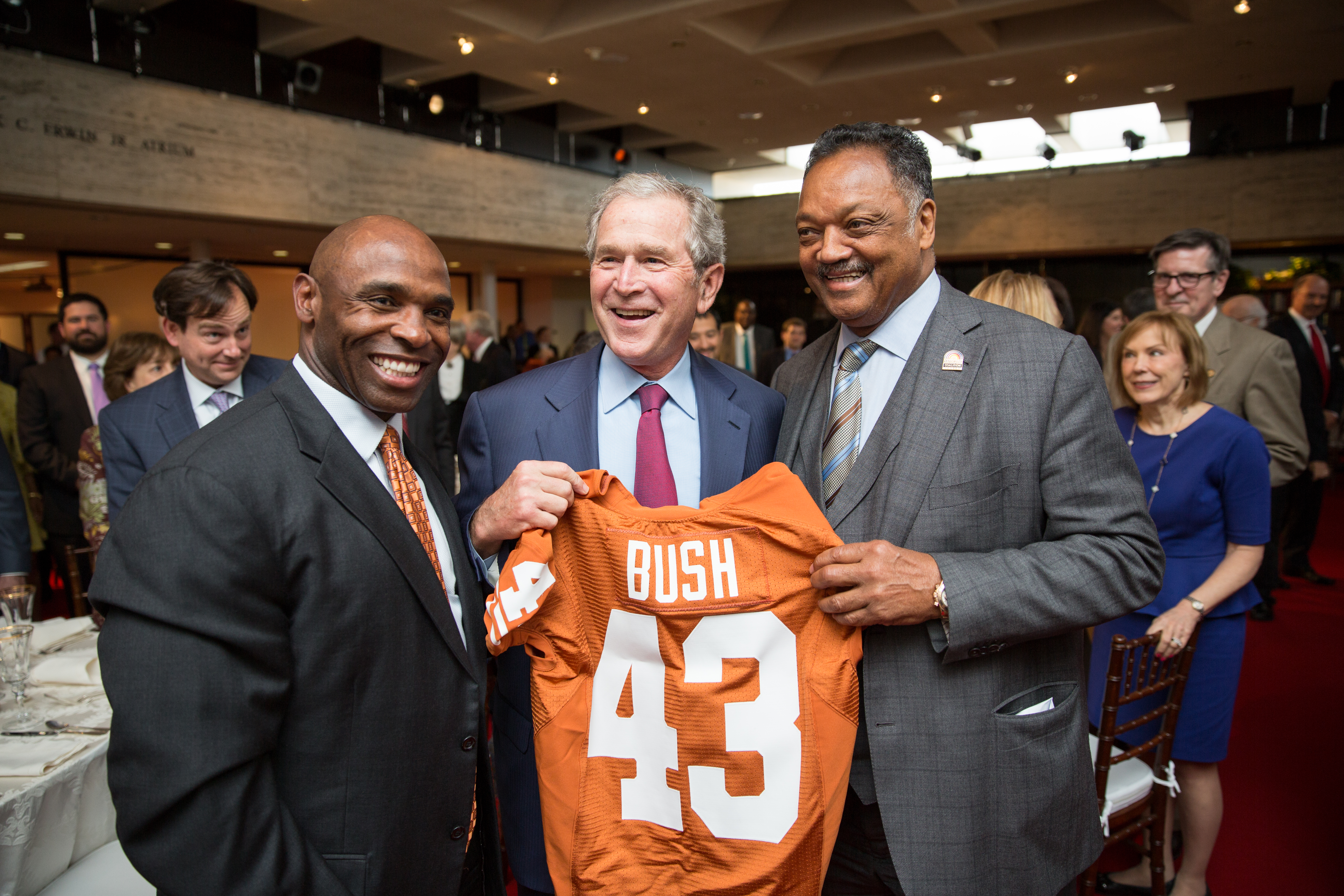
Jackson with Charlie Strong and George W. Bush, April 2014

The shooting of Michael Brown ignited unrest in Ferguson, Missouri. Jackson wrote an op-ed addressing Ferguson in which he declared that "there has been no significant urban, suburban, small town or rural policy to rebuild America" since Lyndon B. Johnson and that urban and rural communities "have significantly deteriorated during the past 46 years of neglect." In an MSNBC interview, Jackson likened the shooting to a state execution and requested that the White House create a policy to address ills in black urban communities. He marched to the site of Brown's shooting with other protesters and led them in prayer, warning them that they could "reshape an iron while it's hot, but don't destroy yourself in the process." After Robert McCulloch chose to not indict Brown's shooter, Darren Wilson, Jackson requested the involvement of a federal grand jury in the case.

In January 2015, Jackson participated in a panel discussion at Stanford University, calling for East Palo Alto residents to combat gentrification even if it meant marching to a company's headquarters. He met with Silicon Valley leaders. In June, after Dylann Roof killed nine people at the Emanuel African Methodist Episcopal Church in downtown Charleston, South Carolina, Jackson and Sharpton joined Governor Nikki Haley, U.S. Senator Tim Scott, and Mayor of Charleston Joseph P. Riley Jr. in attending funerals of the victims. In an op-ed, Jackson said the shooting was "the result of institutionalized racism, centuries of dehumanization and the current denial of economic and political equality of opportunity", and urged Obama, Congress, governors, and state legislatures "to all put the same effort, resources and energy into ending the crime of racism, economic injustice and political denial throughout the nation".

==== Late 2010s ====
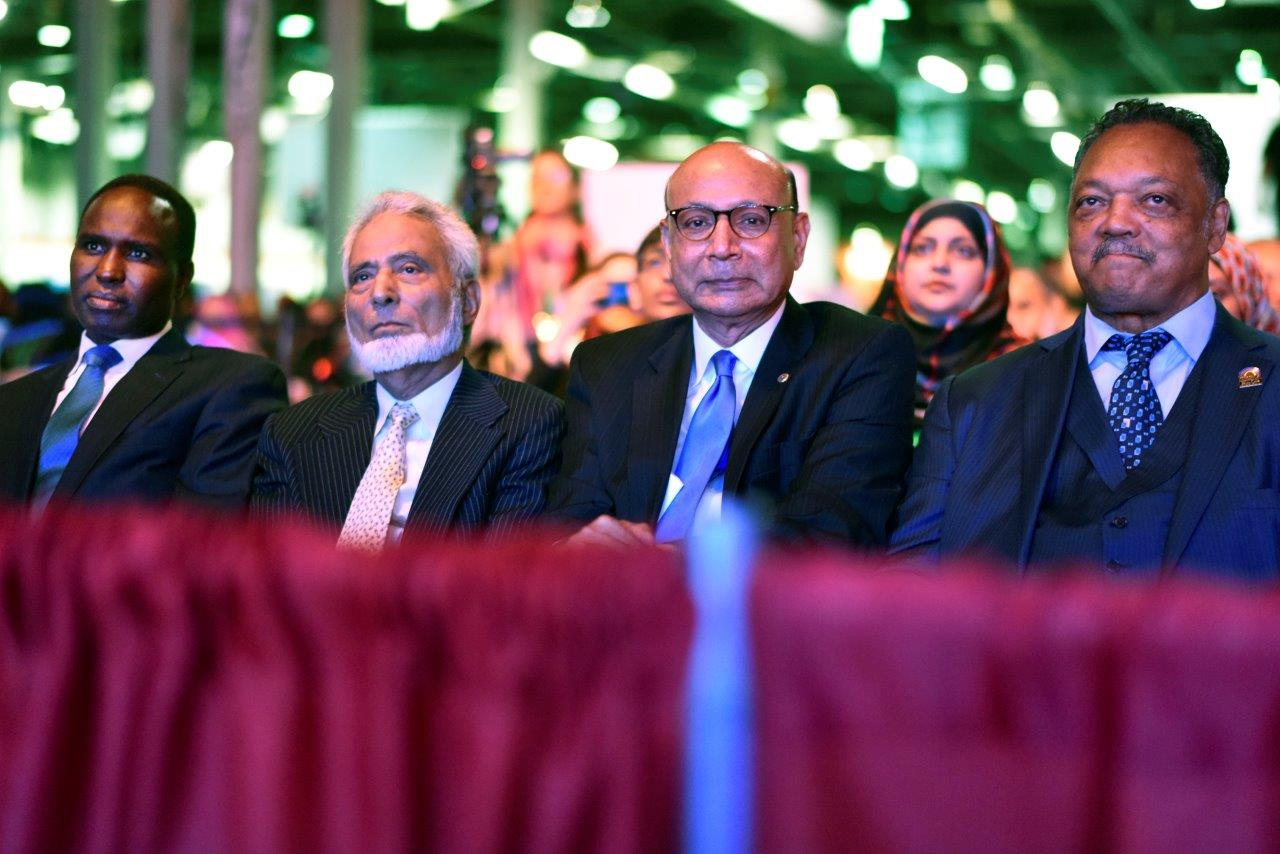
Jackson at the Islamic Society of North America convention in Chicago, September 2016

Jackson declined to endorse either Hillary Clinton or Bernie Sanders in the 2016 Democratic presidential primary, citing his longtime associations with both. After Clinton secured the nomination, Jackson endorsed her. In July, Republican nominee Donald Trump released a video condemning the police killings of Alton Sterling and Philando Castile. Jackson admitted the video contained "significant remarks" but faulted Trump for his past involvement in the birther movement and past rhetoric that had "helped to seed these clouds". Days before the election, Jackson cited several reasons for voters to support Clinton over Trump, including the possible repeal of the Affordable Care Act and the appointment of U.S. Supreme Court justices and urged them to "join the right side of history". Trump defeated Clinton in the general election, and Jackson shortly thereafter wrote an op-ed for The Guardian saying that Trump "must prove he is worthy of the office by immediately going to work uniting the country he has done so much to divide."

Jackson attended the Women's March on Washington, where he said that both a half-century of civil rights and the right to vote had been threatened. In April, he participated in the Miami, Florida, Hispanicize conference, where he called the Trump administration's efforts to set up deportation camps "Germanesque" and denounced the more than 30 Hispanic-owned firms who put in a bid to construct the border wall. When he visited St. John Baptist Church in Orlando, Jackson stated his support for the Presidential Advisory Commission on Election Integrity investigating the suppression of minority voters, noting that between 1.3 and 1.7 million voters were ineligible to vote in Florida due to felony convictions. In September, he gave a speech at the Ministers March for Justice, saying, "Trump says you must be able to speak the language of English, [be] qualified and have a job skill. Jesus would not qualify to come in Trump's country. Trump would not qualify to get into Jesus' kingdom." After Colin Kaepernick was not signed by the NFL for kneeling during the national anthem, and Trump denounced players who joined Kaepernick in kneeling in protest, Jackson urged a boycott of the NFL as long "as their boycott of Colin Kaepernick continues" and said that Trump should instead focus on helping victims of Hurricane Maria.

In January 2018, Jackson delivered a sermon at a church in Fort Washington, Maryland, in which he accused Trump of being misleading and called him a "man of inherited wealth and privilege who seems to have no understanding of our situation". Ahead of the 50th anniversary of King's assassination, Jackson wrote an op-ed for The New York Times reflecting on King's accomplishments and his continued relevance in current struggles. He asserted that those "who value justice and equality must have the will and courage to follow him." In September, Jackson attended the Angela Project Conference with Congressman John Yarmuth and Mayor of Louisville Greg Fischer, noting injustices in America such as wealth inequality and the disproportionate number of imprisoned African-Americans. Jackson also said that both the Devil and Trump were temporary and would be outlasted by "the Lord".

In February 2019, after Jussie Smollett was reported to have been assaulted in a hate crime, Jackson called the attack an attempt at a "barbaric lynching". Although Trump condemned the assault, Jackson charged him with emboldening bigots through his rhetoric and actions, warning of the revival of demeaning and bullying. Smollett was later charged with falsifying the attack, and Jackson was among those who wrote to the judge handling the case, requesting leniency for Smollett as he had already been "excoriated and vilified in the court of public opinion" and had his professional reputation "severely damaged".

After Trump attacked Congresswoman Ilhan Omar with multiple false claims, Jackson warned that Trump was "making people afraid of her, and it's going to produce violence", noting King's assassination came after he was "defamed" and "vilified by the government." Jackson and his son Jesse Jr. sent Trump a letter requesting that he pardon former Governor of Illinois Rod Blagojevich, the father-son pair declaring that they stood with the Blagojevich family "as they seek a full pardon for a father and husband that has served most of a sentence that was far longer than the offense deserved". During the 2019 Venezuelan presidential crisis, Jackson delivered food to activists occupying the Venezuelan embassy in Washington, D.C.

In June, Jackson went to Alvin S. Glenn Detention Center to encourage inmates to vote as part of a voter registration drive in South Carolina with particular focus on students, seniors, and working-class residents. Months later, he visited Paine College to further encourage voting, saying America was "being torn asunder by inviting Russia and China and Iran and others into the election process. The gap isn't between black and white so much as it's between the have and the have-nots." In November, Jackson spoke at the funeral of former Representative John Conyers.

==== 2020s ====
In June 2019, as Biden prepared to deliver remarks for Rainbow PUSH in his capacity as a candidate in the 2020 Democratic Party presidential primaries, Jackson said he did not understand Biden's previous support for segregated school busing but believed "he's changed" and expressed his opposition to states' rights. In March 2020, Jackson endorsed Bernie Sanders in the primary. He said that Sanders made several commitments to him, and it was reported that he requested Sanders pick an African-American woman as his running mate. Sanders dropped out of the race a month later, and Biden became the Democratic presidential nominee. As the 2020 election neared, Jackson said that Trump had left "African Americans in the deepest hole with the shortest rope" and predicted "African Americans—and particularly African-American women—will vote overwhelmingly for Joe Biden". Biden defeated Trump in the general election, fulfilling Jackson's prediction by winning an overwhelming majority of the black vote. Ahead of Biden's inauguration, Jackson wrote an op-ed calling for "an aspirational agenda—an agenda that reveals the scope of action needed to meet the challenges we face, and that provides hope and galvanizes support" and pressed for Biden to demonstrate bold action and leadership.

In June 2020, after the killing of Breonna Taylor, Jackson praised Mayor of Louisville Greg Fischer for announcing a review of police conduct and policies and criticized Senator Rand Paul for delaying a bill that would make lynching a hate crime. In September, Jackson and Jacob Blake's uncle Justin marched in Kenosha, Wisconsin, and spoke at Grace Lutheran Church, where he condemned Blake's and Taylor's shooting deaths. In October, Jackson met with the Taylor and Blake families and led a march with them in Evanston, Illinois.

After police officer Derek Chauvin murdered George Floyd, Jackson traveled to Minnesota and called for Michael O. Freeman to press charges against the four Minneapolis Police Department officers involved in Floyd's murder. Jackson said protests should continue "until something happens" and advocated for protesters to obey social distancing protocols in order to prevent the spread of COVID-19. Chauvin was convicted of Floyd's murder in April 2021. Jackson appeared with the Floyd family at a press conference shortly after the verdict, where he told attendees that they would have to "learn to live together as brothers and sisters and not die apart". Jackson supported the withdrawal of United States troops from Afghanistan, calling it "long past time to end the folly in Afghanistan" and "long past time to start investing in the future of America's children and in meeting the existential threat posed by climate change."

On August 3, 2021, Jackson and several others were arrested after protesting for Congress to end the filibuster, protect voting rights and raise the federal minimum wage to $15 an hour. In 2022, he wrote to an Argentinian judge in defense of the leaders of a yoga school who had been accused of forcing women into prostitution. Ahead of the 2023 State of the Union Address, Jackson wrote an op-ed calling for Biden "to lay out a plan—and to call the Congress to act" by extending the Child Tax Credit to low-income workers and the poor, making voter registration automatic, limiting big money in politics, and reviving the Voting Rights Act. On March 5, Jackson attended an event on the Edmund Pettus Bridge commemorating the 59th anniversary of Bloody Sunday and spoke with Biden.

In July 2023, Jackson announced his plans to step down as the leader of Rainbow/PUSH. His decision was caused by his advanced age as well as health complications: Jackson was diagnosed with Parkinson's disease in 2017 and was hospitalized twice in 2021, after testing positive for COVID-19 and then after a head injury. Chicago Mayor Brandon Johnson said that Jackson was "an architect of the soul of Chicago... His faith, his perseverance, his love, and his relentless dedication to people inspire all of us to keep pushing for a better tomorrow". Al Sharpton, a civil rights activist, said he considers Jackson his mentor, "the resignation of Reverend Jesse Jackson is the pivoting of one of the most productive, prophetic, and dominant figures in the struggle for social justice in American history". In May 2024, Jackson wrote in The Chicago Maroon about the Gaza war. He condemned the October 7 attacks, but said that Israel's response, an attack on Palestinian civilians, was a "massacre". He expressed support for pro-Palestinian protests on college campuses and compared them to divestment campaigns for South Africa, which were proposed in the 1960s but did not ramp up until the mid-1980s.

== Posthumous political impact ==
In March 2026, during the Illinois US Senate Democratic primary, Lieutenant Governor Juliana Stratton said that Jackson had included her in a list of endorsements before his death. On the day before the primary, Yusef Jackson issued a statement walking back the alleged endorsement, saying the process had not been finalized.

== Electoral history ==
1984 Democratic Party presidential primaries
Candidate	Votes	%
Walter Mondale	6,952,912	38.32
Gary Hart	6,504,842	35.85
Jesse Jackson	3,282,431	18.09
John Glenn	617,909	3.41
George McGovern	334,801	1.85
Unpledged	146,212	0.81
Lyndon LaRouche	123,649	0.68
Reubin O'Donovan Askew	52,759	0.29
Alan Cranston	51,437	0.28
Ernest Hollings	33,684	0.19

1984 Democratic National Convention delegate voting
Candidate	Votes	%
Walter Mondale	2,191	56.41
Gary Hart	1,201	30.92
Jesse Jackson	466	12.00
Thomas F. Eagleton	18	0.46
George McGovern	4	0.10
John Glenn	2	0.05
Joe Biden	1	0.03

1988 Democratic Party presidential primaries, States Jackson won in pink

1988 Democratic presidential primaries
Candidate	Votes	%
Michael Dukakis	9,898,750	42.47
Jesse Jackson	6,788,991	29.13
Al Gore	3,185,806	13.67
Dick Gephardt	1,399,041	6.00
Paul M. Simon	1,082,960	4.65
Gary Hart	415,716	1.78
Unpledged	250,307	1.07
Bruce Babbitt	77,780	0.33
Lyndon LaRouche	70,938	0.30
David Duke	45,289	0.19
James Traficant	30,879	0.13
Douglas E. Applegate	25,068	0.11

1988 Democratic National Convention delegate voting
Candidate	Votes	%
Michael Dukakis	2,877	70.09
Jesse Jackson	1,219	29.70
Richard H. Stallings	3	0.07
Joe Biden	2	0.05
Dick Gephardt	2	0.05
Lloyd Bentsen	1	0.02
Gary Hart	1	0.02

Shadow Senator from District of Columbia, 1990
Primary election
Party	Candidate	Votes	%
	Jesse Jackson	85,454	57.03
	Florence Pendleton	25,349	16.92
	Harry "Tommy" Thomas Jr.	22,401	14.95
	James Forman	9,899	6.61
	Marc Humphries	6,739	4.50
Total votes		149,842	100.00
General election
	Jesse Jackson	105,633	46.80
	Florence Pendleton	58,451	25.89
	Harry T. Alexander	13,983	6.19
	Milton Francis	13,538	6.00
	Joan Gillison	12,845	5.69
	Keith M. Wilkerson	4,545	2.01
	Anthony W. Peacock	4,285	1.90
	John West	3,621	1.60
	David L. Whitehead	3,341	1.48
	Sam Manuel	2,765	1.23
	Lee Black	2,728	1.21
Total votes		215,735	100.00
	Democratic win (new seat)		

== Personal life ==
=== Marriage and family ===
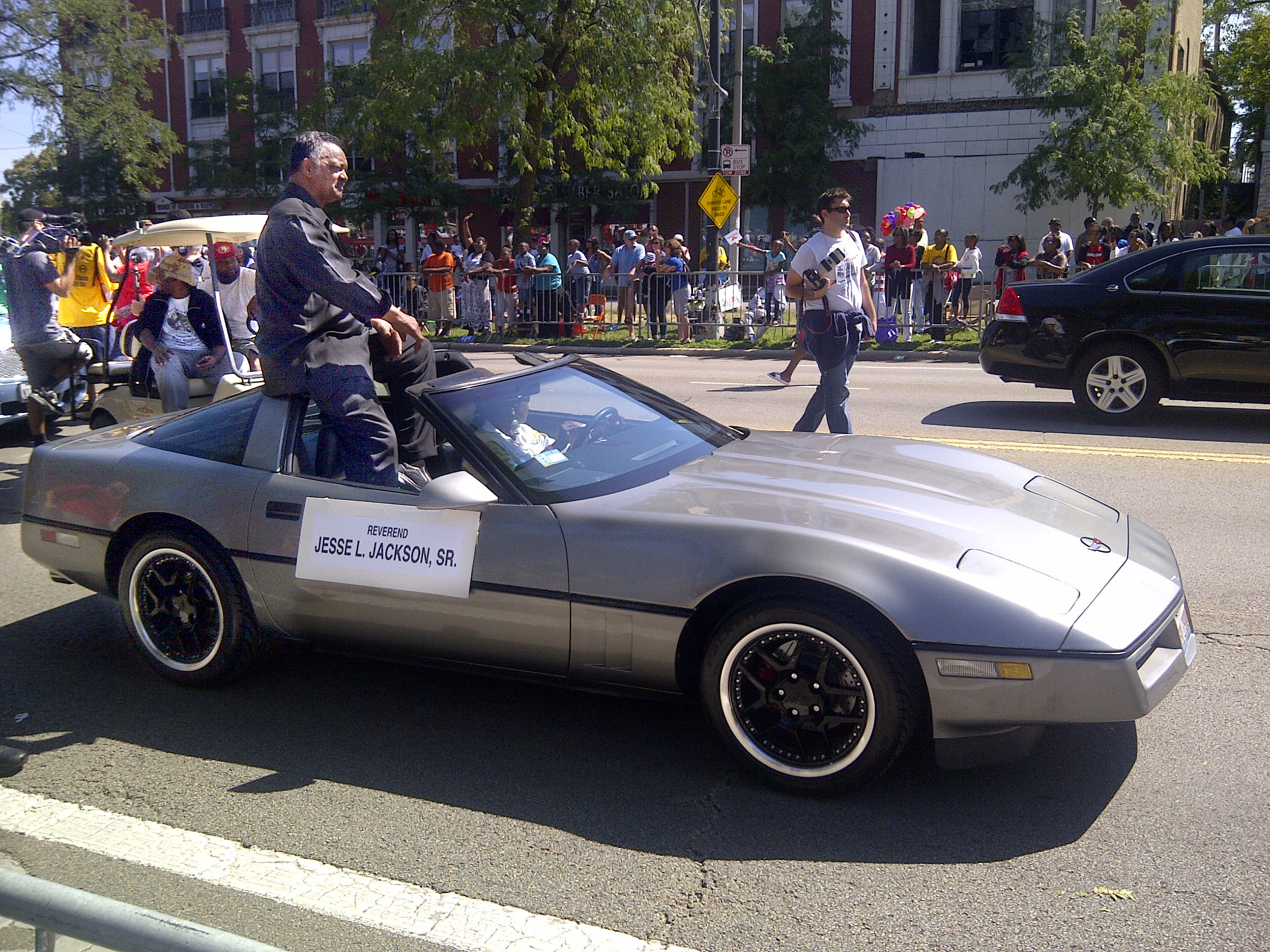
Jackson at the 2012 Bud Billiken Parade

Jackson married Jacqueline Lavinia Brown (born 1944) on December 31, 1962, and together they had five children, including political commentator Santita (1963), former U.S. representative Jesse Jr. (1965), attorney Yusef (1970), and U.S. representative Jonathan Luther (1966).

Jackson's younger brother, Charles "Chuck", was a singer with the vocal group The Independents and released two albums as a solo artist in the late 1970s. Along with his songwriting partner and fellow producer, Marvin Yancy, he was largely responsible for launching Natalie Cole's career.

On May 25, 1987, Jackson was made a Master Mason on Sight by Grand Master Senter of the Most Worshipful Prince Hall Grand Lodge of Illinois, thereby becoming a Prince Hall Freemason. Jackson had friendships with Ted Kennedy, Bernie Sanders, Aretha Franklin, Bobby Bland, Elijah Cummings, John Lewis, Maxine Waters, and Michael Jackson.

In January 2001, it was revealed that Jackson had had an affair with a staffer, Karin Stanford, which resulted in the birth of a daughter, Ashley Jackson, in May 1999. According to CNN, in August 1999 the Rainbow Push Coalition paid Stanford $15,000 (equivalent to $28,990 in 2025) in moving expenses and $21,000 (equivalent to $40,590 in 2025) for contracting work. A promised advance of an additional $40,000 against future contracting work was rescinded once the affair became public. This incident prompted Jackson to withdraw from activism for a short period. He was paying $4,000 a month in child support as of 2001. CNN suspended, and later canceled, Both Sides with Jesse Jackson.

=== Health issues ===
In September 2008, Jackson was admitted to Northwestern Memorial Hospital after experiencing dehydration and stomach pains. Doctors diagnosed him with viral gastroenteritis. In November 2017, he was diagnosed with Parkinson's disease. In August 2021, he and his wife were hospitalized with COVID-19 at Northwestern Memorial Hospital in Chicago. On August 27, it was reported that he had been transferred to a rehabilitation facility, while his wife had been moved to the intensive care unit. She was released from the hospital on September 4, while Jackson continued to receive care for Parkinson's.

In 2025, Jackson was hospitalized in Chicago from November 14 to 24. Rainbow PUSH said his diagnosis had been changed in April 2025 to progressive supranuclear palsy (PSP), a neurodegenerative condition that has symptoms that can resemble those of Parkinson's. Among those who visited him during his stay were Bill and Hillary Clinton, Al Sharpton, and Greg Mathis. In December, his family announced that he was in an acute nursing facility in stable condition and was expected to return home soon. He was discharged from the facility on December 22.

== Death and funeral ==
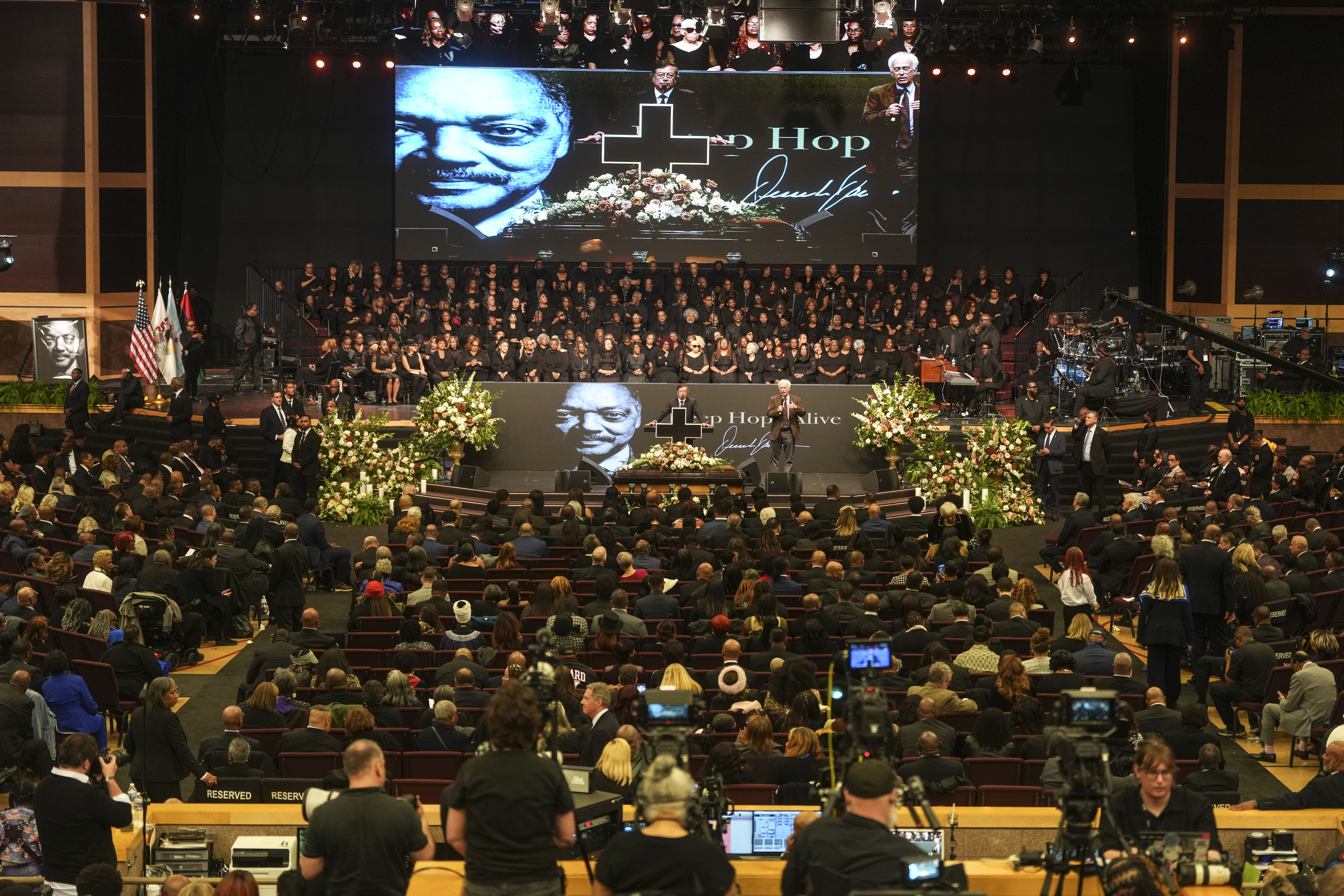
Colombian president Gustavo Petro giving a eulogy at Jackson's funeral, March 2026.

Jackson died at his home in Chicago on February 17, 2026, at the age of 84. His family announced his death on social media.

=== Tributes ===
Tributes were published from U.S. President Donald Trump, Al Sharpton, William Barber II, former U.S. Presidents Bill Clinton (in a joint statement with his wife, Hillary), Barack Obama (in a joint statement with his wife, Michelle), and Joe Biden, attorney Benjamin Crump, Chuck Schumer, Martin Luther King III, former U.S. Vice President Kamala Harris, former Ambassador Andrew Young, South Carolina Governor Henry McMaster, South Carolina U.S. Senators Lindsey Graham and Tim Scott, Alveda King, Hakeem Jeffries, Rahm Emanuel, Brandon Johnson, Raphael Warnock, Bernice King, Frank Scott Jr., South Carolina Congressman Jim Clyburn, South Carolina State Representative Wendell Gilliard, Benedict College, and King Charles III. On February 28, 2026, NAACP CEO Derrick Johnson and Samuel L. Jackson paid tribute to Jesse Jackson at the 2026 NAACP Image Awards, televised on CBS and BET. Samuel L. Jackson dressed in African attire and invoked Jesse Jackson's "keep hope alive" and "I am somebody" messages. Jackson's family was in attendance.

North Carolina Governor Josh Stein ordered all U.S. and North Carolina flags at state facilities lowered to half-staff from sunrise on February 19 to sunset on February 28. Illinois Governor JB Pritzker also ordered the lowering of state flags during this period. Kentucky Governor Andy Beshear ordered flags lowered on March 7, the day of Jackson's funeral. Colorado Governor Jared Polis ordered flags lowered on March 5 and 6. Michigan Governor Gretchen Whitmer ordered flags lowered on February 26 and 27. Iowa Governor Kim Reynolds ordered flags lowered from sunrise to sunset on February 27. Flags were ordered lowered in Connecticut, New York, Delaware, New Jersey, Minnesota, Pennsylvania and the District of Columbia. South Carolina Governor Henry McMaster's office announced that flags would be lowered on March 2.

On February 18, Jackson's family revealed that as part of his celebration of life services, Jackson would lie in state at the Rainbow/PUSH headquarters in Chicago on February 26 and 27. Plans were later expanded to include celebrations in South Carolina and Washington, D.C., with the church service and final celebration in Chicago moved to March 6 and 7. A request for Jackson to lie in state in the U.S. Capitol was denied by Speaker of the U.S. House of Representatives Mike Johnson. On March 1, Jackson's wife Jacqueline became ill in Nashville, and plans were made for her to return to Chicago after being released from care. The Jackson family stated their intention to "honor its commitment to the State of South Carolina" and afterward "return home to Chicago". The Washington D.C. service was postponed.

=== Illinois lying in state and service ===
On February 26, Jackson's casket arrived at Rainbow/PUSH headquarters, and Jackson lay in state there in an open casket starting at 10 a.m. At the February 26 service, Al Sharpton made remarks, with Chicago Mayor Brandon Johnson, former Congressman Bobby Rush, Illinois Comptroller Susana Mendoza, and Cook County Sheriff Tom Dart among those in attendance. Public viewing took place for a second and final time at the Rainbow/PUSH headquarters on February 27. On February 28, the Jackson cortege departed Chicago.

=== South Carolina lying in state and service ===
On March 1, the Jackson cortege arrived in Columbia, South Carolina. While in South Carolina, Jackson's body was kept at Leevy's Funeral Home in Columbia.

External videos
- Jesse Jackson memorial service, Columbia, South Carolina, March 2, 2026, C-SPAN

On March 2, Jackson's casket, draped with an American flag, departed Leevy's Funeral Home and arrived at the South Carolina State House on a horse-drawn carriage. After it entered the State House rotunda, a private ceremony was held for the Jackson family. Among those in attendance were former Ambassador Andrew Young, former State Representative I. S. Leevy Johnson, South Carolina Legislative Black Caucus Chair Representative Annie McDaniel, television judge Greg Mathis, University of South Carolina coach Dawn Staley, and State Representative Wendell Gilliard.

After this ceremony, Jackson lay in state at the South Carolina State House, the second African American to be so honored after Clementa Pinckney. Flags on top of the State House were lowered from sunrise to sunset, as directed by Governor McMaster. Afterward, a public memorial service was held at Brookland Baptist Church in West Columbia, South Carolina, with eldest child Santita Jackson, Congressman Jim Clyburn, Columbia, South Carolina mayor and Biden Appointee Stephen K. Benjamin, Benedict College president Roslyn Artis, CNN Commentor Bakari Sellers and civil rights activist Cleveland Sellers and former State Representative James Felder, among the speakers. Priscilla Williams-Till, a cousin of Emmett Till, attended the service and gave remarks to the press about links between Jackson, Emmett, and his mother Mamie Till.

External videos
- Jesse Jackson memorial service, House of Hope, Chicago, March 6, 2026, C-SPAN

The Jackson family left South Carolina on March 5.

=== Illinois public and private funeral ===
On March 6, former U.S. Presidents Bill Clinton, Barack Obama, and Joe Biden and former First Ladies Hillary Clinton and Jill Biden attended Jackson's House of Hope memorial service. James Meeks and Charles Jenkins co-officiated. Jackson family members, President Clinton, President Obama, former Vice President Kamala Harris, Illinois Governor JB Pritzker, Chicago Mayor Brandon Johnson, and Colombia president Gustavo Petro spoke at the public service. Jackson's final memorial service, which involved members of his family and African leaders such as South African president Cyril Ramaphosa and Democratic Republic of Congo president Felix Tshisekedi, was held at Rainbow/PUSH headquarters on March 7. Jackson was buried at a private service at Oak Woods Cemetery.

== Legacy ==
=== Awards and honors ===
In 1969, Jackson was named Omega Psi Phi Outstanding Citizen of the Year.

In 1971, Ebony Magazine named Jackson to its "100 most influential black Americans" list.

In 1972, Morgan State University conferred upon Jackson the honorary Doctor of Humane Letters degree.

In 1979, Jackson received the Jefferson Award for Greatest Public Service Benefiting the Disadvantaged.

In 1988, the NAACP awarded Jackson its President's Award, and the next year, the organization awarded him the Spingarn Medal.

In 1991, Jackson received the American Whig–Cliosophic Society's James Madison Award for Distinguished Public Service.

In 1999, Jackson received the Golden Doves for Peace journalistic prize awarded by the Italian Research Institute Archive Disarmo.

In 1999, Jackson received the Order of the Palmetto, South Carolina's highest civilian honor, from Governor Jim Hodges.

In 1999, Jackson received an honorary degree from Mitchell College and was a keynote speaker.

In 2000, Bill Clinton awarded Jackson the Presidential Medal of Freedom, the nation's highest honor bestowed on civilians.

In 2000, Jackson received an honorary master's degree from Chicago Theological Seminary, in recognition of his decades of civic service.

In 2002, scholar Molefi Kete Asante included Jackson on his list of 100 Greatest African Americans.

In 2004, Jackson was inducted into the International Civil Rights Walk of Fame.

In 2007, Jackson was elected an Honorary Fellow of Regent's Park College, Oxford.

In 2008, Jackson was presented with an Honorary Fellowship from Edge Hill University. In an AP-AOL "Black Voices" poll in February 2006, Jackson was voted "the most important black leader".

In 2009, Jackson inherited the title of the High Prince of the Agni people of Côte d'Ivoire from Michael Jackson. The same year, he was crowned Prince Côte Nana by Amon N'Douffou V, King of Krindjabo, who rules more than a million Agni tribespeople. Jackson and his wife were also titleholders in the Nigerian chieftaincy system.

In 2011, Jackson was granted an honorary degree at De Montfort University, Leicester.

In 2012, Jackson received an honorary doctorate from Cheyney University of Pennsylvania.

In 2015, Jackson was awarded an honorary degree of Doctor Honoris Causa from the University of Edinburgh, in recognition of decades of campaigning for civil rights.

In 2021, Jackson was appointed Commander of the Legion of Honor, France's highest order of merit, presented by French president Emmanuel Macron, for his work in civil rights. The same year, he was elected an Honorary Fellow of Homerton College, Cambridge.

In 2022, Jackson received an Honorary Doctor of Humane Letters degree from Benedict College.

In 2026, a section of Haynie Street in Greenville, where Jackson was born, was renamed Reverend Jesse L. Jackson, Sr., Street.

=== Public image ===
In 1987, Donald Rheem called Jackson "one of the most successful black leaders in American history, with 25 years of public service as a self-styled country preacher pushing voter registration, inner-city economic development, and a moral message telling blacks to get off drugs and get on with a fulfilling life." For The Harvard Crimson, David J. Barron wrote that Jackson had "become the undisputed leader of Blacks partly on the strength of his call for young Blacks to recognize that despite their disadvantages they are 'somebody.'" Jackson was often called a civil rights icon and praised as a gifted orator. His 1980s presidential campaigns are seen as historic and credited with increasing black voter turnout, exceeding expectations, and paving the way for Barack Obama's 2008 campaign. Former Democratic National Committee Chairwoman Donna Brazile commended Jackson for helping "to enable a new generation of African Americans to serve" through his presidential campaign.

Herb Benham claimed Jackson last had "credibility" when he was involved with the Southern Christian Leadership Conference, Operation PUSH, and marching with King, which he added was "so many decades ago that it makes the corporate-blackmailing, publicity-sniffing, knee-jerking Jackson seem as if he has had two lives—one respectable and one not." Jackson was also charged with exploiting racial divides for his gain, Larry Elder writes that Jackson, Sharpton, Farrakhan, and Bill Clinton have had careers predicated "on exaggerating the extent and the impact of anti-black white racism" and had each "earned a nice living promoting the bogus anti-black-white-racism-remains-a-serious-problem narrative." A proponent of marriage, Jackson was accused of hypocrisy for fathering a child out of wedlock.

In October 2021, renowned television judge Greg Mathis described Jackson as "my most impactful mentor," with the two first meeting when Jackson visited the jail Mathis was being held in. According to Mathis, it was Jackson who "suggested I get my GED, go to college and become an activist."

=== Relations with the Jewish community ===
Jackson was criticized for calling Jews "Hymies" and New York City "Hymietown" in 1984 remarks to a black reporter for The Washington Post; "Hymie" is a pejorative term for Jews. He had mistakenly assumed the references would not be printed. Louis Farrakhan made the situation worse by publicly warning, in Jackson's presence, that "If you harm this brother [Jackson], it will be the last one you harm." During a speech before national Jewish leaders in a Manchester, New Hampshire, synagogue, Jackson publicly apologized to Jews for his remarks but did not denounce Farrakhan's warning. A rift between Jackson and many in the Jewish community endured until at least the 1990s.

According to a 1987 article in The New York Times, Jackson began attempting to improve his relationship with the Jewish community after 1984. In 2000, he was invited to speak in support of Jewish U.S. senator and vice-presidential nominee Joe Lieberman at the Democratic National Convention. After the Pittsburgh synagogue shooting, the deadliest attack on the Jewish community in the U.S., Jackson joined other clergy at Congregation Sukkat Shalom in Wilmette to honor the 11 victims, saying: "When nine black lives were lost at Charleston, rabbis were there for us. Now we are here for this community." On March 8, 2020, Jackson endorsed Bernie Sanders, who is Jewish, for president.

During his House of Hope memorial service on March 6, 2026, Rabbi Steven Jacobs, who acknowledged his decades-long friendship with Jackson, addressed the controversy, vehemently denying that Jackson was an antisemite.

In 2026, Jackson's daughter Ashley announced that she had converted to Judaism and that her father had supported her decision to do so.

== See also ==
- "I Am – Somebody"—a poem popularized by Jesse Jackson
- List of civil rights leaders
- List of notable Freemasons
- Purpose, a 2024 play inspired by Jackson's family

== Bibliography ==
- Dudley, K. (1994). The End of the Line. Chicago: University of Chicago Press. ISBN 0-226-16908-1.
- Jackson, Jesse L. Jr.; with Frank E. Watkins (2001). A More Perfect Union: Advancing New American Rights. New York: Welcome Rain Publishers. ISBN 1-56649-186-X.

Party political offices
New seat	Democratic nominee for U.S. Shadow Senator from the District of Columbia (Class 2); 1990	Succeeded by Paul Strauss
U.S. Senate
New seat	U.S. Shadow Senator (Class 2) from the District of Columbia; 1991–1997; Served alongside: Florence Pendleton	Succeeded by Paul Strauss
