= Frank McBride =

American politician

Member of the South Carolina House of Representatives from the 74th district
- In office 1985–1991
- Preceded by: Thomas Broadwater
- Succeeded by: Alma Byrd

Personal details
- Party: Democratic
- Spouse: Jeannette McBride

Frank Earl McBride (born 1943) is an American politician.

McBride served as a Democratic member for the 74th district in the South Carolina House of Representatives from 1985 to 1991. McBride resigned his seat as a result of Operation Lost Trust after pleading guilty to accepting $1000 in bribes.
