= Alma W. Byrd =

American politician

Member of the South Carolina House of Representatives from the 74th district
- In office 1991–1998
- Preceded by: Frank McBride
- Succeeded by: Todd Rutherford

Personal details
- Born: Alma Weaver; September 18, 1923 Aiken, South Carolina
- Died: May 3, 2017 (aged 93) Columbia, South Carolina
- Party: Democratic
- Spouse: Wallace Byrd
- Education: Columbia University; University of South Carolina Benedict College
- Profession: Educator, Professor, Philanthropist

Alma Weaver Byrd (September 18, 1923 – May 3, 2017) was an American politician.

== Early life, education and career ==
Byrd was born in Aiken, South Carolina. She graduated from Benedict College, Columbia University, and the University of South Carolina. She taught English and French at Benedict College. Dr. Byrd also was a published author.

== Political career ==
Byrd served on the Richland County School District One Board and was the vice-chair of the school board. Byrd served as a Democratic member for the 74th district in the South Carolina House of Representatives from 1991 to 1998.

Rep. Byrd introduced legislation leading to the commission and placement of a portrait of Modjeska Monteith Simkins in the South Carolina State House. The Simkins portrait was painted by Columbia artist Larry Francis Lebby.
