= Thomas Broadwater =

American politician (1935–2022)

Member of the South Carolina House of Representatives from the 74th district
- In office 1980–1984
- Preceded by: I. S. Leevy Johnson
- Succeeded by: Frank McBride

Personal details
- Born: January 14, 1935
- Died: April 25, 2022 (aged 87)
- Party: Democratic
- Occupation: Lawyer

Thomas Delano Broadwater Sr. (January 14, 1935 – April 25, 2022) was an attorney and American politician.

== Biography ==
He attended a one-room schoolhouse for African Americans. Broadwater was among the earliest graduates of the College of Law of Florida A&M University.

Broadwater served as a Democratic member for the 74th district in the South Carolina House of Representatives from 1980 to 1984.
