= Herbert Fielding =

American politician

Member of the South Carolina State Senate
- In office 1985–1992

Member of the South Carolina House of Representatives
- In office 1983–1984
- In office 1971–1973

Personal details
- Born: Herbert Ulysses Gaillard Fielding; July 6, 1923 Charleston, South Carolina
- Died: August 10, 2015 (aged 92) Charleston, South Carolina
- Spouse: Thelma Erenne Stent
- Children: Julius P. L. II, Herbert Stent, and Frederick Augustus
- Education: West Virginia State College
- Occupation: Funeral director

Herbert Ulysses Gaillard Fielding (July 6, 1923 – August 10, 2015) was an American politician who became the first African-American elected as a Democrat to the South Carolina General Assembly.

== Family and early years ==
Herbert Ulysses Fielding was the son of Julius and Sadie Fielding. Fielding served in the United States Army during World War II prior to attending and receiving his B.S. degree from West Virginia State College in 1948.

In 1952, Fielding took charge of the day-to-day operations of the family funeral home business, becoming President and CEO of Fielding Home for Funeral Services. Founded in 1912 by Fielding’s father, Fielding Home for Funeral Services was the largest African American-owned and operated funeral home in the state of South Carolina. Fielding died on August 10, 2015.

== Civil Rights Movement ==
Fielding became involved in the Civil Rights Movement in the 1960s. He often paid for the bail of civil rights activists, picketers and demonstrators. Fielding encouraged African Americans to vote and mobilized them to memorize the constitution in order to gain voting rights. Fielding's political papers from that era are housed at the College of Charleston.

== Political career ==
=== South Carolina General Assembly ===
Fielding was elected to the South Carolina House of Representatives in 1970, becoming the first of three African Americans (including James Felder and I. S. Levy Johnson) to be elected to the South Carolina Legislature since Reconstruction. Fielding served for three years, then returned to the South Carolina House in 1983. In 1985, Fielding was elected to the South Carolina Senate, where he served until 1992. In 1990, he became the chairperson of the South Carolina Legislative Black Caucus.

=== 1992 US Congressional Election ===
See 1992 United States House of Representatives elections in South Carolina

See 1992 United States House of Representatives elections

See South Carolina's 6th congressional district

Fielding was one of five men running to be the first Black person elected to Congress from South Carolina since George W. Murray during Reconstruction. In the 1992 Democratic Primary for the 6th Congressional district were Fielding, John Roy Harper II, Jim Clyburn, State Senator Frank Gilbert, and Dr. Kenneth Mosely, an educator.
