= I. S. Leevy Johnson =

American politician

I.S. Leevy Johnson

Member of the South Carolina House of Representatives from the 74th district
- In office 1970–1980
- Succeeded by: Thomas Broadwater

Personal details
- Born: Isaac Samuel Leevy Johnson; May 16, 1942 (age 84) Columbia, South Carolina
- Party: Democratic
- Occupation: Lawyer, funeral director

Isaac Samuel Leevy Johnson (born May 16, 1942) is an American politician in the state of South Carolina. He served in the South Carolina House of Representatives from 1970 to 1980, representing Richland County, South Carolina, as a Democrat. He is a lawyer and owner of Leevy's Funeral Home.

Johnson graduated from the University of Minnesota in 1962 with an associate of mortuary science degree. He then matriculated at Benedict College, receiving a bachelor's degree in business in 1965. He became the first African American in the 20th century to graduate from the University of South Carolina School of Law in 1968.

In 1970, Johnson became one of the first black men elected to the South Carolina General Assembly since the Reconstruction era, alongside James Felder and Herbert Fielding. After leaving the legislature he became a member of the board of trustees at then South Carolina State College. At its very first meeting, he was elected chair of the board. In 1990, he was awarded the Order of the Palmetto and has received every major award (including being inducted into the American College of Trial Lawyers) for accredited attorneys in the United States. In 1985, he became the first black president of the South Carolina Bar.

He still practices law with his son George Craig Johnson and operates the family funeral home with his other son, Chris Leevy Johnson.
