= James Felder =

American politician and civil rights activist (born 1939)

James L. Felder

Member of the South Carolina House of Representatives
- In office 1970–1972

Personal details
- Born: April 4, 1939 (age 87) Sumter, South Carolina, US
- Education: Howard University School of Law, Clark Atlanta University
- Occupation: Politician, civil rights activist
- Website: jameslfelder.com

James L. Felder (born April 4, 1939) is an American politician and civil rights activist who was one of the first three African Americans to serve in the South Carolina Legislature since the Reconstruction era. A Democrat, he served in the South Carolina House of Representatives from 1970 to 1972 alongside Herbert Fielding and I. S. Levy Johnson. Felder was a pallbearer at the funeral of President John F. Kennedy.

== Life and career ==
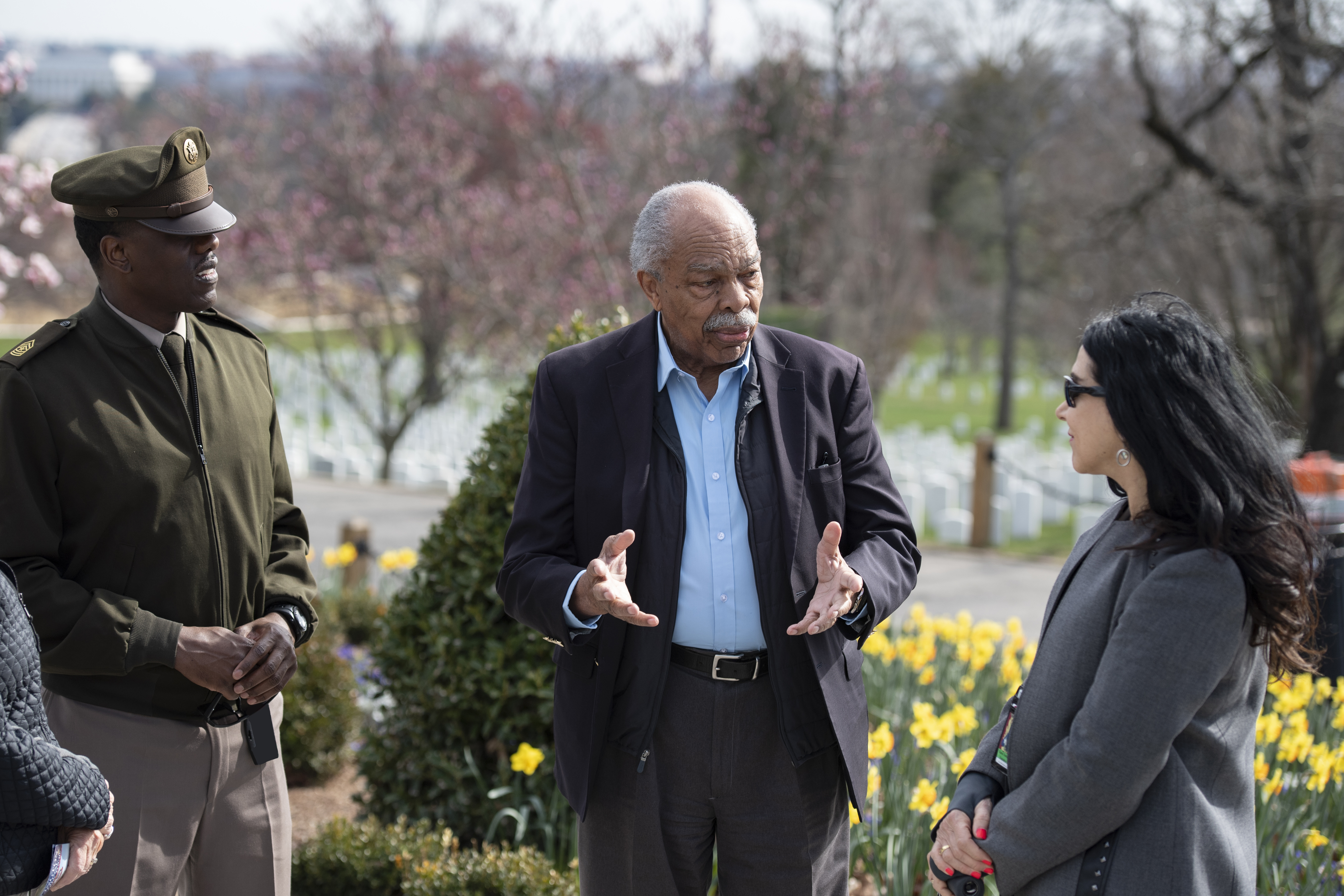
During a visit to the grave of President John F. Kennedy on March 12, 2024, James Felder (center) speaks with Karen Durham-Aguilera and Sgt. Maj. Donnie Davis of the Office of Army Cemeteries and Army National Military Cemeteries.

Felder was born in Sumter, South Carolina, on April 4, 1939. As a teenager he attended the Mt. Pisgah AME Church in Sumter, where he served as vice president of the church's youth council. Future U.S. Congressman and House Majority Whip Jim Clyburn served as council president at the same time.

Felder received academic and football scholarships to attend Clark College in Atlanta, Georgia, where he pursued the pre-medical track, studying biology and chemistry. At Clark he served as student body president and became active in the Atlanta Student Movement, participating in student-led sit-ins and demonstrations starting in 1960. He marched with student activists Julian Bond, Lonnie King, and Marion Wright Edelman and met with Martin Luther King Jr. Arrested several times during protests, he switched his plans from medical to law school, graduating from Clark College in June 1961.

Felder was drafted into the United States Army in January 1962 and deployed that summer to Arlington National Cemetery as a member of the 3rd U.S. Infantry Regiment (The Old Guard). He was one of only ten African American soldiers to have served in the regiment up to that point. Promoted to sergeant, he served as a pallbearer and head of the casket detail at the funeral of President John F. Kennedy in November 1963.

Leaving the army in January 1964 after his term of service ended, Felder enrolled in Howard University School of Law while working at a post office in Washington, D.C. When Felder graduated in June 1967, Vernon Jordan recruited him to lead the Voter Education Project, a privately funded initiative to expand voter registration among Black voters in the South. Felder's team partnered with local NAACP chapters, civic leagues, and churches to register 200,000 South Carolina voters in eighteen months, four times the number of Black voters (50,000) registered statewide prior to this registration drive.

In 1970, Felder and Isaac Samuel Levy Johnson ran for the South Carolina House of Representatives to represent Richland County as Democrats. Both defeated white incumbents to win their elections, while Herbert Fielding concurrently won a House seat in Charleston. These three men were the first African Americans to serve in the South Carolina Legislature since the Reconstruction era. Felder served one term in office through 1972.

In 1973, Felder was appointed to serve as the first African American assistant solicitor in South Carolina. He has worked as executive vice president of Operation PUSH, executive director of the South Carolina conference of the NAACP, and professor and business department chair at Allen University. He has taught at Benedict College and Voorhees College and received an honorary master of laws degree from Atlanta Law School and an honorary doctorate of humane letters from the College of Charleston. He has been inducted into the South Carolina Black Hall of Fame and the Clark Atlanta University Athletic Hall of Fame. As of 2017, he was continuing to serve as president of the South Carolina Voter Education Project.

Felder has authored four books, including the autobiographical I Buried John F. Kennedy (Lee Books, 1994), Civil Rights in South Carolina (The History Press, 2012), The Making of an AME Bishop (2016), and The Life and Times of Luns C. Richardson (2019).

He is married with two children and has lived in Columbia, South Carolina, since 1967.
