= A More Perfect Union =

"A more perfect Union" refers to a phrase in the preamble to the United States Constitution that begins with "in order to form". Toward a more perfect union is a related stock phrase in American political discourse.

A More Perfect Union may also refer to:

== Books ==
- A More Perfect Union: Advancing New American Rights, a 2001 book by Jesse Jackson, Jr.
- A More Perfect Union: What We the People Can Do to Reclaim Our Constitutional Liberties, a 2015 book Ben Carson (written with Candy Carson)
- A More Perfect Union: A Comedy, a 1960s typescript by Whitfield Cook (New York Public Library for the Performing Arts, Billy Rose Theatre Division)

== Film and television ==
- A More Perfect Union (film), 1989, depicting the writing of the Constitution of the US
- "A More Perfect Union", season 2 finale (2012) of Falling Skies
- "A More Perfect Union", season 4 episode (2013) of The Good Wife
- "A More Perfect Union", season 2 episode 13 (2015) of The Last Ship
- "A More Perfect Union" (Person of Interest), season 5 episode 6 (2016) of Person of Interest

== Music ==
- More Perfect Union (album), 1987, by Icon
- A More Perfect Union, a 2012 album by Pete Seeger and Lorre Wyatt
- "A More Perfect Union" (song), from the 2010 Titus Andronicus album The Monitor

== Other uses ==
- "A More Perfect Union" (speech), 2008, by Barack Obama
- More Perfect Union (media organization), an American progressive news media organization
- More Perfect, a spinoff podcast from WNYC's Radiolab

== See also ==
- Solemn Declaration on European Union, which refers to an "ever closer union among the peoples and Member States of the European Community"
