= 1995 United States House of Representatives elections =

1995 U.S. House of Representatives elections
- December 12, 1995

2 (out of 435) seats in the U.S. House of Representatives 218 seats needed for a majority
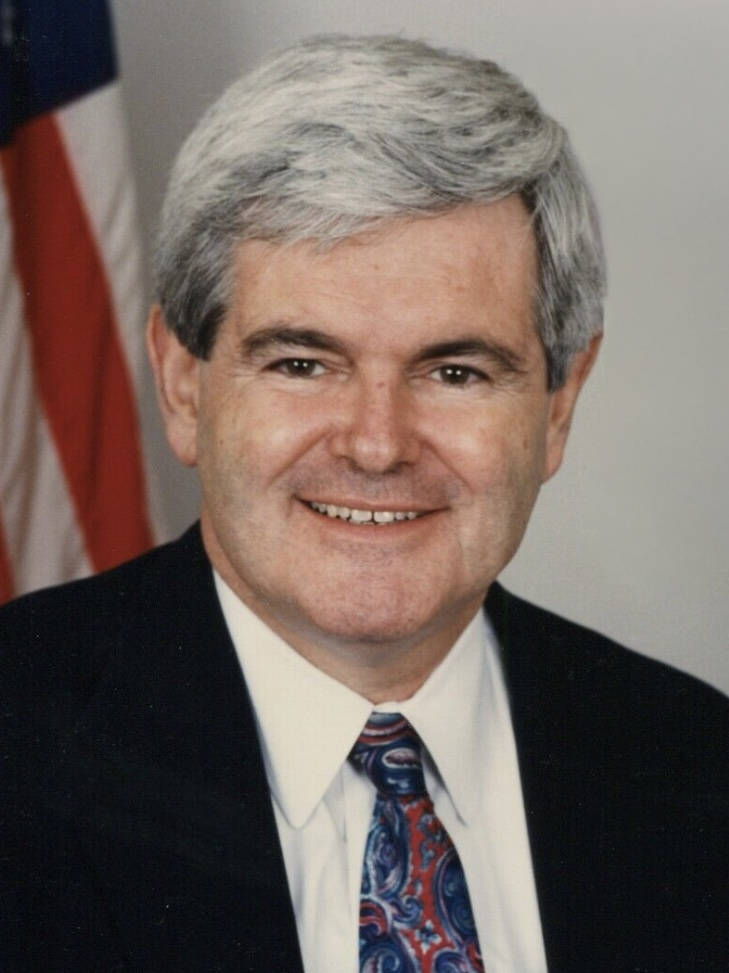

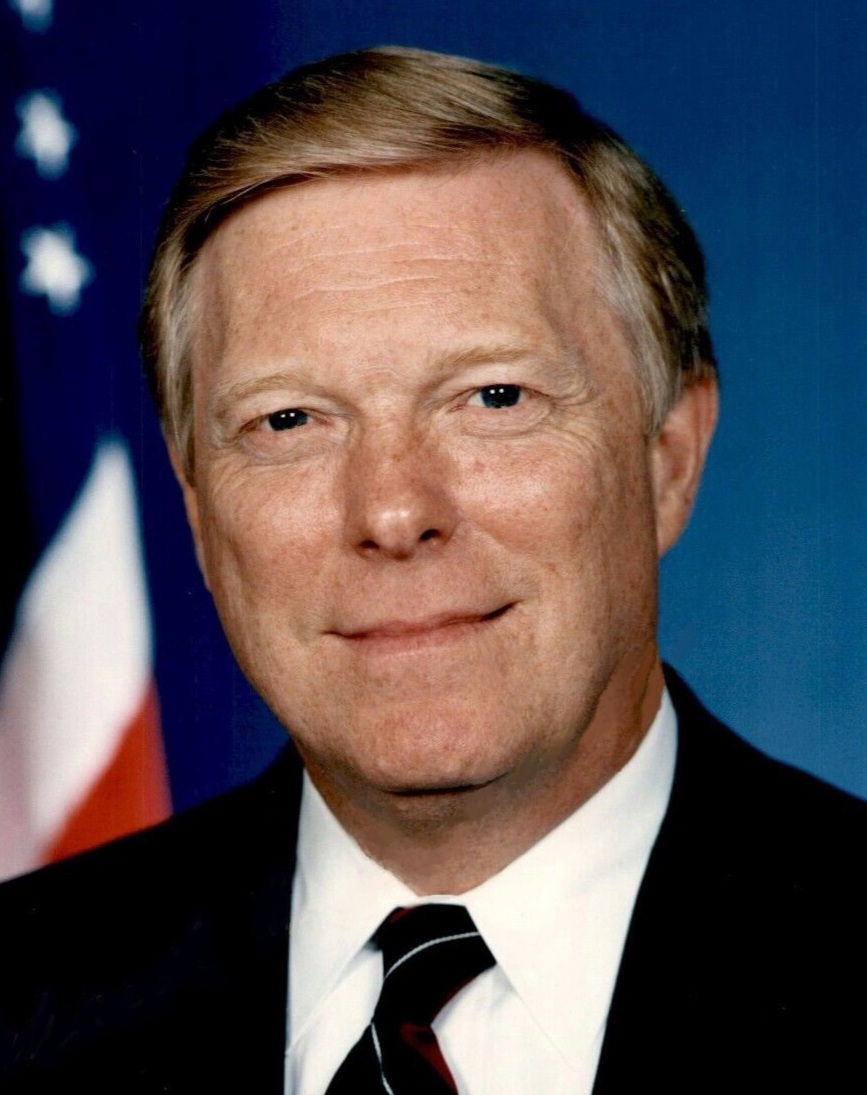
	Majority party	Minority party
Leader	Newt Gingrich	Dick Gephardt
Party	Republican	Democratic
Leader since	January 3, 1995	June 6, 1989
Leader's seat	Georgia 6th	Missouri 3rd
Last election	230 seats	204 seats
Seats won	231	203
Seat change	▲1	▼1

There were some special elections to the United States House of Representatives in 1995, during the 104th United States Congress.

== List of elections ==
District	Incumbent			This race	
District	Member	Party	First elected	Results	Candidates
California 15	Norman Mineta	Democratic	1974	Incumbent resigned October 10, 1995 to accept a position with Lockheed Martin. New member elected December 12, 1995. Republican gain.	▌ ✓ Tom Campbell (Republican) 58.9%; ▌ Jerry Estruth (Democratic) 35.8%; ▌ Linh Keiu Dao (Independent) 5.33%
Illinois 2	Mel Reynolds	Democratic	1992	Incumbent resigned October 1, 1995. New member elected December 12, 1995. Democratic hold.	▌ ✓ Jesse Jackson Jr. (Democratic) 74.2%; ▌Thomas Somer (Republican) 25.8%
