= 1995 Illinois's 2nd congressional district special election =

- December 12, 1995
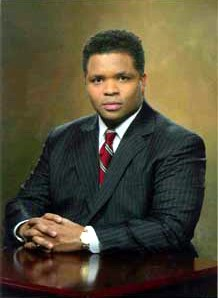

Nominee	Jesse Jackson Jr.	Thomas Somer
Party	Democratic	Republican
Popular vote	43,333	15,076
Percentage	74.2%	25.8%
U.S. Representative before election
Mel Reynolds
Democratic
Elected U.S. Representative
Jesse Jackson Jr.
Democratic

The congressional election in Illinois's 2nd congressional district on December 12, 1995, resulted in the entry to Congress of Jesse Jackson Jr. as a Democratic Party representative, a position he held until 2012.

The election was a special election made necessary by the resignation from Congress of Mel Reynolds. In the preceding Democratic Party primary held on November 29, Jackson defeated Emil Jones by a margin of 48% to 39%; there were three other candidates. In the general election, Jackson won 76% of the vote against 24% for the Republican candidate, Thomas Somer.

== Jackson's candidacy ==
Upon his election, Jackson announced his aspirations for his constituents: "I too have a dream...that one day the South Side of Chicago and the south suburbs will look like the North Side of Chicago and the northwest suburbs."

— Jackson, 1996

Jackson's wife Sandi envisioned Jackson running for the 2nd congressional district seat in the Spring 1996 primary election. His father, however, felt he should obtain experience at the local level as an alderman, Illinois State Senator or Illinois State Representative. Therefore, Jackson Sr. approached Alice J. Palmer with a deal where they supported her for Congress and she support Junior for her seat in the Illinois State Senate, but Jackson Jr. did not agree with that plan. He felt that if Patrick Kennedy was ready at age 26, then at age 30 he himself was ready. After seeking approval from former Democratic National Committee Chairman and Chicagoan David Wilhelm, he decided to run for the seat. Palmer ran and endorsed Barack Obama for her old seat.

When Mel Reynolds, who was later convicted on sex misconduct charges, announced his resignation from the Congress on September 1, 1995, Jackson's name was (along with Palmer) one of the first names to surface as a replacement. On September 10, 1995, Jackson officially announced his candidacy. Five Democrats, including Illinois State Senate minority leader Emil Jones, and four Republicans competed in the November 29, 1995 party primaries for the party nominations in the December 12, 1995 general election. Jones was endorsed by Chicago Mayor Richard M. Daley. In addition to Jones, Jackson's toughest competitor, the Democratic field included Illinois State Senator Alice Palmer, Illinois State Representative Monique Davis and businessman John Morrow. Jackson used a combination of multimedia, targeted marketing and an army of community activists to deliver his positive campaign messages. He also registered thousands of new voters. Jackson received no endorsements from the downtown daily newspapers (Chicago Tribune, Chicago Sun-Times, and the black daily, Chicago Defender), but was endorsed by the Citizen, Daily Southtown, Markham, Illinois mayor, Evans Miller, and one local labor organization.

== Jackson's campaign ==
As part of his campaign he was the only candidate to embrace the third Chicago airport proposal being championed by Jim Edgar at the time. The proposed airport in Peotone, Illinois was in Will County and was outside of the congressional district (which then was entirely contained in Cook County), but with thousands of jobs that would result nearby, his region would be a large beneficiary. Jackson estimates the airport could bring the region nearly a quarter million jobs and with the multiplier effect on the economy the region would benefit by a half million jobs.

One of Jackson's most lasting memories from his first election came during a bipartisan televised debate. During Jackson's positive campaign, he had emphasized that his district would be better off keeping Jones in office at the state capital in Springfield and sending Jackson to Washington. Jones said that being a politician took more than crowd pleasing and rhyming. At the time, the Chicago Bulls had just lost the popular B. J. Armstrong in the 1995 Expansion draft to the Toronto Raptors and Michael Jordan had recently returned to basketball from playing minor league baseball. Jackson memorably stated, "I am not running against Emil Jones. I am trying to build a stronger team. B.J. should have never been traded; M.J. should have stayed in basketball; E.J. should stay in Springfield; and J.J. should be sent to Congress."

== Democratic primary ==
November 29, 1995 Democratic Primary

Ward/Township	Jones	Palmer	Jackson	Davis	Morrow
6	12	8	33	4	1
7	1,254	684	2,486	112	13
9	2,444	360	3,044	149	14
10	386	141	367	14	3
15	294	151	783	25	3
16	57	11	124	11	1
17	1,256	306	2,729	141	13
18	1,376	312	2,398	167	3
19	225	70	280	16	0
21	2,490	414	3,432	336	4
34	4,973	460	4,911	248	12
City Totals	14,767	2,917	20,587	1,223	67
Bloom	1,596	757	1,231	39	54
Bremen	1,786	510	1,973	53	41
Calumet	990	111	502	19	6
Rich	1,352	914	1,479	38	30
Thornton	3,513	1,127	4,174	141	54
Worth	94	7	67	6	0
Suburban Totals	9,331	3,426	9,426	296	185
Overall Total	38,865	9,260	50,600	2,742	319

Jackson won the democratic party primary and since the district is overwhelmingly Democratic, he was the favorite for the special general election. The manner in which he won was interesting because although he lost two of the eleven city wards and three of the six townships, he won all the highest voter turnout regions (two largest townships and five largest wards) except the 34th ward, which was Jones' home base. The day after winning the primary, he received a congratulatory phone call from United States Vice President Al Gore who had also won his first election (representing Tennessee in the House of Representatives) in the shadow of his father, Albert Gore, Sr. who had represented Tennessee in Congress.

On the eve of the election, Gore attended a Jackson address. Jackson was campaigning in a district where his father was well known. During this campaign, his lone controversy was that his salary as field director the Rainbow Coalition had been subsidized by the Hotel Employees and Restaurant Employees International Union, which was accused by a Senate investigating committee of having ties to organized crime. Nothing ever came of those accusations.

== The special general election ==
Jackson won the general election of December 12, 1995 against Republican Thomas Somer (76 percent to 24 percent). The victory had been widely anticipated. Upon his victory, Jackson made it known he would be a liberal voice in opposition to Speaker of the House Newt Gingrich, and he was sworn in by Gingrich on December 15, 1995, before being introduced to the House by long-time Chicago congressman Sidney Yates. Jackson was perceived as less charismatic than his father and less credentialed than the Rhodes Scholar Reynolds, but his family pedigree was expected to help him open the doors that would enable him to serve the needs of his constituents effectively. In August 1996, Somer withdrew from a rematch leaving Jackson with no major party opposition. As a result, Jackson received 94% of the vote in the general election.

After being elected in the special general election, Jackson was one of many congressional politicians who received a donation from John Huang although Jackson did not know Mr. Huang. Jackson's donation was unexplained. Many recipients felt compelled to return the donations as a scandal erupted involving the true source of the funds. Eventually there was a Federal Bureau of Investigation and United States Department of Justice interrogation of Mr. Huang concerning irregularities which seemed to relate to Jackson and Bill Clinton. Mr. Huang's $1,000 contribution to Jackson's campaign was within legal limits and Jackson attributed Mr. Huang's desire to contribute to the national media attention his campaign's positive message received.
