= Monique D. Davis =

American educator and politician

Member of the Illinois House of Representatives from the 27th district
- In office February 2, 1987-January 6, 2017
- Preceded by: Howard B. Brookins Sr.
- Succeeded by: Justin Slaughter

Personal details
- Born: Monique Dionne McKay; August 19, 1936 (age 90) Chicago, Illinois, U.S.
- Party: Democratic
- Spouse: Robert Davis (m. 1960–1988)
- Children: Robert Davis Jr. Monique Davis
- Education: Calumet High School; Chicago State University
- Profession: Educator

Monique Dionne Davis (née McKay; born August 19, 1936) is an American educator and Democratic member of the Illinois House of Representatives, representing the 27th District since 1987 (elected on November 4, 1986). Born in Chicago, Illinois, she trained as and worked as a teacher and an educational administrator in the Chicago Public Schools system before entering politics. She graduated from Chicago State University. She is a member of Trinity United Church of Christ.

== Political career ==
In 1995, after the resignation of Mel Reynolds from the Congress of the United States, Davis was a candidate in the Democratic primary for the by-election. Although Davis received endorsements from previous seat holder Gus Savage and Nation of Islam leader Louis Farrakhan, Jesse Jackson was the eventual winner of the primary.

In 2003, Davis sponsored legislation which was signed into law and forced insurance companies that do business in Illinois to publish all records they have on historical insuring of slaves as property through the state's Department of Insurance. This made available a wealth of genealogical information to the descendants of slaves. Illinois became the second state to implement such a law, after California.

Davis and Illinois Senator Barack Obama co-sponsored a pair of successful bills in 2003. The first, House Bill 223, mandated that all police interrogations on homicide investigations be recorded. The bill was motivated by the release of thirteen suspects convicted of murder and sentenced to death who'd later been exonerated by DNA evidence. Previously interrogations could only be recorded with the suspect's permission. The second bill co-sponsored by the pair, Senate Bill 30, required police in Illinois to record the race of all people subjected to traffic stops, to provide information for efforts to eliminate racial profiling by police.

In 2004, Davis sponsored a bill to limit low-income household electricity or natural gas bills to no more than six percent of the household income. In 2005, Davis led the effort to secure funding for the Student Financial Assistance Outreach Center at Chicago State University when it was threatened with closure. Negotiations with Illinois Governor Rod Blagojevich over his proposed budget for 2006 led to an agreement to fund the center in exchange for Democratic support on the budget. The center received $300,000. In 2006, Davis was re-elected to the Illinois House of Representatives' 27th district after she ran unopposed for re-election.

In the 2007-2008 term, Davis served as chair of the Appropriations-General Services Committee, the vice-chair of the Elementary & Secondary Education Committee, the sub-co-chair of the Rapid Growth Districts & Special Education Issues Subcommittee and the sub-chair of the School Code Waivers, Elementary and Secondary Subcommittee. She was also a member of the Appropriations-Higher Education Committee, Committee of the Whole, Financial Institutions Committee, Public Utilities Committee and the Registration and Regulation Committee.

=== Comments on atheism ===
The Chicago Tribune reported on April 3, 2008 that Davis interrupted and criticized atheist activist Robert I. Sherman during his testimony before the House State Government Administration Committee in Springfield:

"I don't know what you have against God, but some of us don't have much against him. We look forward to him and his blessings ... I'm trying to understand the philosophy that you want to spread in the state of Illinois ... This is the land of Lincoln where people believe in God ... What you have to spew and spread is extremely dangerous ... It's dangerous for our children to even know that your philosophy exists ... Get out of that seat! You have no right to be here! We believe in something. You believe in destroying! You believe in destroying what this state was built upon."

Davis' remarks drew great controversy. For example, the Council for Secular Humanism said it was "appalled by Davis's apparent belief that atheists and other non-religious individuals are not entitled to the same rights and liberties as other citizens." A director said, "She is unfit to serve in her office, just as a representative who told a Jew or a Hindu to 'get out of that seat' would be unfit to serve. If she does not resign, the Illinois House has an obligation to expel her." That same night, MSNBC journalist and commentator Keith Olbermann, on his show Countdown, declared Davis the "Worst Person in the World," calling on Davis to either apologize or resign.

"Obviously, Assemblywoman Davis owes the witness and everybody in this country who believes in freedom of religion an apology. And if she can't figure that out, she should resign and take her prejudice with her. She also needs to improve her own education. That phrase, 'this is the Land of Lincoln, where people believe in God'; Miss Davis said that in Springfield, where, when Lincoln first ran for Congress in 1846, the future great president was accused by his opponent of being an atheist. You not only spat on the fundamental American freedom to embrace religion, a religion or no religion, Assemblywoman Davis, but you also made a damn fool of yourself in the process. State Representative Monique Davis, Democrat of Illinois, today's Worst Person in the World."

On Thursday, April 10, it was reported on Countdown with Keith Olbermann, that Representative Davis called him (Sherman) personally to apologize for her remarks, and that he accepted her apology. She stated that she was angry because of the shooting deaths of two students earlier that day.

=== Blagojevich Remarks ===
In August 2008, Blagojevich criticized Davis and nine other Chicago Democrats for, in his opinion, collecting dual salaries from the city of Chicago and from the state of Illinois as a lawmaker. Davis said she had retired from her education job three years previously.
