= A More Perfect Union: Advancing New American Rights =

Book by Jesse Jackson Jr.

A More Perfect Union
- Author: Jesse Jackson Jr. with Frank E. Watkins
- Language: English
- Subject: Political analysis
- Publisher: Welcome Rain Publishers
- Publication date: October 15, 2001 (paperback April 25, 2008)
- Publication place: United States
- Media type: Print (Hardcover)
- Pages: 420
- ISBN: 1-56649-186-X (Paperback ISBN 1-56649-294-7, ISBN 978-1-56649-186-0)
- OCLC: 48254349
- Preceded by: Legal Lynching: The Death Penalty and America's Future (2001) (with Jesse Jackson, Sr. and Bruce Shapiro)

A More Perfect Union: Advancing New American Rights or simply A More Perfect Union is non-fiction political analysis written by United States Congressman Jesse Jackson Jr. in collaboration with Frank E.Watkins. Watkins is a political theorist, activist and was the press secretary to Jackson at the time. It was released in hardcover format on October 15, 2001, and in paperback format on April 25, 2008. The material for Jackson's book, his third, came from three trips he took in 1997–98 to American Civil War battlefields. Although Watkins is credited, the biographical content of the book is written as a first person narrative as if written solely by Jackson.

The National Park Service has twenty-eight national Civil War historic sites. Jackson and White visited approximately twenty battlefields in August 1997, December 1997 and the spring of 1998. Jackson's wife, Sandi Jackson, participated in the third trip. The trips heightened a belief of Jackson's that race as it relates to African Americans has been the focal point of social and political existence in American history. Since Jackson is not the first to present such a realization, he presents a north–south schism lens through which to view the congressional politics of race.

The book contains about 75 pages of biographical/autobiographical content which provide context for the subsequent political analysis. Critical reviews do not analyze the biographical content. Instead, the reviews focus on the political analysis of race, economic issues, geographical divide, and states' rights as well as the constitutional amendments proposed in this book.

== Summary ==
We the People of the United States, in Order to form a more perfect Union, establish Justice, insure domestic Tranquility, provide for the common defence, promote the general Welfare, and secure the Blessings of Liberty to ourselves and our Posterity, do ordain and establish this Constitution for the United States of America. (emphasis added)

— United States Constitution, 1787

The title of the book comes from the Preamble to the United States Constitution. The preamble includes the phrase "in Order to form a more perfect Union" as the first specifically mentioned purpose of the United States Constitution.

The book has several sections. The first four chapters relate autobiographical details to his experience in touring the Civil War battle sites. In the subsequent section, he discusses federalism. In the third section he describes his economic plan. Then, Jackson outlines eight proposed constitutional amendments. In the final section, he discusses achieving these policy goals set forth in the third and fourth sections. On March 4, 2003, Jackson proposed these eight amendments. The book includes full chapters for each amendment. The eight amendments are as follows:

1. the right to public education of equal high quality;
2. the right to health care of equal high quality;
3. equal rights for women;
4. the right to decent, safe, sanitary and affordable housing;
5. the right to a clean, safe and sustainable environment;
6. the right ... to full employment and balanced economic growth;
7. the explicit fundamental right of citizens to vote; and
8. an amendment regarding taxing the people of the United States progressively.

The Education Amendment which reads "(1) All persons shall enjoy the right to a public education of equal high quality; and (2) The Congress shall have the power to enforce and implement this article by appropriate legislation," has received public attention for several years. Jackson feels that his amendment is a natural response to San Antonio Independent School District v. Rodriguez, 411 U.S. 1 (1973), which determined that an education is not a constitutionally protected fundamental right.

An important theme of the book is the north–south relationship as it influences the extent of federalism in the United States. The book describes how from before the Civil War to well after the Civil Rights Movement the balance of power between protectors of state's rights and defenders of the federal government have battled over resources and power along north–south alliances. Jackson is a detractor of state's rights and feels that the extensive power given to states has slowed our broad distribution of social goods by perpetuating inequality and thus unrest. Dyson also notes that Jackson attempts to bring class to the forefront of the discourse in an effort to offer a political vision toward social equity and equality. He says Jackson views race as the lens to optimally view American history and views economic issues as the hearing aid through which the politics of today can best be heard.

== Reviews ==
In a review for the Chicago Sun-Times, Michael Eric Dyson described the book as "intellectually accomplished and remarkably insightful". He views Jackson's eight new amendments as "the political backbone and intellectual infrastructure for the expression of a new politics of race and class that strengthen the status of all suffering Americans." He encourages understanding the book because it provides a fresh social perspective to addresses current fundamental American political and racial problems.

Writing for the Chicago Tribune, Playboy editor John Thomas described the amendments as sensible, but pointed out that some view them as an attempt to legislate policy decisions. Thomas perceived the benefit of the plan to be the fact that the force of the constitution would uphold the amendments, and that this would compel actions to support both political promises and the constitutional tenets.

At one stop on the book tour associated with the publication and release of the book at the David A. Clarke School of Law of the University of the District of Columbia, Jackson's message was perceived as saying that American history can be studied as an analysis of race, but that economics and the tension between states' rights and federal rights are the true basis of a domestic history revolving around pursuit of economic development, political power, and personal freedom. He then advanced the theory that these pursuits would most be most readily attained by adopting a set of new constitutional amendments, guaranteeing rights primarily grounded in the Universal Declaration of Human Rights, which the U.S. has ratified. Each is discussed in a separate chapter: the rights to quality health care, housing, education, a clean environment, fair taxes, full employment, equality for women, and the right to vote.

== Related issues ==
During the promotion of the book there was a controversy when a book-signing party in Dolton, Illinois morphed into a fundraiser without Jackson's knowledge. When Jackson realized what happened he wrote to the Federal Election Commission and the House Ethics Committee to explain what happened and seek their advice. Jackson decided to return the entire $1300 that was raised.

An outgrowth of Jackson's trip was the realization that the National Park Service does not represent the underlying issue of slavery contextually in its battlefield displays and presentations. Instead of presenting the battles as political and moral issues, Jackson felt racial context and relevance needed to be presented in a more forward way. As a result, in 2000, he recrafted the United States Department of the Interior's appropriation to include a directive to have United States Secretary of the Interior Bruce Babbitt use his influence over the superintendents of the national parks to encourage greater inclusion of slavery and social issues in Civil War presentations.

== See also ==
- Second Bill of Rights
- A More Perfect Constitution, a book by Larry Sabato
