= QSO (Person of Interest) =

- Person of Interest episode
- Episode no.: Season 5 Episode 7
- Directed by: Kate Woods
- Written by: Hillary Benefiel
- Cinematography by: David Insley
- Editing by: Lola Popovac
- Production code: 3J6006
- Original air date: May 24, 2016
- Running time: 43 minutes

Guest appearances
- Julian Ovenden as Jeremy Lambert; Scott Adsit as Max Greene; Abbi Snee as Brittany; Samantha Buck as Samaritan Doctor; Kushtrim Hoxha as Vasily Mikhaev

Episode chronology
| ← Previous "A More Perfect Union" | Next → "Reassortment" |

"QSO" is the seventh episode of the fifth season of the American television drama series Person of Interest. It is the 97th overall episode of the series and is written by Hilary Benefiel and directed by Kate Woods. It aired on CBS in the United States and on CTV in Canada on May 24, 2016, airing back-to-back with the follow-up episode "Reassortment".

The series revolves around a computer program for the federal government known as "The Machine" that is capable of collating all sources of information to predict terrorist acts and to identify people planning them. A team follows "irrelevant" crimes: lesser level of priority for the government. However, their security and safety is put in danger following the activation of a new program named Samaritan. In the episode, Root is tasked by the Machine to infiltrate a radio show to investigate a secret code sent through interference noises, which may lead her closer to Shaw. The title refers to "amateur radio contact", an exchange of information between two amateur radio stations. A contact is often referred to by the Q code QSO.

According to Nielsen Media Research, the episode was seen by an estimated 5.33 million household viewers and gained a 0.9/3 ratings share among adults aged 18–49. The episode received positive reviews from critics, who praised the writing and acting (particularly Acker, Shahi and Chapman).

== Plot ==
Fusco (Kevin Chapman) has been hospitalized after the incident at the demolition site. Root (Amy Acker) visits him and, remorseful for having him investigate the case, presents him with an exit strategy: fake IDs for Fusco and his son to escape if the situation worsens. As Reese (Jim Caviezel) and Finch (Michael Emerson) keep guard on Fusco, Root continues working.

Root grows frustrated with the missions she is sent on, and demands the Machine send her to find more about Shaw. The Machine directs her to a radio station: AM 520, WKCP. She is assigned as producer for Max Greene (Scott Adsit), host of "Mysterious Transmissions", a conspiracy theorist radio show. She listens as Max takes a phone call from a caller named Warren, concerning their discovery that interference noise on the show is being used to send coded messages. Later, Warren calls the show threatening to commit suicide, and Reese goes to his apartment to save him.

Despite that Warren is apparently talking to Max on the phone, Reese discovers he has been dead for hours. Reese and Root both conclude that Samaritan is involved and will kill Max for discovering the code. Root helps Max evade the hitmen sent to kill him. The team realizes the code is used to send orders from Samaritan to operatives at all of its facilities. Root realizes that the Machine assigned her there to send a message to Shaw.

Meanwhile, the simulations having failed to progress Shaw's (Sarah Shahi) brainwashing, Jeremy Lambert (Julian Ovenden) takes her on a walk through the hospital. Fed up with the simulations, she stubbornly refuses to try anything she is offered. She is tricked into killing a doctor in real life, thinking she is in another simulation.

Root uses an EMF meter to broadcast a message, which Shaw hears through a radio just as she is about to commit suicide. Despite being subdued again, Shaw gets a glimmer of hope at hearing from Root and starts preparing her escape. Root tries to bargain with Samaritan, surrendering in exchange for getting to Shaw's location, but Reese and Max arrive to rescue her before the deal is made. They escape and arrange for Max to live with a new ID. Max, however, refuses to leave after everything he has learned that day. Reese and Root reluctantly leave him behind, imploring him to just ignore the events of the day: he agrees to their terms.

After Fusco recovers, he is visited by Finch, who maintains his stance that keeping Fusco in the dark keeps him safe. Fusco points out that it isn't working, and quits the team.

Max reneges on his promise and reveals everything on air. Due to his conspiracy theorist persona, however, his audience does not take him seriously. Nevertheless, his secretary, tasked by Samaritan, poisons his drink and kills him. Finch is horrified by the Machine's mission, as it didn't take Max's life into account. Root later speaks with the Machine, thanking her for getting the message to Shaw. She then contacts one of the people she saved for a favor: to get her to the Žemaitija National Park for her next mission, which involves missile silos.

== Reception ==
=== Viewers ===
In its original American broadcast, "QSO" was seen by an estimated 5.33 million household viewers and gained a 0.9/3 ratings share among adults aged 18–49, according to Nielsen Media Research. This means that 0.9 percent of all households with televisions watched the episode, while 3 percent of all households watching television at that time watched it. This was a 3% decrease in viewership from the previous episode, which was watched by 5.49 million viewers with a 0.9/3 in the 18-49 demographics. With these ratings, Person of Interest was the second most watched show on CBS for the night, behind The Price Is Right Primetime Special, third on its timeslot and seventh for the night in the 18-49 demographics, behind The Real O'Neals, The Price Is Right Primetime Special, Fresh Off the Boat, The Flash, Dancing with the Stars, and The Voice.

With Live +7 DVR factored in, the episode was watched by 7.64 million viewers with a 1.3 in the 18-49 demographics.

=== Critical reviews ===
"QSO" received positive reviews from critics. Matt Fowler of IGN gave the episode a "great" 8.3 out of 10 rating and wrote in his verdict, "'QSO' ramped up the Samaritan conspiracy arc (secret coded messages?) while bringing Root a few big steps closer to Shaw. Meaning, Shaw was able to find a glimmer of hope during her darkest hour in captivity. This episode also gave us a nice single-chapter character in Max, who wasn't a number, but became a casualty of both circumstance and his own 'free will.'"

Alexa Planje of The A.V. Club gave the episode a "B+" grade and wrote, "Regardless of the episode's untapped comedic potential, the writers wring the drama from this story in typical Person of Interest fashion."

Chancellor Agard of Entertainment Weekly wrote, "Tonight we received a double dose of Person of Interest. The first episode, 'QSO,' was a Root-centric episode that finds her taking on a number that will lead her to Shaw, and it's definitely the better of the two."

Sean McKenna of TV Fanatic gave the episode a 4.4 star rating out of 5 and wrote "'QSO' and 'Reassortment' were solid episodes, and it's clear that things are ramping up to what should be a intense conclusion."
