= Jesse Jackson Jr. =

American politician (born 1965)

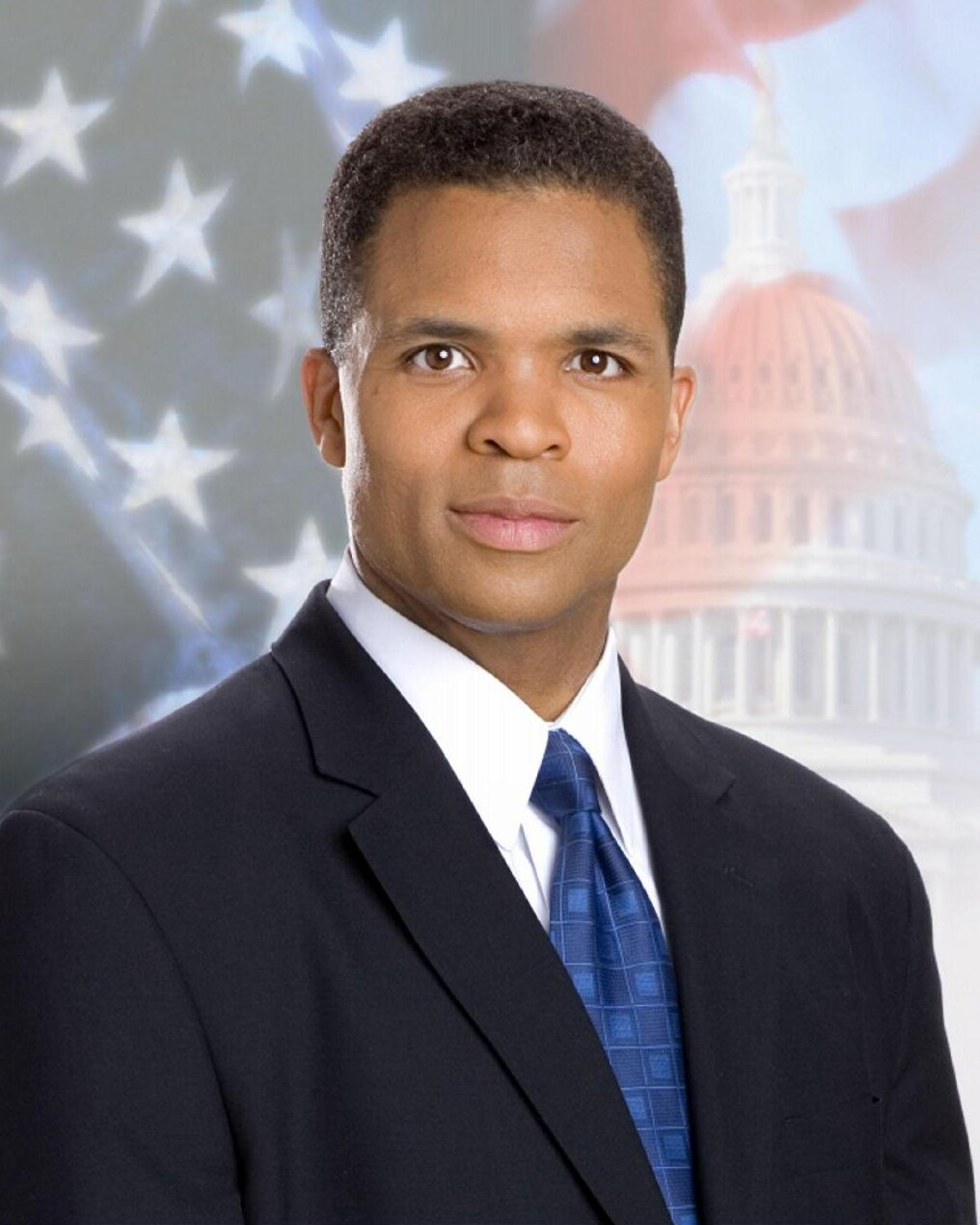
- Official portrait, c. 2007

Member of the U.S. House of Representatives from Illinois's 2nd district
- In office December 12, 1995 – November 21, 2012 (Note: Jackson's official service begins on the date of the special election, while he was not sworn in until December 14, 1995.)
- Preceded by: Mel Reynolds
- Succeeded by: Robin Kelly

Personal details
- Born: Jesse Louis Jackson Jr. March 11, 1965 (age 61) Greenville, South Carolina, U.S.
- Party: Democratic
- Spouse: Sandi Stevens (m. 1991; div. 2018)
- Children: 2
- Parent(s): Jesse Jackson (father); Jacqueline Brown (mother)
- Relatives: Santita Jackson (sister); Jonathan Jackson (brother)
- Education: North Carolina A&T State University (BS); Chicago Theological Seminary (MDiv); University of Illinois, Urbana-Champaign (JD)
- Criminal information
- Status: Released
- Criminal charges: Conspiracy to Steal Campaign Funds – Title 18, U.S.C., Sec. 371
- Penalty: 30 months in federal prison

Jesse Louis Jackson Jr. (born March 11, 1965) is an American former politician. A member of the Democratic Party, he served as the U.S. representative for Illinois's 2nd congressional district from 1995 until his resignation in 2012. Before entering Congress, Jackson was active in the Rainbow/PUSH Coalition and the Democratic National Committee. As a member of the House of Representatives, he served on the House Appropriations Committee and worked on a broad range of legislative issues.

In 2012, Jackson took a medical leave of absence and later resigned from Congress, citing bipolar II disorder and gastrointestinal problems. Following a federal investigation into his misuse of campaign funds, he pleaded guilty in 2013 to conspiracy to commit wire and mail fraud and was sentenced to 30 months in federal prison. He completed his prison sentence in 2015.

In 2024, supporters unsuccessfully sought a presidential pardon for Jackson. He sought to return to Congress in the 2026 Democratic primary for Illinois's 2nd congressional district, but was defeated by Donna Miller.

== Early life, education, and early political career ==
Jackson was raised in the Jackson Park Highlands District of the South Shore community area on the South Side of Chicago. He was one of five children of Jesse and Jacqueline (Brown) Jackson. He attended nursery school at the University of Chicago and attended John J. Pershing Elementary School. At age five, Jackson mimicked his father in a speech atop a milk crate at the Operation PUSH headquarters. His time with his father sometimes occurred in the time between political meetings.

He and his brother Jonathan were sent to Le Mans Academy in Rolling Prairie, Indiana after Jesse Jr. was diagnosed as hyperactive. As a young cadet, he was paddled at times for disciplinary reasons. During his tenure there, he earned the rank of Company Commander. Jackson repeated ninth grade and was suspended from school twice. Jackson graduated from St. Albans School. He was an all-state running back on his football team in high school and was featured in the February 1984 issue of Sports Illustrated as part of their Faces in the Crowd section, which noted him for his 15 touchdowns, 889 rushing yards, and 7.2 yards per carry in six games. Jackson enrolled in North Carolina A&T University, his father's alma mater, earning his Bachelor of Science degree magna cum laude in 1987. He decided to follow his father's advice to receive a seminary education at the Chicago Theological Seminary, where he earned his master's degree a year early but opted not to become ordained. Jackson proceeded to law school at the University of Illinois and convinced his future wife to transfer there from the Georgetown University Law Center. He then earned a Juris Doctor from the University of Illinois College of Law in 1993. Jackson never sat for the bar exam despite finishing his coursework a semester early.

As a teenager, Jackson and his brother Jonathan assisted in their father's civil rights activities. During the 1984 Democratic primaries, the three Jackson brothers sometimes appeared at events together in support of their father's presidential campaign. While in college, Jackson held a voter registration drive that registered 3,500 voters on a campus with 4,500 students. His first job after graduation was as an executive director for the Rainbow Coalition.

Jackson was again involved in his father's campaigning during the 1988 Democratic primaries. In 1988, in the dealings between his father and Michael Dukakis at the 1988 Democratic National Convention, Jackson's father obtained for him a position as an at-large member of the Democratic National Committee (DNC) by a nomination from Democratic Party chairman Paul Kirk. Jackson Jr. was the last of the five children to speak and introduced his father with the words "a man who fights against the odds, who lives against the odds, our dad, Jesse Jackson." At the time, in Time magazine, Margaret Carlson depicted the younger Jackson as a well-spoken and compelling personality who would likely carry any of his father's political aspirations that his father was unable to achieve himself. His experience with the DNC gave him the opportunity to work on numerous congressional election races. After the convention he also became a vice president of Operation PUSH.

Jackson was arrested on his twenty-first birthday in Washington, D.C., following his participation in demonstrations against apartheid at the South African Embassy. He had been arrested with his father and brother the year before in a similar activity. His protest against apartheid extended to weekly demonstrations in front of the South African Consulate in Chicago. Jackson shared the stage with Nelson Mandela when Mandela made his historic speech following his release from a 27-year imprisonment in Cape Town in February 1990. Before entering the House, he became secretary of the Democratic National Committee's Black Caucus, the national field director of the National Rainbow Coalition and a member of the Rainbow/PUSH Coalition. Jackson served as the national field director of the Rainbow Coalition from 1993 to 1995. Under Jackson's leadership, the Rainbow Coalition attempted to stimulate equitable hiring in the National Basketball Association because while 78% of the league's players were African American, 92% of the front-office executive positions, 88% of the administrative jobs, and 85% of the support positions were held by whites. While serving as the field director for the National Rainbow Coalition, he helped register millions of new voters through a newly instituted national non-partisan program. He also created a voter education program to teach citizens the importance of participating in the political process. He was a member of the Congressional Black Caucus, and also a founding board member of the Apollo Alliance.

== U.S. House of Representatives ==
=== Elections ===
Jackson's wife wanted him to run for the 2nd District Congressional seat in the 1996 primary election, while his father wanted him to run for a position as an alderman or for the Illinois General Assembly. The 2nd District includes part of Chicago's southeast suburbs known as the Southland and part of the South Side. Jackson's father approached state Sen. Alice J. Palmer with a deal in which the Jacksons would support her for Congress in exchange for her support for Jackson for the Illinois Senate. Jackson Jr. did not agree with the plan and wanted to run for the 2nd District seat. After seeking approval from former Democratic National Committee chairman David Wilhelm, he decided to run for the seat against Palmer. When Mel Reynolds, who was later convicted on sexual misconduct charges, resigned from Congress on September 1, 1995, Jackson's name surfaced as a potential replacement; on September 10, 1995, Jackson officially declared his candidacy. Jackson's opponents in the Democratic primary were Palmer, Emil Jones, Monique Davis, and John Morrow in the Democratic primary, which was set for November 29, 1995. Jones was endorsed by Chicago Mayor Richard M. Daley. Jackson was endorsed by the Daily Southtown, Markham Mayor Evans Miller, and one local labor organization. Campaign controversy arose when it was revealed that Jackson's salary as field director the Rainbow Coalition had been subsidized by the Hotel Employees and Restaurant Employees Union, which was accused by a U.S. Senate investigative committee of having ties to organized crime. Jackson was one of several Democrats who received campaign contributions from John Huang, a Democratic fundraiser who illegally funneled over $150,000 to Democratic candidates and was later convicted of conspiracy to commit campaign finance fraud. While most other recipients of the Huang-aggregated funds returned them or donated them elsewhere, Jackson kept the money, saying Huang's $1,000 contribution to his campaign was within legal limits.

Jackson won the Democratic primary with 48% of the vote to Jones's 39%, with the rest of the votes scattered among the other three candidates. The Republicans nominated Thomas Somer. Since the district was overwhelmingly Democratic, Jackson was the favorite for the December 12, 1995 special election. Jackson won the general election with 76% of the vote; his victory was widely anticipated. Upon his victory, Jackson made it known he would be a liberal voice in opposition to Speaker of the House of Representatives Newt Gingrich. He took office on December 15, 1995. Jackson was perceived as less charismatic than his father and less credentialed than his predecessor, but his family pedigree was expected to help him politically. In August 1996, Somer withdrew from a rematch leaving Jackson with no major party opposition in the November 1996 general election. As a result, Jackson received 94% of the vote in the general election.

As he prepared to run for president in 2000, Vice President Al Gore attempted to maintain good relations with the Jackson family, hoping to discourage Jackson's father from running for president against him. Jackson received a congratulatory call from Gore after his election in 1995. In 1998, Gore campaigned for and advised Jackson, and went out of his way to instruct aides to create a vice presidential event in Jackson's district to boost Jackson.

The 2nd District was overwhelmingly black when Jackson was first elected and remained so after the redistricting process following the 2000 Census. Jackson won re-election in 2000 by a 90–10 margin over Robert Gordon.

In 2001, the Federal Election Commission ruled that Jackson could hire his wife on his campaign payroll as long as she was paid no more than the fair market value for her services. In 2002, Jackson was challenged in the Democratic primary by three candidates. Jackson claimed that state Sen. William Shaw and his brother, Cook County Board of Review Commissioner Robert Shaw, had planted a bogus candidate in the primary race. The claim was that they selected 68-year-old retired Robbins truck driver, Jesse L. Jackson, as an opponent in order to confuse voters and derail the congressman's re-election campaign. Jackson asked a Cook County court to question the Shaws and others under oath, but his effort was rejected and no criminal wrongdoing was found. As Jackson prepared to take further legal action, Jesse L. Jackson withdrew his candidacy after the unexpected deaths of his wife and grandson.

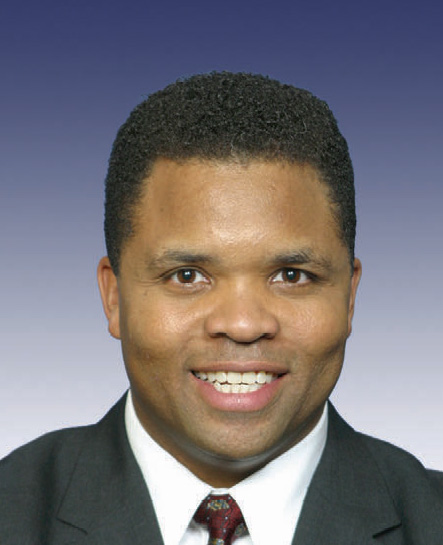
Jackson's official 109th Congressional portrait

Jackson won re-election in the 2004 House of Representatives elections by a wide margin over Stephanie Kennedy Sailor. In 2005, Jackson supported legislation that gave the United States Federal Court of Appeals jurisdiction over the Terri Schiavo case. In the 2006 election among Jackson's opponents was Libertarian Party candidate and African-American pastor Anthony Williams, an outspoken opponent of immigration. Jackson won with 85% of the vote.

=== Tenure ===
Jackson quickly built a track record of never missing a floor vote. Once he nearly missed his great-grandmother's funeral for a roll call, but the presiding officer was able to slightly delay the closing of the roll, thereby keeping his attendance record. Fellow Democrats said he debates and votes with a contentiousness that makes it difficult to view him as a team player. Jackson developed foes not only in the House, but also in Chicago against William Daley, who had a hand in several attempts to block Jackson's seating on the transportation committee he desired because of his support for a third Chicago airport. Jackson has also been a target of conservative media figures. Jackson established a heavily liberal voting record on both social and fiscal issues. During the 1990s, because of his name recognition and liberal track record, Jackson received many public speaking and media requests.

After being elected, Jackson attempted to parlay his popularity into a seat on the United States House Committee on Transportation and Infrastructure, using the leverage of his ability to perform voter registration drives. In the 1996 elections, Jackson began to rival his father as a requested visitor to congressional districts with 36 requests from congressional colleagues. He was typically sent on the "black circuit" without any notification to the press when he campaigned for other candidates. Jackson made 30 appearances for Democratic congressional candidates in 1998.

Jackson had some controversial interactions with Jewish leaders in his early years in office. In 1996, his message of unity and cooperation with the Jews was met with skepticism. In 1997, Jackson was criticized for offering mere disagreement with anti-Semitic remarks made by Louis Farrakhan while he was in New York City for the mayoral race; Jewish leaders were unsatisfied by Jackson's response to Farrakhan. In 1997, Newsweek mentioned Jackson in their list of 100 people to watch in the new century, dubbed "the Century Club", and raised the question of whether he would be the first black president. Jackson criticized the Bill Clinton administration for working with Republicans and voted in dissent on several notable bills that were the products of compromise between Democrats and Republicans. Jackson preferred direct aid and debt relief to trade reform as a method of helping impoverished nations such as those of sub-Saharan Africa and the Caribbean Basin, fearing that relaxed trade regulations would possibly benefit corporations and exploit labor. He is also an opponent of incentives for corporations to invest in developing nations. He was outspoken on issues of minority hiring in information technology. Jackson voted against the impeachment of Bill Clinton, voting against all four articles of impeachment considered by the House.

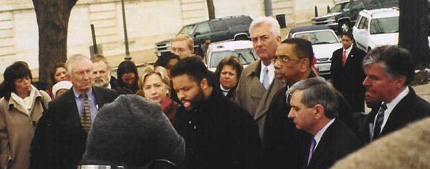
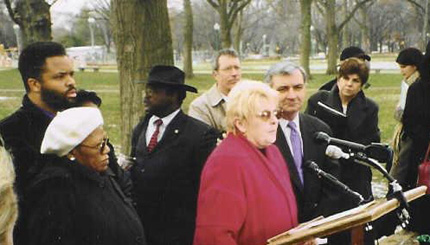
LIHEAP Day - January 8, 2003

In late 2000, as word spread that President-elect George W. Bush intended to appoint both Colin Powell, Condoleezza Rice and a third unnamed black to the United States Cabinet, Jackson sought to prevent blacks from supporting Bush as Bush planned to reach out to blacks. Jackson partnered with Republican Henry Hyde to push for a third Chicago airport. Jackson said Hyde was the right wing complement to his own left wing role in pursuing support for the airport. Jackson has withheld support for local Democrats who would not support the airport, such as 1998 Democratic gubernatorial nominee Glenn Poshard.

On January 6, 2001, Jackson and other members of the House of Representatives objected to counting the 25 electoral votes from Florida which George W. Bush narrowly won after a contentious recount. Because no senator joined his objection, the objection was dismissed by Vice President Al Gore, who was Bush's opponent in the 2000 presidential election.

In 2004, Jackson supported the Ho-Chunk tribe's proposal for a casino within his district in Lynwood, Illinois. The proposal was to build the largest casino in the state as part of an entertainment complex. In 2005, Jackson sponsored a bill for the creation and acquisition of a life-size statue of Rosa Parks to be placed in Statuary Hall at the United States Capitol. The bill approving the funding for the statue was signed by President Bush on December 1, 2005.

After the 2004 elections, Jackson became vocal in supporting election reform, disliking the way election rules differ across jurisdictions, saying that the U.S. "is founded on the constitutional foundation of 'states' rights'—50 states, 3,067 counties and 13,000 different election jurisdictions, all separate and unequal." He was one of the 31 House Democrats who voted to not count the 20 electoral votes from Ohio in the 2004 presidential election, despite Republican President George Bush winning the state by 118,457 votes. He also proposed legislation for uniform voting standards that was supported by black leaders.

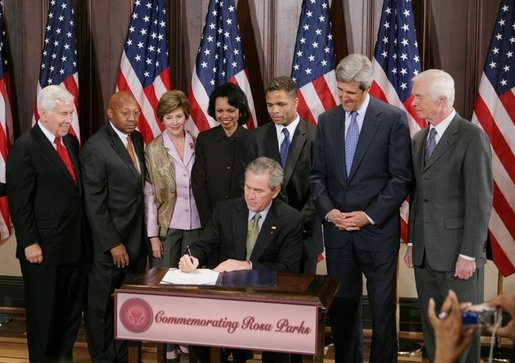
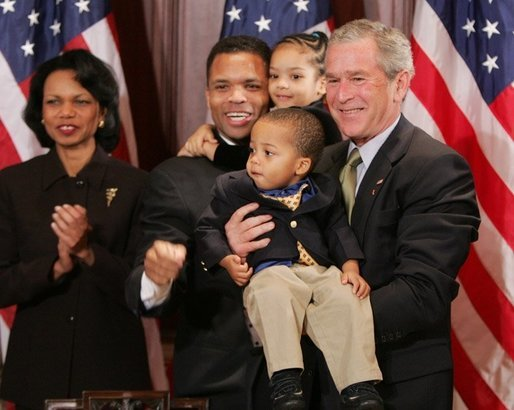
Left: United States President George W. Bush signing bill for Rosa Parks statue at Statuary Hall, (standing left to right) Richard Lugar, Alphonso Jackson, Laura Bush, Condoleezza Rice, Jackson, John Kerry, Thad Cochran; Right: Jackson, his children (Jesse III and Jessica), Bush, Rice (both images December 2005)

Jackson and Zach Wamp were spokespersons for the changing the name of the main hall of the United States Capitol Visitor Center from the Great Hall to Emancipation Hall. The Library of Congress's main hall was already designated Great Hall. Some had wanted further feedback on naming possibilities, but the United States House Committee on Appropriations approved the new name, and it passed the House.

Jackson was one of the liberal leaders who supported a fixed timetable for Iraq troop withdrawals. In 2007, he has also co-sponsored (along with Roy Blunt), legislation providing nearly $1 million to each family that lost someone to the al-Qaida activities in the 1998 United States embassy bombings. In 2007 Jackson voiced an interest in initiating impeachment proceedings against President Bush for "crimes against the Constitution of the United States."

In March 2011, Jackson attracted ridicule for a speech he made on the House floor proposing a constitutional amendment for "equal education rights", which he illustrated by proposing that every student in America receive an iPad from the federal government. In April 2011, Jackson spoke on the house floor, blaming the iPad for "eliminating thousands of American jobs." In the February 27, 2007 Chicago municipal elections, Jackson's wife, Sandi Jackson, won the election for Alderman in Chicago's 7th ward.

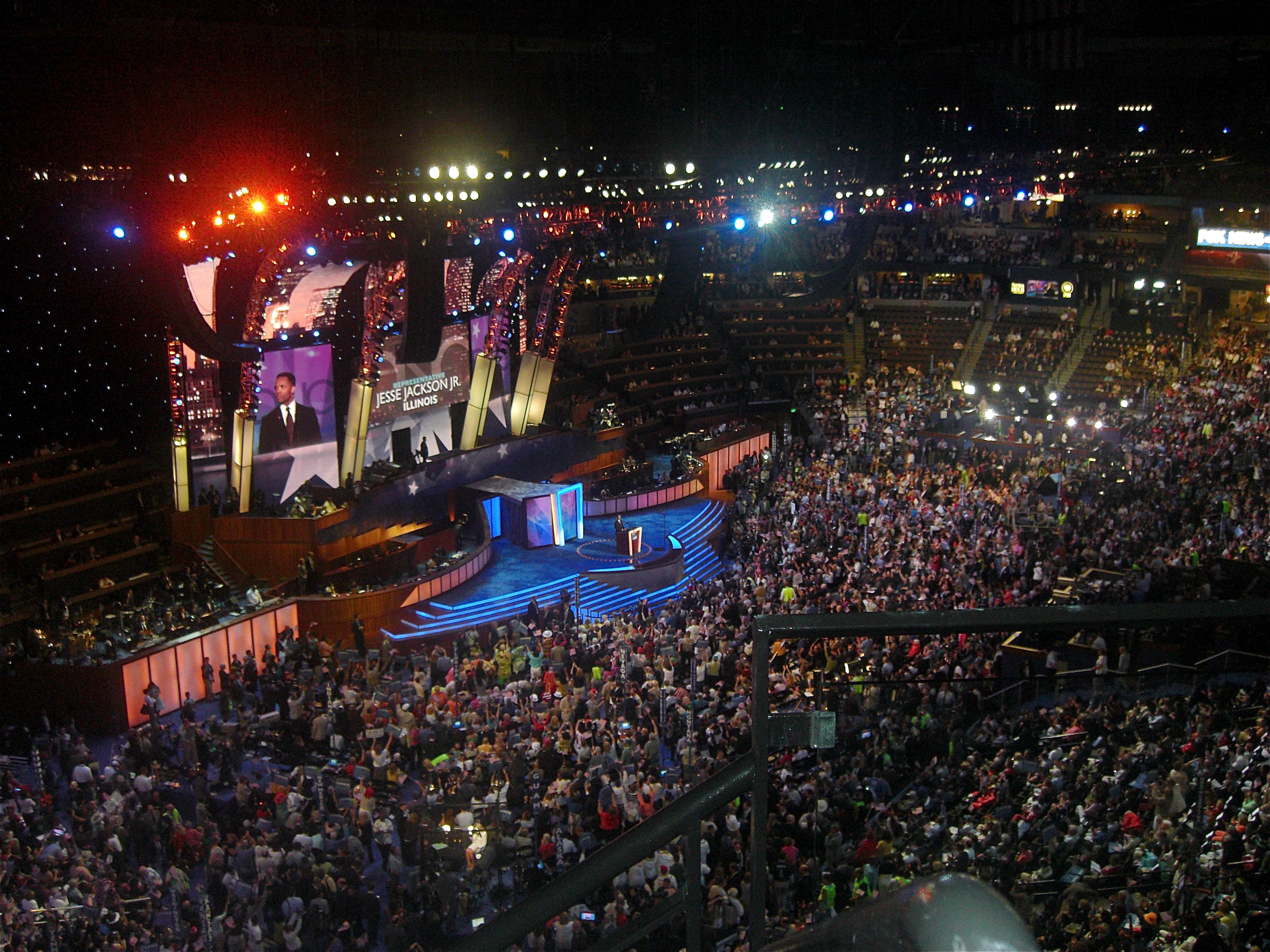
Jackson speaks on the first day of the 2008 Democratic National Convention in Denver, Colorado.

Jackson gave a prime-time speech at the 2008 Democratic National Convention on August 25, 2008. During his speech he referenced Martin Luther King Jr., stating, "I'm sure that Dr. King is looking down on us here in Denver noting this is the first political convention in history to take place within sight of a mountain top." Jackson said, "I know Barack Obama. I've seen his leadership at work. I've seen the difference he has made in the lives of people across Illinois." At the convention, Jackson started what was described as a "hugfest" in an attempt to unite the Illinois Democratic party, which had been squabbling internally. He started by hugging Bobby Rush (who had been upset that Jackson's wife was being positioned for Rush's seat when Rush had been ill earlier in the year) and then he hugged Debbie Halvorson, who had been at odds with him over the proposed airport. He then asked if anyone else was mad at him. At this point Mayor Daley jumped up to hug Jackson. Jackson then said, "I'm not going to be satisfied until I see Rod Blagojevich give Mike Madigan a hug."

Before the entire Congress was charged with mitigating the 2008 financial crisis and the Great Recession, Jackson proposed that the United States Department of Agriculture increase the allotment of food stamps. During the congressional debates on a federal bailout, Jackson worried about the viability of various plan iterations to his constituents. Although only two years earlier he spoke of Speaker of the United States House of Representatives Nancy Pelosi in glowing terms, he could not support the late-September version of the legislation she was proposing because he felt it contained inadequate homeowner protections. Although he voted against the bill on September 29, 2008, he voted in support of the Emergency Economic Stabilization Act of 2008 on October 3, 2008. He later expressed concerns in a New York Times op-ed article about the implications that the eventual bill had on enfranchisement due to the lack of protections for homeowners as it relates to voting rights. Jackson sponsored legislation to make the Pullman District a National Park Service jurisdiction. On April 21, 2012, Jackson held a symbolic groundbreaking for the proposed third airport.

==== Committee assignments ====
- Committee on Appropriations
  - Subcommittee on Labor, Health and Human Services, Education, and Related Agencies
  - Subcommittee on State, Foreign Operations, and Related Programs

Jackson was also appointed to the Abraham Lincoln Bicentennial Commission in 2003. He was among the scholars and politicians adding commentaries to Lincoln in Illinois which was published by the Abraham Lincoln Association and the Abraham Lincoln Presidential Library Foundation. The book had been expected in the fall but was published in June 2008.

=== Health issues ===
On June 10, 2012, Jackson took a medical leave of absence from the House, citing exhaustion. On July 11, 2012, Jackson's office said he was being treated for a mood disorder at a residential treatment facility. His office denied speculation that he was being treated for alcoholism. On August 13, 2012, it was confirmed by numerous news outlets that Jackson was being treated for bipolar disorder.

== Campaign fraud ==
In October 2012, federal prosecutors and FBI agents in Washington, D.C., investigated Jackson for alleged financial improprieties, including possible misuse of campaign funds. Sixteen days after being re-elected to another term, Jackson resigned effective on November 21, 2012, citing his health problems and acknowledging the ethics investigations.

Jackson and wife Sandi signed plea agreements in early February 2013. Jackson Jr. agreed to plead guilty to charges of fraud, conspiracy, making false statements, mail fraud, wire fraud, and criminal forfeiture—having used about $750,000 in campaign money for over 3000 personal purchases that included a Michael Jackson fedora and cashmere capes.

The Justice Department filed the charges on February 15, 2013, and Jackson pleaded guilty on February 20, 2013, to one count of wire and mail fraud in connection with his misuse of $750,000 of campaign funds. On June 7, 2013, federal prosecutors indicated that they sought a four-year prison sentence for Jackson. On August 14, 2013, Jackson was sentenced to 30 months in federal prison, while wife Sandi was sentenced to 12 months in prison for filing false tax returns in an attempt to conceal the crimes. Their sentences were not concurrent; Jackson served his, and after his release she served hers. The staggered sentences allowed for the Jackson children to have access to one parent during the time the other was in prison.

=== Prison and release ===
On October 26, 2013, Jackson reported to the Federal Correctional Complex in Butner, North Carolina, near Raleigh, to begin serving his sentence.

On March 26, 2015, Jackson was released from the minimum-security Federal Prison Camp, Montgomery in Montgomery, Alabama, to serve the rest of his sentence at a halfway house (the Volunteers of America Chesapeake facility in Baltimore, Maryland). After being released, Jackson was required to complete another three years on supervised release and perform 500 hours of community service. He was released in the morning of June 22, 2015, after spending three months serving his remaining sentence in a halfway house.

== Other political activities ==
=== 2000 presidential election ===
Jackson reluctantly supported Al Gore when he became the Democratic presidential nominee, saying Gore and his running mate Joe Lieberman were not liberal enough but that he supported Gore as the only alternative to George W. Bush. Jackson criticized Lieberman and the campaign for emphasizing the importance of personal morality in American politicians. Nevertheless, Jackson indicated he would persuade liberal voters unenthusiastic about Gore to support the Democratic ticket, rather than Green Party nominee Ralph Nader.

Despite his criticism of the Gore campaign, Jackson was still mentioned as a possible appointee for United States Secretary of Education if Gore was elected.

=== 2007 mayoral election ===
Jackson considered entering the 2007 Chicago mayoral election, challenging 18-year incumbent Richard M. Daley, pledging to make a decision after the 2006 United States House of Representatives elections On November 8, 2006, he announced that he would not seek the mayoralty.

=== Support for Barack Obama ===
Jackson was speculated as a potential candidate for the U.S. Senate in 2004, but declined to run and instead became one of Barack Obama's early supporters. He endorsed Howard Dean for the 2004 Democratic presidential nomination, joining Al Gore in saying Dean was the most likely candidate in the primary to beat Bush. The endorsement was a bitter blow to the hopes of candidate Al Sharpton, who had hoped for endorsements from both Jackson and his father.

Jackson was a national co-chairman of Barack Obama's 2008 presidential campaign. As such, he is involved in garnering support from the superdelegates. During the campaign, he provided the voice for some advertisements such as one South Carolina radio ad in which he said: "Once, South Carolina voted for my father, and sent a strong message to the nation, ... Next year, you can send more than a message. You can launch a president.'" When describing Obama, he stated that "Barack Obama is not speaking as a friend of the community; he's part of the community ... He doesn't always tell people what they want to hear. He tells them what they need to hear.'" During the campaign, he described Obama as the first "successor" of Martin Luther King Jr. to use the thoughtful and careful approach to language to frame social debate in a way that is unlikely to alienate whites and noted his ability to get various factions to agree with him and his political positions.

Jackson had a lengthy relationship with Obama. Obama's Illinois State Senate 13th district that he served from 1997 to 2005 was within Jackson's district. Jackson's sister Santita was a close friend of Michelle Obama and served as a bridesmaid at the Obama wedding. In 2008, Jackson's father, Jesse Jackson, wrote an op-ed in the Chicago Sun-Times attacking presidential candidate Obama for his lack of activist involvement; Jackson Junior responded sharply in the same paper with a defense of Obama.

On July 6, 2008, Jackson's father said he thought Obama talks down to black people, and unaware he was near a live microphone offhandedly commented that he would like to "cut [Obama's] nuts off". Jackson Junior quickly expressed his outrage at and disappointment in his father's "ugly rhetoric". Jackson's father said he was expressing his disappointment in Obama's Father's Day speech chastisement of Black fathers.

=== 2009 U.S. Senate seat ===
Jackson emerged as a possible candidate to replace Barack Obama, who, after being elected President of the United States on November 4, 2008, officially resigned his seat in the U.S. Senate effective November 16. The class 3 Illinois Senate seat was up for re-election in 2010. Other contenders included Danny Davis, Jan Schakowsky, Tammy Duckworth, Emil Jones Jr., Kwame Raoul, Dan Hynes, and Lisa Madigan, while other sources also mentioned Luis Gutierrez and Melissa Bean. One early name mentioned, Valerie Jarrett, withdrew her name from consideration and both Davis and Duckworth noted that they had not been contacted by the governor's office by the time Obama announced his resignation on November 13, 2008. In a radio interview on the subject, Jackson cited his record on federal funding for his district, loyalty to Obama and diligence in voting in the U.S. House. At the time, Obama was the only black U.S. Senator, and black leaders pressured Blagojevich to appoint a black successor. The Chicago Defender and Southtown Star both endorsed Jackson, who noted that public opinion polls show him as the favorite. The selection was coming at a time when the Governor's public approval ratings were at an all-time low, which added to the pressure for him to make a selection that would be good for his own political perception, and it was believed that Jackson's constituency was one that the Governor might need to appease. Although Obama and Duckworth laid a wreath together on Veterans Day, Obama did not endorse a successor. However, in an internal report filed by Obama legal advisor Greg Craig, "Obama authorized Emanuel to pass on the names of four people he considered to be highly qualified to take over his seat – Illinois Comptroller Dan Hynes, Illinois Veterans' Affairs Director Tammy Duckworth, Rep. Jan Schakowsky and Rep. Jesse Jackson Jr."

On November 27, 2008, Blagojevich hinted that Davis might be his choice. On December 6, the Chicago Tribune reported that Jackson was among the minority of potential candidates who had not been granted a meeting with Blagojevich on the subject, but two days later Blagojevich granted Jackson a meeting. On December 9, the day after a 90-minute meeting that Jackson described as his first meeting with Blagojevich in years, the Rod Blagojevich federal corruption scandal became public when the Governor was arrested. On December 10, Jackson was contacted by federal prosecutors for questioning with regard to the scandal involving Governor Blagojevich's search for a replacement. The press speculated that Jackson was "Senate Candidate #5", for whom it is alleged by Blagojevich that emissaries offered up to a million dollars in exchange for the appointment. Jackson, however, denies any wrongdoing, and says that the U.S. Attorney's office assured him that he is not a target of the investigation. In a press conference, his lawyer confirmed his belief that Jackson is candidate No. 5, but asserted that he has done nothing wrong. Immediately thereafter, in his own news conference, Jackson confirmed that he is a subject and not a target of the investigation and emphatically stated his opposition to "pay to play" politics. On December 16, a Jackson spokesperson confirmed special federal investigators have been questioning him since the summer. Also WLS-TV reported December 15 that Jackson has notified investigators that Blagojevich refused to appoint Sandi Jackson, his wife, as state lottery director because Jackson refused to donate $25,000 to the governor's campaign fund. Jackson spokesman Kenneth Edmonds clarified that although Jackson had been a federal informant for over a decade, never did his cooperation concern the current investigation into the Senate seat.

Although Blagojevich's corruption was reported to have been under federal investigation, journalist Howard Fineman of the Huffington Post allegedly has sources that claim Jackson attributes the Obama replacement case to Obama's neutral stance. According to Fineman's reported source, Jackson felt if Obama had endorsed him, Blagojevich would have selected Jackson. When the scandal first broke, the reaction was that Jackson's reputation was sullied to the point that his viability as a senatorial candidate was diminished. However, reports that Jackson has been a longtime federal information provider has led political allies to continue to speak of his viability as a candidate. After much controversy, Roland Burris was successfully nominated by Blagojevich.

In 2009, Jackson was named one of the 15 most corrupt members of Congress by the liberal Citizens for Responsibility and Ethics in Washington for his role in the scandal. On September 21, 2010, Jackson addressed a claim by businessman Raghuveer Nayak to the FBI that Jackson purchased plane tickets for a woman Nayak identified as a "social acquaintance" of Jackson, "The reference to a social acquaintance is a private and personal matter between me and my wife that was handled some time ago," Jackson said. "I ask that you respect our privacy."

In September 2010, fundraiser Nayak was mentioned in the press as having been an alleged go between for Jackson and Blagojevich with the message that Jackson would help Blagojevich raise $6 million in exchange for the Senate appointment. The allegations became the subject of a Congressional ethics investigation.

=== 2026 U.S. House election ===
On October 6, 2025, Jackson Jr. announced his intent to run for Illinois's 2nd congressional district seat in the 2026 election. The seat is vacant due to Robin Kelly opting to run for the U.S. Senate seat currently occupied by Dick Durbin, who is retiring at the end of his term. On March 17, 2026, Jackson lost to Donna Miller.

== Author ==
In December 1999, he co-authored It's About the Money: How You Can Get Out of Debt, Build Wealth, and Achieve Your Financial Dreams. The book is a self-help book with directions for achieving personal financial independence. The book is targeted toward people of limited means. In the fall of 2001, he co-authored Legal Lynching: The Death Penalty and America's Future, also known as Legal Lynching II. With coauthors, Rev. Jesse Jackson, Jackson Jr., and Bruce Shapiro, the anti-death penalty voice was heard very publicly. The book was published, at a time when public opposition to the death penalty was at a historically high level, by two of America's most prominent civil rights leaders. It was a follow-up to Legal Lynching: Racism, Injustice and the Death Penalty, which was released in 1996 by Jackson Sr. In 2001, Jackson Jr. authored A More Perfect Union: Advancing New American Rights, with his press secretary, Frank Watkins. The book outlines his moral and political philosophies, and it provides an autobiographical sketch. It provides analysis on the link between race and economics from colonial America to the present with a vision for the future. In addition to the analysis, it provides eight proposed constitutional amendments that Jackson sees as essential to pursuit of broader social and economic opportunity. Since the publication of this book, Jackson has refined these and formally proposed these constitutional amendments.

== Personal life ==
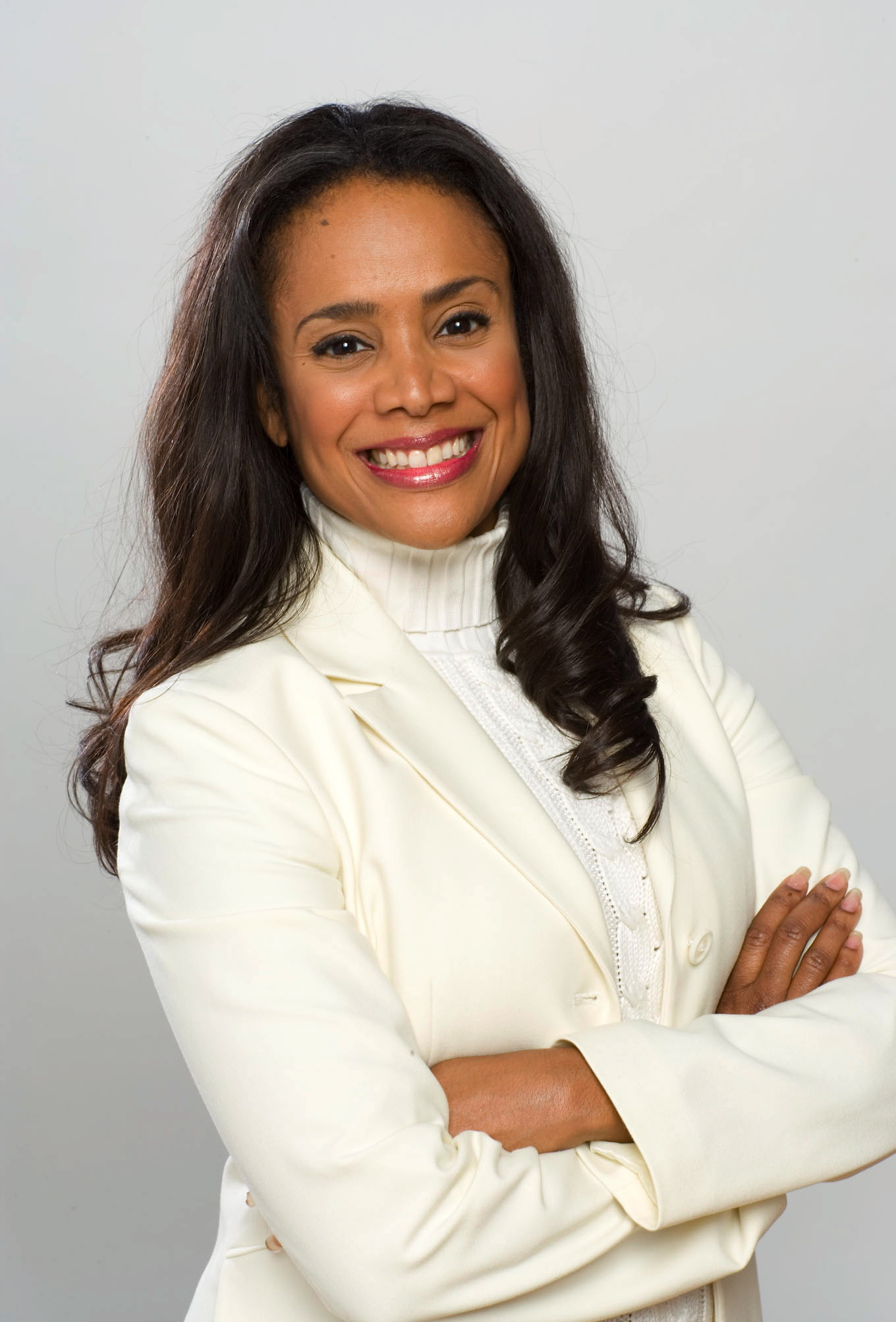
Jesse Jackson Jr.'s ex-wife, Sandi Jackson

During the 1988 presidential campaign, Jackson met his future wife, Sandi Stevens, who was press secretary for United States Congressman Mickey Leland. After her first year at Georgetown University Law Center, the couple decided public higher education was more affordable and jointly enrolled at the University of Illinois College of Law. While still law students, they married on June 1, 1991. Jackson and Sandi have two children, Jesse III ("Tre") and Jessica and keep two homes. They own one in the South Shore community area, which is within both the 2nd district that Congressman Jackson represented in the United States House of Representatives and within the seventh ward that his wife represented on the Chicago City Council as Alderman. The South Shore home serves as an election base for himself and candidates he has supported, for which he claims a 13–0 record in public elections. The South Shore home was the featured renovation on an HGTV Hidden Potential episode, first aired on March 24, 2009. The Jacksons also own a home in Dupont Circle in Washington, D.C., which served as the family home and base for his service in Congress.

Jackson's earliest public controversy came when he was linked to alleged Nigerian drug trafficker Pius Ailemen. Ailemen was supposed to be Jackson's best man at his 1991 wedding, but canceled at the last minute due to supposed passport-related issues. Jackson and Aileman were investigated by the FBI; the investigation and court proceedings extended for several years. A wiretap recorded many conversations between the two, and financial records indicate that Ailemen had purchased an Alfa Romeo using a $13,000 charge on Jackson's credit card. Ailemen was sentenced to 24 years and four months in jail. In 2003, Ailemen was denied petition for a writ of certiorari. Ailemen's current motion questions Jackson's activities as a government informant at the time of his testimony in Ailemen's trial.

Jackson acknowledges that he has had the benefits of privilege and opportunity and says that his hobbies include fencing, hunting and fishing, especially salmon fishing. He often enjoys these hobbies in bipartisan friendships that include Dick Armey and regarded the late Republican Representative Henry Hyde as one of his closest friends. In fact, Armey points to Jackson as an example of his ability to work with politicians at all ends of the political spectrum. Jackson also has a very good relationship with Republican United States President George W. Bush despite their sharp ideological differences. The relationship traces back to when Jackson Sr. and United States President-Elect George H. W. Bush met to discuss a range of issues while Jackson Jr. and his siblings Santita and Jonathan had an hour-and-a-half luncheon with future President George W. He also developed a relationship with Bill and Hillary Clinton that enabled him to watch Super Bowl XXXIII at Camp David with them.

In March 2005, Jackson revealed that he had lost 50 pounds (22.7 kg; 3.6 st) due to bariatric surgery. In Ebony, Joe Madison revealed that when he and Jackson were on a panel at the Congressional Black Caucus Foundation conference he asked Jackson why he looked so different. He stated that Jackson described having undergone a duodenal switch medical procedure that his sister, Santita, had used to lose 200 pounds (90.7 kg; 14.3 st) over several years.

Jackson is a member of the Omega Psi Phi fraternity. In 2006, when Jackson became a member of Omega Psi Phi fraternity, Nu Pi chapter, the Illinois House of Representatives issued a congratulatory resolution to his father. Jesse Sr. is also a member of the Omega fraternity. Jackson Jr. delivered the keynote address to the fraternity at the November 18, 2006 Founder's Day gathering. He is also affiliated with the Theta Epsilon chapter.

Jackson is a martial arts enthusiast who practices kung fu, tae kwon do, and karate. On August 1, 2007, Jackson got into a verbal disagreement with Representative Lee Terry, a Republican from Nebraska on the House floor. Jackson stated in floor debate that "Republicans can't be trusted" and Terry responded with "shut up" before approaching Jackson. Jackson then spoke profanities and challenged Terry to step outside, presumably for a physical fight. Steve Rothman helped avoid escalation to actual physical confrontation. Martial artists throughout the Omaha, Nebraska area (Terry's district) called to inquire about Jackson's mindset and intentions. Jackson says Terry was the instigator. Terry says Jackson was at fault, but the two shook hands the next day and agreed to move forward in the interest of their constituents. However, a week later an unidentified man who claimed to be a Jackson relative walked into Terry's Omaha office saying he was Jackson's hitman who had come to beat up Terry, which led to FBI involvement.

He used a battery-powered, GPS-equipped Segway in Washington. Jackson, who missed two votes in his first thirteen years in Congress, quipped that the Segway helped him to maintain his good voting record.

On July 12, 2012, Jackson's office acknowledged that he had been absent from Congress since June 10, stating that he was receiving "intensive medical treatment at a residential treatment facility for a mood disorder." After weeks of the public's not knowing where the Congressman was, his office announced on July 27, 2012, that he was at the Mayo Clinic in Rochester, Minnesota, undergoing an extensive inpatient evaluation for depression and for gastrointestinal issues. On August 13, 2012, the Mayo Clinic released a statement that Jackson was being treated for bipolar II disorder.

On July 14, 2016, Jackson filed for divorce from his wife in Cook County, Illinois. They reached a settlement in April 2018.

== Electoral history ==
Illinois Congressman results: 1995–2012
| Year | Democrat | Votes | Pct | Republican | Votes | Pct | Other | Votes | Pct |
|---|---|---|---|---|---|---|---|---|---|
| 1995 | Jesse Jackson Jr. | 43,333 | 74.2% | Thomas Somer | 15,076 | 25.8% | | | |
| 1996 | Jesse Jackson Jr. | 172,648 | 94.1% | | | | Frank Stratman (Libertarian) | 10,880 | 5.9% |
| 1998 | Jesse Jackson Jr. | 148,985 | 89.4% | Robert Gordon III | 16,075 | 9.6% | Matthew Beauchamp (L) | 1,608 | 1.0% |
| 2000 | Jesse Jackson Jr. | 175,995 | 89.8% | Robert Gordon III | 19,906 | 10.2% | | | |
| 2002 | Jesse Jackson Jr. | 151,443 | 82.3% | Doug Nelson | 32,567 | 17.7% | | | |
| 2004 | Jesse Jackson Jr. | 207,535 | 88.5% | | | | Stephanie Sailor (L) | 26,990 | 11.5% |
| 2006 | Jesse Jackson Jr. | 146,347 | 84.8% | Robert Belin | 20,395 | 11.8% | Anthony Williams (L) | 5,748 | 3.3% |
| 2008 | Jesse Jackson Jr. | 242,250 | 89.2% | Anthony W. Williams | 29,050 | 10.8% | | | |
| 2010 | Jesse Jackson Jr. | 150,666 | 80.5% | Isaac C. Hayes | 25,883 | 13.8% | Anthony W. Williams (Green) | 10,564 | 5.6% |
| 2012 | Jesse Jackson Jr. | 188,303 | 63.3% | Brian Woodworth | 69,115 | 23.2% | Marcus Lewis (Independent) | 40,006 | 13.4% |

== Published works ==
- Jackson, Jesse L. Jr., with Frank E. Watkins, A More Perfect Union: Advancing New American Rights, Welcome Rain Publishers: New York, 2001, ISBN 1-56649-186-X.

== See also ==
- List of African-American United States representatives
- List of American federal politicians convicted of crimes
- List of federal political scandals in the United States

U.S. House of Representatives
| Preceded by Mel Reynolds | Member of the U.S. House of Representatives from Illinois's 2nd congressional district 1995–2012 | Succeeded by Robin Kelly |
U.S. order of precedence (ceremonial)
| Preceded by Jerry Huckaby as Former U.S. Representative | Order of precedence of the United States as Former U.S. Representative | Succeeded by Dan Lipinski as Former U.S. Representative |
