= Reassortment (Person of Interest) =

- Person of Interest episode
- Episode no.: Season 5 Episode 8
- Directed by: Kenneth Fink
- Written by: Tony Camerino
- Cinematography by: David Insley
- Editing by: Ryan Malanaphy
- Production code: 3J6008
- Original air date: May 24, 2016
- Running time: 43 minutes

Guest appearances
- Julian Ovenden as Jeremy Lambert; Jenna Stern as Dr. Mason; Josh Close as Jeff Blackwell; LaChanze as Mona; Mark H. Dold as Garcia; Elena Shaddow as Ally; Kim Ramirez as Briggs; Enrico Colantoni as Carl Elias

Episode chronology
← Previous "QSO"	Next → "Sotto Voce"

"Reassortment" is the eighth episode of the fifth season of the American television drama series Person of Interest. It is the 98th overall episode of the series and is written by Tony Camerino and directed by Kenneth Fink. It aired on CBS in the United States and on CTV in Canada on May 24, 2016, airing back-to-back with the previous episode "QSO".

The series revolves around a computer program for the federal government known as "The Machine" that is capable of collating all sources of information to predict terrorist acts and to identify people planning them. A team follows "irrelevant" crimes: lesser level of priority for the government. However, their security and safety is put in danger following the activation of a new program named Samaritan. In the episode, the team is locked down in a hospital where Samaritan appears to unleash a virus on the population. Meanwhile, Shaw starts her escape plan from her captors. The title refers to "Reassortment", which is the mixing of the genetic material of a species into new combinations in different individuals.

According to Nielsen Media Research, the episode was seen by an estimated 4.92 million household viewers and gained a 0.9/3 ratings share among adults aged 18–49, which made it the least-viewed episode of the series. The episode received very positive reviews from critics, who praised the plot development, acting and ending.

== Plot ==
Shaw (Sarah Shahi) sedates her nurse and uses a tank to escape through the walls of the hospital while Jeremy Lambert (Julian Ovenden) alerts the operatives to find her. She uses the walls to escape to a nearby building: a prison and she realizes she is in Johannesburg.

Back in New York, Reese (Jim Caviezel) is following their new number: James Ko, a businessman. Ko feels ill and goes to a hospital, where a nurse gives him an anti-viral. However, his condition worsens, falls in the hallway, and is pronounced dead. The hospital decides to go into lockdown to find the cause of death but Finch (Michael Emerson) and Bear sneak in to help. Having abandoned the team, Fusco (Kevin Chapman) asks Elias (Enrico Colantoni) for help in investigating the events at the tunnel. Elias provides him with a truck delivery worker named Frank Capello that could be involved.

Ko's blood tests reveal that he had a combination of live flu virus with H5N1 and caused it to become contagious. As the virus starts spreading in the hospital, Root (Amy Acker) discovers that Samaritan is involved in the creation of the virus. Jeff Blackwell (Josh Close) has been contracted by Samaritan operative Mona (LaChanze) to get into the hospital just as the lockdown begins and is instructed to take two syringes with contaminated blood and inject two doctors in the hospital with it, which will kill them. He injects one of the doctors but Fusco, who arrives at the hospital, fights him and is injected with the syringe. Reese follows Blackwell but is unable to leave the hospital and Blackwell escapes.

Finch confronts the head of the hospital who was hired by Samaritan to destroy the anti-virals. Bear attacks the man and Root arrives with more anti-virals found by the Machine, saving everyone including Fusco. Despite this, Fusco decides to get reassigned with another partner in the precinct. Blackwell and his handler, Mona, discuss the quelled epidemic and declare it a success: the CDC is requiring everyone to be vaccinated, which will result in Samaritan learning everyone's DNA. Back in Johannesburg, Shaw escapes with the help of an inmate and is confronted by Lambert, who taunts her to convince her she is still in a simulation. Shaw responds by killing him and escaping in Lambert's vehicle to flee the prison. The car radio reports about the events currently happening in New York (confirming that all the things happening to her was real life).

== Reception ==
=== Viewers ===
In its original American broadcast, "Reassortment" was seen by an estimated 4.92 million household viewers and gained a 0.9/3 ratings share among adults aged 18–49, according to Nielsen Media Research. This means that 0.9 percent of all households with televisions watched the episode, while 3 percent of all households watching television at that time watched it. This was a 8% decrease in viewership from the previous episode, which was watched by 5.33 million viewers with a 0.9/3 in the 18-49 demographics. With these ratings, Person of Interest was the second most watched show on CBS for the night, behind The Price Is Right Primetime Special, third on its timeslot and seventh for the night in the 18-49 demographics, behind The Real O'Neals, The Price Is Right Primetime Special, Fresh Off the Boat, The Flash, Dancing with the Stars, and The Voice.

With Live +7 DVR factored in, the episode was watched by 7.22 million viewers with a 1.3 in the 18-49 demographics.

=== Critical reviews ===
"Reassortment" received very positive reviews from critics. Matt Fowler of IGN gave the episode a "great" 8.6 out of 10 rating and wrote in his verdict, "In 'Reassortment,' Jeff Blackwell discovered the reason he was chosen by his new employers and embarked on a mission that led him down an even darker path. All while Shaw escaped from Samaritan’s South African prison, hell-bent on returning to Root. I don't know what Samaritan's up to, with regards to the next great purge/filter headed humanity's way, but I liked the idea that we may be inching closer to that dreaded 'to save humanity, it must destroy humanity' ASI doomsday scenario."

Alexa Planje of The A.V. Club gave the episode an "A−" grade and wrote, "'Reassortment' pairs an A-plot about a deadly viral outbreak with a B-plot that involves Shaw breaking out of prison. Thankfully, much more lies beneath the surface of these simple plot descriptions. Numerous strands of plot intertwine, actually, and the fact that they're tied together thematically results in a rich episode."

Chancellor Agard of Entertainment Weekly wrote, "In the second hour, 'Reassortment,' Team Machine deals with a deadly viral outbreak at a hospital that ultimately leads to the fracturing of the team. These episodes went pretty well together, and I was rather satisfied with where we left things at the end of 'Reassortment.'"

Sean McKenna of TV Fanatic gave the episode a 4.4 star rating out of 5 and wrote "'QSO' and 'Reassortment' were solid episodes, and it's clear that things are ramping up to what should be a intense conclusion."
