= Solemn Declaration on European Union =

1983 European Union treaty

The Solemn Declaration on European Union was signed by the then 10 heads of state and government on Sunday 19 June 1983, at the Stuttgart European Council held in Stuttgart.

In November 1981, the German and Italian Governments submitted to the Member States a draft European Act designed to further European integration. In accordance with the mandate given by the European Council of 26 and 27 November 1981 the Foreign Ministers reported to the Stuttgart European Council on their work on this draft Act.

The Heads of State or Government of the Member States of the European Communities meeting within the European Council resolved to continue the work begun on the basis of the Treaties of Paris and Rome and to create a united Europe, which is more than ever necessary in order to meet the dangers of the world situation, capable of assuming the responsibilities incumbent on it by virtue of its political role, its economic potential and its manifold links with other peoples, ...

The Heads of State or Government, on the basis of an awareness of a common destiny and the wish to affirm the European identity, confirm their commitment to progress towards an ever closer union among the peoples and Member States of the European Community.

The declaration was one of the milestones leading to the formation of the European Single Market in 1993.

The Stuttgart European Council also used the occasion to condemn international interference with the conflicts in Central America, specifically in El Salvador and Nicaragua. Their statement concerning this issue reads:

The Heads of State and Government confirmed their close interest in developments in Central America. They are deeply concerned at the economic and social conditions in many parts of the region, at the tensions which these create and at the widespread misery and bloodshed.

They are convinced that the problems of Central America cannot be solved by military means, but only by a political solution springing from the region itself and respecting the principles of non-interference and inviolability of frontiers. They, therefore, fully support the current initiative of the Contadora Group. They underlined the need for the establishment of democratic conditions and for the strict observance of human rights throughout the region.

They are ready to continue contributing to the further development in the area, in order to promote progress towards stability.
