= Jackson Park Highlands District =

Historic district in Chicago, Illinois

Coordinates: 41.770°N 87.579°W

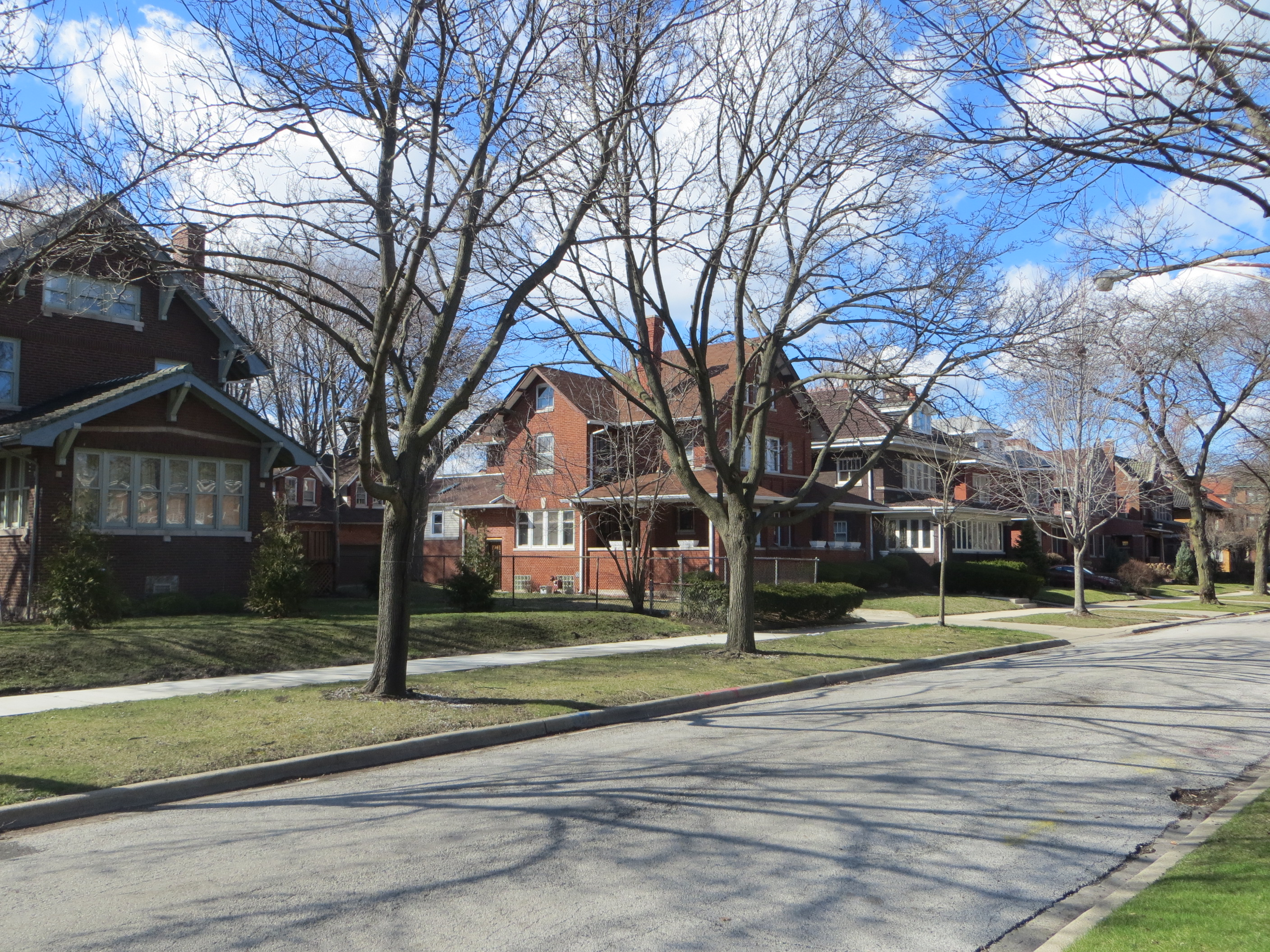
A home within the district

The Jackson Park Highlands District is a historic district in the South Shore community area of Chicago. The district was built in 1905 by various architects. It was designated a Chicago Landmark on October 25, 1989.

== Boundaries ==
The neighborhood is roughly bounded by 67th Street to the north, 71st Street to the south, Cregier Avenue to the west, and Jeffery Boulevard to the east. Directly north of the neighborhood lies the 18-hole Jackson Park Golf Course, a part of the Chicago Park District's Jackson Park, the third largest park in the city and home of the World's Columbian Exposition, 1893. To the south lies the former Illinois Central Electric tracks, now operated by Metra Electric. The Jackson Park Highlands District is surrounded on the west, south, and east by the South Shore community area.

== History ==
The neighborhood was established in 1905. Its initial purpose was as a collection of model homes that would overlook the prized Jackson Park, which had hosted the World's Fair less than a decade prior. The neighborhood featured (and is still present) some of the most innovative concepts of the time, including large front yard setbacks, 50-foot lot widths, underground utilities, and no alleys. When Chicago annexed Hyde Park just in time for the 1890 census (to beat out Philadelphia as the second largest metro-area in the nation), the Highlands were left under governorship of the South Shore area.

At the time of World War II, the neighborhood saw huge loss in residence and a destruction of the area was suggested. With the arrival of the 1970s, the neighborhood again began to rise as a major thoroughfare of South Side luxury. House prices now range from about $300,000 to $1.5 million.

== Notable people ==
- Bo Diddley
- Enrico Fermi
- Jesse Jackson
- Ramsey Lewis
- David Mamet
- Gale Sayers
