= A More Perfect Union (Person of Interest) =

- Person of Interest episode
- Episode no.: Season 5 Episode 6
- Directed by: Alrick Riley
- Written by: Melissa Scrivner Love
- Cinematography by: David Insley
- Editing by: Ryan Malanaphy
- Production code: 3J6005
- Original air date: May 23, 2016
- Running time: 43 minutes

Guest appearances
- John Nolan as John Greer; James LeGros as Bruce Moran; Oakes Fegley as Gabriel Hayward; Christina Bennett Lind as Karen Turner; Purva Bedi as Maggie; Daniel Abeles as Will O'Brien

Episode chronology
← Previous "ShotSeeker"	Next → "QSO"

"A More Perfect Union" is the sixth episode of the fifth season of the American television drama series Person of Interest. It is the 96th overall episode of the series and is written by co-executive producer Melissa Scrivner Love and directed by Alrick Riley. It aired on CBS in the United States and on CTV in Canada on May 23, 2016.

The series revolves around a computer program for the federal government known as "The Machine" that is capable of collating all sources of information to predict terrorist acts and to identify people planning them. A team follows "irrelevant" crimes: lesser level of priority for the government. However, their security and safety is put in danger following the activation of a new program named Samaritan. In the episode, the team crashes a wedding to investigate a possible rivalry that could result in tragedy. Meanwhile, Greer tries to convince Shaw to re-evaluate her allegiances while Fusco investigates a project related to missing people. The title refers to "A more perfect union", a phrase in the preamble to the United States Constitution.

According to Nielsen Media Research, the episode was seen by an estimated 5.49 million household viewers and gained a 0.9/3 ratings share among adults aged 18–49. The episode received generally positive reviews from critics, who praised the humor and Fusco's and Shaw's storylines while the main case received more criticism.

== Plot ==
The Machine has produced a new number, which actually belongs to a marriage license. It belongs to the upcoming wedding of Phoebe Turner and Will O'Brien. Reese (Jim Caviezel) infiltrates Phoebe's bachelorette party, attracting the attention of her sister Janna. Suspecting that a family rivalry could unleash disastrous events, Reese and Finch (Michael Emerson) crash the wedding to find out more. Finch leaves Root (Amy Acker) in charge of the Machine and the subway station.

Root approaches Fusco (Kevin Chapman) about helping her with a new number: Howard Carpenter, a city planner. Samaritan has now begun to track Fusco, having previously labeled him a "potential obstructionist", which forces Fusco to work indoors in a secret case revolving around missing people targeted by Samaritan. Fusco follows Carpenter and catches him meeting with Bruce Moran (James LeGros), who seems to be caught up in a Samaritan-engineered interference with a demolition project. Howard then disappears, joining Fusco's secret investigation list. Fusco and Bear arrive at the eventual demolition site, finding many of the missing persons he has been investigating, including Krupa and a dead Moran and Howard. He tries to contact Finch, but is caught in the demolition, which is just starting.

Back at the wedding, what starts as a simple suspicion of rivalry soon escalates as the team finds that there are hitmen at the wedding, who are quickly dispatched by Reese and Root, who crashed the wedding as a caterer. They initially deduce Phoebe's father used drugs on his horses to win races, but it's actually Phoebe's sister, Karen (Christina Bennett Lind), who plans to kill a journalist named Maggie (Purva Bedi), who was in attendance at the wedding. Reese and Root save Maggie without interfering with the wedding plans and avoid chaos. Root then confides in Finch that she attended the wedding out of loneliness and reveals she knows about the outcome simulator.

After failing to advance more in the simulations, Greer (John Nolan) takes Shaw (Sarah Shahi) to a field day in some places in the area to convince her to bend her moral compass in favor of Samaritan. Desperate, Greer takes Shaw to meet Gabriel (Oakes Fegley), Samaritan's analog interface, who gives an apocalyptic depiction of what Samaritan is capable of, defending his actions as saving humanity from itself. It's then revealed that the events are not a simulation, but a manipulation of Shaw's thoughts and neurological activity.

== Reception ==
=== Viewers ===
In its original American broadcast, "A More Perfect Union" was seen by an estimated 5.49 million household viewers and gained a 0.9/3 ratings share among adults aged 18–49, according to Nielsen Media Research. This means that 0.9 percent of all households with televisions watched the episode, while 3 percent of all households watching television at that time watched it. This was a 22% decrease in viewership from the previous episode, which was watched by 6.97 million viewers with a 1.1/4 in the 18-49 demographics. With these ratings, Person of Interest was the third most watched show on CBS for the night, behind The Odd Couple and The Price Is Right Primetime Special, third on its timeslot and eighth for the night in the 18-49 demographics, behind The Odd Couple, Gotham, Blindspot, The Price Is Right Primetime Special, Dancing with the Stars, The Bachelorette, and The Voice.

With Live +7 DVR factored in, the episode was watched by 7.92 million viewers with a 1.4 in the 18-49 demographics.

=== Critical reviews ===
"A More Perfect Union" received generally positive reviews from critics. Matt Fowler of IGN gave the episode a "great" 8 out of 10 rating and wrote in his verdict, "The most interesting stuff in 'A More Perfect Union' was happening on the outskirts, with Fusco and Shaw, and not within the weekly case. Which was a fun-but-disposable (possibly) final hurrah for basic number jobs."

Alexa Planje of The A.V. Club gave the episode a "B" grade and wrote, "'A More Perfect Union' is a really goofy episode of Person of Interest. The case of the week could've appeared on many other shows, and lesser ones at that. Let's reflect on the ending, shall we?"

Chancellor Agard of Entertainment Weekly wrote, "While I didn't quite like this episode, it was still a good example of the hard work the show put into developing its main cast and how that's paying off right now."

Sean McKenna of TV Fanatic gave the episode a 4.3 star rating out of 5 and wrote "OK, so their nuptial adventure had more fighting off hitmen than avoiding stage five clingers, but there were still some humorous moments on 'A More Perfect Union'."
