= Gus Savage =

American politician (1925–2015)

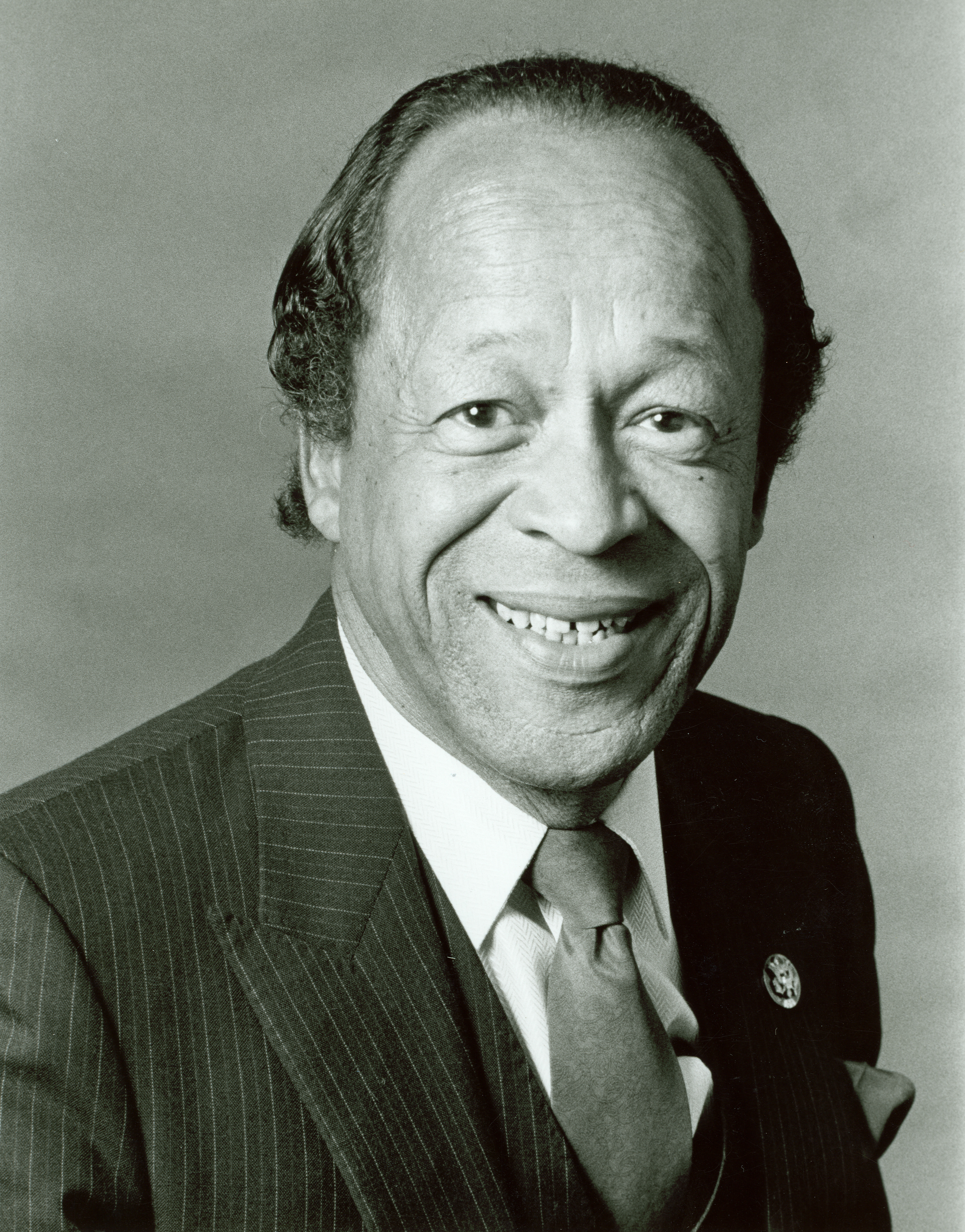

Member of the U.S. House of Representatives from Illinois's 2nd district
- In office January 3, 1981 – January 3, 1993
- Preceded by: Morgan F. Murphy
- Succeeded by: Mel Reynolds

Personal details
- Born: Augustus Alexander Savage; October 30, 1925 Detroit, Michigan U.S.
- Died: October 31, 2015 (aged 90) Olympia Fields, Illinois, U.S.
- Party: Democratic
- Spouse: Eunice King (m. 1946; died 1981)
- Children: Thomas James, Emma Mae
- Education: Roosevelt University; Chicago-Kent College of Law

Military service
- Branch/service: United States Army
- Years of service: 1943–1946

Augustus Alexander "Gus" Savage (October 30, 1925 – October 31, 2015) was an American entrepreneur, publisher and a Democratic member of the United States House of Representatives from Illinois. He served six terms from 1981 to 1993.

== Early life and career ==
Savage was born in Detroit, Michigan, and graduated from Roosevelt University in Chicago. He served in the United States Army from 1943 to 1946 and then worked as a journalist from 1954 to 1979, owning a chain of weekly community newspapers in the Chicago area including the South End Citizen. The Chicago Citizen Newspaper Group became the largest Black-owned chain of weekly newspapers in the Midwest with a circulation of 121,000.

== Congress ==
Savage entered political life in 1948 as a Progressive Party organizer.

He challenged the local establishment's chosen candidates for the House of Representatives in 1968 and 1970, losing the Democratic primary both times. He won election to the House in 1980, representing the 2nd District on Chicago's South Side for six terms, from January 1981 to January 1993.

In 1983, he joined with seven other Congressional Representatives to sponsor a resolution to impeach Ronald Reagan over his sudden and unexpected invasion of Grenada.

=== Controversies ===
In 1989, Savage was accused of trying to force himself on a female Peace Corps worker in Zaire. He denied the allegations and blamed them on the "racist press." The House Ethics Committee decided that the events did indeed occur, but it did not take disciplinary action only because Savage wrote a letter of apology.

Savage had long been controversial even in his own district. His racially incendiary and anti-Semitic remarks frequently drew bipartisan criticism. He never won a primary election–the real contest in this overwhelmingly Democratic district–with more than 52% of the vote, and usually faced multiple challengers.

=== Redistricting and defeat ===
For the 1992 election, redistricting pushed his district further into Chicago's south suburbs, territory that Savage did not know and that did not know him. He faced a rematch with Mel Reynolds, who had challenged him in the 1988 and 1990 primaries. Savage claimed that "racist Jews" were donating to Reynolds, while Reynolds claimed that Savage was involved in a drive-by shooting that injured him. Although Savage accused Reynolds of staging the shooting, he lost the 1992 election to Reynolds by a margin of 63%-37% after voters in the suburban portion of the district voted 4-to-1 for Reynolds. In defeat Savage declared, "We have lost to the white racist press and to the racist reactionary Jewish misleaders."

=== Role in national historic landmark ===
In one of his final acts as chairman of the House Subcommittee on Public Buildings and Grounds, excavation and construction at the site of the African Burial Ground in New York City was temporarily halted in 1992, pending further evaluation by the General Services Administration, after Savage was able to leverage his reputation as a national political figure to bring attention to the potential importance of the site. The site was eventually designated a National Historic Landmark in 1993 and a National Monument in 2006 by President George W. Bush.

== Final years ==
During the last 5 years of his life, Congressman Savage hired Jokari T. Miller as his Chief of Security. He transported the Congressman from Washington, D.C. to Chicago, Illinois. While living in the Hyde Park area (just 5 minutes from the Chicago home of Barack Obama) Congressman Savage was being cared for by Linda Muhammad, a long-time friend of Gus, and he was at that point seemingly healthy. On October 29, 2015, Gus was discharged from the hospital after some minor issues and placed into the care of his son Thomas Savage.

=== Death ===
On October 30, 2015, Congressman Savage celebrated his 90th birthday, and he died the following day on October 31, 2015. He is survived by his son Thomas Savage, daughter Dr. Emma Savage, and grandchildren Thomas Savage Jr., Chyella McBride, and Alexandria Savage.

== See also ==
- List of African-American United States representatives

U.S. House of Representatives
Preceded by Morgan F. Murphy	Member of the U.S. House of Representatives from Illinois's 2nd congressional district 1981–1993	Succeeded by Mel Reynolds
