= Toward a more perfect union =

American English phrase

Toward a more perfect union is a phrase used in American political discourse. It is a slight rephrasing of the second clause of the Preamble to the United States Constitution, "in order to form a more perfect union." The phrase is used rhetorically to convey an idea that the United States remains an unfinished work-in-progress and that achieving the lofty goals espoused by the American founding documents demands continuing effort. According to one cultural history of the country's pre-revolutionary era,

"On the way toward declaring independence, Americans saw themselves as a separate people in the process of birth...Amidst all their bustle of practicality (they formed congresses, produced documents articulating their rights and grievances, established importation and exportation embargoes), they also took measures to alleviate internal tensions and to strengthen themselves as a people."
