= Sandi Jackson =

American politician (born 1963)

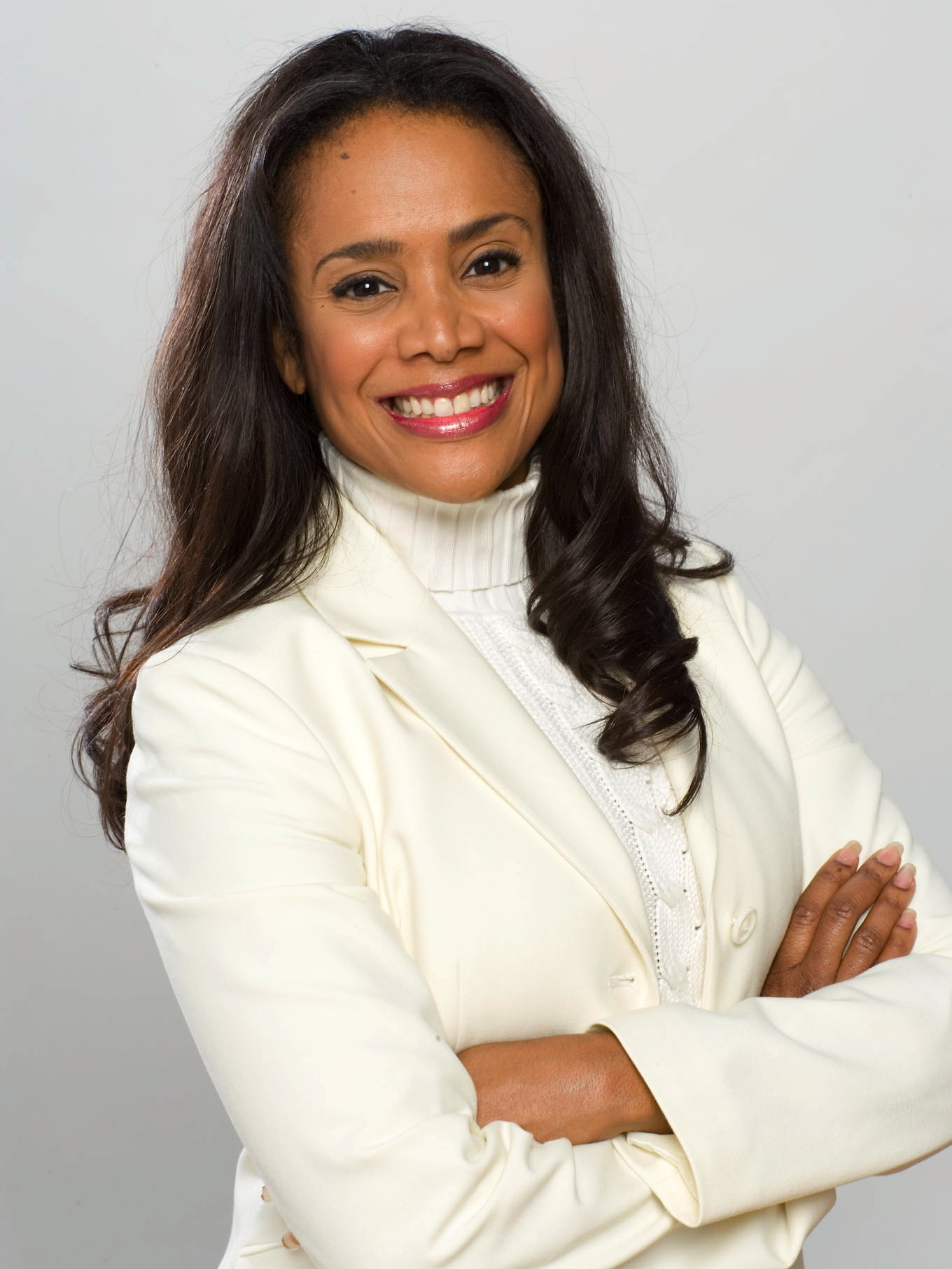
- 2007 portrait of Jackson

Member of the Chicago City Council from the 7th ward
- In office May 21, 2007 – January 15, 2013
- Preceded by: Darcel Beavers
- Succeeded by: Natashia Holmes

Personal details
- Born: Sandra Lee Stevens; September 14, 1963 (age 63) Kittery, Maine, U.S.
- Party: Democratic
- Spouse: Jesse Jackson Jr. (m. 1991; div. 2018)
- Children: 2
- Education: Bowling Green State University (BA); Georgetown University; University of Illinois, Urbana-Champaign (JD)
- Criminal information
- Status: Released
- Criminal charges: Filing of False Tax Returns – Title 26, U.S.C., Sec. 7206
- Penalty: 12 months in federal prison

Sandra Lee Jackson (née Stevens; born September 14, 1963) is an American politician. She was elected to the Chicago City Council as an alderman of the 7th ward of the City of Chicago in the 2007 municipal elections held on February 27, 2007. She succeeded Darcel A. Beavers who had been appointed by Chicago Mayor Richard M. Daley after the 2006 November elections to succeed her father William Beavers, Jackson's rival, as alderman of the 7th Ward. Jackson resigned from Chicago City Council, effective January 15, 2013. On February 20, 2013, Jackson pleaded guilty to one count of filing false tax returns, and on August 14, 2013, was sentenced to one year in prison.

She is the ex-wife of former U.S. Congressman Jesse Jackson Jr. and erstwhile daughter-in-law of Jesse Jackson. Her candidacy for the city council of a major city was part of national news stories in The New York Times, and thoughts of her running for a position in the United States House of Representatives were noted in Time.

Jackson has also been a longtime political consultant through her solely owned consulting firm J. Donatella & Associates.

== Personal life ==
Born in Kittery, Maine, Jackson grew up in Akron, Ohio. She is an alumna of Buchtel High School in Akron. Her mother, Sarah Stevens, who is from Atlanta, Georgia, worked three jobs cleaning homes to raise Jackson and two other children. Later Jackson helped her mother clean homes to pay her way through Bowling Green State University, where she earned her bachelor's degree in 1985. Jackson's father, Robert Stevens, was from Akron.

Jackson met her future husband while still a law student at Georgetown University Law Center. He convinced her to transfer to be with him at the University of Illinois College of Law, where she earned her Juris Doctor in 1992. The couple married on June 1, 1991. The Jackson family keeps two homes. They own one in the South Shore community area, which is within both the Illinois's 2nd congressional district that Congressman Jackson represented in the United States House of Representatives and within the seventh ward that Sandi Jackson represents on the Chicago City Council. The South Shore home serves as an election base. This home was the featured renovation on an HGTV Hidden Potential episode, first aired on March 24, 2009. They also own a home in Dupont Circle in Washington, D.C., which served as the family home and base for his service in Congress prior to her election. Prior to being elected, Jackson resided four days a week in Chicago and three days a week in Washington D.C.

The Jacksons have two children, Jessica Donatella Jackson (born March 13, 2000) and Jesse Louis Jackson, III, who is nicknamed "Tre", (born September 19, 2003). Sarah Stevens accompanies the family on commutes between Chicago and Washington. Jessica attended school in the Washington Metropolitan Area before Jackson's service on the city council. After Jackson was elected to serve as a full-time politician in a local legislative body in Chicago, she and her husband decided to have their children attend school in Chicago starting in the fall of 2007. Later, however, the family decided to keep their base in Washington. The family's residential choice has been a campaign issue as well as fodder for a local op-ed discussant.

Jackson had suffered multiple miscarriages before the birth of her two children. In a highly publicized medical case, she lost a boy who was born four months premature at University of Utah Medical Center in 1998. Complications arose while the couple was attending a youth leadership conference in Deer Valley 20 miles east of Salt Lake City, Utah. Jackson survived a three-hour surgical removal of a benign tumor from her neck on May 7, 2008. During the 2008 Christmas holidays, the family suffered a fire and was forced to spend the holiday season in a downtown hotel. In 2001, Jackson had a chili recipe published in "The Barking Gourmet," the St. Albans School family cookbook.

On July 14, 2016, Jackson's husband filed for divorce from her in Cook County, Illinois. They reached a settlement in April 2018.

== Early political experience ==
Early in Jackson's political career she served as press secretary for United States Congressman Mickey Leland. After the 1988 Democratic National Convention, she began working for Michael Dukakis who had become the Democratic party's nominee for United States President in the 1988 United States presidential election.

Jackson's political career prior to her election as 7th Ward Alderman included the following positions: Deputy Director of Training for the Democratic National Committee, Director of Scheduling Operations for Rev. Jesse Jackson, Vice President of Congressional and External Affairs for the Export-Import Bank of the United States (appointed by Bill Clinton), Director of VIP Relations for the Presidential Inaugural Committee, National Outreach Coordinator for the Clinton/Gore 96 Campaign, and campaign manager and chief political strategist for many other politicians.

During the 2000 presidential election, Jackson was listed as an Illinois state co-chair of GoreNet. GoreNet was a young-Americans focused group that supported the Al Gore campaign with a focus on grassroots and online organizing as well as hosting small dollar donor events.

"If Bill Clinton's wife can run for the U.S. Senate, if Bob Dole's wife can run for the Senate and for president, then why can't my wife be an alderman?"

— Jesse Jackson, Jr. (December 2002)

While Jackson was serving as the Export-Import Bank's director of congressional affairs, she lobbied in opposition of her husband's proposal to tighten the restrictions on the activities in Africa of the Export-Import Bank. She did so successfully, as her husband's amendment failed.

Jackson considered running for public office during the 2003 Chicago municipal elections. At the time, Jackson, Jr. discouraged his wife from running for public office. However, he felt his wife should be eligible to run for Alderman, despite the controversy surrounding such a candidacy.

== 2007 election ==
=== Campaign ===
In 2006, William Beavers announced that he would resign his 7th ward aldermanic seat to pursue the Cook County Board seat being vacated by John Stroger, after Stroger was forced to resign following a stroke. Beavers requested that Mayor Daley appoint his daughter to replace him, in order for her to have the incumbency advantage in the February 27, 2007 municipal elections. The deal also allowed for Todd Stroger to replace his father John as the president of the County Board and Beavers to surrender his ward seat after presiding over Mayor Daley's 2007 City Council budget hearings. In July 2007, when it first became public that Sandi Jackson was considering running for the 7th ward alderman seat, which would disrupt all the backroom dealings between the Strogers and the Beaverses with Daley's approval, Jackson, Jr. encouraged her to run. In the November 2006 elections, William Beavers won the County Board seat while Stroger won the County Board President's office that had been part of the dealings. On December 5, 2006, Jackson officially filed paperwork with state election officials. On December 12, Mayor Daley appointed Darcel Beavers to succeed her father until the Spring municipal elections. Then, on December 18, which is the filing deadline for petitions, Jackson filed 5,000 petition signatures to run for alderman.

Jackson carried numerous endorsements including The Chicago Tribune and numerous labor unions. Jackson was not endorsed by the Cook County Democratic Party.

The Jackson family (Sandi, Rev. Jesse Jackson Sr., and Congressman Jesse Jackson, Jr.) have occasionally not seen eye to eye with Mayor Daley. In fact, Congressman Jackson was considering contesting Daley for Mayor until the Democratic Party success in the 2006 fall elections made it clear he could be very productive by remaining in Congress because of his party's majority. Sandi Jackson, who is credited with encouraging Jackson, Jr. to run for Congress, had been supportive of the idea of him running for mayor. William Beavers had been a longtime Daley ally. However, Jackson says she has good relations with the Daleys, especially Bill Daley.

Jackson took leave from her position as deputy political director of training for the Democratic National Committee to run and her husband bought up the billboards in the ward to post an image of the couple. Jackson, Jr. had acquired the rights to 1,800 billboards in the city in preparation for his own possible mayoral candidacy. He relinquished the rights to all but those useful to his wife in her ward and a few candidates that he endorsed. Jackson, Jr. invested US$200,000 in his wife's campaign to pay for billboards, mailers, phone banks, a campaign manager and other professional staffers. William Beavers was unimpressed with the spending and had his employees remind voters that Jackson did not live in the Ward and his daughter did. William Beavers attempted to make Jackson's Washington residence an issue, and there was mudslinging in the public press between the Beaverses and the Jacksons. Jackson campaigned for the 7th ward alderman position based on the issues of economy, education, and public safety. She also described the lakefront ward as prime commercial real estate ripe for development.

==== Results ====
- Darcel Beavers 4004 (33.50%)
- Ron David 951 (7.96%)
- Eric Brown 216 (1.81%)
- Jackson 6783 (56.74%)

Beavers was one of only four incumbents on the 50-member City Council to lose during the municipal elections. Five new alderman supported by organized labor and Jackson Jr. won seats.

== Aldermanic career ==
The city of Chicago is divided into fifty wards that are each represented by an alderman in the Chicago City Council. The northern portion of Chicago's seventh ward is adjacent to the Lake Michigan lakefront, and the ward includes portions of the South Shore, South Chicago, Calumet Heights, and South Deering community areas.

Jackson's aldermanic career began inauspiciously when she complained to the Chicago Sun-Times, one of Chicago's major daily newspapers, that she was caught off-guard by the need to pay office start-up expenses up front. This provided fodder for a columnist in the Chicago Tribune, the other major daily, and anonymous on-line commenters on the Chicago Sun-Times web site made light of the issue. At the time, Jackson was considered by one local political writer as the most closely watched of the nine newly elected aldermen that were sworn in on May 21, 2007 and by another as the "star" of the incoming class of nine freshman aldermen.

Her first political statement as an alderman was disappointment in Mayor Daley's decision to force his affordable housing ordinance through the council with nine lame duck councilmen during the week before the new class was sworn in because new alderman would be "forced to live by" the new ordinance. Meanwhile, her husband propounded a 10-point ethics reform that would give the city's inspector general power to investigate aldermen; reduce the number of City Council committees to 10; limit municipal campaign contributions for each election cycle; and strip the mayor of the authority to appoint replacements for aldermanic vacancies.

Upon assuming office, she stated that she would emphasize economic development as her primary goal for her ward. One of her goals has been to redevelop the 570-acre (2.31 km^{2}) landfill on the site of the former U.S. Steel mill into a lakefront community.

A local political writer immediately looked for signs that the nine new councilmen who were supported by pro-labor forces would form a block against the pro-business Mayor and old guard members. Five of the new members were among eleven dissenters in a vote on mandatory public art purchase procedures during their first month on the job. In the fall of 2007, Jackson along with several other African-American alderman took issue with the allotment of contracts on the O'Hare Airport runway expansion project because African-American firms were only awarded 8% of the contracts and no general contractor roles. (Jackson's husband is a main proponent of the proposed Chicago south suburban airport in Peotone, Illinois). Jackson voted with the minority in the 29-21 vote approving the Mayor's November 2007 property tax increase. The February 2008 Real Estate Transfer Tax Increase also drew opposition from Jackson and a small minority of aldermen.

Jackson was among the co-sponsors of a council resolution in opposition of U.S. military attacks against Iraq.

There has been international press covering the City Council's deliberations regarding Grant Park and the Chicago Children's Museum. Mayor Daley has propounded a controversial proposal to relocate the Chicago Children's Museum from Navy Pier to a City park, Grant Park that passed 33–16, with Jackson in the minority.

Jackson called attention to American Airlines' newly imposed luggage handling fees for even the first checked bag. She claimed that the fees were contrary to Section 26-04 of the Airport Use Agreement with the City of Chicago, which is the contract that permits American Airlines to be a carrier in Chicago airports. The initial plan exempted Platinum and Executive card holders who were generally business travelers and placed an inordinate burden of new fees on the common traveler in contravention of the non-discriminatory price agreement in the agreement. She expressed interest in a City Council forum on the issue. She wrote directly to American Airlines and then wrote an article in the Chicago Sun-Times on the issue.

Jackson was among the councilman and citizens who expressed outrage at the light punishment issued by the mayor's office over a multimillion-dollar city contract scheme. Jackson viewed it as a moral issue where the Mayor did not appropriately condemn immoral activity, which in her eyes encourages similar behavior. During a Summer 2008 violent crime rash she was among the aldermen calling for refocussed emphasis on adequate police support.

She continues to tout a plan to redevelop the USX steel mill as an effort to revitalize her ward. She foresees 17,000 new residences, a high-end mall, and significant amounts of parkland with construction beginning in 2009. By the beginning of her second year on the 50-person city council, Jackson had already amassed the 17th largest pool of campaign funds.

She has been vocal in pursuit of transparency on the issue of whether Mayor Daley should transfer the monitoring of city hiring to Inspector General David Hoffman and has voted against the mayors proposal to create a separate Office of Compliance. Her voting record earned her praise from the Independent Voters of Illinois-Independent Precinct Organization. A year and a half into Jackson's first term, local political commentator Don Rose writing in the Chicago Sun-Times included Jackson among four aldermen he considered to be inheriting a mantle of reform.

In 2001, the Federal Election Commission ruled that Jackson, Jr. could hire his wife on his campaign payroll. The ruling stated that relatives can be employed as long as they were compensated "no more than the fair market value" for their services. At the time, Sandi Jackson was employed by the Democratic National Committee (DNC) as the deputy director of training. Many other lawmakers have made similar arrangements without contacting the FEC for a ruling. When House Majority Leader Tom DeLay was charged with ethical infractions, matters such as these came to light. Jackson remained on the payroll of her husband's main campaign fund, Jesse Jackson Jr. for Congress, in 2006 as she considered a run for public office. She also continued to be employed by Howard Dean of the DNC. Between 2001 and early 2009, Jesse Jackson Jr.'s congressional campaign paid Sandra at least $247,500, including at least $95,000 after Sandra became Alderman.

Jackson received a $4,000 digital radio from Chicago's Office of Emergency Management and Communications (Chicago's 911 Center) to monitor snow removal and emergency operations in her ward. The radio was returned when the controversy that arose led to a personnel reshuffling that included the reassignment of a high ranking Hispanic city employee.

When Congressman Bobby Rush was battling cancer, Time and other publications mentioned Jackson as a potential future candidate for the United States House of Representatives in Illinois's 1st congressional district. Responding to resignation requests, Rush noted that he would be returning to his congressional duties following post-operative treatment. When he returned to full health he noted his disappointment in the premature consideration of his replacement. The issue led to a public reconciliation initiated by Jackson, Jr. at the 2008 Democratic National Convention, termed a "hugfest" by the press. While considering the possibility of Jackson, Jr. being appointed to fill Barack Obama's United States Senate seat, the Chicago Sun-Times mentioned her as a possible candidate for Jackson, Jr.'s Illinois's 2nd congressional district seat.

During the Rod Blagojevich corruption scandal, Jackson's name was mentioned in the pay-to-play activities of then-Illinois Governor Rod Blagojevich. Allegedly, the governor had considered her for the state lottery director and then asked for contributions from her husband Congressman Jackson. After the Congressman Jackson did not make a contribution, she was not selected and Blagojevich made the causality of the non-contribution in the matter.

In 2008, her second year as alderman, Jackson directed more than $32,000 in payments from her aldermanic expense account to her American Express account. Jackson said she used an AmEx account to launch her office during her freshman term.

== Criminal investigation, resignation and conviction ==
In 2012 federal prosecutors reviewed evidence that Jackson faced potential criminal liability for misuse of her husband's campaign funds; allegedly she and the Congressman used campaign funds to decorate their Washington, DC home. Jackson resigned from Chicago City Council, effective January 15, 2013. On February 15, 2013 Jackson agreed to a plea deal. On February 20, 2013, Jackson pleaded guilty to one count of filing false tax returns after neglecting to declare nearly $580,000 in income.

On August 14, 2013, Jackson was sentenced to 12 months in federal prison, while her husband was sentenced to 30 months in jail. Judge Berman Jackson said she'd let the couple decide who should first serve out their prison term. Court documents also showed she had spent campaign funds on personal items such as vacations, electronics and furs. She was ordered to pay $22,000 in restitution. She entered the Federal Prison Camp, Alderson in Alderson, West Virginia to begin her sentence on October 20, 2015 after her husband was paroled. She completed her prison term on October 18, 2016 and began 12 months of supervised release.

== Non-Aldermanic work ==
In October 2007, Jackson filed to pursue William Beavers' 7th ward Democratic Committeeman post. Among other duties, committeemen determine appointments for vacated political posts in and including their ward. Two days later, Beavers filed to run to retain his position. In the race for the local post, her husband requested permission from the Federal Election Commission to use his campaign funds in support of her local race. The commission voted in favor of allowing unlimited contributions to his wife's candidacy from his $827,000 fund. On February 5, 2008, Sandi Jackson defeated rival William Beavers in the election for 7th Ward Democratic Committeemen by 77.5%–22.5%., a 3–1 margin over Beavers.

Jackson has also been a long-time political consultant through her solely owned consulting firm J. Donatella & Associates. She has run and advised on several Democratic campaigns including her husband's Congressional races. She continued to be active in this arena while serving as an alderman. She has served as a campaign manager and chief political strategist for Robin Kelly, David Miller, William Davis and James Meeks.
