= Mel Reynolds =

American politician from Illinois

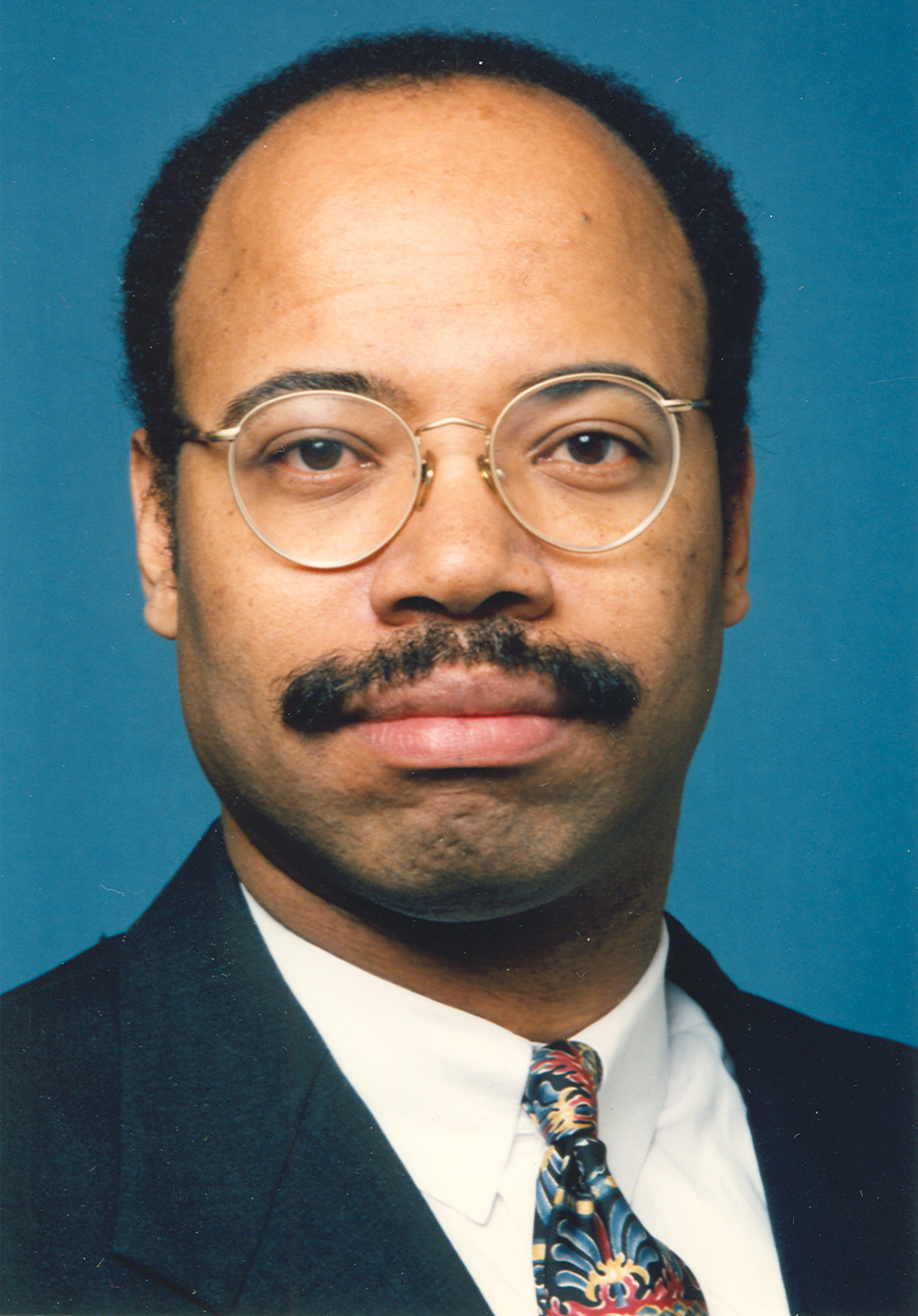

Member of the U.S. House of Representatives from Illinois's 2nd district
- In office January 3, 1993 – October 1, 1995
- Preceded by: Gus Savage
- Succeeded by: Jesse Jackson Jr.

Personal details
- Born: Melvin Reynolds; January 8, 1952 (age 74) Mound Bayou, Mississippi, U.S.
- Party: Democratic
- Education: City Colleges of Chicago; University of Illinois, Urbana-Champaign (BA); Lincoln College, Oxford (LLB); Harvard University (MPA)

Melvin Reynolds (born January 8, 1952) is an American politician from Illinois. A member of the Democratic Party, he served in the United States House of Representatives from 1993 to 1995. He resigned in October 1995 after a jury convicted him of sexual assault charges related to sex with an underage campaign worker.

== Early life ==
Reynolds and his twin brother, Marvin Jerry Reynolds, were born in Mound Bayou, Mississippi to Reverend J. J. Reynolds and Essie Mae Prather. Reynolds moved to Chicago as a child. He received an Associate of Arts from one of the City Colleges of Chicago, and graduated from the University of Illinois at Urbana-Champaign, and from Harvard University with a M.P.A. He also won a Rhodes Scholarship to the University of Oxford, where he attended Lincoln College and received an LL.B.

Before entering politics, Reynolds worked as an assistant professor of political science at Roosevelt University in Chicago, Illinois. He also founded the Community Economic Development and Education Foundation.

== Political career ==
Reynolds ran three times from 1988 to 1992 in Democratic Party elections for the 2nd District against incumbent Gus Savage, who was known for racially incendiary and anti-Semitic remarks that drew criticism from both Republicans and Democrats. In 1988, Reynolds finished third with only 14% of the vote with multiple candidates running. In 1990, Reynolds lost, but ran much closer after Savage's conduct was criticized by the House Ethics Committee in connection with a sex scandal.

In 1992, redistricting pushed the 2nd further into Chicago's suburbs. The New York Times reported that this change was "seen as a benefit to the 40-year-old Mr. Reynolds, whose appeals for accountability and racial unity sit well with middle-class black moderates embarrassed by Mr. Savage and whites frightened by his often combative, racially charged speech." Shortly before the primary, Reynolds was lightly injured when unknown gunmen fired shotguns at his vehicle while he was waiting at an intersection. He was given police protection for the rest of the campaign; Savage's supporters accused Reynolds of staging the incident to generate sympathy for himself and suspicion of Savage. Reynolds did not directly accuse Savage of organizing the attack.

Days later, Reynolds beat Savage in the Democratic primary on March 17, and easily won the general election in November. In Congress, he was granted a seat on the Ways and Means Committee, the first freshman to serve on this committee in 14 years. He voted for the North American Free Trade Agreement and introduced legislation on gun control.

== Convictions and resignation ==
In August 1994, Reynolds was indicted for sexual assault and criminal sexual abuse for engaging in a sexual relationship with a 16-year-old campaign volunteer that began during the 1992 campaign. He also faced charges of child pornography for asking the underage campaign worker to obtain "lewd photographs of another girl who was age 15" and obstruction of justice for convincing one of the girls involved to lie to authorities. Despite the charges, he continued his campaign and was re-elected in November without opposition. Reynolds initially denied the charges, which he claimed were racially motivated.

On August 22, 1995, Reynolds was convicted on 12 counts of criminal sexual assault, sexual abuse, obstruction of justice, and solicitation of child pornography. He resigned his seat on October 1 of that year. Had he attempted to stay in office, his role in Congress would have been very limited, as longstanding House rules state that a member convicted of a felony should not take part in floor votes or committee work until the House Ethics Committee reviews the matter. Reynolds was sentenced to five years in federal prison and was expected to be released in 1998.

== Bank fraud ==
In April 1997, Reynolds was convicted on 16 new counts of bank fraud, misusing campaign funds for personal use, and lying to FEC investigators. Specifically, one count of bank fraud, two counts of wire fraud, eight counts of making false statements on loan applications, one count of conspiracy to defraud the Federal Election Commission, and four counts of making false statements to the FEC.

These charges resulted in an additional sentence of 78 months in federal prison, to run consecutively with his 1995 sentence. Reynolds served all of his first sentence, and served 42 months in prison for the later charges. President Bill Clinton then commuted his sentence for bank fraud and Reynolds was released from prison. He served the remaining time in a halfway house.

== Later career ==
In January 2001, Reynolds was hired by Jesse Jackson's Rainbow/PUSH Coalition to decrease the number of young African Americans going to prison.

In 2004, Reynolds sought to win back his old House seat, but was overwhelmingly defeated in the Democratic primary by the man who had succeeded him, Jesse Jackson, Jr., with Jackson netting 88% of the vote. Reynolds sought the seat again, running in the 2013 special election to replace Jackson after Jackson retired. He came in 7th place in the Democratic primary.

== Later legal troubles ==
On February 18, 2014, Reynolds was arrested in Zimbabwe for overstaying his visa. He was allegedly found to be in possession of pornographic videos he had filmed with several women at the hotel where he was staying. Possession of pornography is a crime in the country. He had also purportedly accrued over $24,000 in hotel charges that he had yet to pay. The pornography charges were later dropped, but he pleaded guilty to violating immigration laws, and was deported to South Africa. He claimed in early March 2014 to be hiding there from Zimbabwean death squads, who he claimed were targeting him because he possessed information about American companies from Chicago doing business illegally in Zimbabwe.

On June 26, 2015, Reynolds was indicted by a grand jury for failure to file federal income tax returns for the 2009 through 2012 tax years on more than $400,000 income. The next month he missed his arraignment, because he claimed he could not return to the U.S. due to issues with his daughter's health. While it was not clear where Reynolds was, in 2014 he stated that he had previously hidden in South Africa out of fear for his life.

In April 2016, Reynolds was sentenced to two months of prison for two bond violations in his tax case and his trial was scheduled for September; Reynolds decided to represent himself in court. Reynolds claims the majority of the income the government claimed should be filed on income tax returns was given by Elzie Higginbottom, the key witness for the trial on misdemeanor tax charges, to him in order to travel to South Africa to set up opportunities in real estate and the diamond industry.

On September 28, 2017, Judge Robert Gettleman found Reynolds guilty on tax charges, on all four counts alleging he failed to file a federal income tax return for four consecutive years. He was sentenced by Gettleman to six months in prison on May 10, 2018, which he began serving at the Metropolitan Correctional Center in Chicago on August 1. At a press conference after the sentencing, Reynolds stated he planned to move to South Africa with his daughter after his release.

Released into a halfway house in November 2018, Reynolds filed a lawsuit against deposed Zimbabwean dictator Robert Mugabe and a Chicago-area businessman for what he said was "physical and psychological torture" that took place during his 2014 detainment in Zimbabwe. Reynolds received permission from the U.S. court to travel to Africa while on supervised release. However, as of August 2019, he was still living in the Chicago area.

== Personal life ==
Reynolds is Catholic.

== See also ==
- List of African-American United States representatives
- List of American federal politicians convicted of crimes
- List of people pardoned or granted clemency by the president of the United States

U.S. House of Representatives
Preceded by Gus Savage	Member of the U.S. House of Representatives from Illinois's 2nd congressional district 1993–1995	Succeeded by Jesse Jackson Jr.
U.S. order of precedence (ceremonial)
Preceded by John W. Cox Jr. as Former U.S. Representative	Order of precedence of the United States as Former U.S. Representative	Succeeded by Michael Patrick Flanagan as Former U.S. Representative
