= 2022 Illinois's 1st congressional district election =

- November 8, 2022
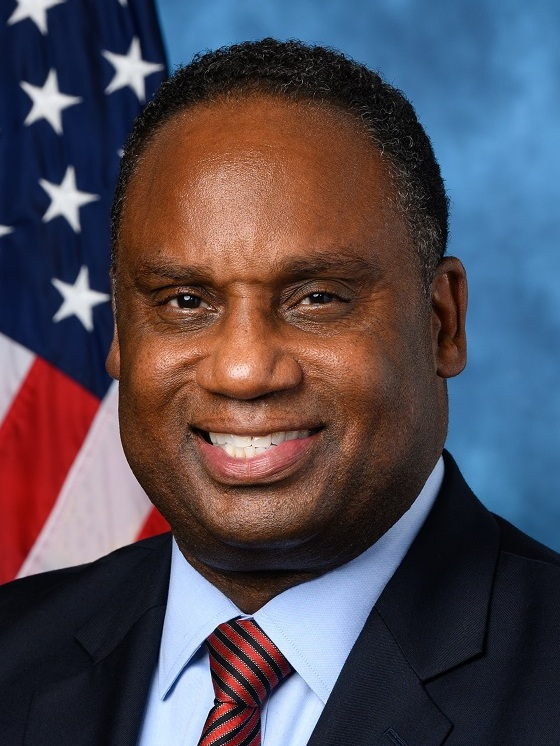

Nominee	Jonathan Jackson	Eric Carlson
Party	Democratic	Republican
Popular vote	159,142	78,258
Percentage	67.0%	33.0%
- Jackson: 50–60% 60–70% 70–80% 80–90% >90% Carlson: 50–60% 60–70% 70–80% No votes
U.S. Representative before election
Bobby Rush
Democratic
Elected U.S. Representative
Jonathan Jackson
Democratic

The 2022 Illinois's 1st congressional district election was held on November 8, 2022, to elect the United States representative for Illinois's 1st congressional district, concurrently with elections for the other U.S. House districts in Illinois and the rest of the country, as well as the 2022 U.S. Senate race in Illinois, other elections to the United States Senate, and various state and local elections. Primary elections were held on June 28. Before the 2020 redistricting cycle, the 1st district was primarily based in the South Side of Chicago. Under the new congressional map, although the 1st district is still based in Chicago, including portions of Bronzeville, Hyde Park, Grand Crossing, Morgan Park, and Roseland, it now reaches down to the southwest and takes in a collection of exurban and rural areas in Cook County, Will County, and Kankakee County. The district as a whole is slightly under 50% black.

Since 1993, the district had been represented by Democrat Bobby Rush. On January 3, 2022, Rush announced that he would retire rather than seek a sixteenth term in office.

Because Rush announced his retirement just six months before the primaries, the race to succeed him was relatively brief. A wide field of candidates ran in the Democratic primary, including state senator Jacqueline Collins, Chicago alderwoman Pat Dowell, business professor Jonathan Jackson, and attorney Karin Norington-Reaves, whom Rush endorsed as his successor. Jackson won the primary with a low plurality and advanced to the general election, as did nonprofit founder Eric Carlson, who narrowly defeated gun dealer Jeff Regnier in the Republican primary. As expected in this solidly liberal district, Jackson easily dispatched Carlson. Jackson's victory continued the 1st district's 93-year tradition of electing a black man as its representative, dating back to the election of Oscar De Priest in 1929. Jackson took office in the 118th United States Congress in January 2023, joining the Congressional Progressive Caucus.

== Democratic primary ==
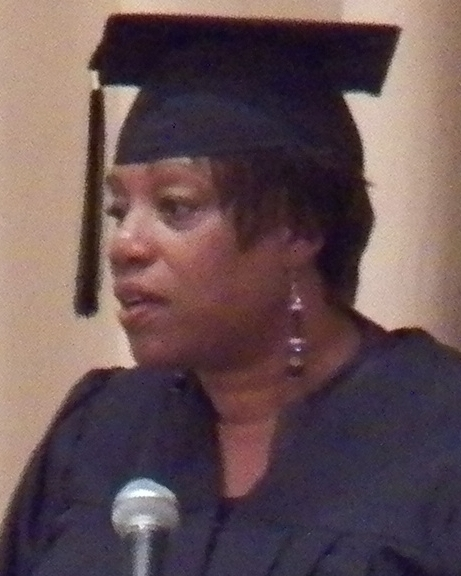
Pat Dowell

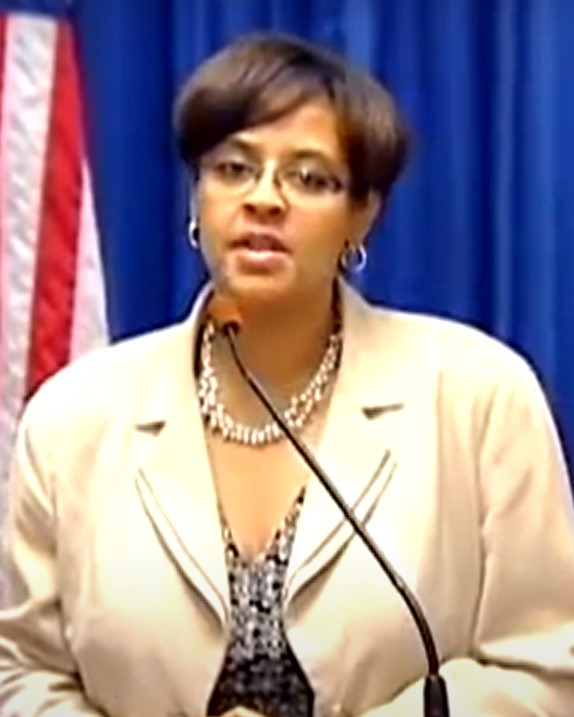
Karin Norington-Reaves

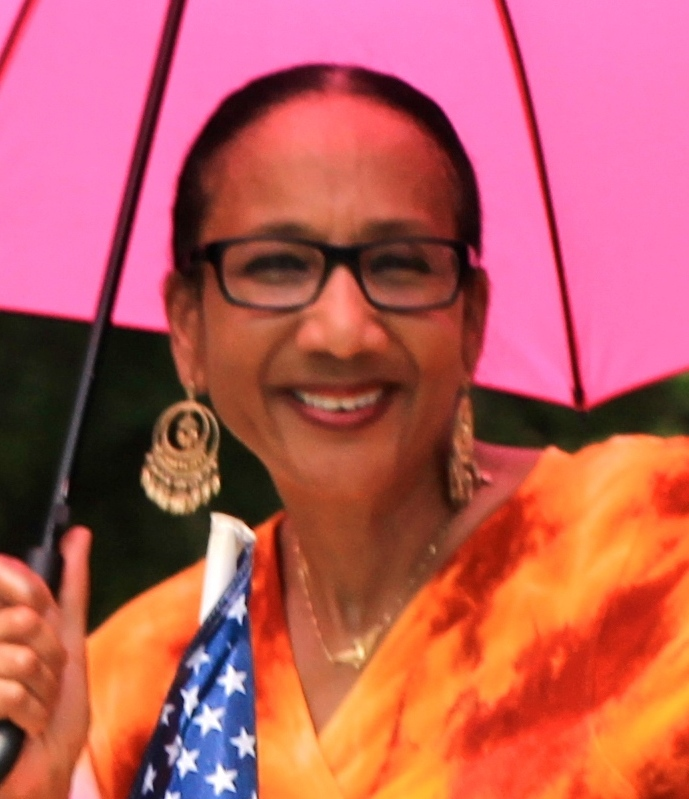
Jacqueline Collins

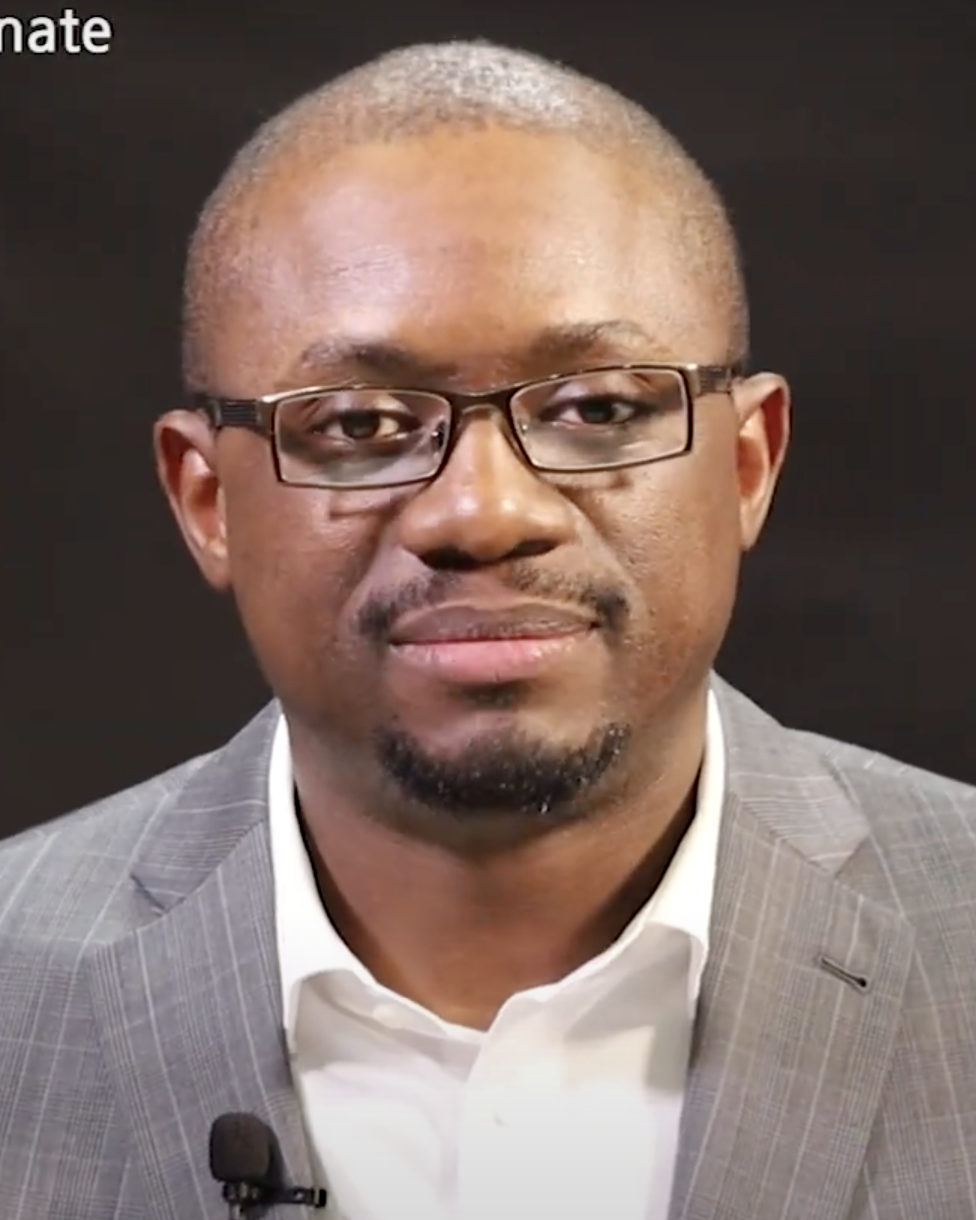
Chris Butler

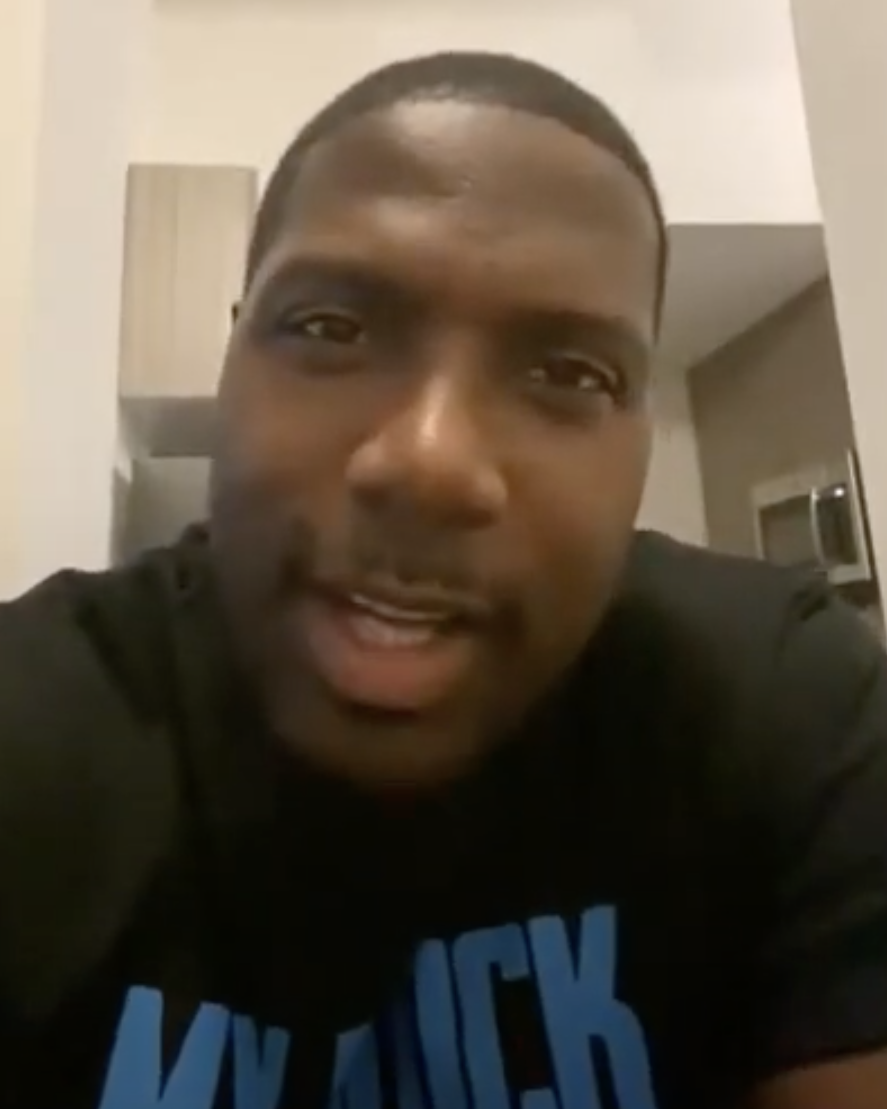
Jahmal Cole

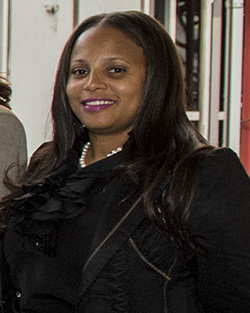
Charise Williams

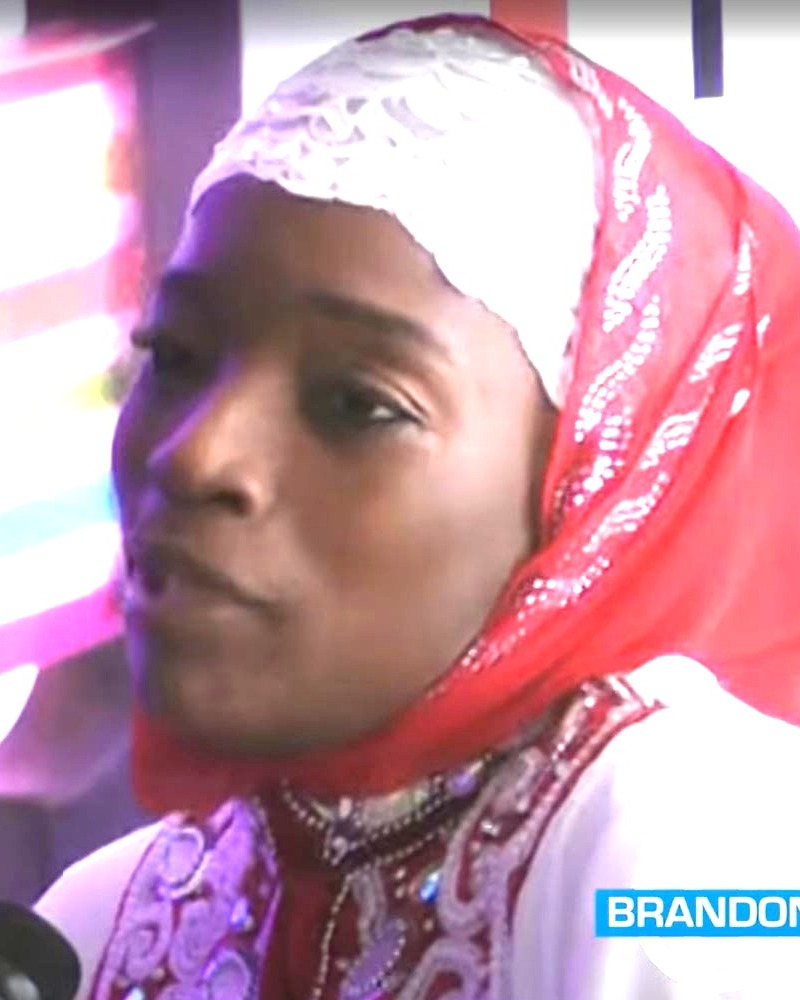
Ameena Matthews

=== Campaign ===
On January 5, Chicago City Council member Pat Dowell, who had previously been running a long-shot bid for Illinois Secretary of State, announced that she would drop out of that race and instead run to succeed Bobby Rush. On January 9, Karin Norington-Reaves, the CEO of a Chicago-based jobs agency, entered the race. Rush endorsed Norington-Reaves at a press conference on January 13. On January 28, Jonathan Jackson, a business professor, announced a bid for the seat. He is the son of the Reverend Jesse Jackson and the brother of former congressman Jesse Jackson Jr. State senator Jacqueline Collins entered the race in March.

In total, seventeen candidates made the primary ballot. The candidates rarely criticized each other, primarily campaigning on their own experience and life story in an attempt to carve out a unique position in the crowded race. Their campaigns relied more on door-to-door canvassing and less on advertising compared to nearby primary elections.

On June 20, a week before the primary, Jackson attracted controversy after his Federal Election Commission filings revealed that his campaign had received over $1 million from PACs associated with the cryptocurrency industry, including $500,000 from a PAC largely funded by wealthy cryptocurrency executive Sam Bankman-Fried.

=== Criticisms ===
Jackson was a vocal supporter of cryptocurrency during his campaign and listed it as one of his key campaign issues. Norington-Reaves criticized Jackson for presenting himself as a progressive despite taking large donations from super PACs, while Dowell accused him of putting a "for sale sign" on Rush's House seat. Jackson also faced criticism for failing to file timely financial disclosures with the Federal Election Commission. Collins accused him of intentionally delaying his financial disclosures in order to hide who he was receiving money from. In response to the controversy, Jackson claimed that the donations were unsolicited and that his delay in filing disclosures was a mistake. PACs aligned with the cryptocurrency industry spent over $4 million in total on behalf of Illinois House candidates in the 2022 primaries, including Chuy Garcia in the 4th district Democratic primary, Nikki Budzinski in the 13th district Democratic primary, and Rodney Davis in the 15th district Republican primary.

=== Candidates ===
==== Nominee ====
- Jonathan Jackson, business professor, spokesperson for the Rainbow/PUSH coalition, son of reverend Jesse Jackson, and brother of former U.S. Representative Jesse Jackson Jr.

==== Eliminated in primary ====
- Kirby Birgans, educator and advocate
- Chris Butler, pastor
- Jahmal Cole, founder of My Block, My Hood, My City
- Jacqueline Collins, state senator
- Steven DeJoie, consultant and restaurateur
- Pat Dowell, Chicago City Council member
- Cassandra Goodrum, professor of Criminal Justice at Chicago State University
- Marcus Lewis, minister
- Ameena Matthews, anti-violence activist, subject of The Interrupters, and candidate for this district in 2020
- Karin Norington-Reaves, attorney and CEO of the Chicago Cook Workforce Partnership
- Robert Palmer, educator
- Terre Layng Rosner, Professor of Communication at the University of St. Francis
- Jonathan Swain, businessman and former chair of the Chicago Zoning Board of Appeals
- Michael Thompson, educator
- Charise Williams, former deputy director of the Illinois Criminal Justice Information Authority

==== Removed from ballot ====
- Darius Nix, educator
- Stephany Rose Spaulding, pastor and nominee for Colorado's 5th congressional district in 2018

==== Declined ====
- Marcus Evans, state representative (ran for re-election)
- Nykea Pippion McGriff, realtor
- Robert Peters, state senator (ran for re-election)
- Bobby Rush, incumbent U.S. representative
- Elgie Sims, state senator (ran for re-election)

=== Polling ===
Poll source	Date(s) administered	Sample size (Note: Key: A – all adults RV – registered voters LV – likely voters V – unclear)	Margin of error	Jacqueline Collins	Pat Dowell	Jonathan Jackson	Karin Norington-Reaves	Jonathan Swain	Other	Undecided
Lake Research Partners (D) (Note: Poll conducted for Collins's campaign)	May 10–12, 2022	400 (LV)	± 4.9%	14%	14%	19%	5%	3%	3%	42%

=== Endorsements ===
Chris Butler

U.S. representatives

- Dan Lipinski, former U.S. representative for Illinois's 3rd congressional district

Organizations

- American Solidarity Party
- Democrats for Life of America
- Home School Legal Defense Association
- Illinois Family Institute
- Susan B. Anthony List
- Illinois State Fraternal Order of Police
Jacqueline Collins

State senators

- Omar Aquino, state senator from the 2nd district
- Christopher Belt, state senator from the 57th district
- Scott M. Bennett, state senator from the 52nd district
- Melinda Bush, state senator from the 31st district
- Cristina Castro, state senator from the 22nd district
- Bill Cunningham, president pro tempore of the Illinois Senate
- Laura Ellman, state senator from the 21st district
- Sara Feigenholtz, state senator from the 6th district
- Laura Fine, state senator from the 9th district
- Ann Gillespie, state senator from the 27th district
- Suzy Glowiak Hilton, state senator from the 24th district
- Don Harmon, President of the Illinois Senate
- Napoleon Harris III, state senator from the 15th district
- Adriane Johnson, state senator from the 30th district
- Emil Jones Jr., former state senator (1983–2009)
- Patrick Joyce, state senator from the 40th district
- David Koehler, state senator from the 46th district
- Steven Landek, state senator from the 12th district
- Kimberly Lightford, state senator from the 4th district
- Robert Martwick, state senator from the 10th district
- Antonio Muñoz, state senator from the 1st district
- Laura Murphy, state senator from the 28th district
- Robert Peters, state senator from the 13th district
- Elgie R. Sims Jr., state senator from the 17th district
- Justin Slaughter, state senator from the 27th district
- Doris Turner, state senator from the 48th district
- Patricia Van Pelt, state senator from the 5th district
- Ram Villivalam, state senator from the 8th district

State representatives

- Carol Ammons, state representative from the 103rd district
- Lakesia Collins, state representative from the 9th district
- Will Davis, state representative from the 30th district
- Mary Flowers, state representative from the 31st district
- Jehan Gordon-Booth, state representative
- LaToya Greenwood, state representative
- Will Guzzardi, state representative from the 39th district
- Camille Lilly, state representative
- Theresa Mah, state representative from the 2nd district
- Debbie Meyers-Martin, state representative from the 38th district
- Cyril Nichols, state representative from the 32nd district
- Nick Smith, state representative from the 34th district
- Larry Walsh, state representative from the 86th district

Chicago alders

- Michelle Harris, alderwoman from the 8th ward
- David H. Moore, alderman from the 17th ward

Individuals

- Cornel West, philosopher and activist

Labor unions

- SEIU Healthcare Illinois
Pat Dowell

U.S. senators

- Carol Moseley Braun, former U.S. senator from Illinois (1993–1999)

Local officials

- Matthew O'Shea, Chicago City Council member from the 19th ward

Labor unions

- Service Employees International Union Local 1
- UNITE HERE Local 1
Jonathan Jackson

Federal officials

- Chuy Garcia, U.S. representative from IL-04 (2015–present)
- Jesse Jackson, former Shadow U.S. Senator from the District of Columbia; candidate for President of the United States in 1984 and 1988 (Jackson's father)
- Ro Khanna, U.S. representative from California's 17th congressional district (2017–)
- Bernie Sanders, U.S. senator from Vermont (2007–present)

State officials

- Emil Jones Jr., former president of the Illinois Senate

Local officials

- Stanley Moore, member of the Cook County Board of Commissioners
- David Orr, former Cook County Clerk (1990–2014)

Organizations

- Our Revolution
- Protect Our Future

Labor unions

- Amalgamated Transit Union International
- Chicago Teachers Union
Karin Norington-Reaves

U.S. representatives

- Luis Gutiérrez, former U.S. representative from Illinois's 4th congressional district (1993–2019)
- Bobby Rush, U.S. representative from IL-01 (1993–2023)

Newspapers

- Chicago Tribune

Organizations

- International Brotherhood of Electrical Workers Local 134
- International Brotherhood of Teamsters Joint Council 25
- International Union of Operating Engineers Local 150
Bobby Rush (Declined to run)

Organizations

- Planned Parenthood Action Fund
Charise Williams

State representatives

- Rita Mayfield, state representative from the 60th district

Individuals

- John W. Rogers Jr., investor and businessman

=== Results ===
Democratic primary results
Party	Candidate	Votes	%
Democratic	Jonathan Jackson	21,607	28.2
Democratic	Pat Dowell	14,594	19.0
Democratic	Karin Norington-Reaves	10,825	14.1
Democratic	Jacqueline Collins	9,299	12.1
Democratic	Chris Butler	4,141	5.4
Democratic	Jahmal Cole	4,045	5.3
Democratic	Jonathan Swain	2,554	3.3
Democratic	Michael Thompson	1,680	2.2
Democratic	Charise Williams	1,601	2.1
Democratic	Cassandra Goodrum	1,422	1.9
Democratic	Marcus Lewis	901	1.2
Democratic	Robert Palmer	899	1.2
Democratic	Nykea Pippion McGriff	892	1.2
Democratic	Terre Layng Rosner	780	1.0
Democratic	Ameena Matthews	686	0.9
Democratic	Kirby Birgans	511	0.7
Democratic	Steven DeJoie	251	0.3
Total votes		76,688	100.0

== Republican primary ==
=== Candidates ===
==== Nominee ====
- Eric Carlson, nonprofit director and U.S. Army veteran

==== Eliminated in primary ====
- Jeff Regnier, gun dealer
- Philanise White, renal technician and nominee in 2020
- Geno Young, musician

=== Results ===
Republican primary results
Party	Candidate	Votes	%
Republican	Eric Carlson	10,755	40.5
Republican	Jeff Regnier	10,375	39.0
Republican	Geno Young	3,853	14.5
Republican	Philanise White	1,598	6.0
Total votes		26,581	100.0

== General election ==
=== Predictions ===
Source	Ranking	As of
The Cook Political Report	Solid D	November 30, 2021
Inside Elections	Solid D	January 28, 2022
Sabato's Crystal Ball	Safe D	December 2, 2021
Politico	Solid D	April 5, 2022
RCP	Safe D	June 9, 2022
Fox News	Solid D	July 11, 2022
DDHQ	Solid D	July 20, 2022
538	Solid D	June 30, 2022
The Economist	Safe D	September 28, 2022

=== Results ===
2022 Illinois's 1st congressional district election
Party	Candidate	Votes	%	±%
Democratic	Jonathan Jackson	159,142	67.03%	−6.77
Republican	Eric Carlson	78,258	32.96%	+6.81
Write-in		25	0.01%	−0.04
Total votes		237,425	100.0%	
Democratic hold				

By county

County	Jonathan Jackson Democratic		Eric Carlson Republican		Write-in		Margin		Total votes
County	#	%	#	%	#	%	#	%	Total votes
Cook (part)	125,004	87.21	18,312	12.78	19	0.01	106,692	74.43	143,335
Kankakee (part)	4,578	35.26	8,406	64.74	1	0.00	-3,828	-29.48	12,985
Will (part)	29,560	36.45	51,540	63.55	5	0.01	-21,980	-27.10	81,105
Totals	159,142	67.03	78,258	32.96	25	0.01	80,884	34.07	237,425

== Notes ==
Partisan clients
