= Jonathan Jackson (Illinois politician) =

American activist and politician (born 1966)

- Official portrait, 2025

Member of the U.S. House of Representatives from Illinois's 1st district
- Incumbent
- Assumed office January 3, 2023
- Preceded by: Bobby Rush

Personal details
- Born: Jonathan Luther Jackson; January 7, 1966 (age 60) Chicago, Illinois, U.S.
- Party: Democratic
- Spouse: Marilyn Richards (m. 1995)
- Children: 3
- Parents: Jesse Jackson; Jacqueline Jackson
- Relatives: Santita Jackson (sister); Jesse Jackson Jr. (brother) Yusef Jackson (brother)
- Education: North Carolina A&T State University (BA); Northwestern University (MBA)
- Website: House website Campaign website
- Jackson's voice Jackson on the 250th anniversary of the United States; Recorded June 30, 2026

Jonathan Luther Jackson (born January 7, 1966) is an American activist and politician serving as the U.S. representative for Illinois's 1st congressional district since 2023. A member of the Democratic Party and son of Rev. Jesse Jackson, he was previously the national spokesman for the Rainbow/PUSH Coalition, a financial analyst, and a partner in the beer distributorship River North Sales and Service, based in Chicago.

== Early life and education ==
Jackson was born in Chicago to Jesse Jackson, the noted civil rights activist and Baptist minister, and Jacqueline Lavinia Jackson. His godfather was Martin Luther King Jr., from whom Jackson gets his middle name. Jackson has five siblings, Santita Jackson and former U.S. Representative Jesse Jackson Jr., his elders, and Yusef, Jacqueline Jackson, and Ashley, his younger siblings.

Jackson attended Whitney M. Young Magnet High School in Chicago, where he was a student-athlete. He attended his parents' alma mater, North Carolina A&T State University in Greensboro, North Carolina, to study business where he obtained his bachelor's degree. He is also an MBA graduate of the Kellogg School of Management at Northwestern University in Evanston, Illinois.

== Civil and human rights activism ==
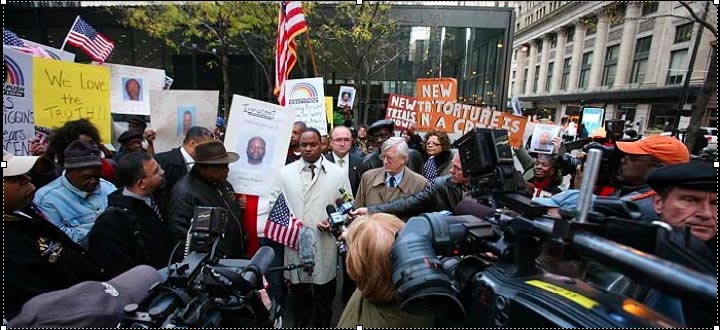
Jonathan Jackson outside Jon Burge indictment

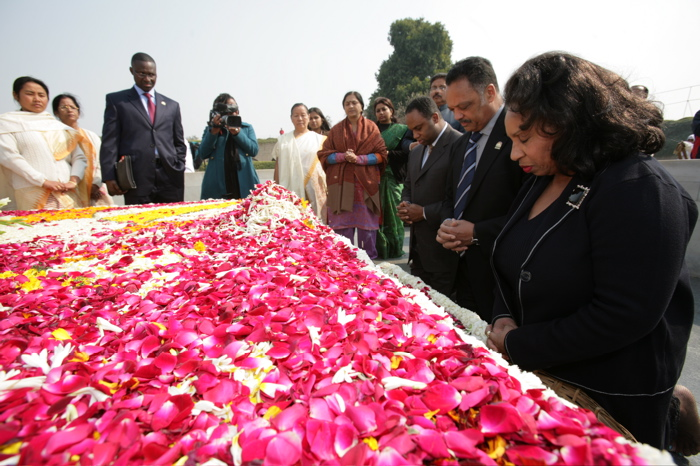
The Jacksons visit Gandhi's grave

Born into a family steeped in human rights activism, Jackson traveled the world as an aide de camp to his father. He traveled to Syria in 1983, when his father negotiated with Syrian President Hafez al-Assad to release captured American pilot Robert Goodman. He met Fidel Castro in 1984, when his father negotiated the release of 22 Americans being held in Cuba. He was also with his father in August 2005, when he traveled to Venezuela to meet Venezuelan President Hugo Chávez. This followed controversial remarks by televangelist Pat Robertson implying that Chávez should be assassinated. Jackson condemned Robertson's remarks as immoral.

In 2007, Jonathan Jackson took on the issues of innocence and juvenile justice as national spokesman for the RainbowPUSH Coalition. He has highlighted the personal stories and continued trials of those who accused the Chicago Police Department of torturing them to obtain confessions that landed them in prison. They include Darrell Cannon, who faced the death penalty for a 1983 drug-related murder. Cannon was released after accepting a January 2001 deal to abandon his torture claim in exchange for being released, according to the Northwestern Center on Wrongful Convictions. Jackson has also showcased the travails of Oscar Walden, who in 1952 became Illinois's first exoneree. Walden was freed after being sentenced to 75 years for a rape he did not commit.

Jackson has championed the cause of Johnnie Lee Savory, a Peoria native convicted of stabbing to death his friends Connie Cooper and James Robinson in their Peoria home in 1977. After serving over 28 years in prison, Savory was released on parole on December 19, 2006. Jackson is among several notables who have petitioned the Illinois governor—first Rod Blagojevich, then Pat Quinn—to order DNA testing in Savory's case to prove not only that did Savory not kill his friends, but also to pinpoint the person widely suspected of committing the crime.

In 2008, Jackson turned his attention to the closures of Chicago Public Schools. He has led several schools to public hearings and civic education training to thwart school closures and turnarounds by private companies in favor of investing in existing schools and keeping a community's institutional memory intact—especially in highly mobile neighborhoods where large numbers of students are homeless or living on the economic margins. In February 2010, he succeeded in helping Guggenheim Elementary School get off the closure list. Guggenheim is in the Englewood community on the city's South Side. Jackson, among others, made the case that forcing students to walk any further to school put them in harm's way. They also made the case that Guggenheim's test scores have steadily improved and it had a close-knit community with the momentum to achieve further gains. Previously, Jackson had persuaded school officials to abandon plans to close Holmes Elementary School, among others.

Jackson's view of outsourcing public education mirrors that of an emerging vocal group of educators such as New York University's Diane Ravitch and activists who assert that over-reliance on test scores and privatizing of public schools through wholesale charters and outsourcing allows schools to cherry-pick their student bodies while siphoning resources from the most marginalized children. They consider programs such as No Child Left Behind and charter schools as a divestment of public education.

== Professional career ==
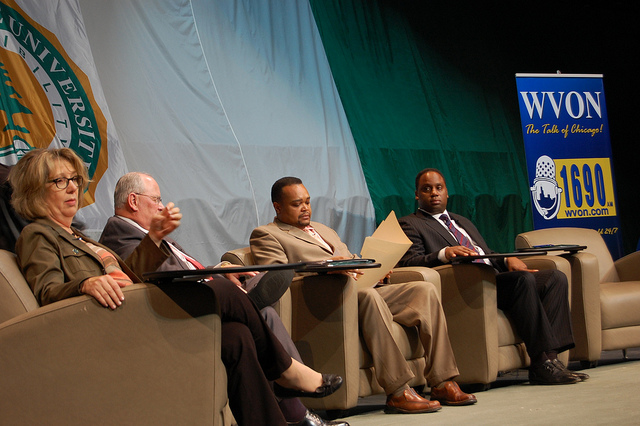
Jonathan Jackson, far right, API forum panelist at WVON in Berwyn, Illinois

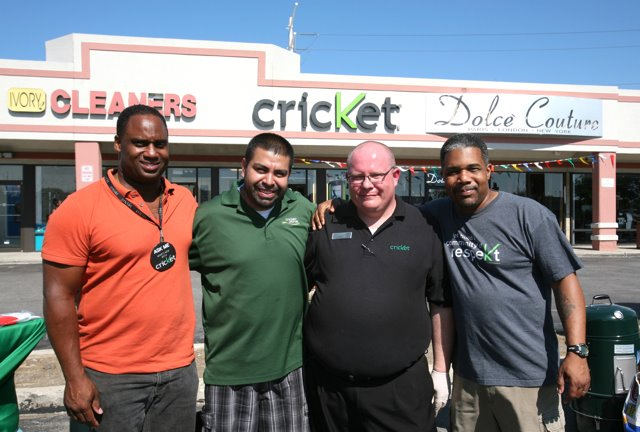
Jonathan Jackson, left in orange, during a cookout at his Cricket Wireless store on 55th Street in Chicago

Jackson started his career in 1988 at Drexel Burnham Lambert as an investment analyst for Michael Milken, an American financier and philanthropist, noted for his role in developing a market for high-yield bonds known as junk bonds. Jackson later worked as an analyst at Independence Bank, was a Shatkin Arbor runner at the Chicago Board of Trade, and developed real estate for East Lake Management in Chicago. He rejoined Milken at Knowledge Universe in the late 1990s and engages in investments in the wireless, real estate and distribution sectors.

In 1998, Jackson, with his brother Yusef, became owners of a Anheuser-Busch distributorship–River North Sales and Service, LLC in Chicago. The deal was met with charges of skepticism and nepotism because Jackson's father had organized a boycott of the brewery's products in the early 1980s. The elder Jackson wanted the brewery to do more business in the African-American community.

In 2009, Jackson led a group of minority investors in a $250 million bid to buy ION Media Networks, the country's largest chain of independent TV stations. Partnered with Cyrus Capital Partners, an investment firm in Manhattan, New York, he said that second-lien lenders are treated as second-class citizens. He has taught finance and entrepreneurship at City Colleges of Chicago and is a business professor at Chicago State University in Chicago.

On August 8, 2012, New York Post writer Tara Palmeri said that an unnamed source close to the Jackson family claimed Jonathan Jackson was being primed to take his brother's place in Congress. In a follow-up to reports about Jesse Jackson Jr.'s treatment at the Mayo Clinic for depression and gastrointestinal disorders, the Post said Jesse Jackson Jr. was "laying the groundwork" for Jonathan to run in the November election if Jesse Jr. "is not up to running for reelection." The elder Jackson, according to the Post, has denied laying the table for Jonathan. In addition to teaching a full load at Chicago State, at the time Jonathan was a businessman focused on building his Cricket Wireless franchise operation.

== U.S. House of Representatives (2023–present) ==
=== Elections ===
==== 2022 ====
In February 2022, Jackson announced his candidacy to represent Illinois's 1st congressional district after the incumbent, Bobby Rush, announced a month before that he was retiring. Campaigning as a progressive, he was endorsed by Bernie Sanders and other figures in the progressive wing of his party. He won a crowded Democratic primary with approximately 30% of the vote, and later easily the general election as expected in this heavily Democratic seat.

==== 2024 ====
Jackson ran unopposed in the Democratic primary. He defeated Republican Marcus Lewis in the general election, receiving 65.8% of the vote.

On November 10, 2026, Jackson missed the House vote on the impeachment of Pete Hegseth as Secretary of Defense. Jackson claimed that a traffic jam prevented him from voting, though he was observed by a journalist on the Capitol grounds before the vote.

=== Current committee assignments ===
For the 119th Congress:

- Committee on Agriculture
  - Subcommittee on Commodity Markets, Digital Assets, and Rural Development
  - Subcommittee on Nutrition and Foreign Agriculture
- Committee on Foreign Affairs
  - Subcommittee on Africa
  - Subcommittee on Western Hemisphere

=== Caucus memberships ===
- Black Maternal Health Caucus
- Congressional Progressive Caucus
- Congressional Black Caucus
- Congressional Caucus for the Equal Rights Amendment

== Electoral history ==
=== 2022 ===
Illinois 1st Congressional District Democratic Primary, 2022
Party	Candidate	Votes	%
Democratic	Jonathan Jackson	21,607	28.2
Democratic	Pat Dowell	14,594	19.0
Democratic	Karin Norington-Reaves	10,825	14.1
Democratic	Jacqueline Collins	9,299	12.1
Democratic	Chris Butler	4,141	5.4
Democratic	Jahmal Cole	4,045	5.3
Democratic	Jonathan Swain	2,554	3.3
Democratic	Michael Thompson	1,680	2.2
Democratic	Charise A. Williams	1,601	2.1
Democratic	Cassandra Goodrum	1,422	1.9
Democratic	Marcus Lewis	901	1.2
Democratic	Robert Palmer	899	1.2
Democratic	Nykea Pippion McGriff	892	1.2
Democratic	Terre Layng Rosner	780	1.0
Democratic	Ameena Matthews	686	0.9
Democratic	Kirby Birgans	511	0.7
Democratic	Steven DeJoie	251	0.3
Total votes		76,688	100.0

Illinois 1st Congressional District General Election, 2022
Party	Candidate	Votes	%
Democratic	Jonathan Jackson	159,142	67.0
Republican	Eric Carlson	78,258	33.0
Write-in		25	0.0
Total votes		237,425	100.0

=== 2024 ===
Illinois 1st congressional district election, 2024
Party	Candidate	Votes	%
Democratic	Jonathan Jackson (incumbent)	208,398	65.8
Republican	Marcus Lewis	108,064	34.1
Write-in		45	0.0
Total votes		316,507	100.0

== Personal life ==
Jackson and Marilyn Ann Richards of Brooklyn, New York married in 1995. Their children are Jonathan T. Jackson, Leah Jackson, and Noah Jackson.

== See also ==
- List of African-American United States representatives

U.S. House of Representatives
Preceded by Bobby Rush	Member of the U.S. House of Representatives from Illinois's 1st congressional district 2023–present	Incumbent
U.S. order of precedence (ceremonial)
Preceded by Glenn Ivey	United States representatives by seniority 318th	Succeeded by John James
