= Donne Trotter =

American politician (born 1950)

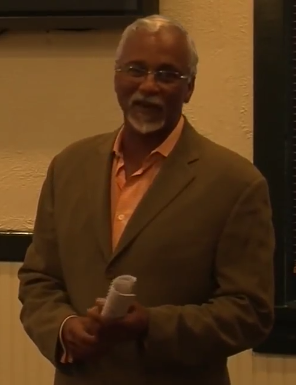

Member of the Illinois Senate
- In office January 13, 1993 – January 19, 2018
- Preceded by: Ethel Skyles Alexander
- Succeeded by: Elgie Sims
- Constituency: 16th district (1993–2003); 17th district (2003–2018)

Member of the Illinois House of Representatives from the 25th district
- In office December 1, 1988 – January 13, 1993
- Preceded by: Carol Moseley Braun
- Succeeded by: Barbara Flynn Currie

Personal details
- Born: January 30, 1950 (age 76) Cairo, Illinois
- Party: Democratic
- Spouse: Rose Trotter
- Children: Four
- Education: Chicago State University (B.A.); Loyola University (M.J.)
- Profession: Hospital Administrator

Donne Trotter (born January 30, 1950) is a former Democratic Party member of the Illinois Senate, representing 16th district from 1993 to 2003 and the 17th district from 2003 to 2018. Previously, he was a member of the Illinois House of Representatives from 1988 through 1993. On January 19, 2018, Trotter announced his retirement from the Illinois Senate.

== Early life ==
Trotter was born in Cairo, Illinois, but is a lifelong resident of Chicago. He attended the University of Arizona and Chicago State University where he earned his bachelor's degree in History and Political Science. He went on to earn his Masters in Health Administration and Law from Loyola University Chicago School of Law. His first political experience was as a voter registrar for Ralph Metcalfe in 1974.

== Illinois Senate ==
As a senator, he sponsored legislation that would allow adults to purchase sterile syringes from pharmacies without a prescription. He co-sponsored a bill that allows individuals to file a petition asking for their personal police record to be sealed after which no one would have access to the records except law enforcement agencies.

Trotter worked to provide health care to low-income families. He fought to include funding in the state budget for the FamilyCare program, which provides health insurance to the parents of children enrolled in KidCare.

In 2001, Trotter sponsored and passed the law that created the Abandoned Newborn Infant Protection Act. The legislation provides that birth parents may legally leave a newborn at a hospital, fire station, or emergency medical facility. If neither child abuse nor neglect is suspected, no questions are asked.

Trotter is a vocal advocate of gun control laws, having cosponsored 31 bills on the issue.

He served as Assistant Majority Leader during his time in the Illinois Senate.

=== Committee assignments ===
In the 99th General Assembly Senator Trotter is a member of the following committees; Energy and Public Utilities, Appropriations I, Executive, the Committee of the Whole and the Special Committee on Oversight of Medicaid Managed Care. He serves on the Executive Committee's Subcommittee on Governmental Operations and its Subcommittee on Gaming. He is also the vice-chairperson of the Appropriations II committee.

== Congressional campaigns ==
In 2000 Trotter made an unsuccessful bid for the United States House of Representatives in the Illinois's 1st congressional district against Bobby Rush and then-State Senator Barack Obama. Trotter ran for Congress again in 2013 special election in Illinois's 2nd congressional district.

== Arrest ==
On Wednesday, December 5, 2012, Trotter was charged with "attempt to board an aircraft with a weapon", which is normally a Class 4 felony, after Transportation Security Administration agents found a .25 caliber Beretta handgun and magazine loaded with six live rounds, which were in the outer pocket of a garment bag. The incident occurred at Chicago's O'Hare International Airport, as Senator Trotter was attempting to board a flight to Washington, D.C. Trotter was held in police custody pending an appearance in bond court the following day, Thursday, December 6. On December 6, a Cook county judge set bond for Trotter at $25,000. Trotter was released after posting $2,500 bail. Trotter's next court appearance was scheduled for Wednesday, December 12, 2012. The Class 4 felony with which Trotter was charged normally carries a sentencing range of one to three years in prison if he is convicted of that charge, and under U.S. and Illinois laws, conviction of a felony normally prohibits someone, at least for a time (depending upon the seriousness of the felony), from holding public office. However, on Wednesday, April 24, 2013, Thomas Durkin, Trotter's attorney, stated that his client had entered a guilty plea, in a plea deal approved by the judge, to a misdemeanor count of reckless conduct (Trotter allegedly had worked a part-time security job, and had forgotten that the weapon was in a garment bag). The misdemeanor plea allows him to keep his job without fear of impeachment or removal, and the conviction will be stricken if Senator Trotter completes a year of non-reporting court supervision.

Illinois House of Representatives
Preceded by Carol Moseley Braun	Member of the Illinois House of Representatives from the 25th district 1988–1993	Succeeded by Barbara Flynn Currie
Illinois Senate
Preceded by Ethel Skyles Alexander	Member of the Illinois Senate from the 16th district 1993–2003	Succeeded by Jacqueline Y. Collins
Preceded by Lisa Madigan	Member of the Illinois Senate from the 17th district 2003–2018	Succeeded by Elgie Sims
