= Charles Morrow =

Charles Morrow may refer to:

- Charles William Morrow, member of the Legislative Assembly of British Columbia
- Charles Morrow (Illinois politician), member of the Illinois House of Representatives
- Charlie Morrow, American sound artist, composer and performer
