= Jacqueline Jackson =

American author and peace activist (born 1944)

- Born: Jacqueline Lavinia Davis; March 7, 1944 (age 82); Fort Pierce, Florida, U.S.
- Occupations: Author; peace activist
- Notable work: Loving You, Thinking of You, Don't Forget to Pray
- Political party: Democratic
- Spouse: Jesse Jackson (m. 1962; died 2026)
- Children: 5, including Santita, Jesse Jr., Jonathan, and Yusef

Jacqueline Lavinia Jackson (née Davis, later Brown; born March 7, 1944) is an American author and peace activist. She wrote Loving You, Thinking of You, Don't Forget to Pray, a compilation of letters she had sent to her son Jesse Jackson Jr. while he was incarcerated. Married to Jesse Jackson from 1962 until his death in 2026, she has been described by The Los Angeles Times as "elusive, private and largely unknown to the public."

== Early life ==
Jackson was born Jacqueline Lavinia Davis on March 7, 1944, in Fort Pierce, Florida, to Gertrude "Gertie" Davis (March 7, 1927 – July 13, 2017), an "unwed migrant worker who earned 15 cents an hour picking beans." Jackson never saw her father. Her mother married Navy Chief Petty Officer Julius Frances Brown Sr. when Jackson was five, and the family relocated to Newport News, Virginia. In an interview, Jackson stated that she believed her mother to be "too strict" when she was a child. Jackson considered becoming a nun when she was a teenager, but eventually decided not to pursue that path. She has four half-siblings through her mother. According to biographer Marshall Frady's book Jesse, Jackson's maternal grandmother was a prostitute.

Jackson attended Huntington High School in Newport News, Virginia, before entering North Carolina A&T State University, then known as the Agricultural and Technical College of North Carolina. While a student at A&T, she was a civil rights protester. In an interview with the Public Broadcasting Service, she recounted writing a persuasive paper on how China should get a seat in the United Nations. Jackson ended up dropping out of A&T when her first child, Santita, was born.

== Career ==
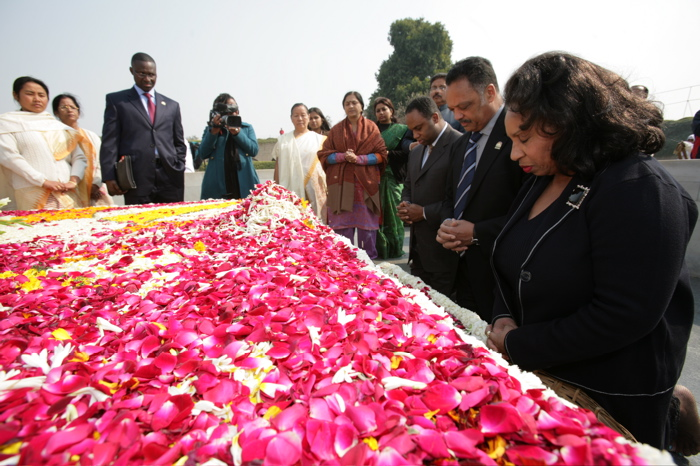
The Jackson family visiting Mahatma Gandhi's grave in India. Jackson appears in the right foreground. To her right is her husband Jesse Jackson.

=== Author ===
In 2013, Jackson's son, Jesse Jr., pleaded guilty to violating federal campaign laws and was incarcerated for 30 months. While her son was in prison, Jackson wrote him a letter daily. After Jesse Jr. was released, Jackson compiled the letters she had sent to him in a book Loving You, Thinking of You, Don't Forget to Pray, which was published by Skyhorse Publishing. To promote the book, Jackson and Jesse Jr. appeared on CBS This Morning and WGN (AM). Salon wrote, "They used their media appearances to discuss criminal justice reform, the moral failures of the penal system and how best to assimilate ex-convicts, especially those who are not former members of Congress, into roles of productive citizenship."

=== Peace activism ===
In 1979, Jackson traveled with activist Jack O'Dell to Beirut to speak to Palestinian leaders, including Yasser Arafat. Writing for Ebony in 1984, journalist Hans Massaquoi stated Jackson was "an eloquent spokesperson for oppressed minorities, including Black women." In 1985, Jackson led a delegation of 10 women to Ethiopia, Sudan, and Somalia for relief efforts during droughts across those countries.

In 2001, Jackson was arrested at Camp Garcia Vieques in Vieques, Puerto Rico with nine other activists for misdemeanor trespassing while protesting the United States Navy's bombing tests in the area. She was ordered to comply with a strip search and body cavity search; while she lifted her breasts and undressed, she would not comply with the body cavity search. Because of the incident, she was placed in solitary confinement. She was held in jail in San Juan for 10 days, refusing to post the $3000 bail. During the stint in jail, she rejected several meals. Jesse came to meet her when she was released. She stated, "This has been a very humiliating experience and dehumanizing experience for me." She received the Peace & Justice Award from Rainbow/PUSH for her efforts during the protest.

Jackson was the recipient of an Honorary Doctor of Humane Letters from North Carolina A&T State University in May 2021 "for a lifetime of dedicated service". She was also, along with her husband, the recipient of a Nigerian chieftaincy title.

=== Politics ===
During her husband Jesse's run for the US presidential nomination on the Democratic ticket in 1984, Jackson spoke at a fundraiser at Howard University, where she stated, "Any woman who cannot vote for Jesse Jackson betrays her own cause." During his run, Jackson insisted the campaign not answer questions about their personal lives. She was criticized for wearing designer attire and for her "extravagant taste in fashion", wearing dresses by Cuban designer Adolfo, American designer Bill Blass, and Greek designer James Galanos.

During the United States presidential election of 2008, Jackson supported Hillary Clinton as the nominee over Barack Obama. Discussing politics on NPR, she said:

"...she's the best person for this country at this time. We have a failing economy at this time. The image of women is at rock bottom. I'm looking for someone to elevate not only the economy, but the image of women. Because I know that women are the nucleus of every society, and whenever a society is failing or on its way out, look at the character, look at the way women are treated, and then you will see what the future holds for our children and that country."

== Personal life ==
Jackson met Jesse during her freshman year at A&T College. On December 31, 1962, in her sophomore year, the 18-year-old Jackson married Jesse at his parents' home. They had five children: Santita (1963), Jesse Jr. (1965), Jonathan Luther (1966), Yusef DuBois (1970), and Jacqueline Lavinia (1975).

According to a 1987 article in the Chicago Tribune, Jackson "held the majority of the family's assets in her name", including stock worth above $250,000 in the Inner City Broadcasting Corporation, an owner of radio stations. She also owned a home with Jesse on the South Side of Chicago worth $100,000. At that time, the family's assets were approximately between $397,000 and $600,000.

In August 2021, Jackson and her husband were hospitalized with COVID-19. She had not been vaccinated. On August 27, Jackson was in the intensive care unit at Northwestern Memorial Hospital while her husband was transferred to a rehabilitation facility. Jackson returned home eight days later. After recovering from COVID-19, she publicly stated that everyone should be getting vaccinated and following CDC guidelines.

Jesse Jackson died on February 17, 2026. During her husband's funeral procession to South Carolina, Jackson fell ill in Nashville, which prevented her from attending her husband's South Carolina services and instead making plans to return to Chicago when released. As of March 1, Jackson remained hospitalized in Nashville. Five days later, Jackson managed to attend her husband's memorial service at Chicago's House of Hope.

== Bibliography ==
- Jackson, Jacqueline; Jackson, Jesse Louis (2019). Loving you, thinking of you, don't forget to pray: letters to my son in prison. New York: Arcade. ISBN 978-1-948924-33-7.
