= Jean Sindab =

International antiracist activist, scholar, and lobbyist

Jean Sindab (October 23, 1944 – January 8, 1996) was an international antiracist activist, scholar, and lobbyist. Sindab was executive director of the Washington Office on Africa from 1980 to 1986, a group that worked on influencing U.S. foreign policy on South Africa and Namibia's apartheid. Sindab was also a consultant for the King Center for Non-Violence and two United Nations agencies: the Council for Namibia and U.N. Centre Against Apartheid. In the late 1980s she moved to Geneva, Switzerland and was executive secretary and co-director of the Programme to Combat Racism of the World Council of Churches.

She returned to the United States briefly as an advisor to Jesse Jackson and the Rainbow Coalition from 1986 through Jackson's 1988 presidential campaign. She returned to the United States for good in 1991 and continued her work with the National Council of the Churches of Christ.

Sindab was concerned with intersectionality and often spoke on the "interdependence between different forms of oppression, in particular race, gender, and class."

== Education ==
Sindab did her undergraduate work at Hunter College. She earned master's degrees in Political Science and International Relations at Yale University, then completed her PhD in Political Science and Human Resources there in 1984. Her dissertation was titled The Impact of Expatriates on Zambian Development.

== Personal life ==
Sindab was born Nellie Jean Pitts in Cleveland, Ohio and was raised in New York City, one of six sisters. She died from breast cancer in 1996. Her papers are held at the Schomburg Center for Research in Black Culture at New York Public Library.
