= Yusef Jackson =

American nonprofit director (born 1970)

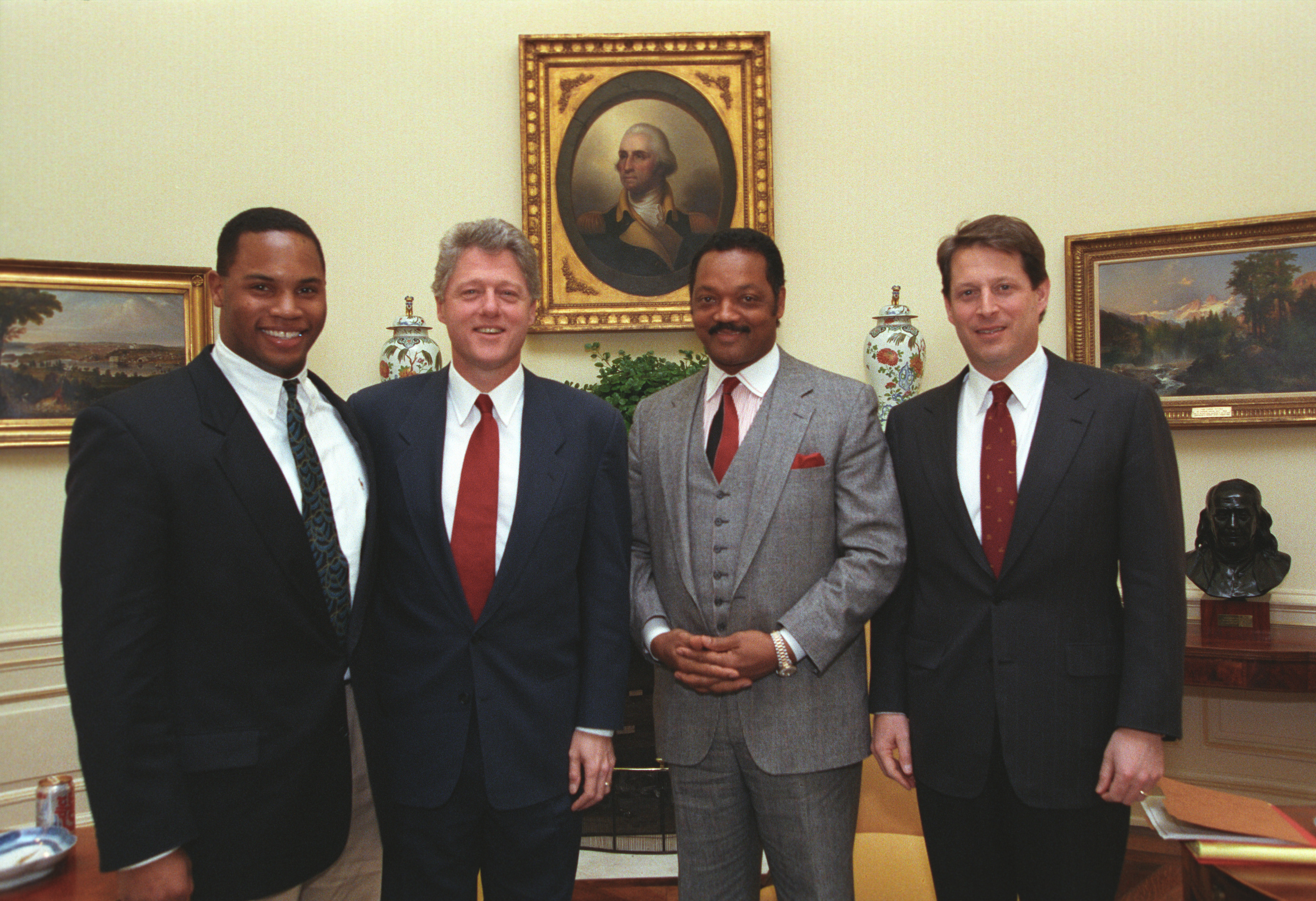
- Yusef (left) with Bill Clinton, Jesse Jackson and Al Gore, 1993.
- Born: Yusef DuBois Jackson; September 26, 1970 (age 55); Chicago, Illinois, U.S.
- Education: University of Virginia
- Occupation: Non-profit director
- Children: 5
- Parents: Jesse Jackson (father); Jacqueline Jackson (mother)
- Relatives: Santita Jackson (sister); Jesse Jackson Jr. (brother); Jonathan Jackson (brother)

Yusef DuBois Jackson (born September 26, 1970) is an American non-profit director from Chicago, Illinois. Jackson is the youngest son of civil rights leader Jesse Jackson and his wife Jacqueline Jackson.

== Early life and education ==
Yusef Jackson is the fourth child of Jacqueline Lavinia Brown Jackson and civil rights leader Rev. Jesse Jackson. Jackson was raised in Chicago along with his siblings Santita, Jesse Jr., Jonathan, and Jacqueline. Yusef earned his juris doctor from the University of Virginia and is a lawyer. He is currently CEO of Rainbow PUSH.

Jackson is a corporate advisor, entrepreneur and investor. He is a founding member and director of the Jackson Legacy Foundation.

== Rainbow/PUSH leadership ==
In July 2023, Rev. Jesse Jackson announced his plans to step down as the leader of Rainbow/PUSH, due to advanced age and health complications. He was succeeded by Dallas minister Frederick Haynes III. In April 2024, Haynes resigned. At the time, Yusef served as Chief Operating Officer and shifted to a greater leadership role in the organization.

In April 2026, two months after the death of his father, Jackson was named president and CEO of Rainbow Push.
