= Charles Skyles =

American politician

Charles Miles Skyles (1905 – 1970) was an American politician.

Born in Little Rock, Arkansas, Skyles moved to Chicago, Illinois in 1917. He went to Wendell Phillips High School. Skyles also went to Garrett–Evangelical Theological Seminary and John Marshall Law School in Chicago. He worked in the Chicago Treasurer office and as an adult probation agent. From 1945 to 1957, Skyles served in the Illinois House of Representatives and was a Democrat. His daughter Ethel Skyles Alexander also served in the Illinois General Assembly.
