= Santita Jackson =

American singer and political commentator (born 1963)

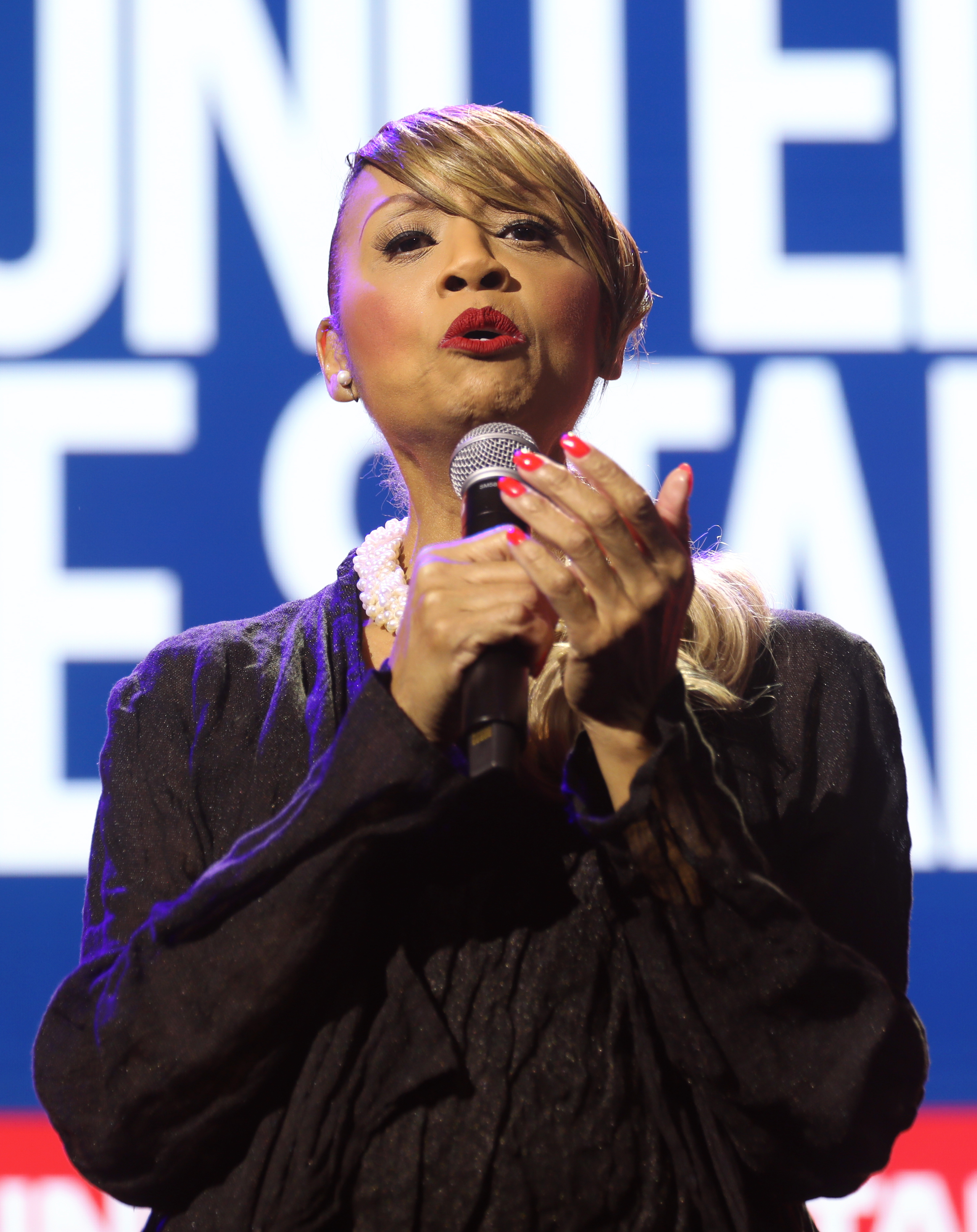
- Jackson in 2024
- Born: July 17, 1963 (age 63); Greensboro, North Carolina, U.S.
- Education: Howard University
- Occupation: Singer
- Parents: Jesse Jackson (father); Jacqueline Jackson (mother)
- Relatives: Jesse Jackson Jr. (brother); Jonathan Jackson (brother); Yusef Jackson (brother)

Santita Jackson (born July 17, 1963) is an American singer and political commentator from Chicago, Illinois. As a singer, Jackson toured with Roberta Flack and performed the National Anthem at President Bill Clinton's second inauguration. She has appeared on the Fox News Channel and is the host of a television show on The Word Network. Santita attended high school with Michelle Obama and served as Obama's maid of honor at her 1992 wedding to Barack Obama.

== Early life and education ==
Jackson was born in Greensboro, North Carolina, in 1963. She is the oldest daughter of Jacqueline Lavinia Brown Jackson and civil rights leader Rev. Jesse Jackson. Jackson was raised in Chicago along with her siblings Jesse Jr., Jonathan, Yusef, and Jacqueline.

Jackson attended John J. Pershing Elementary School and Whitney M. Young Magnet High School in Chicago, where she was a National Merit Scholar. While interviewing for admission to Harvard University, Jackson was criticized by two alumni for her father's political views. Though ultimately accepted to Harvard, she said of the school, "I didn't feel it was the proper environment after that interview." Jackson subsequently attended Howard University on a full merit scholarship. While at Howard University, Jackson became a member of Delta Sigma Theta sorority. Following her time at Howard, Jackson worked as an aide to Illinois congressman Gus Savage.

== Musical career ==
Shortly after college, Jackson moved to New York to pursue a career in music. She spent over five years touring as a backup singer for Roberta Flack, and later performed with the Opera Ebony company.

In 1996, Jackson was asked by the family of Secretary of Commerce Ron Brown to perform at his funeral alongside Wynton Marsalis and the Howard University Chorale. The following year, Jackson performed the National Anthem at Bill Clinton's second presidential inauguration.

In 2009, Jackson released her first recording project, Put Your Arms Around the World, a collaboration with songwriter Janice Kapp Perry, vocalist Chris Willis, and Utah Senator Orrin Hatch.

== Political commentary ==
=== Television and radio ===
In April 2012, Jackson began working as a political commentator on the Fox News Channel. She also hosts her own television show on The Word Network. Earlier, Jackson produced her father's show "Upfront with Jesse Jackson" on The Word Network.

Jackson is the writer, co-host, and executive producer of the nationally syndicated radio show "Keep Hope Alive with Rev. Jesse Jackson." She previously hosted The Santita Jackson Show on Chicago's WVON 1690 AM.

=== Other media ===
Jackson is a founding contributor at TheGrio, an MSNBC website dedicated to African American news and opinion.
