= Charles Chew =

American politician

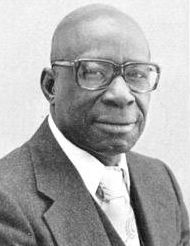

Member of the Illinois Senate from the 16th district 29th district
- In office January 4, 1967 – July 3, 1986
- Preceded by: N/A (redistricted)
- Succeeded by: Ethel Skyles Alexander

Personal details
- Born: October 9, 1922 Greenville, Mississippi
- Died: July 3, 1986 (aged 63) Chicago
- Party: Democratic
- Education: Tuskegee University; Harvard University

Charles Chew Jr. (October 9, 1922 – July 3, 1986) was an American politician in Illinois. He served in the Illinois Senate from 1967 to 1986.

Born in Greenville, Mississippi, Chew served in the United States Navy during World War II. He went to Tuskegee University and Harvard University. Chew served on the Chicago City Council and was a Democrat. He worked as an administrative assistant in community relations in the Cook County Sheriff office. Chew served in the Illinois Senate from 1967 until his death in 1986. He led the Illinois Legislative Black Caucus alongside Carol Moseley Braun. Chew died in a hospital in Chicago, Illinois from throat cancer.
