= Milton Patterson =

American politician

Member of the Illinois House of Representatives from the 32nd district
- In office January 2005 – January 2009
- Preceded by: Charles Morrow
- Succeeded by: Andre Thapedi

Personal details
- Party: Democratic
- Education: Southern Illinois University (B.S.); University of Illinois (M.P.A.)

Milton "Milt" Patterson is a former Democratic member of the Illinois House of Representatives, representing the 32nd District on the southwest side of Chicago from 2005 until 2009.

Patterson earned a Bachelor of Science with honors in fire science and fire protection engineering from Southern Illinois University Carbondale, and a master of public administration from University of Illinois at Chicago where he also has done postgraduate study in electrical engineering. He taught circuit analysis and electrical design, and served as Chief Electrical Inspector and Deputy Commissioner of the Chicago Department of Buildings. He also taught courses at Kennedy-King College for a time.

In the 2004 Democratic primary, Patterson defeated seventeen-year incumbent Charles Morrow to represent the 32nd district. The 32nd district at the time included parts of the Greater Grand Crossing, Englewood, West Englewood, Chicago Lawn, Ashburn, and West Lawn.

During the 94th General Assembly, Patterson served on the following committees: Appropriations-Public Safety; Computer Technology; Electric Utility Oversight; Housing and Urban Development. During the 95th General Assembly, Patterson served as the Vice Chair of the Committee on Computer Technology.

On January 9, 2009, Patterson was the lone House vote (114–1) against impeaching Governor Rod Blagojevich on corruption charges and committing abuses of power. In the roll call, Patterson said he didn't feel it was his job to vote to impeach the governor. He declined to comment on whether he approved of Blagojevich's performance. Patterson defended his vote against impeachment by stating that "I have no firsthand knowledge of any of the evidence," "I went by my own gut feeling, as simple as that," and also that "I read the report. If the government is going to indict him, let them go ahead and do that. That's their job and I'm doing my job."

After suffering a stroke, Patterson chose to retire and was succeeded by fellow Democrat Andre Thapedi.
