= Lisa Davis (politician) =

American politician

Member of the Illinois House of Representatives from the 32nd district
- Incumbent
- Assumed office January 8, 2025
- Preceded by: Cyril Nichols

Personal details
- Party: Democratic
- Website: www.lisadavisforstaterepresentative.com

Lisa Davis is an American politician. She serves as a Democratic member of the Illinois House of Representatives for District 32 since 2025.
