= Cleopatra Cowley =

American politician

Member-elect of the Illinois House of Representatives from the 34th district
- Assuming office January 2027
- Succeeding: Nicholas Smith

Personal details
- Party: Democratic

Cleopatra Cowley is an American politician. A member of the Democratic Party, she is the member-elect for the 34th district of the Illinois House of Representatives.
