= Constance A. Howard =

American politician (born 1942)

Member of the Illinois House of Representatives from the 34th district 32nd district (1995-2003)
- In office 1995–2012
- Preceded by: Charles G. Morrow III
- Succeeded by: Elgie Sims

Personal details
- Born: December 14, 1942 (age 83) Chicago, Illinois
- Party: Democratic
- Spouse: Philip Jr.
- Profession: business owner

Constance A. Howard (born 1942) is an American politician. She is a former Democratic member of the Illinois House of Representatives, representing the 34th District from 1995 to 2012. In 2008, Howard was named as one of Utne Reader magazine's “50 Visionaries Who Are Changing the World.” She is also a convicted felon.

Originally elected from the 32nd district, her district became the 34th in 2002, following redistricting. She resigned from office in July 2012.

== Federal conviction ==
Federal authorities caught Howard as part of a sweeping FBI probe into Illinois grant money that began in 2010. She had helped found Let's Talk, Let's Test Foundation, a nonprofit organization that sought to educate the black community about HIV/AIDS and provide testing services.

The foundation received $1.7 million in state grant money in 2007. Its executive director, Lloyd Kelly, who also worked as one of Howard's aides, was indicted after spending some of that money on a home, football tickets and alcohol, and to pay for interns at Howard's legislative office.

She had also started a scholarship fund aimed at helping minority students learn digital technology. She hosted an annual golf outing to raise money for it. Prosecutors said she raised about $76,700 between 2003 and 2007 but gave out only $12,500. She spent about $28,000 on personal and political expenses, which she was eventually ordered to pay back as part of her plea deal. It was unclear where the rest of the money went. A contribution mailed to her for one of the golf outings led to the mail fraud charge. Howard was an Illinois House member at the time of the crime.

Confronted with the evidence, Howard waived indictment and pleaded guilty to mail fraud on July 24, 2013. She was sentenced to a term of three months in prison.
