= Ethel Skyles Alexander =

American politician (1925–2016)

Member of the Illinois Senate from the 16th district
- In office July 16, 1986 – January 13, 1993
- Preceded by: Charles Chew
- Succeeded by: Donne Trotter

Member of the Illinois House of Representatives from the 32nd district
- In office January 13, 1983 – July 16, 1986
- Preceded by: Donald Deuster
- Succeeded by: Charles Morrow

Member of the Illinois House of Representatives from the 26th district
- In office January 10, 1979 – January 13, 1983
- Preceded by: Taylor Pouncey
- Succeeded by: Barbara Flynn Currie

Personal details
- Born: Ethel Skyles; January 16, 1925 Chicago, Illinois, US
- Died: September 10, 2016 (aged 91) Chicago, Illinois, US
- Party: Democratic

Ethel Skyles Alexander (January 16, 1925 – September 10, 2016) was a Democratic member of the Illinois House of Representatives and Illinois Senate. She served in four General Assemblies in the House and four General Assemblies in the Senate. Carol Moseley Braun described Alexander as her mentor.

Born in Chicago, Alexander graduated from Englewood High School. She received an associate of arts degree from Loop College (now Harold Washington College). She also took an IBM Executive Training Course there. She worked in the Cook County, Illinois Circuit Court office for 33 years. Her father, Charles Skyles, had served in the Illinois General Assembly.

== Political career ==
From 1979 to 1986, Alexander served in the Illinois House of Representatives as a Democrat. She represented the 26th House District in the 81st and 82nd General Assemblies (1979–1983); following the 1981 redistricting, she represented the 32nd House District in the 83rd and 84th General Assemblies (1983–1987). In 1985 she became chair of the House Elections Committee.

On July 16, 1986, Alexander was appointed to the Illinois Senate to replace Charles Chew, who died while in office. She served in the Senate until 1993. In the 85th General Assembly (1987–1989), she became vice-chair of the Senate Elections and Redistricting Committee. In the 86th and 87th General Assemblies (1989–1993), she chaired the committee. Alexander was known for her work to strengthen laws against child pornography and to compel state agencies to boycott apartheid-era South Africa.

She served as the Democratic ward committeewoman for Chicago's 20th ward for a period of time. Alexander took over the position from longtime ward committeeman Cecil Partee after Partee was appointed Cook County State's Attorney in 1989. In 1992, she was one of only two women serving as ward committeemen in Chicago. She lost the position to Alderwoman Arenda Troutman in the 1992 Democratic primary.

Alexander died in Chicago in 2016, aged 91. The Illinois House and Senate passed a joint resolution mourning her death.
