= Andre Thapedi =

American politician

André Thapedi

Member of the Illinois House of Representatives from the 32nd district
- In office January 12, 2009 – March 17, 2021
- Preceded by: Milton Patterson
- Succeeded by: Cyril Nichols

Personal details
- Party: Democratic
- Education: Morehouse College (B.A.); John Marshall Law School (J.D.)
- Profession: Attorney; Real estate broker

André Thapedi was a Democratic member of the Illinois House of Representatives, representing the 32nd District from 2009 to 2021. During his tenure, the 32nd district included all or portions of Auburn Gresham, Chicago Lawn, Ashburn, Chatham and West Englewood as well as portions of suburban Justice and Hickory Hills.

== Early life and career ==
Thapedi is the son of Chicago neurosurgeon Isaac Martin Thapedi and retired Cook County judge Llwellyn Thapedi. He attended LeMans Academy and St. Ignatius College Prep where he was a student athlete, leader, and selected as a "Chicagoland Outstanding Student". After graduating from Morehouse College he earned a law degree, with honors, from John Marshall Law School, where he was a president of the Black Law Students Association, national mock trial competition winner, national moot court competition winner, and published in their Journal of Computer and Information Law.

Thapedi worked as an intern with the office of the Cook County State's Attorney and the law department of the Chicago Transit Authority. He spent eight years as a trial, corporate, and transaction attorney before becoming a partner in the law firm of Thapedi & Thapedi where he represents both injured persons and businesses in civil litigation. He is also the managing broker for Shore Realty, LLC.

== Illinois House of Representatives ==
Thapedi was elected in 2008 to succeed Milton Patterson. On July 31, 2017, Thapedi was appointed a member of the Trade Policy Task Force for a term ending December 31, 2018. The Trade Policy Task Force's function is to analyze important issues relative to the growth of international trade and make recommendations to Congress, the United States Trade Representative, and the White House National Trade Council regarding trade policy. The Task Force also promotes Illinois as a market for exporting and importing.

On January 31, 2021, it was reported by NPR that Thapedi would resign his seat during the 102nd General Assembly. Thapedi submitted his resignation March 17, 2021. On April 8, 2021, Cyril Nichols was appointed by Democratic leaders in the district to succeed him.

== Electoral history ==
Illinois 32nd State House District General Election, 2008
Party	Candidate	Votes	%
Democratic	Andre Thapedi	28,779	99.88
Write-in votes	Milton Patterson	36	0.12
Total votes		28,815	100.0

Illinois 32nd State House District Democratic Primary, 2010
Party	Candidate	Votes	%
Democratic	André Thapedi (incumbent)	5,886	61.23
Democratic	Yvette Williams	3,715	38.65
Democratic	Syron M. Smith	12	0.12
Total votes		9,613	100.0

Illinois 32nd State House District General Election, 2010
Party	Candidate	Votes	%
Democratic	André Thapedi (incumbent)	18,396	100.0
Total votes		18,396	100.0

Illinois 32nd State House District Democratic Primary, 2012
Party	Candidate	Votes	%
Democratic	André Thapedi (incumbent)	6,046	74.74
Democratic	Bobby Joe Johnson	2,043	25.26
Total votes		8,089	100.0

Illinois 32nd State House District General Election, 2012
Party	Candidate	Votes	%
Democratic	André Thapedi (incumbent)	29,515	100.0
Total votes		29,515	100.0

Illinois 32nd State House District General Election, 2014
Party	Candidate	Votes	%
Democratic	André Thapedi (incumbent)	19,828	100.0
Total votes		19,828	100.0

Illinois 32nd State House District General Election, 2016
Party	Candidate	Votes	%
Democratic	André Thapedi (incumbent)	29,118	100.0
Total votes		29,118	100.0

Illinois 32nd State House District General Election, 2018
Party	Candidate	Votes	%
Democratic	André Thapedi (incumbent)	22,901	100.0
Total votes		22,901	100.0

Illinois 32nd State House District Democratic Primary, 2020
Party	Candidate	Votes	%
Democratic	André Thapedi (incumbent)	7,824	57.82
Democratic	Ricky Gandhi	5,708	42.18
Total votes		13,532	100.0
