= Charles Morrow (Illinois politician) =

American politician

Charles G. Morrow, III

Member of the Illinois House of Representatives from the 32nd district
- In office July 16, 1986 – January 12, 2005
- Preceded by: Ethel Skyles Alexander
- Succeeded by: Milton Patterson

Personal details
- Born: July 21, 1956 (age 70) Chicago
- Party: Democratic
- Spouse: Sherri Harris
- Education: De La Salle Institute; Illinois Institute of Technology

Charles G. Morrow, III (born July 21, 1956) is a former Democratic member of the Illinois House of Representatives. He represented the 32nd District on the South Side of Chicago.

After graduating from Chicago's De La Salle Institute, Morrow attended the Illinois Institute of Technology.

Morrow was appointed to replace Ethel Skyles Alexander in the 84th House on July 16, 1986.

In the 1988 primary election, Morrow's qualifications for office were challenged by his opponent Melvin Caldwell. The Cook County Board of Elections at first determined that Morrow was not qualified because he was not validly registered to vote, and had been voting under his deceased father's registration; however, on rehearing the Board reversed itself. The case went to the Illinois Court of Appeals, which determined that the Board had no authority to reconsider its decision, and therefore its original decision stood. However, the Court of Appeals allowed Morrow's petition for judicial review of the Board's decision to proceed. Ultimately, Morrow won the election, as he would for many election cycles thereafter.

In his nearly two decades in the state legislature, Morrow chaired the House committees on Economic and Urban Development (1991–1993); Housing, Economic and Urban Development (1993–1995); and Appropriations-Public Safety (1997–2005). He worked to increase the proportion of state funding going to minority contractors and to ensure the state provided funding to repave the Dan Ryan Expressway, which serves the South Side, and to increase the number of African-American contractors employed on the project. He also worked to provide funding for a childcare center at Chicago State University.

Morrow was opposed in the 2004 primary election by Milton Patterson, who was supported by Chicago mayor Richard M. Daley. The Chicago Tribune also backed Patterson, claiming that Morrow had "little to show for having served in the legislature since 1987." Morrow was backed by House Speaker Michael Madigan, but lost to Patterson.
