= My Block, My Hood, My City =

Nonprofit organization in Chicago, IL, US

- Nickname: M3
- Founded at: Chicago, Illinois
- Type: Nonprofit
- Location: USA
- Website: https://www.formyblock.org/

My Block, My Hood, My City, also known as M3, is a non-profit organization in Chicago that mentors underprivileged youth through educational programs and field trips. The organization focuses on providing opportunities in STEM, arts & culture, citizenry & volunteerism, health, community development, culinary arts, and entrepreneurship.

== Background ==
My Block, My Hood, My City was founded in 2013 by Jahmal Cole. The idea to create the organization stemmed from Cole's memory of taking a bus from North Chicago to Texas, in which he realized the diversity of the country. While volunteering at the Cook County Juvenile Detention Center, Cole noticed the lack of exposure detainees from the South and West sides of Chicago had of other neighborhoods, which also motivated him to start the organization.

In addition to founding M3, Cole has received several awards and recognition including the Chicago Ideas Award by Mayor Rahm Emanuel in 2011, a certificate by the Illinois Office of Volunteerism and Community Service in 2012, and the Chicago Urban League Award in 2016. He has also written several books about disparities in Chicago neighborhoods, with his most recent one titled It's Not Regular. He currently resides in the Chatham neighborhood of Chicago with his wife and daughter.

== Demographics ==
My Block, My Hood, My City caters mainly to teens from the South and West sides of Chicago, although a version of the Explorers' Program has been offered to adults in the past. The nonprofit aims to serve students from neighborhoods with high rates of crime and poverty, such as Englewood. Many of the organization's fundraising efforts benefit the larger Chicago community, including micro-grants given to community leaders and donations to Black-owned businesses.

== Programs ==
=== Explorers' Program ===
Children from underprivileged neighborhoods are given tours of different parts of the city to explore Chicago's culture. Field trips include sailing, cooking, or attending art museums. Most field trips, however, are focused on entrepreneurship, and cost about $1,500 each. When the Explorer's Program first launched in 2016, 75 teens participated in field trips across the city. Currently, the program serves 150 teens per year for a total of 10 explorations. Students are selected to join the Explorers' program based on recommendations from school officials, especially those with low attendance rates.

Additionally, the youth-led scooter tour program was created in 2018 to provide summer jobs for young people as tour guides of the west side Chicago neighborhoods. During these tours, attendees are led around North Lawndale to visit historical sites and local spots. The program is run by Nathaniel Viets-VanLear, the program manager of My Block, My Hood, My City.

=== Youth-Senior Connect ===
The Youth-Senior Connect program was created in 2020 to help teens and young adults who are aiming to work in the medical field. The program connects them with the city's elderly as a summer job to serve as care-takers and deliver groceries. My Block, My Hood, My City received 2,500 requests from seniors for help.

In response to the COVID-19 pandemic, My Block, My Hood, My City hosted drives to collect PPE for the city's elderly. Each of the 1,000 safety kits that were assembled and delivered included two masks, hand sanitizer, and five pairs of latex gloves.

== Fundraisers and grants ==
M3 is funded primarily through online sales of merchandise such as hoodies and t-shirts. These merchandise sales contribute about $50,000 to M3 each year.

=== Hit the Hood Grant ===
In 2020, My Block, My Hood, My City fundraised $80,000 through their Hit the Hood Grant to help combat violence in Chicago. The grants were distributed in $2,500 micro-grants to community leaders across the city. During the summer of 2020, M3 started the My Community Table fundraiser in which they teamed up with restaurants across the city, with money from takeout meals donated to the grant.

=== Small Business Relief Fund ===
The Small Business Relief Fund started in July 2020 in response to small businesses damaged by COVID-19, looting, or vandalism. More than 230 businesses reached out to M3 for assistance and $1,000,000 was raised in two days for the fund. Donations are submitted online through the My Block, My Hood, My City website and businesses can apply for up to a $7,500 grant. While funds are given to a variety of businesses, this fund primarily focuses on black-owned businesses in the south and west sides of Chicago. With this relief fund, Cole also hopes to train small businesses across Chicago in online commerce and digital marketing.

=== Annual 5K Run ===
In 2019, My Block, My Hood, My City hosted its first 5K run at Marquette Park. Proceeds help fund the Explorers' program. In 2020, the race was held virtually due to the COVID-19 pandemic. In the virtual race, participants chose a run group and were randomly assigned a neighborhood to run in at their own pace.

== Partnerships ==
My Block, My Hood, My City has partnered with black-owned small businesses in the Chicago metropolitan area, including Semicolon Bookstore & Gallery. The Chicago Bulls and Blackhawks also partnered with My Block, My Hood, My City to help clean up Chicago's West Side. Celebrities like Usher have also been seen wearing the organization's merchandise.

The nonprofit group joined forces with My Community Table to raise money for local businesses as well as the organization's #HitTheHood program. My Block, My Hood, My City has also been active in the Black Lives Matter movement. The group organized a rally in Chicago in remembrance of victims of police brutality including Breonna Taylor.

In June 2017, My Block, My Hood, My City helped create virtual tours of Chicago neighborhoods with the help of Google as an extension of the Explorers' Program. My Block, My Hood, My City teens received technological mentorship from Google, and the tech company received virtual reality footage from the teens who lived in Chicago neighborhoods.

== Volunteering ==
My Block, My Hood, My City has been involved in various volunteering opportunities throughout Chicago neighborhoods. They have branched out beyond civic missions and have gathered volunteers to clean up surrounding neighborhoods, including areas like Chatham, Chicago. They have organized volunteers to aid in snow removal in underserved communities. In addition, My Block, My Hood, My City gathered volunteers to help clean up retail stores that were damaged during the George Floyd protests in Chicago and has assembled volunteers to help at the Chicago Farmworks in East Garfield Park to plant and mulch crops in the community garden, in order to someday feed hundreds of people.
