= Illinois Criminal Justice Information Authority =

The Illinois Criminal Justice Information Authority (ICJIA) is a quasi-independent State of Illinois agency that is active in facets of criminal justice other than direct law enforcement. The Authority works with agencies across all sectors of the criminal justice system.

== Description ==
As of 2021, the ICJIA characterizes its work into four silos of responsibility:

- Federal and State grants – The ICJIA, as a quasi-independent agency, is the application instrument of record in applying for financial cash flows to Illinois criminal justice. These cash flows primarily come from the United States Department of Justice and are paid through the CJIA to organizations throughout the state.
- Research and Analysis – The ICJIA is directed to serve as a Statistical Analysis Center for the compilation of reliable statewide criminal justice data. An arm of the ICJIA, the Research and Analysis unit, compiles and tabulates data to gather pictures of arrest and conviction trends and victim services needs.
- Adult Redeploy – The ICJIA is directed to help the Illinois circuit courts reduce burdens on those facets of Illinois criminal law that carry out residential punishment. Local court programs, such as drug court and mental health court, backstopped by professional support personnel who follow professional protocols, can sometimes divert a defendant from being sentenced to jail or prison into a pathway of counseling and community-based health management. The ICJIA provides data-based information services, and some financial assistance, for these support personnel. This, in turn, reduces burdens on the Illinois Department of Corrections and the county jails.
- Family Violence Coordinating Councils – The ICJIA, in a manner similar to Adult Redeploy, provides data support for professionals operating institutional and community responses to family violence and domestic violence in Illinois.

=== Current status ===
The ICJIA was created by the Illinois General Assembly in 1982. The Illinois Criminal Justice Information Act is Illinois statutory law, classified as 20 ILCS 3930. The ICJIA is based in Chicago, Illinois.
