= Cyril Nichols =

American politician

Member of the Illinois House of Representatives from the 32nd district
- In office April 8, 2021 – January 8, 2025
- Preceded by: Andre Thapedi
- Succeeded by: Lisa Davis

Personal details
- Born: Chicago, Illinois, U.S.
- Party: Democratic
- Education: Colby Community College; Columbia College Chicago

Cyril Nichols is a former Democratic member of the Illinois House of Representatives, representing the 32nd district from 2021 to 2025.

Nichols was appointed on April 8, 2021, to fill the seat of former state Representative Andre Thapedi after Thapedi resigned on March 17, 2021. Nichols dropped out of the 2024 Democratic primary for re-nomination, leaving Lisa Davis, an assistant public defender, the sole candidate in the primary.

== Early life, education, and career ==
Nichols is the associate athletics director for City Colleges of Chicago.

As of July 3, 2022, Representative Nichols is a member of the following Illinois House committees:

- Elementary & Secondary Education: Administration, Licensing & Charter Schools (HELO)
- Transportation: Regulation, Roads & Bridges (HTRR)
