= Nicholas Smith (Illinois politician) =

American politician

Nick Smith

Member of the Illinois House of Representatives from the 34th district
- Incumbent
- Assumed office February 18, 2018
- Preceded by: Elgie Sims
- Succeeded by: Cleopatra Cowley (elect)

Personal details
- Born: 1973 or 1974 (age 52–53) Chicago, Illinois, U.S.
- Party: Democratic
- Education: Chicago State University (BS)

Nicholas "Nick" Smith (born 1973/1974) is a Democratic member of the Illinois House of Representatives representing the 34th district. The 34th district includes the Chatham and Roseland neighborhoods in Chicago along with the all or parts of Burnham, Calumet City, Lansing, Ford Heights, Lynwood, Sauk Village, Willowbrook, Beecher, Manteno and Grant Park.

== Early life and career ==
Smith earned a Bachelor of Science in chemistry from Chicago State University in 2000. Prior to his appointment to the Illinois House of Representatives, he served as the Ward Superintendent for Chicago's 9th ward; overseeing all services provided by streets and sanitation in the ward. In 2014, Smith ran for Cook County Board 4th District seat and would finish second in the Democratic primary. He has also worked as a legislative aide to the Chicago City Council Transportation Committee and a community liaison for Chicago State University.

== Illinois House of Representatives ==
Smith was appointed to fill the vacancy left in the legislature when Elgie Sims was elevated to serve in the State Senate. He also serves as a member of the Roseland Community Medical District Commission, which seeks to spur economic development around Roseland Community Hospital. At the start of the 103rd General Assembly, Speaker Chris Welch named Smith the Majority Officer and Sergeant at Arms for the Democratic caucus.

As of July 3, 2022, Representative Smith was a member of the following Illinois House committees:

- Appropriations - Higher Education Committee (HAPI)
- Clean Energy Subcommittee (HENG-CLEA)
- (chairman of) Economic Opportunity & Equity Committee (HECO)
- Energy & Environment Committee (HENG)
- Insurance Committee (HINS)
- International Trade & Commerce Committee (HITC)
- Prescription Drug Affordability Committee (HPDA)

== Electoral history ==
Cook County Board 4th District Commissioner Democratic Primary, 2014
Party	Candidate	Votes	%
Democratic	Stanley S. Moore	2,270	60.55
Democratic	Nicholas "Nick" Smith	873	23.29
Democratic	Robert R. McKay	606	16.16
Total votes		3,749	100.0

Illinois 34th State House District General Election, 2018
Party	Candidate	Votes	%
Democratic	Nicholas "Nick" Smith	31,939	100.0
Total votes		31,939	100.0
