= Elgie Sims =

American politician

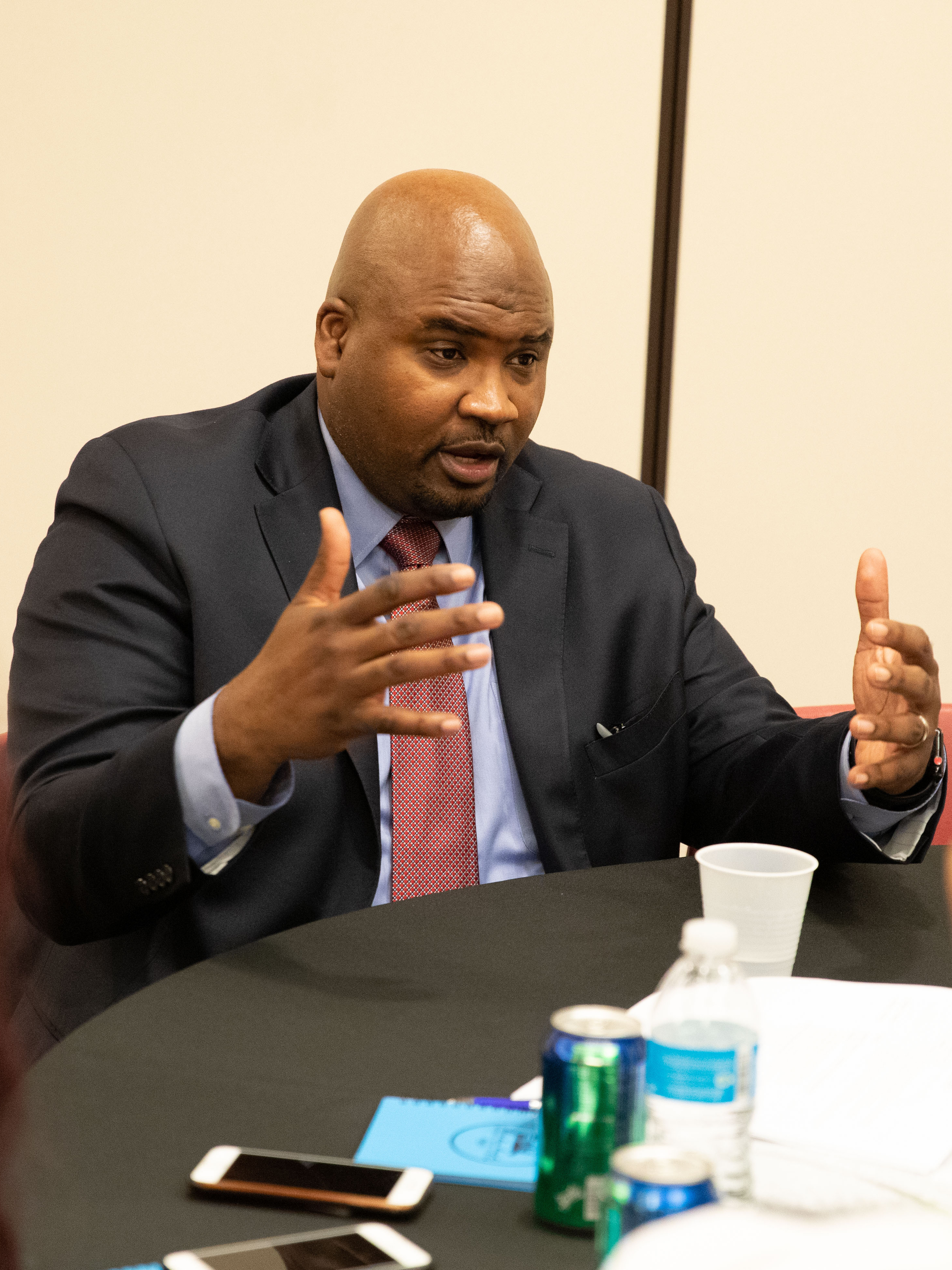

Member of the Illinois Senate from the 17th district
- Incumbent
- Assumed office January 26, 2018
- Preceded by: Donne Trotter

Member of the Illinois House of Representatives from the 34th district
- In office August 3, 2012 – January 26, 2018
- Preceded by: Constance Howard
- Succeeded by: Nick Smith

Personal details
- Born: September 21, 1970 (age 55) Chicago, Illinois, U.S.
- Party: Democratic
- Spouse: Shivonne
- Children: 2
- Education: Illinois State University (BS); University of Illinois, Springfield (MPA); Loyola University Chicago (JD)
- Website: Official website

Elgie R. Sims Jr. is the Illinois state Senator for the 17th district. The 17th district includes the Chatham neighborhoods of Chicago along with all or parts of Burnham, Calumet City, Lansing, Ford Heights, Lynwood, Sauk Village, Beecher, Manteno, and Grant Park.

== Early life and career ==
Sims, a second-generation small business owner who lives in Chicago's Chatham community. He grew up in Chicago's far south side West Pullman neighborhood. Raised Catholic, he graduated from Quigley Preparatory Seminary South High School in Chicago and considered the priesthood. He later matriculated to Illinois State University, where he received his Bachelor of Science degree. He received his start in government while serving as the first African American Student Regent representing Illinois State University to the Board of Regents, the former governing board for Illinois State University, Northern Illinois University, and the former Sangamon State University (now the University of Illinois at Springfield).

Following graduation from Illinois State University, Sims went to work for former Senate President Emil Jones Jr. as a budget analyst, eventually rising to become Appropriations Director. During his service with Jones and the Illinois Senate Democratic Caucus, Sims completed a Master's in Public Administration at the University of Illinois at Springfield. Upon leaving his service with the Illinois Senate Democratic Caucus, Sims started a consulting firm and attended the Loyola University Chicago School of Law, where he earned his Juris Doctor degree and subsequently opened a law firm.

== Electoral history ==
After winning the March 2012 Democratic primary for State Representative of the 34th District and while awaiting the 2012 general election, on August 3, 2012, Sims was appointed to the Illinois House of Representatives to succeed and complete the unexpired term of Constance A. Howard.

On January 26, 2018, Sims was appointed to the Illinois Senate to complete the unexpired term of Donne Trotter following his resignation; he was elected to a full term in the Senate on November 6, 2018. Nicholas Smith was appointed to succeed Sims in the Illinois House and took office on February 3, 2018. Later that year, Sims was elected to serve as the chair of the Council of State Governments’ Midwestern Legislative Conference.

== Illinois House of Representatives ==
During his time in the Illinois House of Representatives, Sims served as chairman of the House Judiciary - Criminal Committee, during which he has concentrated on Criminal Justice Reform. He passed initiatives such as the Police and Community Relations Improvement Act of 2015 and the Bail Reform Act of 2017. He also served on the Illinois State Commission on Criminal Justice and Sentencing Reform. During his service in the Illinois House, Sims served as vice-chairman of the Mass Transit Committee, vice-chairman of the Revenue and Finance Committee, and on the Appropriations-Human Services, Business Growth and Incentives, Business Occupational Licenses, Insurance, Judiciary, and Transportation committees.

== Illinois Senate ==
In the Illinois Senate, Sims continues championing legislation focused on improving the quality of life by improving schools, strengthening the middle class by creating good paying jobs and economic opportunities, bringing fiscal discipline to Springfield, and passing public safety initiatives with the aim of making the streets safer. Sims currently serves as chairman of the Senate's Appropriations Committee, vice-chairman of the Criminal Law Committee, vice-chairman of the Redistricting Committee as well as a member of the Ethics, Judiciary, Public Safety and Revenue committees.

In 2020, Sims led efforts to pass the Criminal Justice, Violence Reduction and Police Accountability pillar of the Illinois Legislative Black Caucus' Anti-Racism Agenda, which culminated in the passage of House Bill 3653, the SAFE-T Act, signed into law by Governor J. B. Pritzker on February 22, 2021.
