= Jacqueline Y. Collins =

American politician

Jacqui Collins
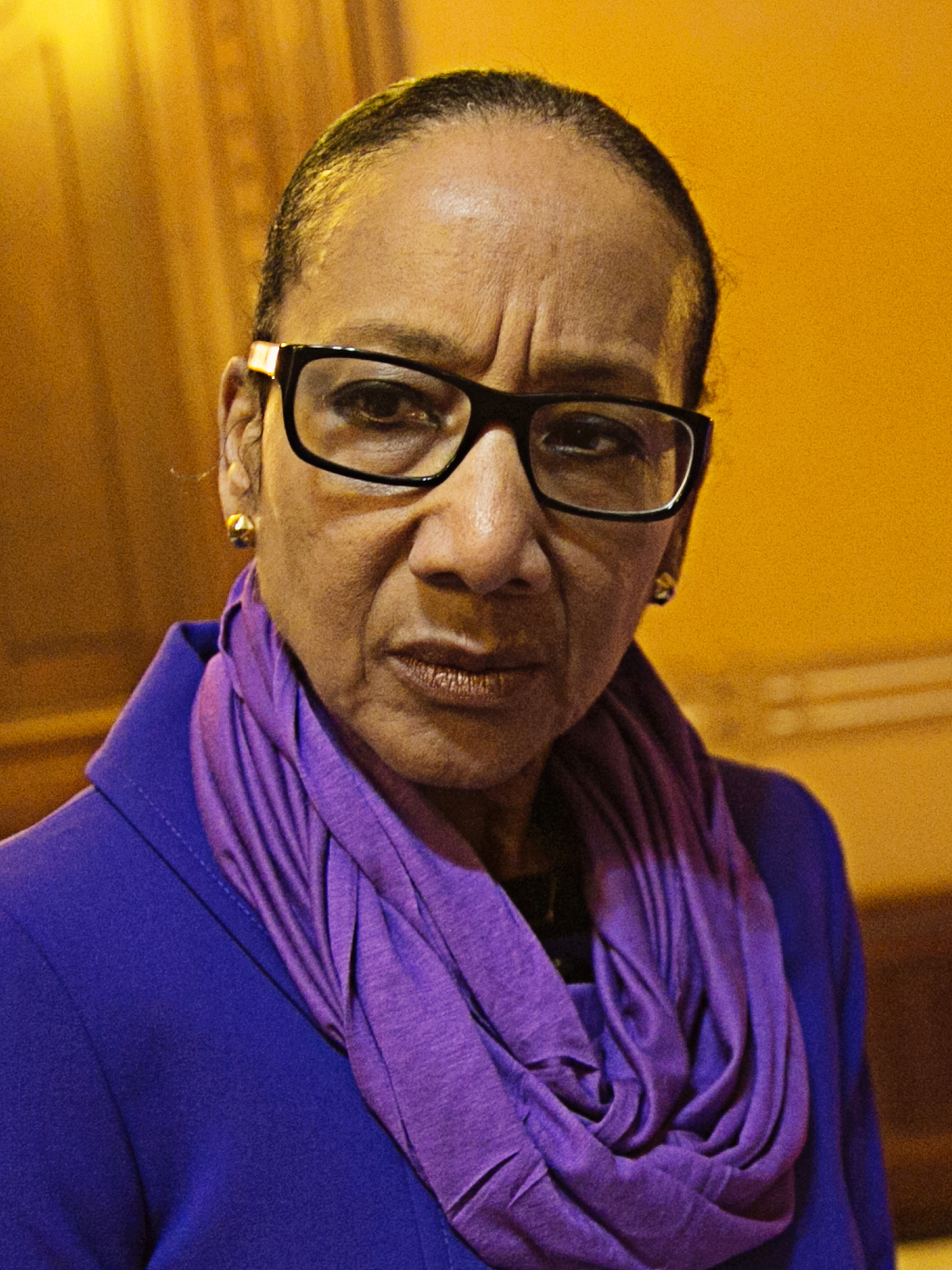

Member of the Illinois Senate from the 16th district
- In office January 8, 2003 – January 11, 2023
- Preceded by: Robert Molaro
- Succeeded by: Willie Preston

Personal details
- Born: December 10, 1949 (age 76) McComb, Mississippi, U.S.
- Party: Democratic
- Education: Northwestern University (BA); Harvard University (MPA, MTS)

Jacqueline Y. Collins She is an American politician who served as a Democratic member of the Illinois Senate, representing the 16th district from 2003 until 2023.

== Early life and education ==
Collins was born in McComb, Mississippi on December 10, 1949 and grew up in the Englewood neighborhood of Chicago. Collins earned her undergraduate degree in journalism from Northwestern University. She then worked for the Citizen Community Newspaper and CBS-TV news.

Collins returned to school when she pursued two concurrent degrees from Harvard University. In June 2001, she received her master's degree in public administration from Harvard Kennedy School. Two years later, she earned her master's degree in theological studies from Harvard’s Divinity School.

== Career ==
Collins worked on the massive voter registration drive that helped elect Harold Washington. In 1984, Collins served as a press liaison for the Reverend Jesse Jackson during the Democratic National Convention and as a press secretary to Congressman Gus Savage.

From 1987 to 1999, Collins volunteered as Minister of Communications for St. Sabina Catholic Church. During this time, the church launched a large scale public awareness campaign against alcohol and tobacco companies, and advertising agencies that targeted inner city neighborhoods. As a result of this campaign, the Chicago City Council passed an ordinance banning alcohol and tobacco billboards in the city.

In the summer of 2001, Collins worked as a Legislative Fellow for Senator Hillary Clinton in Washington, D.C.

On May 19, 2023, the Illinois Senate confirmed Collins to the Illinois Human Rights Commission.

=== Illinois Senate ===
Collins was elected to the Illinois Senate in 2002. She highlights her work to extend limitations for civil and criminal prosecution of sex crimes against children; legislation allowing more Illinois senior citizens to qualify for the Homestead Exemption based on the number of days they lived at their residence; and a resolution creating a 17-member commission to study and document racial and gender discrimination in hiring or contracting on state public construction projects.

Collins authored and sponsored legislation, passed by the state government, that would prohibit Illinois state investment in companies doing business in the Republic of the Sudan. The legislation was the first of its kind in the United States, and has been used as a model for six similar bills.

Collins was a member of the Governor’s Racial Profiling Task Force and the Governor’s Statewide Community Safety Re-entry commission which deals with reducing recidivism amongst individuals recently paroled from Illinois correctional facilities.

As of July 2022, Collins was a member of the following Illinois Senate committee:

- Appropriations - Government Infrastructure (SAPP-SAGI)
- Appropriations - Judiciary Committee (SAPP-SAJU)
- (Chairwoman of) Criminal Law Committee (SCCL)
- Financial Institutions Committee (SFIC)
- Redistricting - Chicago South Committee (SRED-SRCS)
- Transportation Committee (STRN)

Collins consistently votes against gaming legislation.

Collins served as a delegate to the 2012 Democratic National Convention.

== Personal life ==
Collins is Catholic and received an endorsement for her 2022 campaign for Congress from her pastor, Fr Michael Pfleger.
