= Rainbow/PUSH =

American non-profit organization

- Formation: 1971
- Type: Civil rights
- Headquarters: Chicago, Illinois
- Location: United States
- Official language: English
- Founder: Jesse Jackson
- President and CEO: Yusef Jackson
- Website: rainbowpush.org

Rainbow/PUSH is an American nonprofit organization formed as a merger of two nonprofit organizations founded by Jesse Jackson: Operation PUSH (People United to Save Humanity) and the National Rainbow Coalition. The organizations pursue social justice, civil rights, and political activism.

In December 1971, Jackson resigned from Operation Breadbasket after clashing with Ralph Abernathy and founded Operation PUSH. In 1984, Jackson founded the National Rainbow Coalition. It merged with PUSH in 1996. The combined organization's national headquarters is on the South Side of Chicago and it has regional branches in Washington, D.C., New York City, Los Angeles, Detroit, Houston, Atlanta, Silicon Valley, New Orleans, and Boston.

Operation PUSH raised public awareness to initiate corporate action and government sponsorship. The National Rainbow Coalition became a prominent political organization that raised public awareness of numerous political issues and consolidated a large voting bloc. The merged entity has undertaken numerous social initiatives.

== PUSH ==
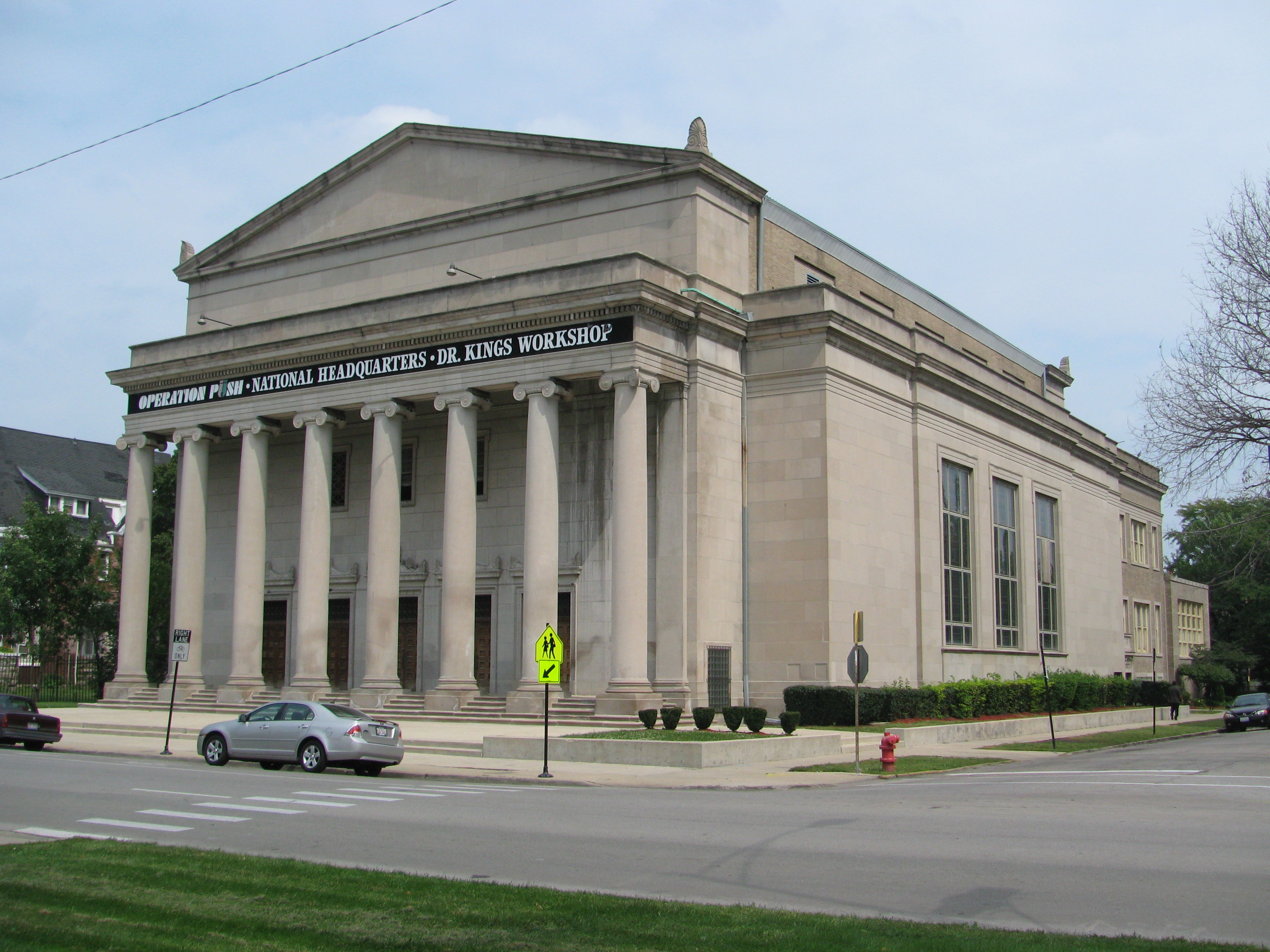
The Rainbow/PUSH Headquarters in the Kenwood community area of Chicago

Operation PUSH, an acronym for People United to Save (later Serve) Humanity, was an organization that advocated black self-help and achieved a broad audience for its liberal stances on social justice and civil rights.

Operation PUSH's origins can be traced to a factional split in Operation Breadbasket, an affiliate of the Southern Christian Leadership Conference. In 1966, Martin Luther King Jr., the head of the SCLC, appointed Jackson to head the Chicago chapter of Operation Breadbasket, which became a coalition of black ministers and entrepreneurs.

After 1968, Jackson increasingly clashed with King's successor at SCLC, Ralph Abernathy. The break became complete in December 1971 when Abernathy suspended Jackson for "administrative improprieties and repeated acts of violation of organizational policy." Jackson resigned from Operation Breadbasket, called together his allies, and formed Operation PUSH.

From its inception, Jackson called its membership a "Rainbow Coalition". This concept and phrase was originally created by the 1968 Chicago Black Panther leader Fred Hampton. Hampton used it to describe the multiethnic revolutionary federation he founded. Jackson was not part of Hampton's Rainbow Coalition, and had a difficult relationship with the Panthers. Some former members of Hampton's coalition resent Jackson for using the name, partly because Jackson's politics are reformist, and partly because Jackson copyrighted the name, preventing others from using it.

Although money was a problem at first, initial backing came from Manhattan Borough President Percy Sutton, Gary, Indiana Mayor Richard Hatcher, Aretha Franklin, Jim Brown, and Ossie Davis.

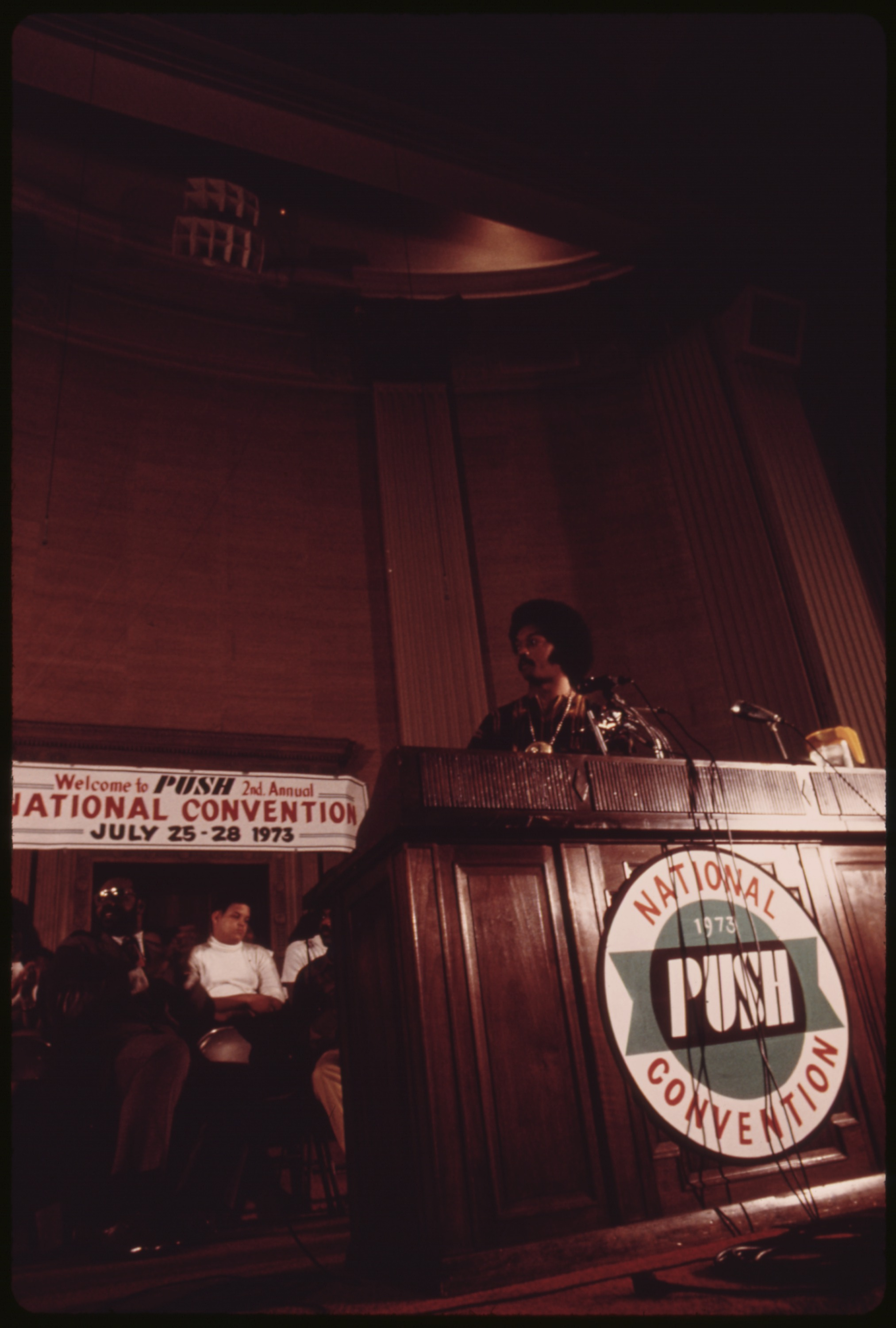
Jesse Jackson speaks at 1973 PUSH National Convention

The organizational meeting of PUSH was in the Chicago home of T.R.M. Howard, a prominent black doctor and community leader on the South Side. Before he moved to Chicago in 1956, Howard developed a national reputation as a Mississippi civil rights leader, surgeon, and entrepreneur. He served on PUSH's board of directors and chaired the finance committee.

Through PUSH Jackson was able to continue pursuing the same economic objectives that Operation Breadbasket had. In addition, his organization expanded into social and political development for blacks in Chicago and nationwide. The 1970s saw various tactics to pursue the organization's objectives including direct action campaigns, weekly radio broadcasts, and awards, through which Jackson protected black homeowners, workers, and businesses, and honored prominent blacks in the US and abroad.

Jackson also started a campaign against legalizing abortion after Roe v. Wade was decided in 1973. PUSH was concerned with minority youth reading, and championed education through PUSH-Excel, a spin-off program that emphasized keeping inner-city youths in school while assisting them with job placement. The program, which persuaded inner-city youth to pledge in writing to study two hours per night and involved parental monitoring, impressed Jimmy Carter, whose administration became a large sponsor after Secretary of Health, Education, and Welfare Joseph Califano and Secretary of Labor Ray Marshall courted Jackson.

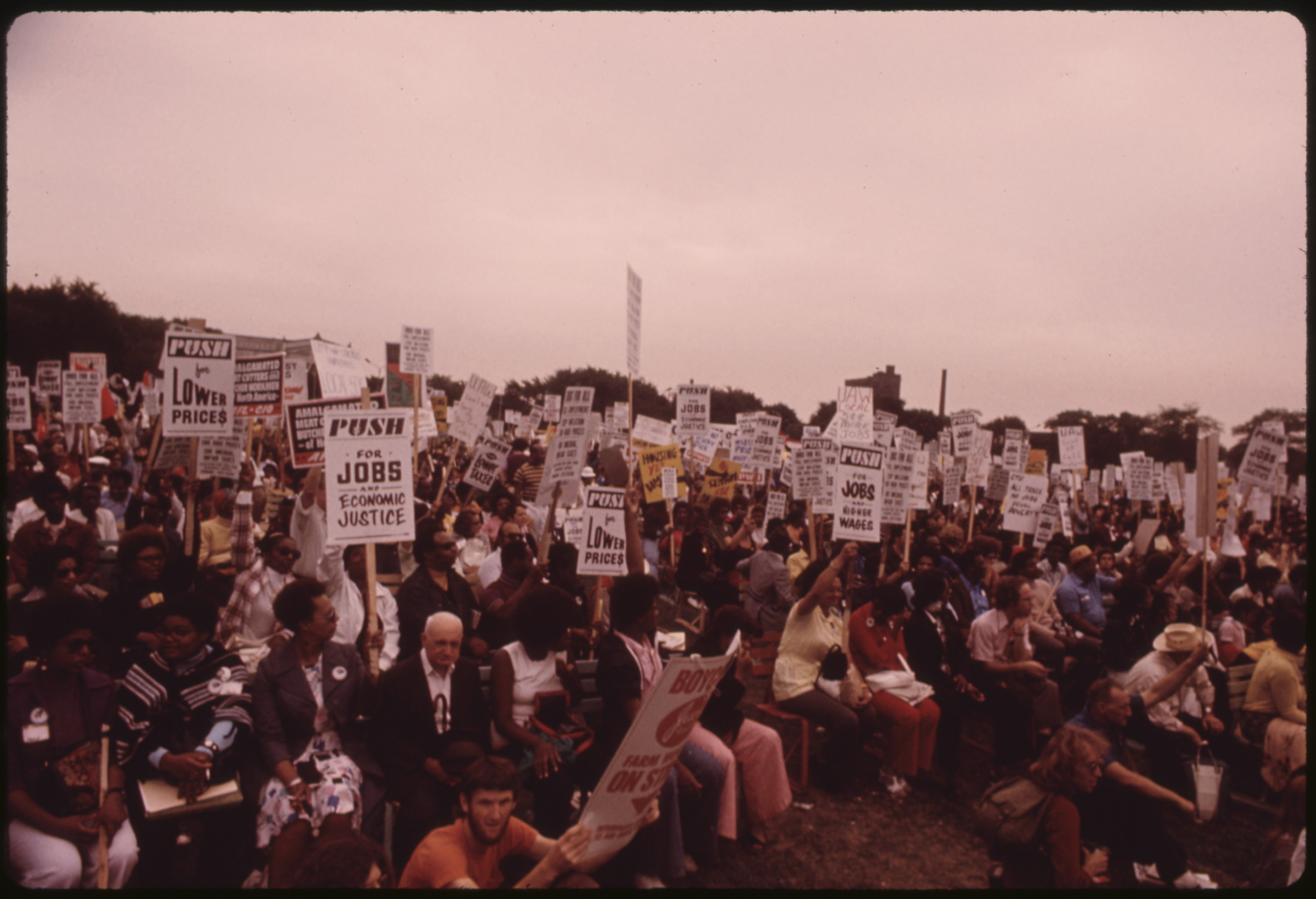
Lake Shore Drive Senior Citizens March (July 1973)

The organization was very successful at committing major corporations with large presences in the black community to adopt affirmative action programs in which they hired more black executives and supervisors and to buy from black suppliers, wholesalers, and distributors. The organization employed prayer vigils to call attention to issues. It opposed Ronald Reagan's workfare initiative requiring that welfare recipients work for part of their benefits.

The organization staged several boycotts, including early 1980s boycotts of Anheuser Busch and Coca-Cola as well as a 1986 boycott of CBS television affiliates. The boycotts became so well known that at one point David Duke supporters referred to a boycott of Nike, Inc. as oppression of whites by blacks. Nike spokesperson Michael Jordan disavowed the boycott. The boycotts of Budweiser and Coke as well as one against Kentucky Fried Chicken were touted for having won minority job concessions from white businesses.

== National Rainbow Coalition ==
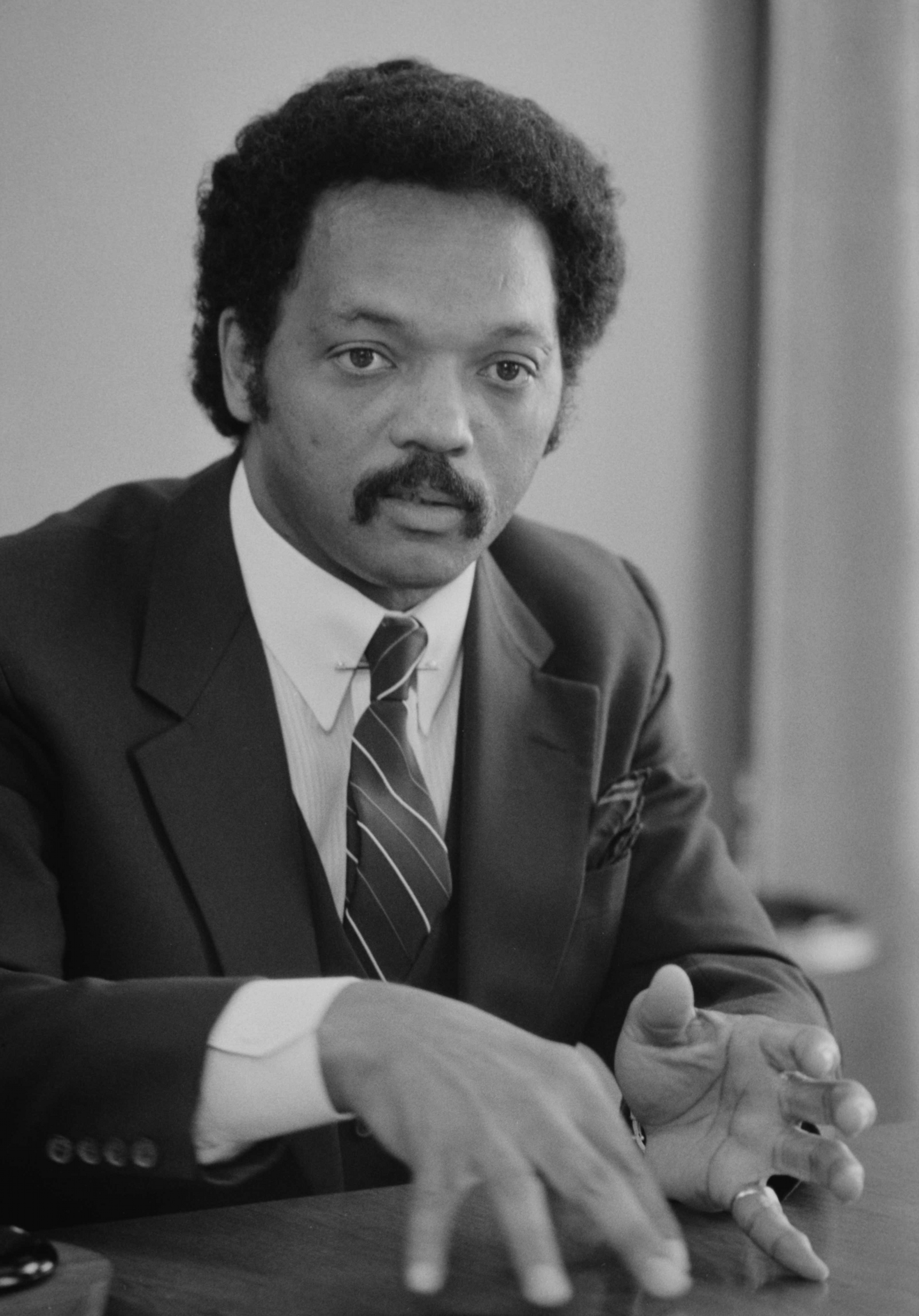
Jesse Jackson was a presidential candidate in both 1984 and 1988.

The National Rainbow Coalition (Rainbow Coalition for short) was a political organization that grew out of Jesse Jackson's 1984 presidential campaign. During the campaign, Jackson began speaking about a "Rainbow Coalition", an idea created by Fred Hampton, regarding the disadvantaged and welcomed voters from a broad spectrum of races and creeds. The goals of the campaign were to demand social programs, voting rights, and affirmative action for all groups that had been neglected by Reaganomics.

Jackson's campaign blamed President Ronald Reagan's policies for reduction of government domestic spending, causing new unemployment and encouraging economic investment outside of the inner cities, while they discouraged the rebuilding of urban industry. The industrial layoffs caused by these policies hit the Black and other minority populations particularly hard.

At the 1984 Democratic National Convention on July 18, 1984, in San Francisco, California, Jackson delivered an address entitled "The Rainbow Coalition". The speech called for Arab Americans, Native Americans, Asian Americans, youth, disabled veterans, small farmers, lesbians and gays to join with African Americans and Jewish Americans for political purpose. Whereas the purpose of PUSH had been to fight for economic and educational opportunities, the Rainbow Coalition was created to address political empowerment and public policy issues.

After his unsuccessful bid for the Democratic nomination in 1984, Jackson attempted to build a broad base of support among groups that "were hurt by Reagan administration policies"—racial minorities, the poor, small farmers, working mothers, the unemployed, some labor union members, gays, and lesbians. The National Rainbow Coalition's first convention took place on April 17 to 19, 1986, in Washington, D.C.

== 1990s onward ==
Jackson moved from Chicago to Washington, D.C. to serve as shadow senator from 1991 to 1996. When he returned to Chicago in 1996 he merged his organizations. The merged entity advocates for African Americans, Hispanics, Native Americans, other minorities, and women. Its main economic goal is to have more minorities on the payrolls, in the boardrooms, and on the supplier lists of major corporations. The industries it most aggressively pursues are the financial sector on Wall Street, the telecommunications field and high-tech firms in Silicon Valley.

The Wall Street activities are organized under sub-organization "The Wall Street Project". The organization has been active in pursuit of increase minority representation in other industries, most notably the broadcast media, the entertainment industry, and the automobile industry. It has also sought increased representation by minority administrators in college and professional sports under the leadership of Jesse Jackson, Jr. For Hispanic issues the merged entity works closely with the League of United Latin American Citizens and the National Council of La Raza.

In 1997, the organization's "Wall Street Project" set up office space at the Trump Building at 40 Wall Street in Manhattan. Donald Trump spoke at a press conference Rainbow/PUSH held on January 14, 1998.

In 1998 the organization attacked Freddie Mac for its lending and employment practices, which led to its pledge to earmark $1 billion in mortgage loans specifically for minorities, to donate more than $1 million directly to Rainbow/PUSH and to become a sponsor of Jackson's annual Wall Street Project. In 2000, the organization investigated the case of Raynard Johnson, who was found hanged by a belt from a tree in front of his home in Kokomo, Mississippi. Jackson called it a "lynching", although two autopsies concluded that the death was a suicide.

In the early 2000s, Rainbow/PUSH worked with NASCAR to increase the number of minorities involved in auto racing, through direct financial support and projects to find talented African-American racing drivers. This initiative ended in 2003, after conservative groups criticized the racing sanctioning body for the partnership. Among the smaller campaigns it has undertaken are the HIV/AIDS Initiative for funding for AIDS programs; the National Field Department support of "constructive agitation to bring about societal change"; and the Prison Outpost project, whose ultimate goal is "to eliminate the need for prisons".

Through his organization and its predecessors Jackson has advocated universal health care, a war on drugs, direct peace negotiations between Palestinians and Israelis, ending apartheid in South Africa, and advancing democracy in Haiti.

Former congressman Mel Reynolds, who served a prison sentence for sexual assault and bank fraud, was hired by Rainbow/PUSH as its resident scholar on prison reform after his release in 2001. The organization is a member of several antiwar coalitions, including Win Without War, United for Peace and Justice, and After Downing Street.

In the aftermath of Hurricane Dorian, Jackson promised to raise money and collect donations for those affected. The organization set up drop-off locations in Chicago to assist with relief efforts.

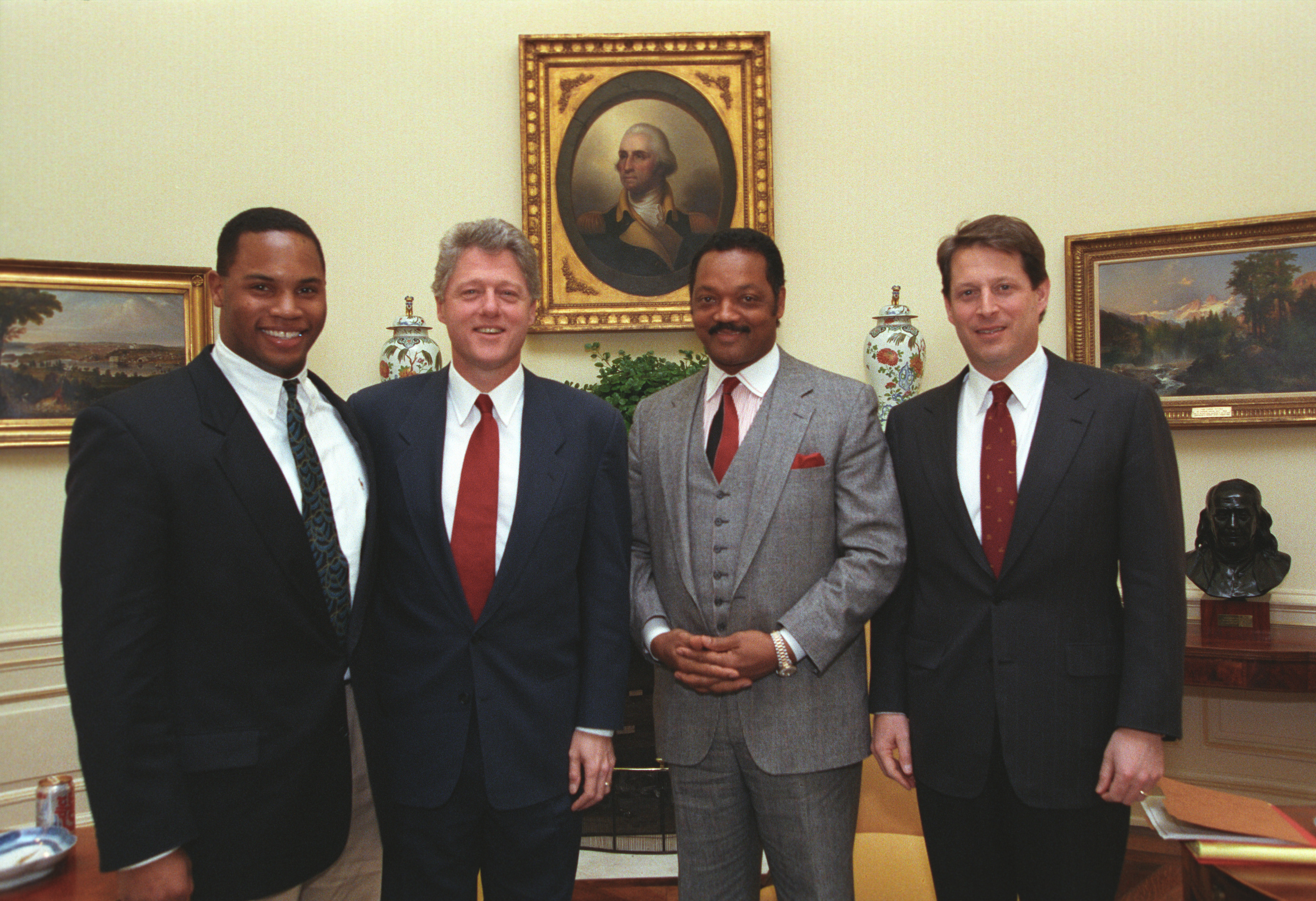
Yusef Jackson, left, serves as president and CEO of Rainbow Push

On July 16, 2023, Jackson, who was diagnosed with Parkinson's disease in 2017 and was now using a wheelchair, stepped down as head of Rainbow/PUSH after leading the organization for more than five decades. He was succeeded by Dallas minister Frederick Haynes III. In April 2024, Haynes resigned from Rainbow/PUSH after leading the organization for less than a year. Yusef Jackson took over leadership of the organization.

After Jesse Jackson died in February 2026, he lay in state at Rainbow/PUSH's Chicago headquarters from February 26 to 27.

In April 2026, Jackson's son Yusef was named president and CEO.

== Involvement in the Duke Lacrosse team controversy ==
In 2006, Jesse Jackson promised the Rainbow/Push Coalition would pay Crystal Mangum's college tuition. Mangum made false rape allegations against members of Duke University's men's lacrosse team who had hired her as a stripper. The charges were later dropped due to lack of evidence. Jackson said that whatever the outcome of the trial, the tuition offer would still be good.

== See also ==
- The Rainbow Agenda
- Save the Children (film)
