= Whelen =

Whelen may refer to:

- Christopher Whelen (1927–1993), English composer, conductor and playwright
- Frederick Whelen (1867-1955), theatre director
- Townsend Whelen (1877–1961), American Colonel and rifleman
  - .35 Whelen, rifle cartridge
  - .375 Whelen, rifle cartridge
  - .400 Whelen, rifle cartridge
- Whelen Engineering Company, manufactures audio and visual warning equipment, they also sponsor:
  - Whelen Modified, NASCAR Whelen Modified Tour

== Other uses ==
- Camp Whelen, former summer camp in New Jersey; on the property formerly known as Harvey Cedars Hotel and now Harvey Cedars Bible Conference
- Whelen Springs, Arkansas

== See also ==
- Whelan (disambiguation)
- Whalen (disambiguation)
- Whalan (disambiguation)
- Whaling (disambiguation)
- Wheelan
