= Phelan (surname) =

Phelan is an Irish surname, one of the two most common anglicisations (the other being Whelan) of the Irish surname Ó Faoláin (which comes from the Irish for "wolf"). The name is commonly seen in the south-east of Ireland, particularly counties Waterford and Kilkenny. Other anglicised forms include Felan and Faelan.

One anglicized pronunciation is /ˈfiːlən/, but in some parts of Kilkenny there is also use of /ˈfeɪlən/ (as faolán, the Irish original form, is pronounced [ˈfˠeːlˠaːnˠ]) or even /ˈhweɪlən/ (because the name has the same origin as Whelan).

== Origins in Ireland ==
The O'Faelan (O'Harts spelling) clan name is claimed to have descended from Fiacha Suidhe, one of the younger brothers of Conn Ceadcathach or Conn of the Hundred Battles. Fiacha Suidhe is said to have been expelled from Meath and after various wanderings was given permission to settle in lands around Waterford which were called the Desies. This origin story, the Expulsion of the Deisi, is covered by Power which is believed to be a fictitious tale created by prominent families of the Desies to justify their elevation to Gaelic nobility from a former tributary status. According to historian C. Thomas Cairney, the O'Phelans were the chiefly family of the Déisi who were a tribe of the Erainn who were the second wave of Celts to settle in Ireland between about 500 and 100 BC.

=== Early medieval and Viking era ===
Keating speaks of Cellachán Caisil King of Munster plundering the town of Waterford, causing its leader Sitiric to take flight. After which, Cellachán gave his sister Gormfhlaith in marriage to Domhnall O Faolain, king of the Deise.

According to the Annals of the Four Masters, in 995, Donnavan son of Ivar and Domhnall son of Faelan, Lord of the Deisi killed Gillapatrick son of Donnchadh, lord of Osraighe. Donnoavan was killed in revenge for this deed a week later, Domhnall son of Faelan is later recorded as having died but the cause is unknown.

Keating also has Domhnall O Faolain, king of the Deise and Ivar of Waterford invading and plundering Munster. Brian Bóruma then gave battle and defeated them at Fan mic Connrach; they were then chased to Waterford where Domhnall and most of the foreigners (Ostmen) were slain and the town was plundered and burned. It is not clear when this is supposed to have happened or if this is the same Domhnall O Faolain reported in the Annals of the Four Masters as having died in 995.

Mothla Son of Domhnall son of Faelan, Lord of the Deisi-Mumhan was present at the Battle of Clontarf in 1014. This time an O Faelan is fighting alongside Brian against the combined forces of the King of Leinster and the Norse Gaels. The Cogadh Gaedhel Re Gallaibh places Mothla with Magnus King of the Ui Liathain at the head of Brian's second battalion, which is described as very great and strong and formed from the chosen hosts of all Munster. Both the Annals and the Cogadh report Mothla's death at this battle along with Brian, his sons, the King of Leinster, many of the Norse Gael leaders and numerous others.

In, 1031 the annals record the death of Diarmaid, son of Domhnall, son of Faelan, lord of the Deisi, who was killed by Muircheartach, son of Brian, in the battle of Sliabh Cua.

In 1051, Muircheartach, son of Breac, (another noble family of the Deisi) lord of the Deisi, was burned by the Ua Faelains.

In 1059, another O'Breac is killed by the Ua Faelain, on this occasion Maelseachlainn Ua Bric and Tomaltach Ua Maelbhrenainn, lord of Sil-Muireadhaigh, were both smothered in a cave by Maelseachlainn, son of Gillabrighde, son of Faelan.

In 1067, in what appears to be an act of revenge, Maelseachlainn is blinded by the O'Breac having been delivered to them by Toirdhealbhach Ua Briain.

Later in 1168, Ua Faelain, lord of the Deisi-Mumhan along with Diarmaid Finn are recorded as killing a grandson of Conchobhar Ua Briain. This grandson had slain Muircheartach Ua Briain, King of Munster, and royal heir of Ireland. Finn and Ua Faelain are recorded as killing this grandson of Conchobhar Ua Briain as well as his co-conspirators in revenge.

=== Norman period ===
In 1170, O’Phelan Prince of the Desies, provided military assistance to the Ostmen of Waterford in an Irish/Ostmen coalition against the Norman adventurer Raymond FitzGerald who had landed at a sea cliff around 14 miles from Waterford with a small band of troops of around 100 men. The coalition was also joined by a group from Ossary and O’Ryan a chieftain of the Odrone. Together they combined with the Vikings and the men of the Desies and formed three bands in which to confront Raymond.

Raymond is believed to have sallied forth against this force from a fortified position on the cliff but was overwhelmed and fled to his original position. During this retreat forces from the coalition managed to get a foothold in Raymond's camp. A number of cattle which had previously been collected and kept inside the camp then stampeded the entrance where the attackers were gaining access. This incident caused the Irish and Ostmen to fall into confusion and disarray and Raymond, rallying his men, turned the course of battle, falling upon the coalition and turning a potential defeat into victory. 500 of the coalition are said to have been killed, some being thrown from the cliffs.

Melaghlin O’Phelan, Prince of the Desies, was amongst the defenders of Waterford during Strongbow's (Richard de Clare) taking of the town in the summer of 1170. On 23 August 1170, Strongbow with 200 knights and around 1000 other men landed in Waterford where he was joined by Raymond. Strongbow and Raymond assaulted Waterford and took the town after a breach was made in the walls. Many citizens are said to have been killed, two Norse leaders of the town, both called Sitric, were executed. A third Norse leader together with Melaghlin O’Phelan were spared due to the intervention of Diarmaid Mac Murchadha King of Leinster.

Melaghlin O’Phelan of the Desies is later found submitting to King Henry II in 1171 during King Henry's expedition to Ireland.

In 1196, the Annals of the Four Masters record the death of a son O'Faelain (Phelan), of the Desies who was part of a failed expedition into Ulster. It appears that this son of O'Faelain was part of a coalition including Rory Mac Donslevy, the English, and chieftains of Connaught. They marched their army against the Kinel-Owen and Oriors. The Kinel-Owen and the men of Orior gave them battle on a plain in Armagh where Mac Donslevy was defeated with dreadful slaughter with twelve of the sons of the lords and chieftains of Connaught slain, along with many of an inferior grade, including the son of O'Faelain of the Desies.

In 1205 the annals record the death of Donnell O'Faelain (Phelan), Lord of the Desies.

In 1208 the same annals record the death of David Breathnach (Walsh) the Bishop of Waterford who was slain by O'Faelan of the Desies.

== Notable persons with the surname ==
- Adam Phelan (born 1991), Australian racing cyclist
- Ann Phelan, Irish Labour Party politician
- Anna Augusta Von Helmholtz-Phelan (1880–1964), American professor, author
- Anne Phelan (1944–2019), Australian actress
- Art Phelan (1887–1964), American baseball player
- Chris Phelan (1955–2026), Irish-born Australian rugby league footballer
- Chris Phelan (economist) (born 1963), American economist
- Dade Phelan (born 1975), American politician from Texas
- Dan Phelan (1861–1934) American baseball player
- Diarmuid Rossa Phelan, Irish academic
- Dick Phelan (1854–1931) American baseball player
- Edward Phelan (1811–1850), American settler
- Edward J. Phelan (1888–1967), Irish Director-General of the United Nations International Labor Office
- Ellen Phelan (born 1943), American artist
- Gerard Phelan (contemporary), American politician college football player
- Jacquie Phelan (contemporary), American mountain biker
- James Phelan (disambiguation), several people
- Jo Phelan, American sociologist
- John J. Phelan (1851–1936), American politician from Connecticut
- John J. Phelan (1872–1946), American boxing commissioner and military officer
- John Paul Phelan (born 1978), Irish politician
- John Phelan (businessman) (born 1964), American businessman serving as United States Secretary of the Navy
- Kate Phelan (born 1964), British fashion journalist and stylist
- Katelynn Phelan (born 2000), Irish boxer
- Kevin Phelan (born 1990), Irish golfer
- Kieran Phelan (1949–2010), Irish politician
- L.A.M. Phelan, (fl. 1910–1955), American businessman and inventor, founded Broaster company
- Lizzie Phelan (born Elizabeth Cocker, 1986), British journalist
- Margaret Phelan (1902–2000), Irish archaeologist
- Mike Phelan (born 1962), English footballer
- Nancy Phelan (1913–2008), Australian writer
- Paddy Phelan (1910–1971), Irish hurler
- Patricia Phelan (contemporary), American Zen priestess
- Patrick Phelan (disambiguation), several people
- Paul Phelan (born 1966), Irish hurler
- Richard Phelan (bishop) (1825–1904), American Catholic bishop
- Ryan Phelan (born 1975), Australian television presenter
- Santiago Phelan (born 1974), Argentine rugby player and coach
- Scott Phelan (born 1988), English football player
- Shaun Phelan (born 1992), New Zealand jumps jockey
- Shawn Phelan (1975–1998), American actor
- Simon Phelan (born 1986), Irish-Jèrriais high jumper
- Siobhán Phelan (contemporary), Irish judge and lawyer
- Ted Phelan (1874–1961), New Zealand trade unionist, politician and rugby administrator
- Terry Phelan (born 1967), Irish football player
- Twist Phelan, American author and attorney
- Unity Phelan, American ballet dancer
- Vicky Phelan (1974–2022), Irish healthcare campaigner
- William Phelan (disambiguation), several people

== Fictional characters ==
- Andrea Phelan, correctional officer on the HBO television show Oz
- Daniel Phelan, judge on the HBO television show The Wire
- Eugenia "Skeeter" Phelan, one of the main characters in The Help by Kathryn Stockett
- Francis Phelan, character in many of William Kennedy's Albany novels
- Phelan, leader of the black market in a Season 2 episode of the re-imagined Battlestar Galactica
- Sally Phelan, a minor character from the Doctor Who episode The Age of Steel
- Sam Phelan, crooked cop from the first season of the television series Smallville
- Pat Phelan, a main character from Coronation Street
- Phelan of the Cantii, character from the tv show Britannia (TV series)

== See also ==
- Irish clans
