= Dan Rostenkowski =

American politician (1928–2010)

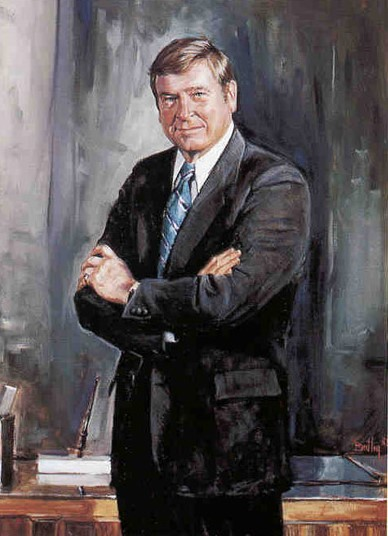
- Official chairmanship portrait, 1983

Member of the U.S. House of Representatives from Illinois
- In office January 3, 1959 – January 3, 1995
- Preceded by: Thomas S. Gordon
- Succeeded by: Michael Flanagan
- Constituency: 8th district (1959–1993); 5th district (1993–1995)
House positions
Chair of the House Ways and Means Committee
In office January 3, 1981 – May 15, 1994
Preceded by	Al Ullman
Succeeded by	Sam Gibbons
House Democratic Chief Deputy Whip
In office January 3, 1977 – January 3, 1981
Leader	Tip O'Neill
Preceded by	John Brademas
Succeeded by	Bill Alexander
Chair of the House Democratic Caucus
In office January 3, 1967 – January 3, 1971
Leader	John William McCormack
Preceded by	Eugene Keogh
Succeeded by	Olin Teague

Member of the Illinois Senate
- In office January 12, 1955 – January 3, 1959
- Preceded by: Stanley J. Mondala
- Succeeded by: Thad L. Kusibab
- Constituency: 33rd district (1957–1959); 27th district (1955–1947)

Member of the Illinois House of Representatives from the 27th district
- In office January 14, 1953 – January 12, 1955 Serving with John Touhy, Anthony C. Prusinski
- Preceded by: John Kuklinski
- Succeeded by: Edward J. Shaw; Louis Janczak

Personal details
- Born: Daniel David Rostenkowski; January 2, 1928 Chicago, Illinois, U.S.
- Died: August 11, 2010 (aged 82) Powers Lake, Wisconsin, U.S.
- Party: Democratic
- Spouse: LaVerne Pirkins (m. 1951)
- Education: Loyola University, Chicago

Military service
- Branch/service: United States Army
- Years of service: 1946–1948
- Rank: Private
- Dan Rostenkowski's voice Rostenkowski explains his opposition to revoking China's Most Favored Nation status Recorded July 21, 1993

Daniel David Rostenkowski (January 2, 1928 – August 11, 2010) was an American politician and convicted felon, most known for his 36-year tenure as a U.S. representative from Illinois, from 1959 to 1995. He became one of the most powerful legislators in Congress, especially in matters of taxation. He was imprisoned in 1996. A Democrat and son of a Chicago alderman, Rostenkowski was for many years Democratic Committeeman of Chicago's 32nd Ward, retaining this position while also serving in Congress.

In national politics, he rose by virtue of seniority to the rank of Chairman of the House Ways and Means Committee in 1981, a role he held until 1994. As Chairman of the Ways and Means Committee, he played a critical role in formulating tax policy during the Republican administration of Ronald Reagan, including the Economic Recovery Tax Act of 1981, which cut the top federal bracket to 50%, and the Tax Reform Act of 1986, which further lowered it to 28% and reduced the number of brackets to only two. He was also involved in trade policy, as well as reforms of the welfare system, health care, and Social Security programs.

Rostenkowski closed legislative deals between the toughest power brokers in the U.S., from union chiefs to corporate titans to president Reagan and to everyone in between. The book Chicago and the American Century credits Rostenkowski with securing billions of dollars in federal money for projects in Chicago and Illinois. The book named him the sixth most significant politician to come from Chicago in the entire twentieth century.

Rostenkowski's political career, however, ended abruptly in 1994 when he was indicted on corruption charges relating to his role in the Congressional Post Office Scandal, and then narrowly defeated for reelection by Republican Michael Flanagan. He subsequently pleaded guilty to charges of mail fraud in 1996 and was fined and sentenced to 17 months in prison. In December 2000, President Bill Clinton pardoned Rostenkowski, who had already served out his sentence.

== Early life and political beginnings ==
Rostenkowski was born on January 2, 1928, into a political family in Chicago to Joseph P. and Priscilla (Dombrowski) Rostenkowski. His grandfather Piotr had immigrated from the region of Tuchola, Poland. His father, Joe, locally known as "Big Joe Rusty", served as alderman and committeeman of the predominantly Polish 32nd Ward in what was then known as "Polish Downtown" for 24 years. As a child, Dan and his two sisters, Marcie and Gladys, often saw their family home double as a meeting place for precinct captains who, like Walter Kmiec from his father's ward organization, would later assist him in bringing in the vote in 1960 for John Kennedy.

The Rostenkowski home was on the second floor of 1349 North Noble Street in Chicago, above the tavern owned by Priscilla and adjacent to the alderman's insurance agency and the headquarters of the regular Democratic 32nd ward organization. Near dawn on August 6, 1938, Joe heard shots. Two top precinct captains for the alderman were shot multiple times as they slept in a car parked in front of the Rostenkowski home. Joe took his family to the Rostenkowski summer home in Genoa City, Wisconsin. The killers were never caught.

In 1941, at the age of 13, Rostenkowski accompanied his father to Washington to witness the inauguration of President Franklin D. Roosevelt for his third term. In 1955 his father lost his aldermanic seat after supporting then-County Clerk Richard J. Daley for Mayor over a fellow Polish leader named Ben Adamowski.

Following his graduation from St. Stanislaus Kostka grammar school, Rostenkowski attended St. John's Military Academy in Delafield, Wisconsin, where he earned letters in baseball, football, basketball and track. After graduating from St. John's in 1946, he enlisted in the United States Army and served for two years as a private with the Seventh Infantry Division in Korea. In 1949 he tried out for the Philadelphia Athletics, but his father convinced him to give up his dream and come home, as his mother was losing a battle with cancer. After her death, he enrolled at Loyola University in Chicago.

== Illinois General Assembly ==
In 1952, while still a student at Loyola, the twenty-four-year-old Rostenkowski was elected as one of three legislators from the 27th district to the Illinois House of Representatives. He was its youngest member. As a state lawmaker, Rostenkowski worked on the planning and financing of a major federal highway from downtown Chicago to the new O'Hare International Airport. Like Daley and many other Chicago politicians before him, serving in Springfield was often viewed as a first step to a higher office in Chicago. The perception of the state legislature as training ground went hand in hand with another idea, that Chicago, not Springfield or Washington constituted the most desirable locus of political life. After two years in the House, he was elected to the Illinois Senate in 1954. In 1957 he pushed a bill to extend state funded free polio vaccines to children as well as a bill that would have provided bonuses of up to $555 for Korean War veterans – financed by a one-cent cigarette tax. It passed, but was later rejected by Illinois voters in a 1958 referendum. While serving his second term in the Senate, Chicago Mayor Richard J. Daley suggested that he run for Clerk of the Circuit Court of Cook County, instead, Rostenkowski pushed for and received Daley's support to run for the United States Congress.

== Connecting with the Kennedys ==
As a young and outgoing urban Democrat, new to Washington, Rostenkowski quickly found mentors and made friends with other Democrats. His relationship with Massachusetts Reps. Edward Boland and Torbert Macdonald as well as John F. Kennedy aides Larry O'Brien and Kenny O'Donnell led to his involvement in JFK's run for the White House. In 1960 at the request of the Kennedy campaign he gave speeches in southern states for Kennedy. Chicago voters turned out in a large majority for Kennedy.

On September 26, 1960, Rostenkowski witnessed what many consider the turning point in Kennedy's battle with Richard Nixon. Kennedy invited Rostenkowski to the CBS studios in downtown Chicago to view in person the first ever televised Presidential debate. Unaware of the two candidates' stark differences on camera, Rostenkowski later said "I was under the impression that Kennedy lost the debate."

In the aftermath of Kennedy's assassination Rostenkowski was one of a small group who made regular visits to Jacqueline Kennedy's home in Georgetown. "On a regular basis Kenny O'Donnell would get three or four of us from Capitol Hill, who worked with Jack Kennedy, together at Jackie's house. We would sit around Jackie's living room with Bobby Kennedy, eat sandwiches, have some drinks and tell war stories. Jackie would laugh so hard her side would hurt sometimes.

== Early years, U.S. Congress ==
In his first decade in Congress, Rostenkowski gradually attained a position of influence in the House. In his freshman term he secured a position on the Interstate and Foreign Commerce Committee. After the death of Illinois congressional delegation leader Thomas J. O'Brien in 1964, Rostenkowski inherited O'Brien's seat on the Ways and Means Committee. In 1966 and again in 1968, he was elected chairman of the House Democratic Caucus. "His rough edges, Chicago syntax, and intimidating bulk made him a stereotype of Chicago machine Democrats who the Washington media enjoyed portraying as mere stooges of mayor Richard J. Daley".

During his early years in congress, Rostenkowski's record was typical of a northern Democrat with close ties to a powerful big city political organization. He made sure that Chicago received its full share of funds under programs like the Law Enforcement Assistance Act. And in the face of white backlash from his district, he supported civil rights legislation and the various social welfare programs that made up President Lyndon B. Johnson's War on Poverty. He also argued in favor of federal funding of inner-city renewal projects and urban mass transit networks. By 1967, Daley often looked to Rostenkowski as Chicago's chief liaison in Washington, and counted on him to deliver federal funds.

Rostenkowski supported the American effort in Vietnam until 1971, when he joined anti-war Congressmen in an attempt to force a quick withdrawal of American troops by voting against certain military appropriation bills.

A great admirer of Lyndon Johnson, he was tapped by the President to second the nomination of Hubert Humphrey as his vice president at the 1964 Democratic National Convention in Atlantic City. Four years later, at the 1968 Democratic National Convention in Chicago, Johnson would again ask Rostenkowski to take the podium, but this time the results proved costly to the young congressman's future in Washington.

== 1968 Democratic National Convention ==
Met by anti-war protesters, racial unrest, and rioting on the streets, the 1968 Democratic National Convention, held at the International Amphitheatre, proved an international embarrassment for the city. House Majority Leader Carl Albert, the convention chairman, and Rostenkowski's boss, was unable to control the rowdy behavior of the delegates inside the hall. Rostenkowski happened to be manning the phones on the podium when a furious Lyndon Johnson called from his Texas ranch and ordered him to take over the gavel to quiet the proceedings on the convention floor. Rostenkowski did, and an embarrassed Albert never forgave him.

Two years later, Rostenkowski was running for a third term as chairman of the Democratic Caucus and did not expect any opposition. But to his surprise, the Texas delegation nominated their colleague, Olin Teague, a popular war hero and Chairman of the Veterans' Affairs Committee. Even though Teague announced that he was not a candidate, they elected him anyway, 155 to 91. "I got defeated by Tiger Teague, who voted for me", exclaimed Rostenkowski. "I saw him vote for me." The liberal Democrats voted against Rostenkowski because of his ties to Mayor Daley, who was a pariah because of the 1968 convention and many of Albert's friends voted against him because of the feud.

== Political payback ==
A few weeks later, Albert was elected Speaker of the House, while Hale Boggs replaced him as majority leader. Boggs asked the new speaker three times to name Rostenkowski assistant majority leader and three times Albert refused.

Albert instead picked Rostenkowski's close friend, Tip O'Neill, to become whip. This allowed O'Neill to leap over Rostenkowski on the leadership ladder, a ladder that led to O'Neill becoming speaker just six years later. "The events of that January shadowed the relationship between O'Neill and Rostenkowski from that point on" said former Representative James Shannon, "Every step of the way, Danny Rostenkowski looked at Tip O'Neill and, while he loved the guy felt, 'Man, that is where I should be'."

== Political comeback ==
In the early 1970s with his hopes of a leadership position lost, President Johnson out of office and Daley out of favor with the Republican administration, Rostenkowski began to rebuild his career. Though he rarely spoke on the floor, he was offering legislation on his own, such as anti-pollution bills, subsidies to local museums, and a proposal to grant renters the same tax breaks as homeowners.

In 1974, Ways and Means chairman Al Ullman named Rostenkowski chairman of the committee's newly created subcommittee on health. In this role Rostenkowski obtained expertise in two critical areas of policy that would serve him well in his future: health care and taxes.

Late in 1976, Richard Daley died, leading to speculation that Rostenkowski would return home to Chicago and run for mayor. That same year, speaker Carl Albert announced he would not seek another term in Congress. Meaning Tip O'Neill would become speaker, this paved the way for Rostenkowski to begin the climb back up the leadership ladder.

He played a key role in the election of Jim Wright as the House Majority Leader. In return, O'Neill and Wright appointed Rostenkowski chief deputy to the new Democratic whip, John Brademas. The 1980 election was a disaster for the Democratic Party, but it opened up new opportunities for advancement to Rostenkowski.

Rostenkowski easily defeated future Congressman Luis Gutiérrez's bid to replace him as 32nd Ward Democratic Committeeman in the 1984 Chicago Democratic primary.

In 1986, Rostenkowski was charged with drunk driving in Wisconsin and was charged $555.00 and had his license suspended in Illinois for one year.

=== Chairman Rostenkowski ===
In 1980 the defeats of Chairman Al Ullman and Majority Whip John Brademas presented Rostenkowski, the highest-ranking member of Ways and Means, with a choice: he could chair that committee or succeed Brademas as Majority Whip. Since the position of Majority Whip is usually a stepping-stone to the majority leadership and, ultimately, to the House speakership, Rostenkowski was tempted to take it. However, his skill and vast experience on the tax writing Ways and Means Committee won out. In January 1981, Rostenkowski was elected committee chairman. As chairman, his job was to satisfy the demands within the House and with the President, so that he could enact legislation. Rostenkowski received criticism during his early years as chairman, with the media speculating that he was, "in over his head" leading the complex tax writing committee. He lost his first few legislative battles with new President Ronald Reagan in 1981, but, in 1983, he successfully piloted a complex overhaul of the Social Security System.

By 1984, Chairman Rostenkowski began to hit his stride. He was praised for his role in drafting the 1984 Deficit Reduction Act, a three-year, $50 billion tax hike. During his 13 years as chairman, Rostenkowski grew to become larger than life, especially to Ways and Means colleagues. "He ran the committee the old-fashioned way, with loyalty, trust, and his word" said former congressman Mike Andrews of Texas. He was a consensus builder who commanded through his political judgment and his ability to make a deal. Not as much of an expert on the tax code as was a previous chairman Wilbur Mills, or one to lead with a light hand, such as Ullman, Rostenkowski built a staff of dedicated experts who were given broad leeway to shape legislation, leaving for himself the political judgments, and actions that were required to pass the proposals. "Is it good law"? was his directive to his aides. "I want people to be able to say, that son of a gun, he had some guts, he had some fortitude, he realized what you had to be in order to be a national legislator."

A profile of Rostenkowski in the July 1989 issue of National Journal said "The chairman is a man of action, not words; a doer, not a rhetorician; one who thrives at the negotiating table, not the speaker's lectern....he has nourished an image as a legislative strategist that is perhaps unsurpassed on Capitol Hill. He wants to make laws, and as a lobbyist put it, 'he doesn't like people throwing a lot of dust in the gears'."

=== "Write Rosty" ===
On May 28, 1985, he rose to national prominence when he delivered the televised Democratic response to an Oval Office address by President Reagan calling for tax reform. In his eleven-minute address, Rostenkowski referred to his working class Polish neighborhood saying many neighbors have moved to the suburbs. "They make more money than their parents. In most cases their lives have changed for the better. But the tax system has changed for the worse, and so has their faith in it." "Why should a bank teller pay a higher tax rate than the bank? Why should a gas station attendant pay a greater share than the oil company he works for? "Trying to tax people and businesses, everyone, fairly", he told the nation. "That's been the historic Democratic commitment." He called for a tax system that was "simple and fair and also gives real relief for middle income tax payers." Rostenkowski concluded the speech with an appeal to the "silent majority" He asked viewers fed up with the current tax system to write him a letter to show their support, "Even if you can't spell Rostenkowski, put down what they used to call my father and grandfather: Rosty", he said into the camera. "Just address it to R-O-S-T-Y, Washington, D.C." Within days his appeal had generated over 75,000 letters making the obscure congressman something of a folk hero. The May 30 issue of The Washington Post asked "Has a Star been Born?" "Excellent" said the president's political director, Ed Rollins. "He is the only guy who has not paled beside the president in a Democratic response." Chris Matthews, then press secretary to House Speaker O'Neill said "He spoke right to the Knights of Columbus guy who voted for Reagan last time and might do it again, and he told him he's watching out for his interests." "He is deeply committed to the proposition that the tax code must be revised to allow working Americans to keep more of their salaries."

== Major legislation enacted during chairmanship ==
Under Rostenkowski's leadership, the Ways and Means committee passed several major pieces of legislation, including:

- Economic Recovery Tax Act of 1981 (Pub. L. 97–34)
- Tax Equity and Fiscal Responsibility Act of 1982 (Pub. L. 97–248)
- Social Security Amendments of 1983 (Pub. L. 98–21)
- Interest and Dividends Tax Compliance Act of 1983 (Pub. L. 98–67)
- Deficit Reduction Act of 1984 (Pub. L. 98–369)
- Consolidated Omnibus Budget Reconciliation Act of 1985 (Pub. L. 99–272)
- Superfund Amendments and Reauthorization Act of 1986 (Pub. L. 99–499)
- Tax Reform Act of 1986 (Pub. L. 99–514)
- Omnibus Budget Reconciliation Act of 1987 (Pub. L. 100–203)
- Medicare Catastrophic Coverage Act of 1988 (Pub. L. 100–360)
- Omnibus Budget Reconciliation Act of 1989 (Pub. L. 101–239)
- Omnibus Budget Reconciliation Act of 1990 (Pub. L. 101–508)
- Omnibus Budget Reconciliation Act of 1993 (Pub. L. 103–66)

== Felony conviction ==
Rostenkowski's political career ended in 1994 after a two-year investigation by the Justice Department. In a case led by future U.S. Attorney General Eric Holder, Rostenkowski was indicted on corruption charges for his role in the House Post Office scandal. He was forced to step down from all Congressional leadership positions. In elections later that year, after winning the Democratic primary, Rostenkowski lost his seat in a narrow election and retired from political life.

Charges against Rostenkowski included: keeping "ghost" employees on his payroll (paying salaries at taxpayer expense for no-show "jobs"); using Congressional funds to buy gifts such as chairs and ashtrays for friends; diverting taxpayer funds to pay for vehicles used for personal transportation; tampering with a Grand Jury witness; and trading in officially purchased stamps for cash at the House Post Office.

While the stamps-for-cash allegation received the most media coverage, those charges were dismissed on the recommendation of the prosecutor. In 1996, he pleaded guilty to reduced charges of mail fraud. He was fined and sentenced to 17 months in prison, of which he served 15 at the Oxford Federal Correctional Institution in Wisconsin, and the remaining two months at a halfway house in Chicago. Rostenkowski was pardoned in December 2000 by President Bill Clinton, who said, "Rostenkowski had done a lot for his country and had more than paid for his mistakes."

== Changing times ==
Rostenkowski acknowledged breaking House rules regarding stationery-store purchases and employing individuals who did little or no work – practices that his supporters argued were common on the Hill. "He took the hit for the whole House for practices that were there since time immemorial", said Republican Congressman Bill Frenzel of Minnesota. Democratic Congressman Anthony Beilenson of California said "I can't believe he's venal or corrupt. He was inattentive and continued the old ways."

Former President Gerald Ford, whose lone pardon letter in all his post-White House years was on behalf of Rostenkowski, told a biographer, "Danny's problem was he played precisely under the rules of the city of Chicago. Now, those aren't the same rules that any other place in the country lives by, but in Chicago they were totally legal, and Danny got a screwing".

In his commentary titled: "The Rules Kept Changing; Dan Rostenkowski Didn't", Pulitzer Prize-winning columnist Mike Royko, a frequent Rostenkowski critic, wrote "Nobody should be taking pleasure from Rostenkowski's misfortune. Not unless you have never, ever, broken even a minor law and gotten away with it, fudged a bit on your taxes or violated any of the Ten Commandments.' "Only a few decades ago, none of this would have been happening. That's because the rules changed. Most of the things he was nailed for would have been legal and common or, at worst, nickel-dime offenses when he began his career in Congress." Royko also questioned the motives of federal prosecutors, "Rostenkowski was a big political fish-the kind of trophy that an ambitious federal prosecutor loves to stuff and hang on his wall…That's what did Rostenkowski in – a federal prosecutor's personal ambitions."

In a 1998 interview with John F. Kennedy Jr. for George Magazine, Rostenkowski estimated the government spent over $20 million on his case. "Not many people in this country can counter resources like that, and I'm not one of them... I couldn't finance the fight any longer."

In the end, Rostenkowski once lamented to a friend, "I'm going to jail for sending a guy a rocking chair."

External videos
- Booknotes interview with Richard E. Cohen on Rostenkowski: The Pursuit of Power and the End of the Old Politics, September 19, 1999, C-SPAN

Rostenkowski's downfall in 1994 was portrayed by Republicans as emblematic of Democratic corruption. The scandal helped fuel the Republican victory in the House, led by Newt Gingrich and his Contract with America. "The rise and fall of Dan Rostenkowski tracks the rise and fall of Democrats in the House", concludes Richard E. Cohen in his book on Rostenkowski. "It is a story of power, accomplishments, and, ultimately, failure and humiliation." Rostenkowski was defeated by Republican attorney Michael Patrick Flanagan by a margin of eight points. Flanagan would be defeated two years later by Democrat Rod Blagojevich. Similar to Rostenkowski, Blagojevich was sentenced to 14-years in prison following 2012 federal convictions for corruption.

== In Chicago ==
Throughout his career in Washington, Rostenkowski returned to Chicago almost every weekend. In his early days he would drive to and from Washington with two other young Illinois Congressmen, Republicans Harold Collier and future Republican leader Robert Michel. Upon his return every Friday, Rostenkowski met with Mayor Richard J. Daley at his City Hall office to discuss Chicago's agenda in Washington. Besides Daley, Rostenkowski worked with five other Chicago Mayors, Michael Bilandic, Jane Byrne, Harold Washington, Eugene Sawyer and Richard M. Daley. During the 1980s "Council Wars" pitted the mostly white City Council against Mayor Washington, Chicago's first Black mayor. The city was dubbed "Beirut on the Lake" by The Wall Street Journal. During this turbulent period Rostenkowski was a tower of stability. "He made sure the city got its fair share, no matter who was mayor", said Bill Daley "Danny felt he had to help the pathetic armatures in the Mayor's office because he had a love for the city. "He did more for the city than anybody else", said Alderman Edward M. Burke, chairman of the City Council's finance committee. "But he never asked for credit. He just went to the mayor. That's the way it's done in Chicago." Local political scientist Paul Green said, "During a decade of chaos, he became an insurance policy for the city".

Rostenkowski gave up his position as Democratic Committeeman of the 32nd Ward in 1984, but retained local influence as he was able to essentially hand the position to his protégé, Alderman Terry Gabinski.

An unabashed supporter of Chicago interests, Rostenkowski paid attention to the needs of Chicago-based institutions –especially when they promised more jobs for Chicago area workers."I make no apology for my efforts to build a stronger Chicago." In the early 1980s Rostenkowski successfully fought off repeated attempts to impose a transaction tax on commodity traders at the Chicago Board of Trade, the Chicago Mercantile Exchange and the Chicago Board of Options Exchange. Such a tax would have been fatal to the exchanges, driving business out of Chicago to overseas markets. Rostenkowski helped secure for the city of Chicago the right to tax passengers flying in and out of its airports. The tax, originally intended to raise money for the construction of a third airport, now yields $90 million annually for improvements at O'Hare and Midway Airport. But its passage was in big trouble before Rostenkowski stepped in to salvage it. According to Ways and Means lore, he threatened to hold up the entire federal budget at one point until he was sure the tax was in place.

Rostenkowski was also considered a longtime leader of Chicago Polonia and was seen to represent its interests in Washington along with fellow Congressman Roman Pucinski.

== For Chicago ==
In his book Naked Economics: Undressing the Dismal Science, author Charles Wheelan wrote "We Chicagoans can drive around the city and literally point to things that Rosty built." Although Rostenkowski never literally "built" anything with his own money or labor, he delivered federal funds for Chicago and the State of Illinois. Some of his notable projects include: securing $32 million for the Blue Line of the Chicago Transit Authority which expanded travel from the Chicago Loop to O'Hare International Airport, $450 million to repave and expand the Kennedy Expressway, $25 million to fix the dangerous S Curve on Lake Shore Drive $4 billion for the Deep Tunnel Project, which was designed to keep raw sewage from entering the Chicago River and Lake Michigan, while also protecting over half a million suburban and city home owners threatened by flooded basements. He followed that with $42.4 million for reservoirs in McCook and Thornton Townships and by O'Hare airport, $16.8 million for downtown's State Street Mall renovation, $3.5 million for the construction of the Cook County Boot Camp, a military-style alternative for first-time youthful offenders. When the Chicago White Sox baseball team was considering moving to Florida, Rostenkowski secured a $150 million bond authority for the construction of US Cellular Field. Once nearly abandoned and left in disrepair, he ensured $75 million in tax-free bonds for the remodeling of Navy Pier, which today has become Chicago's preeminent tourist attraction. To ease erosion that threatened Lake Shore Drive and several harbors and museums along the Chicago lake front, Rostenkowski secured $2.2 million for the Chicago Shoreline Protection Project, and laid the foundation for a coordinated partnership among the Army Corps of Engineers, the federal government and the City of Chicago. He also was responsible for securing funding for the upkeep of Chicago area bridges including the Chicago Skyway, the Division, Cermak, and Roosevelt street bridges.

In January 1983 Plitt Theaters filed a lawsuit to obtain a permit to demolish the historic Chicago Theatre. Mayor Jane Byrne and other civic leaders appealed to Rostenkowski to assist them in obtaining a federal Urban Development Action Grant to save the theater. Grants of this kind were being frozen from Chicago by Samuel Pierce, Secretary of Housing and Urban Development, in reprisal for Rostenkowski's opposition to the Reagan administration's Urban Enterprise Zone bill. Rostenkowski considered these zones a Republican gimmick that would help businesses escape taxes without addressing chronic inner-city unemployment. Rostenkowski called his friend Vice President George H. W. Bush, "If I don't get that grant, you're going to have one very pissed off chairman of the Ways and Means Committee for your administration's pending tax bill". Shortly thereafter, Pierce phoned Rostenkowski to ask if he could come up and see him. Sure, the congressman replied, just bring the papers for the theater project.

In a move that was controversial at the time, Rostenkowski won tax breaks for local developers to build Presidential Towers, a large four-tower apartment complex in the middle of what was then a Skid Row neighborhood. The project spurred development of Chicago's West Loop and led to thousands of young professionals moving to downtown Chicago. The once blighted area grew to attract restaurants and other industries, including Harpo Studios, where The Oprah Winfrey Show was taped.

== Later life ==
=== After Congress ===
Following his political career, he operated Danross Associates, a Chicago-based legislative and government affairs firm. He also worked as a political commentator, as well as a guest lecturer at Northwestern University and a Senior Fellow at Loyola University Chicago. Rostenkowski received a federal pension of between US$97,000 and US$125,000 per year. Congressional pensions are based on years of service and Rostenkowski is one of the few Congressmen to have served 36 years in Congress.

Rostenkowski's papers are now held at the Congressional Archives at Loyola University Chicago.

== Death ==
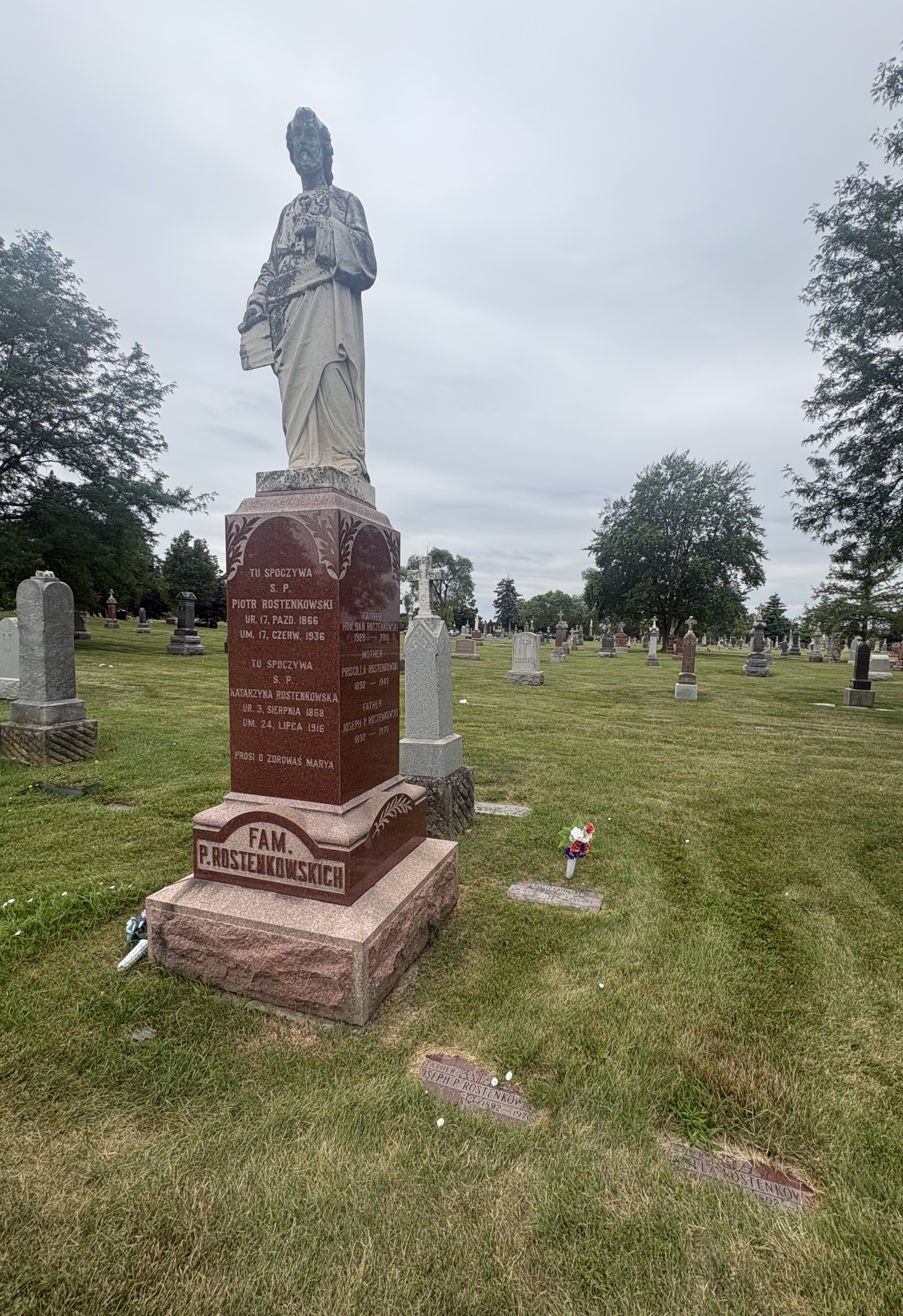
Rostenkowski's grave at St. Adalbert Cemetery

On August 11, 2010, Rostenkowski died at the age of 82 from the effects of lung cancer at his summer home in Powers Lake, Wisconsin.

A funeral was held on August 17, 2010, at the St. Stanislaus Kostka Church in northwest Chicago, with his body being buried in St. Adalbert Catholic Cemetery, at Niles, Illinois.

== See also ==
- List of American federal politicians convicted of crimes
- List of federal political scandals in the United States
- List of people pardoned or granted clemency by the president of the United States
- Charles Rangel

== Notes ==
Illinois House of Representatives
Preceded by John Kuklinski	Member of the Illinois House of Representatives from the 27th district 1953–1955; Served alongside: John Touhy, Anthony C. Prusinski	Succeeded by Edward J. Shaw; Louis Janczak
Illinois Senate
Preceded by Stanley J. Mondala	Member of the Illinois Senate from the 27th district 1955–1957	Succeeded by Robert E. Cherry
Preceded by Morris E. Muhleman	Member of the Illinois Senate from the 33rd district 1957–1959	Succeeded by Thad L. Kusibab
U.S. House of Representatives
Preceded by Thomas S. Gordon	Member of the U.S. House of Representatives from Illinois's 8th congressional district 1959–1993	Succeeded by Phil Crane
Preceded by Bill Lipinski	Member of the U.S. House of Representatives from Illinois's 5th congressional district 1993–1995	Succeeded by Michael Patrick Flanagan
Preceded by Al Ullman	Chair of the House Ways and Means Committee; 1981–1994	Succeeded by Sam Gibbons
Party political offices
Preceded by Eugene Keogh	Chair of the House Democratic Caucus; 1967–1971	Succeeded by Olin Teague
Preceded by John Brademas	House Democratic Chief Deputy Whip; 1977–1981	Succeeded by Bill Alexander
