= Michael Whalen =

Michael Whalen may refer to:

- Mike Whalen (born 1960), American athlete and coach
- Michael Whalen (composer) (born 1965), American composer
- Michael Whalen (actor) (1902–1974), American actor
- Michael Whalen (journalist) (1942–2025), Canadian broadcaster

== See also ==
- Michael Whelan (disambiguation)
- Whalen
