= Whalan (surname) =

Whalan is a surname, an anglicized variant of the Gaelic surname, Ó Faoláin, see page "Phelan" for more. Notable people with this surname include:

- Elka Whalan (born 1981), Australian swimmer
- Paul Whalan
- Thomas Whalan
