= Thomas Geoghegan =

American lawyer

Thomas H. Geoghegan
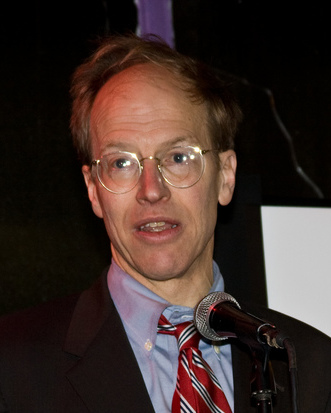
- Geoghegan in 2009
- Born: Tom Geoghegan; January 22, 1949 (age 77); Cincinnati, Ohio, U.S.
- Education: Harvard University, Harvard Law School
- Occupations: Attorney, Author
- Writing career
- Genre: Social sciences
- Website: www.dsgchicago.com

Thomas H. Geoghegan (/ˈɡeɪɡən/ GAY-gən; born January 22, 1949, in Cincinnati, Ohio) is an American labor lawyer and author based in Chicago.

He has represented several unions and union groups, and written six books on labor unions, law, politics and his personal experiences. He has written for The New Republic magazine and contributed to several newspapers, and had commentaries on a number of radio and TV stations. Geoghegan ran in the Democratic primary for the Illinois's 5th congressional district in 2009 and came in a three-way tie for third.

== Life and work ==
In 1967, Geoghegan graduated from St. Xavier High School in Cincinnati. He later graduated from Harvard University and Harvard Law School. Geoghegan has represented the United Mine Workers, Teamsters for a Democratic Union, and currently works at Despres, Schwartz and Geoghegan Ltd.. He has been a staff writer and contributing writer to The New Republic and his work has also appeared in the Chicago Tribune, the Los Angeles Times, the New York Times, Dissent, The American Prospect, The Nation, and Harper's Magazine. His commentary has been featured on National Public Radio, Nightline, The Today Show, CBS Sunday Morning, CNN, CNBC, and PBS's WTTW-11.

Geoghegan was a Democratic candidate for Rahm Emanuel's seat in 2009. The primary for the special election took place on March 3, 2009, and was won by Mike Quigley. The general election was won by Quigley on April 7, 2009.

== Views ==
In his books, articles and commentaries, Geoghegan has urged a number of reforms to increase America's commitment to democracy at home and abroad. Geoghegan supports the National Popular Vote compact for presidential elections on the grounds that it would increase electoral responsiveness, transparency and accountability. He urges a reform of the redistricting of US congressional districts, arguing that currently over 90% of Congressional seats are "safe", such that no challenger has a serious chance of unseating an incumbent and this discourages voter participation. He argues against the filibuster in the US Senate as undemocratic and unconstitutional under current rules. Less than 9% of the population resides in 20 states representing 40% of the seats in the Senate. In regards to America's economy and quality of life, Geoghegan argues that Germany and other northern European countries "do both capitalism and socialism better than we do."

== Personal life ==
Geoghegan is Catholic.

== Works ==
- 1991: Which Side Are You On?: Trying to Be For Labor When It's Flat On Its Back (FSG), ISBN 0-374-28919-0
- 1998: The Secret Lives of Citizens: Pursuing the Promise of American Life (Pantheon Books), ISBN 0-679-42153-X
- 2002: In America's Court: How a Civil Lawyer Who Likes to Settle Stumbled into a Criminal Trial (New Press), ISBN 1-56584-732-6
- 2005: The Law in Shambles (Prickly Paradigm), ISBN 0-9728196-9-X
- 2007: See You in Court: How the Right Made America a Lawsuit Nation (New Press), ISBN 978-1-59558-099-3
- 2010: Were you Born on the Wrong Continent?
- 2011: Boeing's Threat to American Enterprise (WSJ)
- 2014: Only One Thing Can Save Us: Why America Needs a New Kind of Labor Movement (New Press), ISBN 978-1-59558-836-4

2021: 'The History of Democracy Has Yet to be Written' Belt Press, Cleveland, OH ISBN 978-1-953368-00-3

== See also ==
- Illinois's 5th congressional district special election, 2009
- Illinois's 5th congressional district
