= 2018 Illinois Secretary of State election =

- November 6, 2018
- Turnout: 56.44%
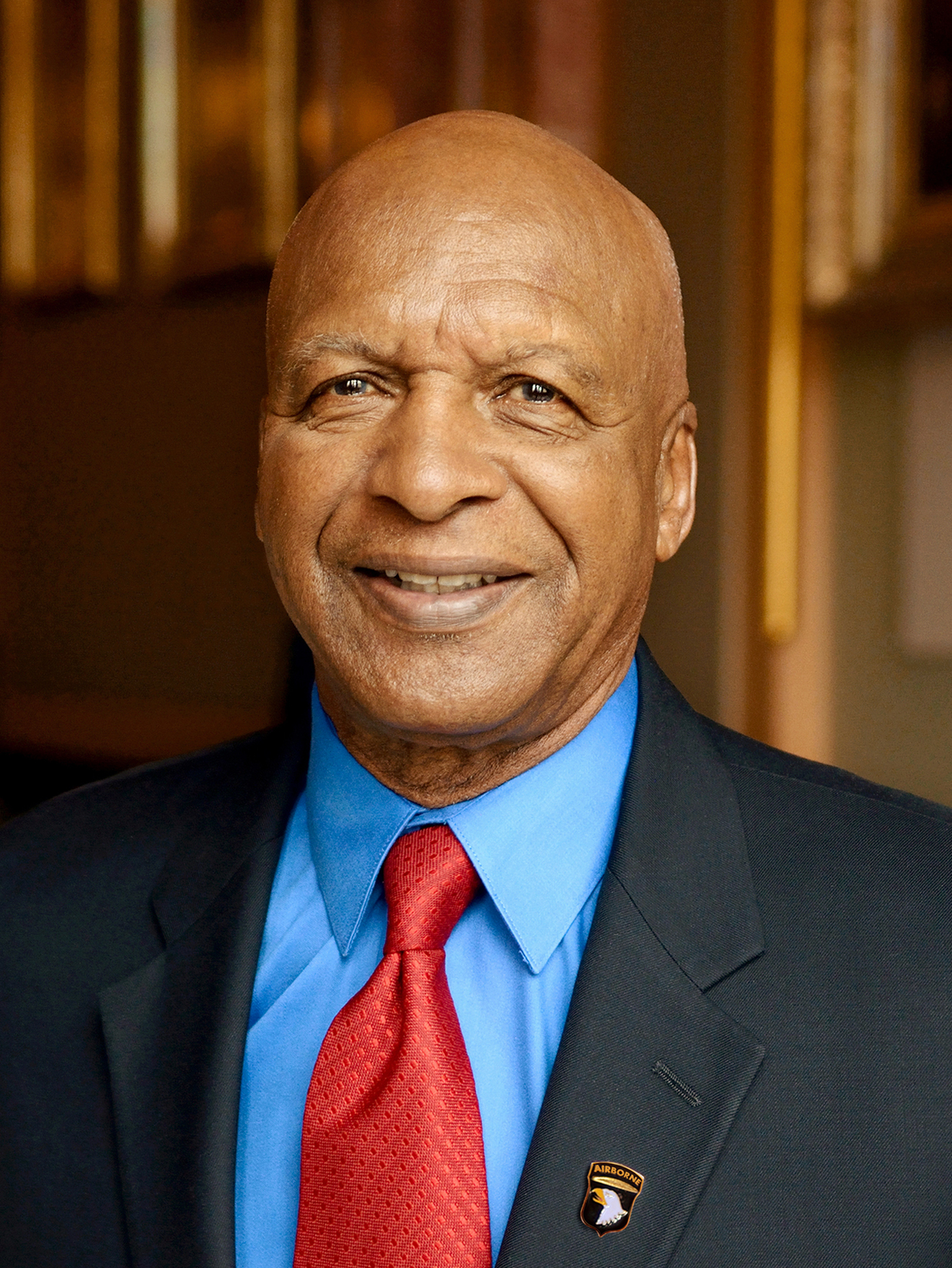

Nominee	Jesse White	Jason Helland
Party	Democratic	Republican
Popular vote	3,120,207	1,336,079
Percentage	68.26%	29.23%
- White: 40–50% 50–60% 60–70% 70–80% 80–90% >90% Helland: 40–50% 50–60% 60–70% 70–80% 80–90% Tie: 40–50% 50–60%
Secretary of State before election
Jesse White
Democratic
Elected Secretary of State
Jesse White
Democratic

The 2018 Illinois Secretary of State election was held on November 6, 2018, to elect the next Illinois Secretary of State. Incumbent Democratic secretary of state Jesse White, who had been in office since 1999, initially announced in August 2015 that he would retire. On August 17, 2017, White reversed this decision and announced that he would run for re-election to a sixth term. Governing magazine projected the race as "safe Democratic".

== Democratic primary ==
=== Candidates ===
==== Nominee ====
- Jesse White, incumbent secretary of state

==== Withdrew ====
- Mike Hastings, state senator

==== Declined ====
- Walter Burnett Jr., alderman for Chicago's 27th ward

=== Results ===
Democratic primary results
Party	Candidate	Votes	%
Democratic	Jesse White (incumbent)	1,209,978	100.0
Total votes		1,209,978	100.0

== Republican primary ==
=== Candidates ===
==== Nominee ====
- Jason Helland, Grundy County State's Attorney

==== Declined ====
- J.C. Griffin, Iraq War veteran

=== Results ===
Republican primary results
Party	Candidate	Votes	%
Republican	Jason Helland	609,190	100.0
Total votes		609,190	100.0

== General election ==
=== Endorsements ===
Steve Dutner (L)

Newspapers

- State Journal Register
Jason Helland (R)

Newspapers

- Daily Herald
Jesse White (D)

Newspapers

- Chicago Sun-Times
- Chicago Tribune

=== Predictions ===
Source	Ranking	As of
Governing	Safe D	October 11, 2018

=== Results ===
2018 Illinois Secretary of State election
Party	Candidate	Votes	%	±%
Democratic	Jesse White (incumbent)	3,120,207	68.26%	+2.56%
Republican	Jason Helland	1,336,079	29.23%	−2.16%
Libertarian	Steve Dutner	114,556	2.51%	−0.38%
Total votes		4,570,842	100.0%	N/A
Democratic hold				

==== By congressional district ====
White won 17 of 18 congressional districts, including four that elected Republicans.

District	White	Helland	Representative
1st	83%	15%	Bobby Rush
2nd	85%	13%	Robin Kelly
3rd	71%	26%	Dan Lipinski
4th	88%	9%	Chuy García
5th	79%	18%	Mike Quigley
6th	63%	35%	Sean Casten
7th	89%	9%	Danny Davis
8th	69%	28%	Raja Krishnamoorthi
9th	78%	19%	Jan Schakowsky
10th	71%	27%	Brad Schneider
11th	70%	27%	Bill Foster
12th	57%	41%	Mike Bost
13th	62%	35%	Rodney Davis
14th	60%	37%	Lauren Underwood
15th	45%	53%	John Shimkus
16th	55%	42%	Adam Kinzinger
17th	62%	36%	Cheri Bustos
18th	53%	45%	Darin LaHood

== See also ==
- 2018 Illinois elections
