= 2009 Illinois's 5th congressional district special election =

- April 7, 2009

Illinois's 5th congressional district
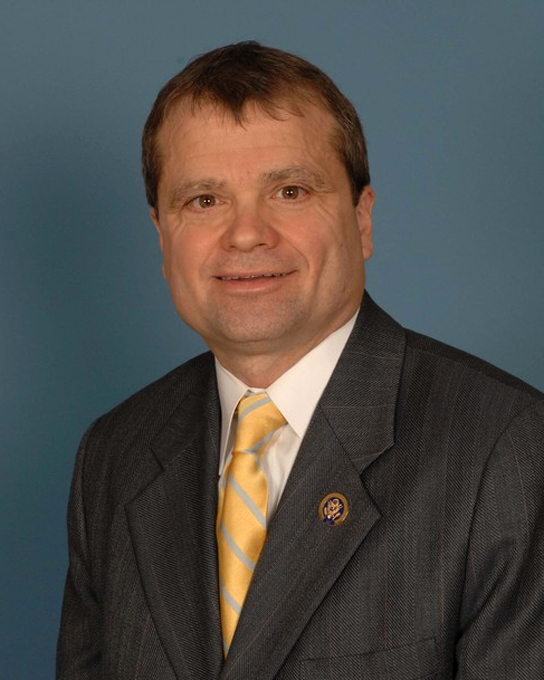

Nominee	Mike Quigley	Rosanna Pulido	Matt Reichel
Party	Democratic	Republican	Green
Popular vote	30,561	10,662	2,911
Percentage	69.2%	24.2%	6.6%
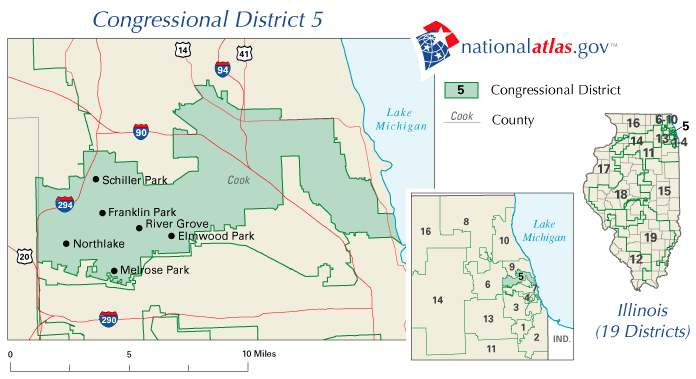
U.S. Representative before election
Rahm Emanuel
Democratic
Elected U.S. Representative
Mike Quigley
Democratic

A special election was held in Illinois's 5th congressional district in 2009 to fill the seat vacated by Rahm Emanuel. On April 7, Democratic nominee Mike Quigley defeated Republican nominee Rosanna Pulido and Green nominee Matt Reichel. Quigley was sworn in on April 21 and served out the congressional term.

Emanuel officially resigned from the House of Representatives, effective January 2, in a letter to his constituents and Illinois Governor Rod Blagojevich and to House Speaker Nancy Pelosi. Emanuel was named White House Chief of Staff by incoming President-elect Barack Obama. Emanuel was first elected to Congress from Illinois's 5th congressional district in 2002. His resignation followed being re-elected to a fourth term.

The governor's office announced that a special primary election would be held on March 3 and special general election would be held on April 7. State law requires the governor to set a date for a congressional special election within five days of a vacancy being created. State law mandates that a general election must be held within 115 days of the vacancy. In an effort to cut costs during the 2008 financial crisis, the date of the special general election coincided with municipal elections scheduled in Chicago, Cook County, and surrounding metropolitan areas.

There were 24 candidates representing three political parties in the March 3 special primary election. The Democrats had 13 candidates; the Republicans had six candidates; and the Greens had five candidates.

Quigley, a 50-year-old Cook County commissioner, won the Democratic Party's primary with 22% of the vote. He defeated a strong field of Democrats, including state representatives John Fritchey (District 11) and Sara Feigenholtz (District 12), physician Victor Forys, and Chicago City Council alderman Patrick J. O'Connor (40th Ward).

Pulido, a Mexican-American and director of the Illinois Minuteman Project, won the Republican Party's primary with 25% of the vote. She defeated a handful of local businessmen, including Tom Hanson, David Anderson, Gregory Bedell, Daniel S. Kay, and Jon Stewart.

Reichel, a 27-year-old activist and political operative, won the Green Party's primary with 34% of the vote. He defeated four other candidates for the party's nomination. Reichel's margin of victory over fellow Green Party nominee Deb Gordils was extremely small—only 11 votes. Reichel won with 166 compared to Gordils' 155.

Nearly a month after the primaries, the three candidates took part in the April 7 special general election. Democratic Party candidate Michael Quigley defeated Republican Party candidate Rosanna Pulido and Green Party candidate Matt Reichel. Quigley won with 30,561 votes (69.2%); Pulido had 10,662 (24.2%) and Reichel had 2,911 (6.6%).

The election did not receive a great deal of coverage, due to the district's heavy Democratic lean. The Republican Party did not put up a top-tier candidate, acknowledging that they were not even focusing on the race This is highlighted in the fact that the Republican nominee was the founder of an anti-illegal-immigration group, running in a district that is one-quarter Hispanic. The real fight was for the Democratic nomination, which would almost assure being elected to Congress. In fact, over 12,000 more votes were cast in the Democratic Primary than there were in the general election.

== Results ==
=== General election ===
Illinois's 5th Congressional District Special Election, 2009
Party	Candidate	Votes	%	±%
Democratic	Mike Quigley	30,561	69.2%	
Republican	Rosanna Pulido	10,662	24.2%	
Green	Matt Reichel	2,911	6.6%	
Turnout		44,134		
Majority		19,899	45.1%	
Democratic hold		Swing		

=== Primary elections ===
==== Democratic Party primary ====
Democratic Primary, Illinois's 5th Congressional District Election, 2009
Party	Candidate	Votes	%	±%
Democratic	Mike Quigley	12,100	22%	
Democratic	John Fritchey	9,813	18%	
Democratic	Sara Feigenholtz	9,166	17%	
Democratic	Victor Forys	6,415	12%	
Democratic	Patrick J. O'Connor	6,371	12%	
Democratic	Charles Wheelan	3,672	7%	
Democratic	Tom Geoghegan	3,336	6%	
Democratic	Paul Bryar	1,111	2%	
Democratic	Jan Donatelli	890	2%	
Democratic	Frank Annunzio	750	1%	
Democratic	Cary Capparelli	713	1%	
Democratic	Carlos Monteagudo	519	1%	
Majority				

==== Republican Party primary ====
Republican Primary, Illinois's 5th Congressional District Election, 2009
Party	Candidate	Votes	%	±%
Republican	Rosanna Pulido	1,001	25%	
Republican	Tom Hanson	855	21%	
Republican	David Anderson	711	18%	
Republican	Gregory Bedell	663	17%	
Republican	Daniel Kay	379	10%	
Republican	Jon Stewart	368	9%	
Majority				

==== Green Party primary ====
Green Primary, Illinois's 5th Congressional District Election, 2009
Party	Candidate	Votes	%	±%
Green	Matt Reichel	166	34%	
Green	Deb Gordils	155	32%	
Green	Mark Fredrickson	71	14%	
Green	Alan Augustson	62	13%	
Green	Simon Ribeiro	37	8%	
Majority				

== Candidates ==
=== Democratic Party candidates ===
- Mike Quigley (campaign website), county commissioner for Cook County
- Frank Annunzio (campaign website), great nephew and namesake of longtime Chicago Rep. Frank Annunzio
- Paul Bryar (campaign website), physician at Northwestern Memorial Hospital and professor at Northwestern University's Feinberg School of Medicine
- Cary Capparelli (campaign website), marketing consultant
- Jan H. Donatelli (campaign website), former Mission Commander in the United States Navy and former airline pilot.
- Sara Feigenholtz (campaign website), State representative
- Victor Forys (campaign website), physician
- John Fritchey (campaign website), State representative
- Thomas Geoghegan (campaign website), labor attorney and author
- Carlos Monteagudo (campaign website), public sector psychiatrist and social entrepreneur
- Patrick J. O'Connor (campaign website), Chicago alderman
- Roger Thompson (campaign website), businessman
- Charles Wheelan (campaign website), Senior lecturer at the University of Chicago and author of Naked Economics: Undressing the Dismal Science

=== Republican Party candidates ===
- Rosanna Pulido (campaign website), State Director of the Illinois Minuteman Project
- David Anderson (campaign website), chemist and small business owner
- Gregory Bedell (campaign website), attorney and lecturer on U.S. constitutional law
- Tom Hanson (campaign website), businessman who ran against Emanuel in 2008 and received 49,000 votes
- Daniel S. Kay (campaign website), businessman, long time Motorcyclist's Rights Activist
- Jon Stewart (campaign website), former professional wrestler, and previous candidate for Illinois's 10th district

=== Green Party candidates ===
- Matt Reichel (campaign website), activist and journalist (formerly candidate for the Democratic nomination)
- Mark Arnold Fredrickson (campaign website), community activist, investigative blogger and financial analyst (2004 Democratic primary candidate)
- Deb Leticia Gordils (campaign website), businesswoman, (2003 33rd Ward Chicago aldermanic candidate)
- Simon Ribeiro (campaign website), former private tutor

=== Other candidates ===
- Alan Augustson, social scientist, planning specialist and management consultant left race due to wife's health issues. Will still appear on ballot
- Pete Dagher, former Bill Clinton and Barack Obama staffer.
- Jay Paul Deratany (campaign website), attorney and former Cook County Board of Review candidate
- Deb Mell, State representative
- Justin Oberman (campaign website), former Transportation Security Administration director
- Eugene Schulter, Chicago alderman
- Joey Vartanian (campaign website), bar owner
- Israel Vasquez
