= Thomas Whelan (disambiguation) =

Thomas Whelan (1898–1921) was an executed Irishman.

Thomas Whelan may also refer to:

- Thomas E. Whelan, U.S. Ambassador to Nicaragua from 1951-1961
- Thomas J. Whelan (mayor) (1922–2002), mayor of Jersey City
- Thomas J. Whelan (judge) (born 1940), United States federal judge
- Tom Whelan (1894–1957), American football player

== See also ==
- Whelan (disambiguation)
