= Michael Whelan (disambiguation) =

Michael Whelan is an American artist and illustrator.

Michael Whelan may also refer to:

- Michael Whelan (poet) (1858–1937), "the Poet of Renous"
- Michael Whelan (scientist) (born 1931), British scientist
- Mickey Whelan, Gaelic football player, selector, and manager
- Mick Whelan (born 1960), General Secretary since 2011 of ASLEF

== See also ==
- Michael Whalen (disambiguation)
- Whelan (disambiguation)
