= Whelan (disambiguation) =

Whelan is a surname.

Whelan may also refer to:

== Places ==
- Whelan Nunatak, Antarctica

== Organizations ==
- Whelan the Wrecker, Australian demolition company
- Whelan Camp, Hamilton County, New York State, USA

== Court cases ==
- Murder of Kerry Whelan, 1995
- Whelan v. Jaslow, a 1966 copyright case
- Whelan v Waitaki Meats Ltd, a 1990 employment contract case

== See also ==
- Wheelan (disambiguation)
- Whelen (disambiguation)
- Whalen (disambiguation)
