= Which Side Are You On? (book) =

1991 book by Thomas Geoghegan

Which Side Are You On? Trying to Be For Labor When It's Flat On Its Back
- Author: Thomas Geoghegan
- Language: English
- Genre: Labor studies
- Publisher: Farrar, Straus and Giroux
- Publication date: August 1, 1991
- Publication place: United States
- Media type: Print (hardcover)
- Pages: 352
- ISBN: 978-0374289195

Which Side Are You On? Trying to Be For Labor When It's Flat on Its Back is a 1991 book by Thomas Geoghegan. It was reissued by The New Press in 2004. It chronicles Geoghegan's work with labor unions in the 1970s and 1980s, particularly his efforts to help steel workers at South Deering's Wisconsin Steel mill.

== Reception ==
Which Side Are You On? was nominated for the 1991 National Book Critics Circle Award. It earned positive reviews. The New York Times referred to it as a "quirky, brilliant career memoir."

== Legacy ==
Its reputation has grown over the years. Hendrik Hertzberg, in a 2009 New Yorker article, called it "one of the finest nonfiction books by a contemporary author...a delightful book about the labor movement." Alex Kotlowitz, in the Chicago Tribune, wrote that it was a "smart, irreverent, personal account of organized labor's woes, from a union sympathizer."
