= Whalan =

Whalan may refer to:

- Whalan (surname)
- Whalan, Minnesota
- Whalan, New South Wales

== See also ==
- Whalen (disambiguation)
