= Michael Flanagan (American politician) =

American politician

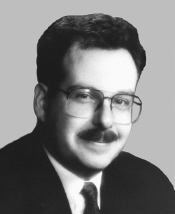

Member of the U.S. House of Representatives from Illinois's 5th district
- In office January 3, 1995 – January 3, 1997
- Preceded by: Dan Rostenkowski
- Succeeded by: Rod Blagojevich

Personal details
- Born: Michael Patrick Flanagan; November 9, 1962 (age 63) Chicago, Illinois, U.S.
- Party: Republican
- Education: Loyola University Chicago (BA, JD)

Military service
- Allegiance: United States
- Branch/service: United States Army
- Years of service: 1984–1988; 1991–1992
- Rank: Captain

Michael Patrick Flanagan (born November 9, 1962) is an American attorney, former politician, and United States Army captain who served as the U.S. representative for Illinois's 5th congressional district from 1995 to 1997. A member of the Republican Party, Flanagan is best known for his victory over eighteen-term congressman Dan Rostenkowski in the 1994 midterm elections.

For beating Rostenkowski, he was given the moniker of the "Rosty-slayer." His victory was one of 58 Republican victories (for a net gain of 54 seats) in the House of Representatives that allowed the party to take control of both houses of Congress, as part of the Republican Revolution.

== Early life and education ==
Flanagan was born in Chicago, Illinois, on November 9, 1962, the second of five sons in a family of Irish-descent. He graduated from Lane Technical High School, and he earned a B.A. from Loyola University in 1984 and a J.D. from Loyola University School of Law in 1988. He served in the United States Army as a field artillery officer from 1984 to 1988 (at Fort Sill in Oklahoma, and at Fort Benning in Georgia), and from1991 to 1992 (during the Gulf War), achieving the rank of captain.

Flanagan was admitted to the Illinois State Bar Association in 1991.

== Political career ==
Flanagan was elected to represent the fifth district of Illinois in the U.S. House of Representatives in 1994, defeating 18-term Congressman and former Ways and Means Committee chairman Dan Rostenkowski, becoming the first Republican to represent a significant portion of Chicago since 1975 and the first to represent this district since 1909. Rostenkowski was under indictment during the election.

The election result was a considerable upset, considering that Flanagan was, according to the Chicago Tribune, "a political neophyte who was underfunded, understaffed and unknown." Due to his victory, Flanagan earned the nicknames of "the accidental congressman" and "the Rosty-slayer."

During his tenure in Congress, Flanagan served on the House Judiciary Committee, the House Government Reform Committee, and the Joint Committee on Telecommunications. He had a conservative record in the House, opposing abortion and gun control, while supporting the death penalty. He also condemned then-President Clinton's national healthcare plan for its government takeover of the healthcare system.

While the Chicago Sun-Times and the Chicago Tribune both endorsed Flanagan for reelection in 1996, he was regarded as a heavy underdog against the Democratic challenger, State Representative Rod Blagojevich, being a conservative Republican in a strongly Democratic district. Before Flanagan's election, the district and its predecessors had been in Democratic hands for all but one year since 1909. As expected, the district reverted to form; Blagojevich soundly defeated Flanagan, and Bill Clinton easily carried the district. Flanagan's loss was one of the 12 seats first-term Republican candidates lost in the 1996 election. Proving just how Democratic this district was and still is, no Republican has tallied more than 35 percent of the vote since Flanagan left office. As of 2024, he is the last Republican to represent a significant part of Chicago in the U.S. House.

=== Electoral history ===
ELECTORAL HISTORY
Year	Office	Winning Candidate	Party	Pct	Opponent	Party	Pct
1994	U.S. House	Michael Flanagan	Republican	54%	Dan Rostenkowski (inc.)	Democrat	46%
1996	U.S. House	Rod Blagojevich	Democrat	64%	Michael Flanagan (inc.)	Republican	36%

== Post-congressional career ==
Flanagan moved to Washington, D.C., in 1999 and is currently the president of Flanagan Consulting LLC. He has been active in Illinois Boys State since 1979. Flanagan worked in Iraq for two years for the U.S. State Department, as part of a team sent to help set up democratic institutions in the country.

U.S. House of Representatives
Preceded by Dan Rostenkowski	Member of the U.S. House of Representatives from Illinois's 5th congressional district 1995–1997	Succeeded by Rod Blagojevich
U.S. order of precedence (ceremonial)
Preceded by Mel Reynolds as Former U.S. Representative	Order of precedence of the United States as Former U.S. Representative	Succeeded by Debbie Halvorson as Former U.S. Representative
