= Mike Quigley =

American politician (born 1958)

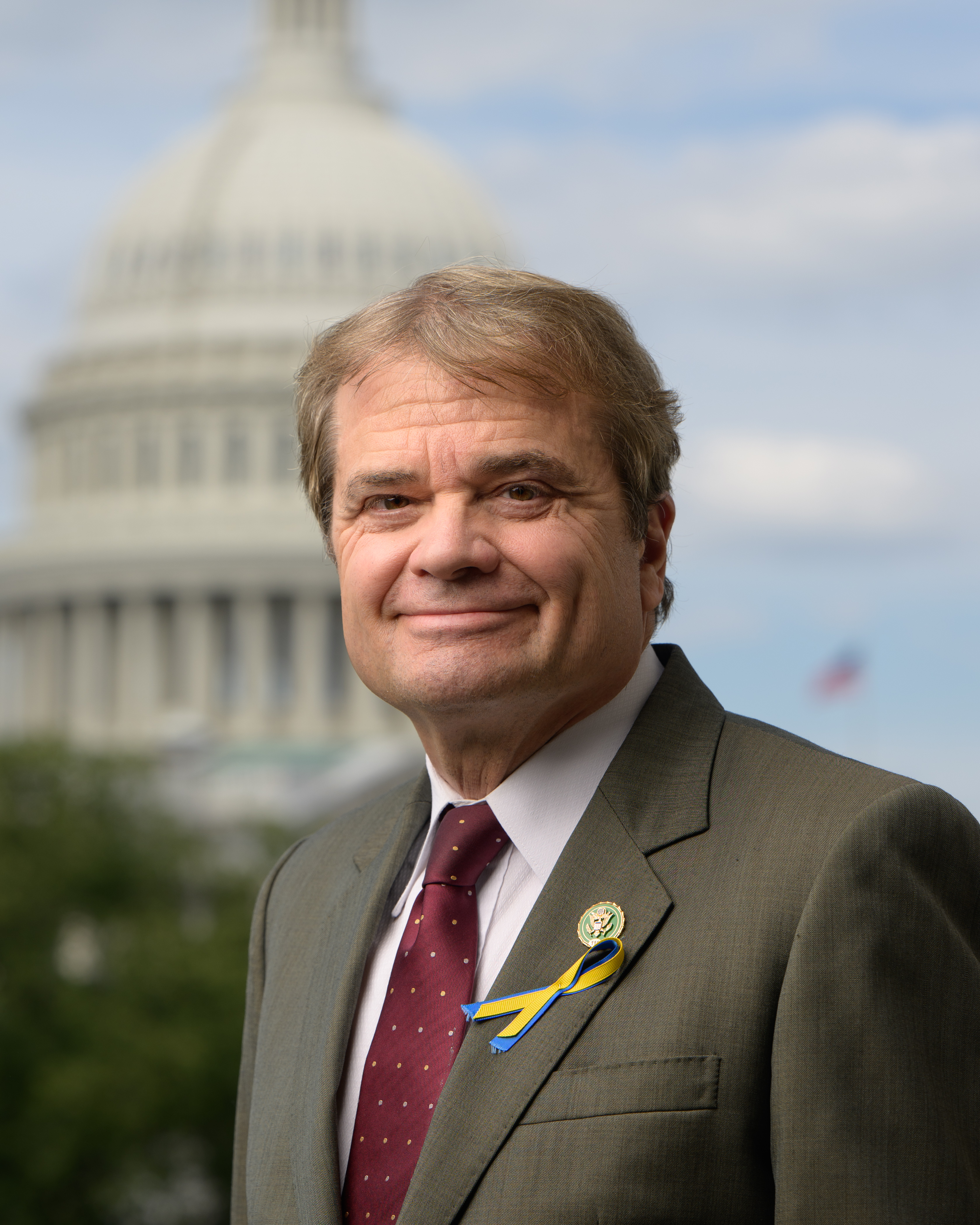
- Official portrait, 2023

Member of the U.S. House of Representatives from Illinois's 5th district
- Incumbent
- Assumed office April 7, 2009 (Note: Quigley's official service begins on the date of the special election, while he was not sworn in until April 21, 2009.)
- Preceded by: Rahm Emanuel

Member of the Cook County Board of Commissioners from the 10th district
- In office 1998–2009
- Preceded by: Maria Pappas
- Succeeded by: Bridget Gainer

Personal details
- Born: Michael Bruce Quigley; October 17, 1958 (age 68) Indianapolis, Indiana, U.S.
- Party: Democratic
- Spouse: Barbara Quigley (m. 1999)
- Children: 2
- Education: Roosevelt University (BA); University of Chicago (MPP); Loyola University Chicago (JD)
- Website: House website Campaign website
- Quigley's voice Quigley on inequalities in the distribution of COVID-19 assistance. Recorded September 22, 2020

Michael Bruce Quigley (/ˈkwɪɡli/ KWIG-lee; born October 17, 1958) is an American politician serving as the U.S. representative for Illinois's 5th congressional district since the April 7, 2009 special election. The district includes most of Chicago's North Side and several of its western suburbs. He is a member of the Democratic Party. Quigley is a former member of the Cook County Board of Commissioners, where he represented Chicago's northside neighborhoods of Lakeview, Uptown, and Rogers Park. He previously taught environmental policy and Chicago politics as an adjunct professor at Loyola University Chicago. He is currently running for mayor of Chicago in the 2027 election.

Quigley will become the dean of Illinois's congressional delegation when Senator Dick Durbin retires in 2027.

== Early life, education, and early political career ==
Quigley was raised in Carol Stream, Illinois, where he graduated from Glenbard North High School in 1977. He then attended Roosevelt University, where he earned his bachelor's degree. Quigley moved into the Lakeview area of Chicago in 1982, and became involved in community activities. He attended the Loyola University Chicago School of Law, where he earned a Juris Doctor degree, and the University of Chicago, where he earned a master's degree in public policy.

The start of Quigley's political career saw him serve as a chief aide to Chicago Alderman Bernie Hansen. In 1991, he ran for 46th ward alderman with the support of Mayor Richard M. Daley, but lost a runoff election to incumbent Helen Shiller.

== Cook County Board of Commissioners (1998–2009) ==
Quigley was first elected to the Cook County Board of Commissioners in 1998, succeeding Maria Pappas, who was elected Cook County Treasurer. During his tenure, he gained a reputation as a reformer, opposing tax hikes that were supported by Cook County Board President John Stroger and later his son and successor Todd Stroger. Quigley contended the county could operate more efficiently and presented reports to support his position. He also challenged the practice of finding jobs for Democratic officials with the Cook County Forest Preserve District.

== U.S. House of Representatives (2009–present) ==
=== Elections ===
==== 2009 ====
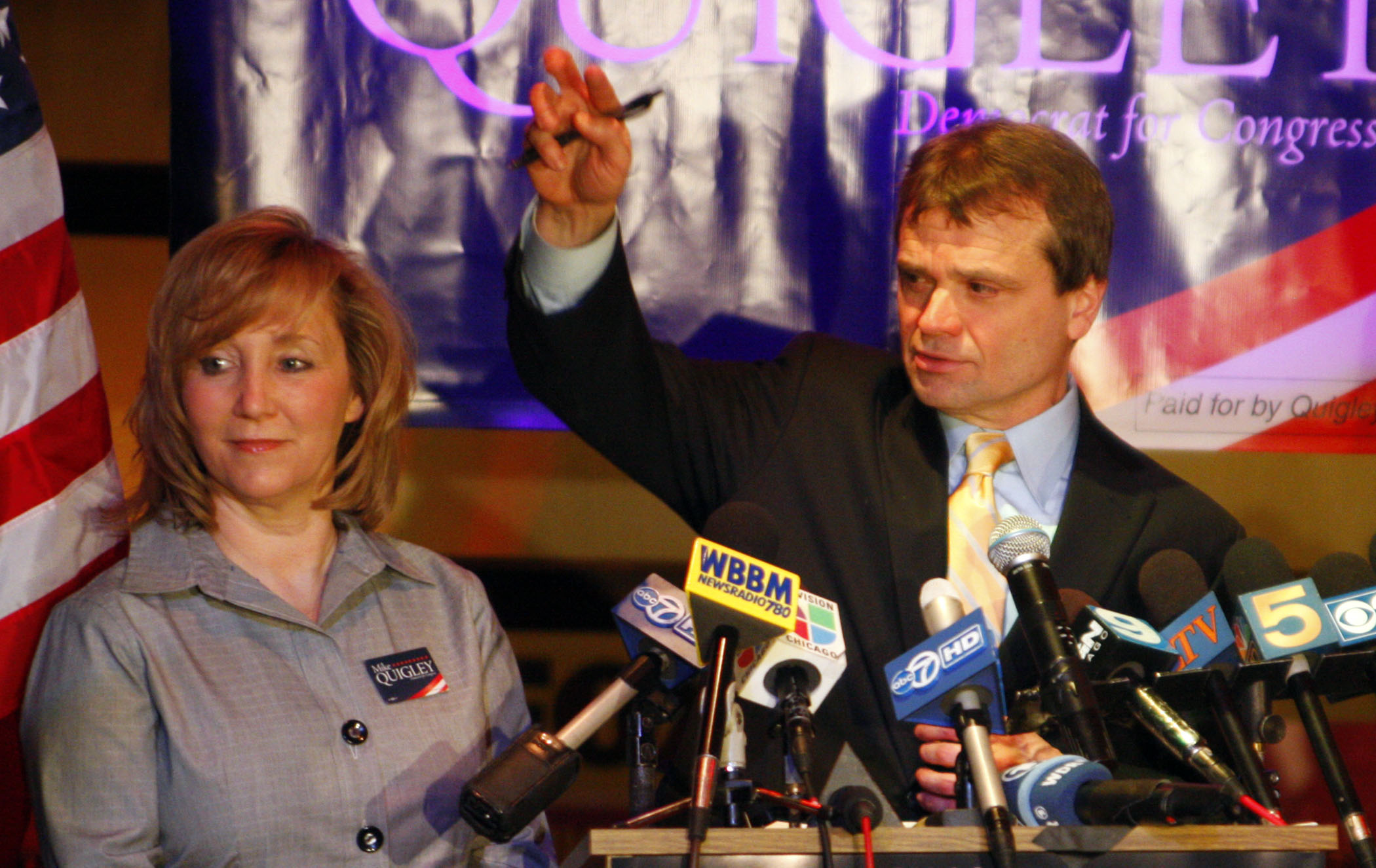
Quigley delivers his victory speech for 5th Congressional District Democratic primary in March 2009.

In early 2009, incumbent U.S. Representative Rahm Emanuel of Illinois's 5th congressional district resigned to become White House Chief of Staff to newly elected President Barack Obama. The congressional vacancy was filled via the special election. Quigley was one of 12 candidates to file in the Democratic primary—the real contest in this heavily Democratic district. He was endorsed by the Chicago Sun-Times, which called him "a constant advocate for fiscal responsibility and a watchdog against waste and corruption". He was also endorsed by the Chicago Tribune, which cited Quigley's efforts to improve county government, noting, "If Quigley's ideas had all been put in place, the county would not be crying now for more money". He won the March special primary with 22% of the vote. The second-place candidate, State Representative John Fritchey, received 18%. After the primary, Quigley won the April special election with 69% of the vote over Republican challenger Rosanna Pulido. The district and its predecessors have been in Democratic hands for all but three years since 1909.

==== 2010 ====
Quigley won reelection to his first full term in 2010 with 71% of the vote.

==== 2012 ====
After redistricting, Quigley's district was pushed into DuPage County. The new district absorbed the home of 13th district Republican Congresswoman Judy Biggert. But Biggert opted to run in the 11th district, the successor to the old 13th. The old 5th is only slightly less Democratic than its predecessor; Obama won the district in 2008 with 70% (down three points from the old 5th), and 2010 Democratic U.S. Senate nominee Alexi Giannoulias carried it with 55% of the vote. No Democrat filed to run against him. Only one Republican filed, self-employed businessman Dan Schmitt.

=== Tenure ===
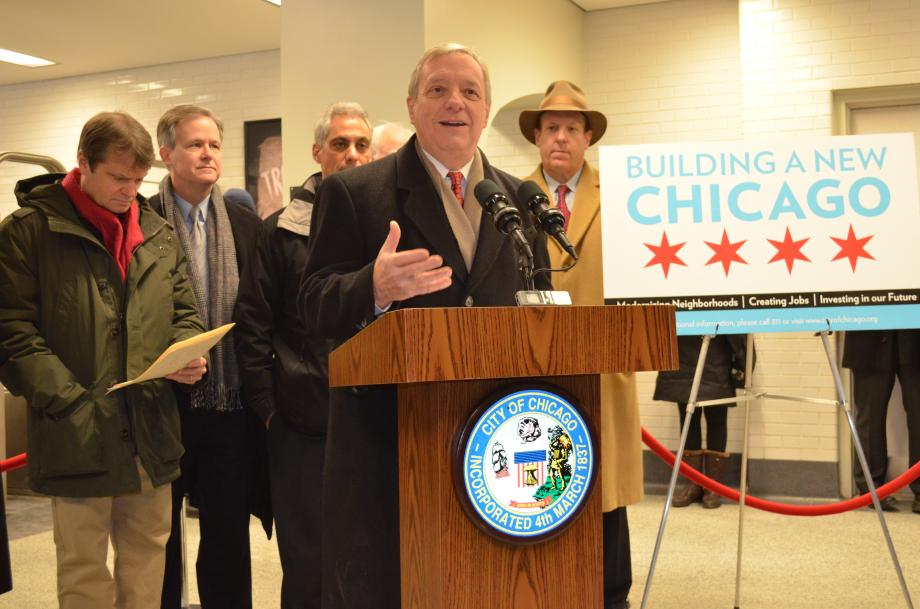
Quigley with Senator Dick Durbin and Chicago Mayor Rahm Emanuel in January 2014

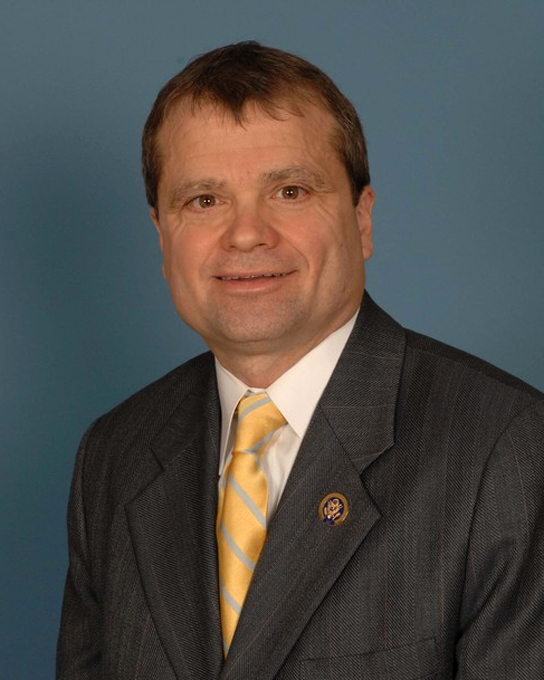
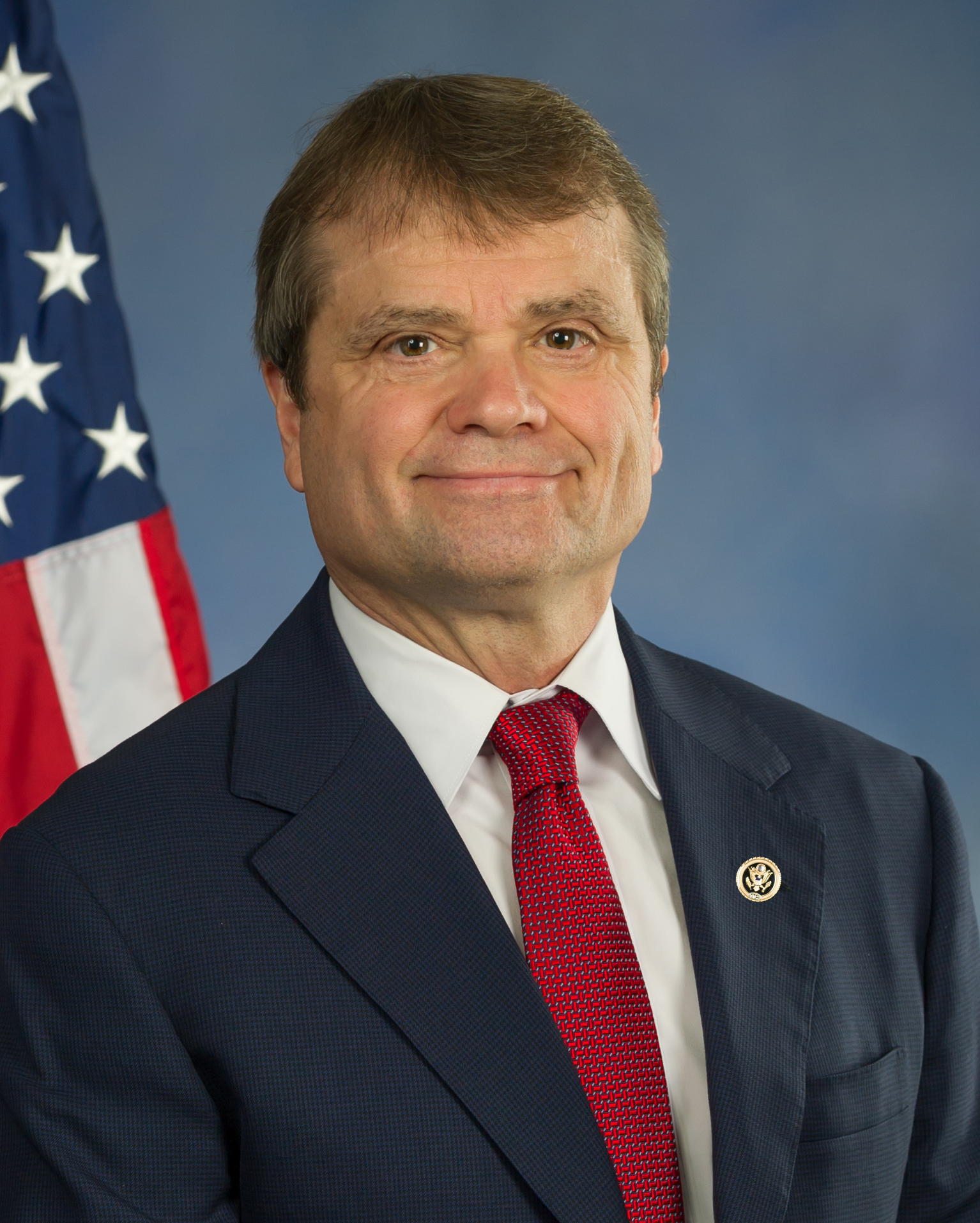
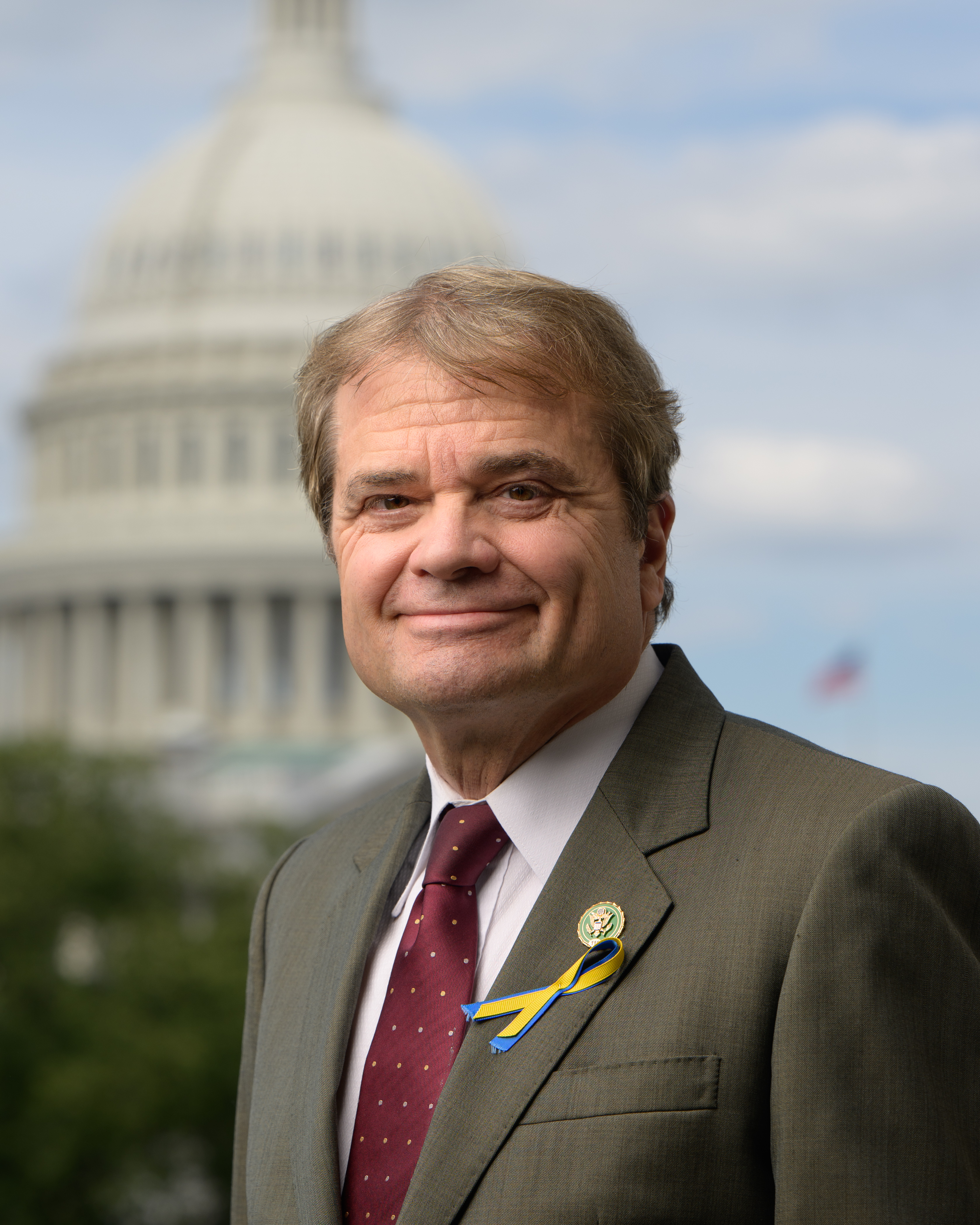
Quigley's official House portraits over the years.

On July 12, 2017, Quigley introduced H. R. 2884, "The Communications Over Various Feeds Electronically for Engagement Act (COVFEFE Act)". The bill would require the National Archives to preserve and store social media posts by the President of the United States. It was referred to the House Committee on Oversight and Government Reform on the same day, yet saw no further congressional action.

On September 30, 2023, Quigley was the sole Democrat to vote against Republican-introduced legislation to keep the U.S. government funded, citing its lack of aid to Ukraine. Quigley voted in favor of three military aid package supplementals for Ukraine, Israel, and Taiwan respectively in April 2024, along with most Democrats.

Quigley voted with President Joe Biden's stated position 100% of the time in the 117th Congress, according to a FiveThirtyEight analysis.

On July 5, 2024, Quigley called for Joe Biden to withdraw from the 2024 United States presidential election.

==== Gun control ====
In May 2011, Quigley sponsored an amendment to the Patriot Act prohibiting the sale of weapons to people on the FBI's Terrorist Watch List. He believed that the Republican limitation of civil liberties under the Patriot Act contradicted their unwillingness to limit Second Amendment rights. The amendment came under fire from Republican Representatives James Sensenbrenner Jr. and Louie Gohmert, who argued that it would infringe on the Second Amendment rights of those mistakenly placed on the Terrorist Watch List. The bill failed on a party-line House Judiciary panel vote, 21–11.

==== Public health ====
In March 2021, Quigley announced his support for the Medicare for All Act of 2021, which sought to provide comprehensive benefits to each American, along with no-cost long-term care insurance for seniors..

==== Environment ====
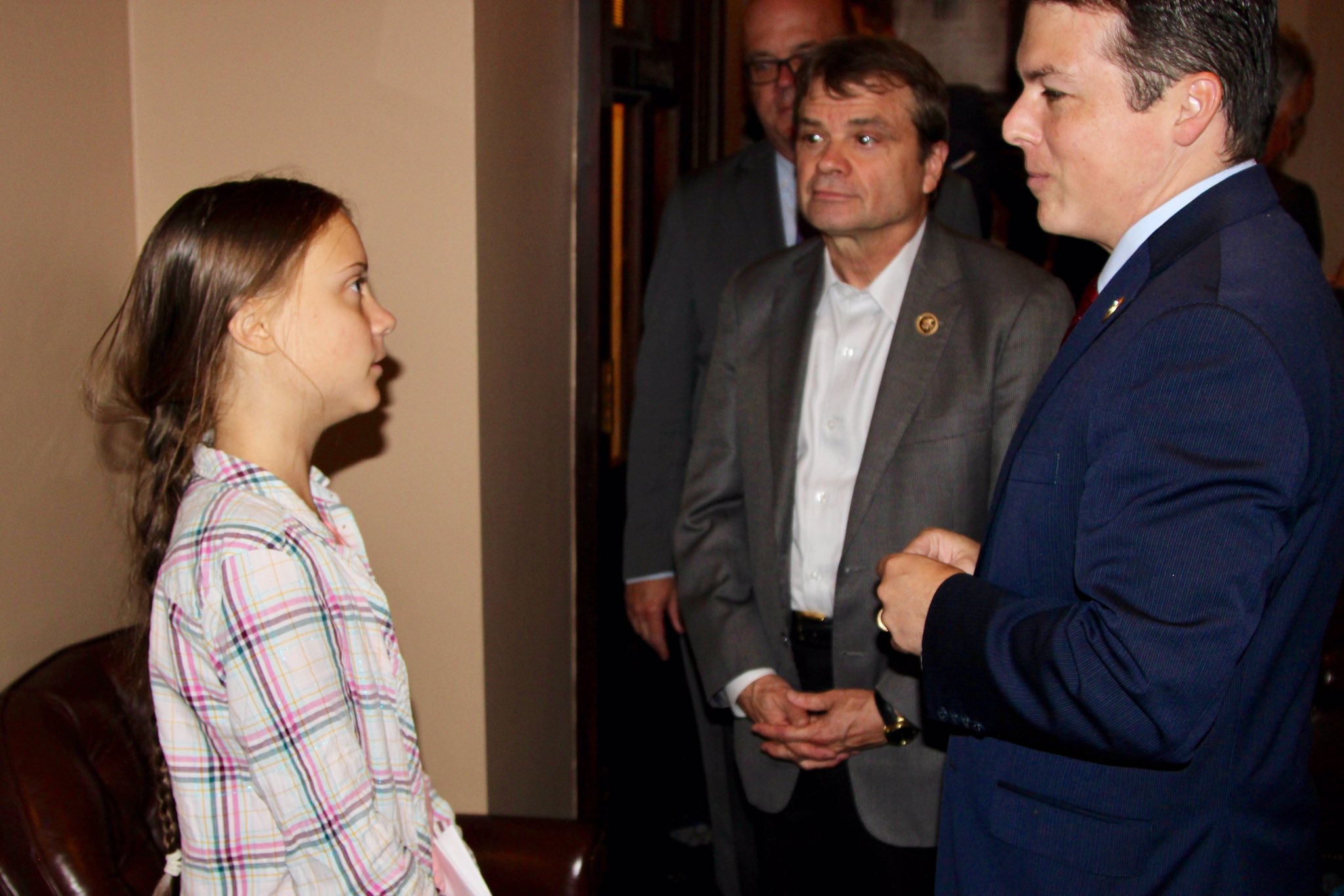
Quigley (center) with fellow Congressman Brendan Boyle and Greta Thunberg in 2019

A Sierra Club member since high school, Quigley initially joined politics because of his desire to help the environment through legislation. He has enacted this desire through supporting the American Clean Energy and Security Act, a 2009 bill to create an emissions trading plan which passed in the House of Representatives, but was defeated in the Senate.

==== Animal welfare ====
Quigley is an author of the Federal Bird Safe Buildings Act, which he reintroduces each Congress. The legislation would require federal buildings to be constructed with bird-safe materials and features to reduce bird–window collisions. The proposal mirrors legislation Quigley authored as a Cook County commissioner in 2008, the first bird-safe building legislation in the United States.

==== Veterans ====
Quigley has worked to improve healthcare and education opportunities for veterans. His district office is also known to make services available to veterans whenever they need it, such as helping one veteran receive medals that he had been waiting over 20 years to receive. In 2013, Quigley introduced a bill to the House to prevent veterans from entering into debt to pay for tuition before GI benefits are received. His hope was to provide greater educational opportunities to veterans with this bill.

==== Abortion ====
Quigley supports reproductive rights, and voted against banning federal health coverage for abortions. He also supports federal funding for family planning and sex education, as well as creating more preventive steps to avoid unwanted pregnancies altogether.

==== LGBTQ rights ====
Quigley supports LGBTQ rights, and showed his support in 2012 by participating in National Coming Out Day as a show of solidarity. He has called for the FDA to revoke its ban on allowing blood donations from gay and bisexual men.

In September 2014, Quigley was one of 69 members of Congress to sign a letter to then-FDA commissioner Sylvia Burwell requesting that the FDA revise its policy banning donation of corneas and other tissues by men who have had sex with another man in the preceding five years.

=== Committee assignments ===
For the 119th Congress:

- Committee on Appropriations
  - Subcommittee on the Legislative Branch
  - Subcommittee on National Security, Department of State, and Related Programs
  - Subcommittee on Transportation, Housing and Urban Development, and Related Agencies
- Permanent Select Committee on Intelligence
  - Subcommittee on Defense Intelligence and Overhead Architecture
  - Subcommittee on Open Source Intelligence

=== Caucus memberships ===
- Congressional Equality Caucus
- Congressional Arts Caucus
- Congressional Transparency Caucus
- Congressional Ukraine Caucus
- New Democrat Coalition
- United States Congressional International Conservation Caucus
- U.S.–Japan Caucus
- Veterinary Medicine Caucus
- Congressional Ukrainian Caucus
- United States–China Working Group
- Rare Disease Caucus
- Congressional Caucus on Turkey and Turkish Americans
- Congressional Taiwan Caucus

== Chicago mayoral ambitions ==
=== 2019 and 2023 elections ===
Quigley considered running for mayor of Chicago in 2019, after Rahm Emanuel indicated he would not seek reelection, but ultimately did not. In early 2022, it was reported that Quigley was considering a run for mayor in 2023. In April 2022, he announced he would not enter the race, and subsequently endorsed U.S. Representative Chuy Garcia's campaign.

=== 2027 campaign ===
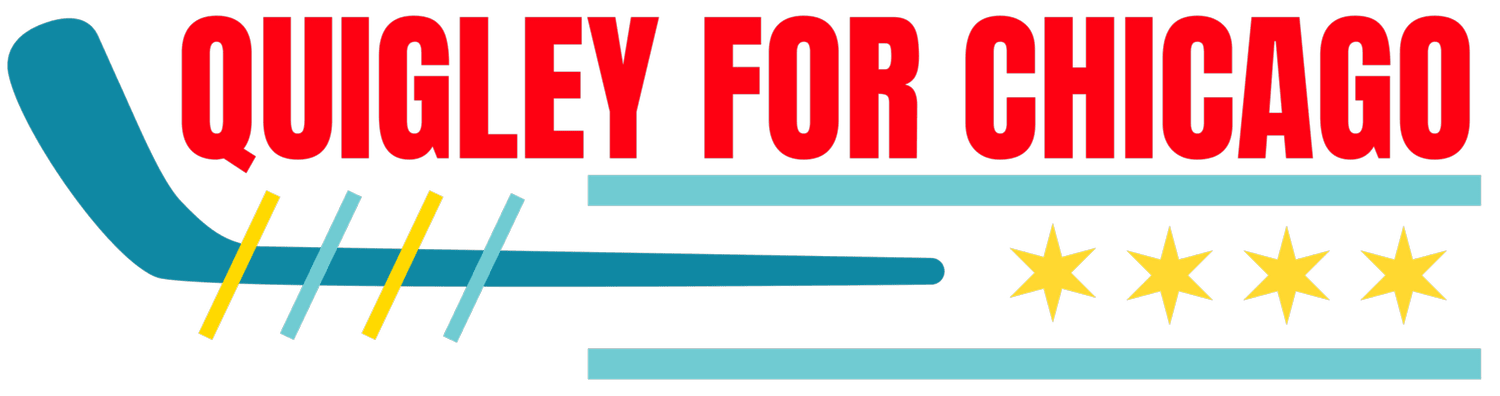
Quigley’s 2027 mayoral campaign logo

In late December 2025, it was announced that Quigley began fundraising for a possible mayoral campaign in 2027 with a political committee named Friends of Mike Quigley. On January 6, 2026, Quigley announced that he would run for mayor. He formally launched his campaign on June 27, 2026 at the Uptown Theatre.

== Electoral history ==
=== Cook County Board of Commissioners ===
1998

1998 Cook County Board of Commissioners 10th district Democratic primary
| Party | Candidate | Votes | % |
|---|---|---|---|
| Democratic | Mike Quigley (incumbent) | 11,185 | 44.78 |
| Democratic | Ralph Martire | 6,799 | 27.22 |
| Democratic | Peter Miller | 2,604 | 10.43 |
| Democratic | Brian J. Berg | 2,536 | 10.15 |
| Democratic | Stefanos "Scott" Venable | 1,854 | 7.42 |
| Total votes | | 24,978 | 100 |

1998 Cook County Board of Commissioners 10th district election
| Party | Candidate | Votes | % |
|---|---|---|---|
| Democratic | Mike Quigley (incumbent) | 56,208 | 100 |
| Total votes | | 56,208 | 100 |

2002

2002 Cook County Board of Commissioners 10th district Democratic primary
| Party | Candidate | Votes | % |
|---|---|---|---|
| Democratic | Mike Quigley (incumbent) | 22,357 | 72.04 |
| Democratic | Mary Ellen E. Daly | 12,127 | 27.96 |
| Total votes | | 34,484 | 100 |

2002 Cook County Board of Commissioners 10th district election
| Party | Candidate | Votes | % |
|---|---|---|---|
| Democratic | Mike Quigley (incumbent) | 60,457 | 100 |
| Total votes | | 60,457 | 100 |

2006

2006 Cook County Board of Commissioners 10th district Democratic primary
| Party | Candidate | Votes | % |
|---|---|---|---|
| Democratic | Mike Quigley (incumbent) | 26,207 | 100 |
| Total votes | | 26,207 | 100 |

2006 Cook County Board of Commissioners 10th district election
| Party | Candidate | Votes | % |
|---|---|---|---|
| Democratic | Mike Quigley (incumbent) | 62,905 | 100 |
| Total votes | | 62,905 | 100 |

=== Congressional ===
2009 (special)

Illinois 5th Congressional District Special Democratic Primary, 2009
| Party | Candidate | Votes | % |
|---|---|---|---|
| Democratic | Mike Quigley | 12,118 | 22.04 |
| Democratic | John A. Fritchey | 9,835 | 17.89 |
| Democratic | Sara Feigenholtz | 9,194 | 16.72 |
| Democratic | Victor A. Forys | 6,428 | 11.67 |
| Democratic | Patrick J. O'Connor | 6,388 | 11.62 |
| Democratic | Charles J. Wheelan | 3,681 | 6.69 |
| Democratic | Tom Geoghegan | 3,342 | 6.08 |
| Democratic | Paul J. Bryar | 1,111 | 2.02 |
| Democratic | Jan H. Donatelli | 892 | 1.62 |
| Democratic | Frank Annunzio | 755 | 1.37 |
| Democratic | Cary Capparelli | 714 | 1.30 |
| Democratic | Carlos A. Monteagudo | 521 | 0.95 |
| Democratic | Roger A. Thompson III | 10 | 0.02 |
| Total votes | | 54,989 | 100.0 |

Illinois 5th Congressional District Special General Election, 2009
| Party | Candidate | Votes | % |
|---|---|---|---|
| Democratic | Mike Quigley | 30,561 | 69.24 |
| Republican | Rosanna Pulido | 10,662 | 24.16 |
| Green | Matt Reichel | 2,911 | 6.60 |
| Write-in votes | Frances E. Farley | 3 | 0.01 |
| Write-in Votes | Goran Davidovac | 1 | 0.00 |
| Total votes | | 44,138 | 100.0 |

2010

Illinois 5th Congressional District Democratic Primary, 2010
| Party | Candidate | Votes | % |
|---|---|---|---|
| Democratic | Mike Quigley (incumbent) | 56,667 | 100 |
| Total votes | | 56,667 | 100 |

Illinois 5th Congressional District General Election, 2010
| Party | Candidate | Votes | % |
|---|---|---|---|
| Democratic | Mike Quigley (incumbent) | 108,360 | 70.62 |
| Republican | David Ratowitz | 38,935 | 25.38 |
| Green | Matthew Reichel | 6,140 | 4.0 |
| Total votes | | 153,435 | 100.0 |

2012

Illinois 5th Congressional District Democratic Primary, 2012
| Party | Candidate | Votes | % |
|---|---|---|---|
| Democratic | Mike Quigley (incumbent) | 37,967 | 100 |
| Total votes | | 37,967 | 100 |

Illinois 5th Congressional District General Election, 2012
| Party | Candidate | Votes | % |
|---|---|---|---|
| Democratic | Mike Quigley (incumbent) | 177,729 | 65.73 |
| Republican | Dan Schmitt | 77,289 | 28.59 |
| Green | Nancy Wade | 15,359 | 5.68 |
| Total votes | | 270,377 | 100.0 |

2014

Illinois 5th Congressional District Democratic Primary, 2014
| Party | Candidate | Votes | % |
|---|---|---|---|
| Democratic | Mike Quigley (incumbent) | 26,364 | 100 |
| Total votes | | 26,364 | 100 |

Illinois 5th Congressional District General Election, 2014
| Party | Candidate | Votes | % |
|---|---|---|---|
| Democratic | Mike Quigley (incumbent) | 116,364 | 63.23 |
| Republican | Vince Kolber | 56,350 | 30.62 |
| Green | Nancy Wade | 11,305 | 6.14 |
| Total votes | | 184,019 | 100.0 |

2016

Illinois 5th Congressional District Democratic Primary, 2016
| Party | Candidate | Votes | % |
|---|---|---|---|
| Democratic | Mike Quigley (incumbent) | 127,679 | 100 |
| Total votes | | 127,679 | 100 |

Illinois 5th Congressional District General Election, 2016
| Party | Candidate | Votes | % |
|---|---|---|---|
| Democratic | Mike Quigley (incumbent) | 212,842 | 67.84 |
| Republican | Vince Kolber | 86,222 | 27.48 |
| Green | Rob Sherman | 14,657 | 4.67 |
| Write-in votes | Michael Krynski | 3 | 0.00 |
| Total votes | | 313,724 | 100.0 |

2018

Illinois 5th Congressional District Democratic Primary, 2018
| Party | Candidate | Votes | % |
|---|---|---|---|
| Democratic | Mike Quigley (incumbent) | 66,254 | 62.46 |
| Democratic | Sameena Mustafa | 25,591 | 24.13 |
| Democratic | Benjamin Thomas Wolf | 10,032 | 9.46 |
| Democratic | Steven J. Schwartzberg | 4,196 | 3.96 |
| Total votes | | 106,073 | 100.0 |

Illinois 5th Congressional District General Election, 2018
| Party | Candidate | Votes | % |
|---|---|---|---|
| Democratic | Mike Quigley (incumbent) | 213,992 | 76.66 |
| Republican | Tom Hanson | 65,134 | 23.33 |
| Write-in votes | Frank Rowder | 5 | 0.00 |
| Total votes | | 279,131 | 100.0 |

2020

Illinois 5th Congressional District Democratic Primary, 2020
| Party | Candidate | Votes | % |
|---|---|---|---|
| Democratic | Mike Quigley (incumbent) | 97,865 | 75.10 |
| Democratic | Brian Burns | 32,440 | 24.90 |
| Total votes | | 142,062 | 100.0 |

Illinois 5th Congressional District General Election, 2020
| Party | Candidate | Votes | % |
|---|---|---|---|
| Democratic | Mike Quigley (incumbent) | 255,661 | 70.77 |
| Republican | Tommy Hanson | 96,200 | 26.63 |
| Green | Thomas J. Wilda | 9,408 | 2.60 |
| Write-in votes | Frank Rowder | 2 | 0.00 |
| Total votes | | 361,271 | 100.0 |

2022

Illinois 5th Congressional District General Election, 2022
| Party | Candidate | Votes | % |
|---|---|---|---|
| Democratic | Mike Quigley (incumbent) | 190,999 | 69.56 |
| Republican | Tommy Hanson | 79,112 | 28.81 |
| Independent | Jerico Matias Cruz | 4,439 | 1.61 |
| Total votes | | 274,550 | 100.0 |

2024

Illinois 5th Congressional District General Election, 2024
| Party | Candidate | Votes | % |
|---|---|---|---|
| Democratic | Mike Quigley (incumbent) | 251,025 | 68.97 |
| Republican | Tommy Hanson | 112,931 | 31.03 |
| Write-in votes | Frank Rowder | 9 | 0.00 |
| Total votes | | 363,965 | 100.0 |

== Awards and recognition ==
In 2009, Quigley was inducted into the Chicago Gay and Lesbian Hall of Fame as a Friend of the Community.

== Personal life ==
Quigley and his wife Barbara have two daughters.

U.S. House of Representatives
| Preceded by Rahm Emanuel | Member of the U.S. House of Representatives from Illinois's 5th congressional district 2009–present | Incumbent |
U.S. order of precedence (ceremonial)
| Preceded by Paul Tonko | United States representatives by seniority 72nd | Succeeded by Judy Chu |
