= Whelan =

The family name Whelan /ˈhwiːlən/ is an anglicisation of the Irish surname Ó Faoláin. The surname originates from the Middle Irish Úa Faeláin (plural Uí Faeláin) the name of the 10th to 11th century ruling dynasty of the Déisi, a population group inhabiting the area of the modern counties of Waterford and Kilkenny in the Early Middle Ages.

The word faolán is derived from the Old Irish word faelán meaning a young (small) wolf; -án being of the diminutive suffix in Irish. Ó (anglicised as O') derives from the Old Irish úa, meaning "grandson", or more figuratively "patrilineal descendant". The patronym that follows is always in the genitive case, in accordance with Irish grammatical rules, and is normally marked by an "i" following the final vowel. Therefore, the name Faelán, becomes Úa Faeláin as a patronym in Middle Irish, from which is derived Ó Faoláin in Modern Irish, of which in turn Whelan, Phelan, O'Phelan etc. are anglicisations.

According to the legendary history of Ireland, about 300 A.D., the Déisi settled on the site of Dungarvan, County Waterford. In the 12th and 13th centuries, during the early Anglo-Norman period, records of a political nature relating to the Déisi and the descendants of the Uí Faeláin dynastic group decline.

The Faelán referred to is Faelán mac Cormac, who is recorded in the Annals of Inishfallen as having succeeded his father as king of the Déisi in 966. The first person referred to as úa Faeláin is his grandson Mothla mac Domnall, or Mothla úa Faeláin, who was king of the Déisi until his death at the Battle of Clontarf in 1014, and whose head is recorded in the Annals of Ulster as having been interred with Brian Ború in Armagh. During this period however, Irish patronyms had not yet petrified into surnames proper.

According to the Annals of the Four Masters:

The Age of Christ, 1170.

M1170.11

Robert Fitz Stephen and Richard, son of Gilbert, i.e. Earl Strongbow, came from England into Ireland with a numerous force, and many knights and archers, in the army of Mac Murchadha [Dermot MacMurrough], to contest Leinster for him, and to disturb the Irish of Ireland in general; and Mac Murchadha gave his daughter to the Earl Strongbow for coming into his army. They took Loch Garman [Wexford town; a stone walled Norse settlement], and entered Port-Lairge [Waterford town; a Norse settlement] by force; and they took Gillemaire, the officer of the fortress, and Ua Faelain, lord of the Deisi, and his son, and they killed seven hundred persons there.

By the beginning of the thirteenth century, most of the territory of the Déisi was absorbed into the Anglo-Norman colony. The surname Whelan remains common in County Waterford and in the adjoining part of County Kilkenny, particularly in the barony of Iverk.

The earliest anglicised forms of the Ó Faoláin name were Felan, Faelan, Hyland, with many other similar variants, including Whelan and Phelan in counties Waterford and Kilkenny. Whelan and Whalen are the most prevalent forms in modern times, and combined are placed seventy-ninth in the list of the hundred most common surnames in Ireland. With Phelan added, the name takes forty-fourth place. Another meaning for Whelan was originated from the earliest version of Irish, the meaning was "clan of the wolf".

== Whelans ==
- Aileen Whelan – English footballer
- Anthony Whelan – Irish footballer
- Arleen Whelan – American actress
- Bill Whelan – composer of Riverdance
- Brian Whelan – painter, author and filmmaker; paintings in public/private collections worldwide; 3 books published and one film in the UK National Gallery of Art
- Charles Wheelan – American author
- Charlie Whelan – served as a special advisor in Her Majesty's Treasury under Gordon Brown
- Chris Whelan – Middlesex cricketer
- Christine Whelan – American author, journalist and commentator
- Ciara Whelan - Irish television presenter
- Ciarán Whelan – Irish Gaelic footballer
- Dave Whelan – Former professional footballer with Blackburn Rovers and the current owner of Wigan Athletic
- David Whelan – English golf instructor and former golfer
- Dianne Whelan - Canadian traveller and documentary film-maker
- Dutee A. Whelan, American politician
- Edward Whelan – Canadian politician
- Edward Whelan – A member of the O'Shea and Whelan family
- Elizabeth Whelan – American author, epidemiologist, and consumer advocate
- Emily Whelan – Irish footballer
- Eugene Whelan – Canadian politician
- Fern Whelan – English footballer
- Gary Whelan – actor (played Brendan Kearney in Ballykissangel amongst other things)
- Gavan Whelan – drummer for the band James
- Gemma Whelan – English actress and comedian
- George J. Whelan – former mayor of San Francisco
- Glenn Whelan – Republic of Ireland international footballer
- Gloria Whelan – American author, winner of the National Book Award for Children's Literature (2000)
- Hannah Whelan – British gymnast, competed at the 2008 and 2012 Olympics
- Heather Whelan - Irish cricketer
- James R. Whelan - journalist and educator
- Jill Whelan – American actress
- Jim Whelan (1948–2017) - American politician
- John W. Whelan- American politician
- Jordan Whelan – American musician
- Julia Whelan – American actress
- Leo Whelan (1892–1956) - Irish painter
- Liam Whelan – former Manchester United footballer who died in the Munich air disaster. Also known as Billy Whelan
- Máire Whelan – Attorney General of Ireland
- Marcus Whelan – Australian Rules footballer
- Marty Whelan- Irish radio personality
- Matthew Whelan – Indigenous Australian rules footballer
- Michael Whelan – American artist
- Michaele Whelan – American academic administrator
- Nicky Whelan – Australian actress from Neighbours
- Noel Whelan – Former Premiership footballer
- Nuala O'Faolain – Irish journalist
- Patrick J. Whelan – Visionary pioneer of financial electronic platforms
- Patrick J. Whelan – tailor who was hanged for assassinating D'Arcy McGee
- Patrick Whelan - Irish volunteer killed in the Easter Rising of 1916
- Paul Whelan (born 1970), American marine
- Paul Whelan (politician) (1943–2019), New South Wales state politician
- Paul F. Whelan, Irish academic
- Peter Whelan - academic lawyer
- Peter Whelan (priest)
- Ronnie Whelan – played for Liverpool Football Club and is the son of Ronnie Whelan, Sr. who was also a footballer
- Seán Ó Faoláin – born John Francis Whelan, writer
- Thomas Whelan – Irish IRA Volunteer, one of The Forgotten Ten
- Thomas J. Whelan – Irish-American mayor
- Thomas J. Whelan – American judge
- Tom Whelan – American football player
- Tommy Whelan – American football player
- Tony Whelan – former Manchester United footballer
- Wendy Whelan – American ballet dancer and associate artistic director of New York City Ballet

=== Fictional characters ===
- Abby Whelan - character on Scandal

== See also ==
- Wheelan (surname)
