= Wheelan =

Wheelan is a surname. Notable people and fictional characters with the name include:

== People ==
- Belle Wheelan (born 1951) U.S. educator
- Brooks Wheelan (born 1986) U.S. standup comic
- Charles Wheelan (born 1966) U.S. journalist
- Ed Wheelan (1888-1966) U.S. cartoonist
- Fairfax Henry Wheelan (1856-1915) U.S. businessman
- William E. Wheelan (1872-1921) U.S. politician

== Fictional characters ==
- Doc Wheelan, a character from the 1980 film Dark Forces, a.k.a. Harlequin (film).

== See also ==
- Whelan (surname)
