= Ó Faoláin =

Ó Faoláin (pronounced [oː ˈfˠeːlˠaːnʲ]), or O'Faolain, is an Irish surname meaning "wolf", anglicized as Phelan or Whelan. Notable people with this surname include:

- Seán Ó Faoláin (1900–1991), influential figure in 20th-century Irish culture
- Eugenius Ó Faoláin, Bishop of Kilmacduagh during 1409–1418
- Julia O'Faolain (1932–2020), London-born Irish novelist and short story writer
- Nuala O'Faolain (1940–2008), Irish journalist
- Patrick James Whelan (1989-Present), Model born in Cairns Queensland
