= William Phelan =

William Phelan may refer to:

- Bill Phelan (1915–1973), Australian politician
- William J. Phelan, mayor of Quincy, Massachusetts, from 2002 to 2008
- William Phelan, Irish churchman, his Remains published by John Jebb
