= Frederick Whelen =

Frederick Whelen (16 October 1867 – 1955) was a British theatre director.

Born in London, Whelen was educated there, and in Germany. In 1900, he married the actor Elaine Sandham.

Whelen joined the Fabian Society in 1892, and served on its executive for several years between 1896 and 1903. He was also on the executive of the London Reform Union, and was active in local politics in Chelsea. In addition, he served as a governor of the London School of Economics, and wrote the book London Government.

In 1899, Whelen founded the Stage Society, and soon became the secretary to Herbert Beerbohm Tree, manager of His Majesty's Theatre. With Henry Dana, he later founded the "Afternoon Theatre", and was director of many of its plays.
