= James Phelan =

James Phelan may refer to:

- James Phelan (American football) (1892–1974), American football player and coach
- James Phelan (literary scholar) (born 1951), American literary critic
- James Phelan Jr. (1856–1891), American politician, son of James Phelan, Sr.
- James Phelan Sr. (1821–1873), Confederate States of America politician
- James Phelan (novelist) (born 1979), Australian thriller writer
- James D. Phelan (1861–1930), American politician; Mayor of San Francisco and U.S. Senator from California
- Jim Phelan (basketball) (1929–2021), American college basketball coach
- Jim Phelan (Irish writer) (1899–1966), Irish tramp who wrote on tramp and prison life
- Jimmy Phelan (hurler) (1917–2006), Irish hurler
- SS James D. Phelan, a World War II Liberty ship
