= Whaling (disambiguation) =

Whaling is the hunting of whales.

"Whaling" may also refer to:

- Whaling, the use of email scams to target high-level executives and other corporate targets; see phishing
- "Whaling" (song), a 1983 song by New Zealand band DD Smash
- Bert Whaling (1888–1965), American baseball player
- William Whaling (1894–1989), American sport shooter
- Spending a large amount of money on free-to-play video games
