= Patrick Phelan =

Patrick Phelan may refer to:

- Paddy Phelan (1910–1971), Irish hurler
- Paddy Phelan (cricketer) (1938–2016), English cricketer
- Patrick Phelan (bishop of Kingston) (1795–1857), Canadian Roman Catholic priest, Sulpician, and bishop
- Patrick Phelan (bishop of Sale) (1856–1925), Irish-Australian Roman Catholic bishop
- Patrick Phelan (businessman) (1815–1898), Irish-Australian farmer, banker, and politician
- Patrick Phelan (physician), (born 1957) clinical professor of pediatrics, American
- Patrick Phelan (composer) (born 1970), video game audio manager and producer
- Pat Phelan (soccer) (born 1985), U.S. soccer player
- Pat Phelan (Coronation Street), a fictional antagonist and central antagonist

== See also ==
- Josho Pat Phelan, Soto Zen priest
