= Paul Phelan =

Irish hurler

Personal information
- Native name: Pól Ó Faoileáin (Irish)
- Nickname: Chunky
- Born: 27 June 1966 (age 60) Ballyhale, County Kilkenny, Ireland
- Occupation: County council employee
- Height: 5 ft 8 in (173 cm)

Sport
- Sport: Hurling
- Position: Left corner-back
Club
- Years: Club
- Ballyhale Shamrocks
Club titles
- Kilkenny titles: 4
- Leinster titles: 1
- All-Ireland Titles: 1
Inter-county*
| Years | County | Apps (scores) |
| 1989-1993 | Kilkenny | 2 (0-00) |
Inter-county titles
- Leinster titles: 0
- All-Irelands: 0
- NHL: 1
- All Stars: 0
- *Inter County team apps and scores correct as of 18:01, 10 January 2015.

Paul Phelan (born 27 June 1966) is an Irish former hurler who played as a left corner-back for the Kilkenny senior team.

Born in Ballyhale, County Kilkenny, Phelan first arrived on the inter-county scene at the age of seventeen when he first linked up with the Kilkenny minor team. He made his senior debut during the 1989-90 league. Phelan remained on the panel for a number of years and won one National Hurling League medal.

At club level Phelan is a one-time All-Ireland medallist with Ballyhale Shamrocks. In addition to this he has also won one Leinster medal and four championship medals.

Throughout his career Phelan made just 2 championship appearances. He retired from inter-county hurling following the conclusion of the 1993 championship.

== Honours ==
=== Player ===
Ballyhale Shamrocks

- All-Ireland Senior Club Hurling Championship (1): 1990
- Leinster Senior Club Hurling Championship (1): 1989
- Kilkenny Senior Club Hurling Championship (4): 1985, 1988, 1989, 1991

Kilkenny

- All-Ireland Senior Hurling Championship (2): 1992 (sub), 1993 (sub)
- Leinster Senior Hurling Championship (2): 1992 (sub), 1993 (sub)
- National Hurling League (1): 1989-90
- Leinster Minor Hurling Championship (1): 1984
