= Illinois's 5th congressional district =

U.S. House district for Illinois

Coordinates: 41°55′49″N 87°49′51″W

- Interactive map of district boundaries since January 3, 2023
- Representative: Mike Quigley; D–Chicago
- Area: 158.3 mi^{2} (410 km^{2})
- Distribution: 100.0% urban; 0.0% rural
- Population (2025): 750,306
- Median household income: $119,750
- Ethnicity: 71.3% White; 11.7% Hispanic; 10.7% Asian; 3.3% Two or more races; 2.4% Black; 0.5% other
- Cook PVI: D+19

The 5th congressional district of Illinois covers parts of Cook and Lake counties, as of the 2023 redistricting which followed the 2010 census. All or parts of Chicago, Inverness, Arlington Heights, Barrington Hills, Des Plaines, Palatine, Mount Prospect, Deer Park, Kildeer, Lake Zurich, Long Grove, and North Barrington are included. The district is the wealthiest district in the state of Illinois.

It has been represented by Democrat Mike Quigley since the April 2009 special election.

The district was created as part of the 28th United States Congress, which first met on March 4, 1843; it was initially represented by Stephen A. Douglas, whose Kansas–Nebraska Act prompted the creation of the Republican Party. Since the 1990s redistricting, it has covered most of Chicago's North Side; the 2010 redistricting extended it into DuPage County. It was represented by Democrat Rahm Emanuel from January 2003 until he resigned on January 2, 2009, to become White House Chief of Staff. On April 8, 2009, Mike Quigley won a special election to fill the seat.

The district has a Cook Partisan Voting Index score of D+19. The district and its predecessors have been in Democratic hands for all but four years since 1909. Two of those years came after Dan Rostenkowski lost his seat to Republican Michael Patrick Flanagan because of the Congressional Post Office scandal. On a national level, the scandal helped prompt the Republican Revolution of 1994. However, Flanagan was defeated after only one term by State Representative Rod Blagojevich in 1996, and no Republican has managed even 35 percent of the vote in the district since then. Blagojevich handed the seat to Emanuel in 2003.

== Composition ==
For the 118th and successive Congresses (based on redistricting following the 2020 census), the district contains all or portions of the following counties, townships, and municipalities:

Cook County (31)

Arlington Heights (part, also 8th and 9th), Barrington Hills (part, also 8th; shared with Kane, McHenry, and Lake counties), Barrington Hills (part, shared with Lake County), Barrington Township (part, also 8th), Buffalo Grove (part, also 9th and 10th; shared with Lake County), Chicago (part, also 1st, 2nd, 3rd, 4th, 6th, 7th, 8th, and 9th; shared with DuPage County), Des Plaines (part, also 3rd and 8th), Elk Grove Township (part, also 3rd and 8th), Glenview (part, also 8th and 9th), Harwood Heights, Hoffman Estates (part, also 8th), Inverness, Leyden Township (part, also 3rd and 4th), Maine Township (part, also 9th), Mount Prospect (part, also 8th), Niles (part, also 9th), Niles Township (part, also 9th), Norridge (part, also 8th), Northfield Township (part, also 9th), Norwood Park Township, Palatine (part, also 8th), Palatine Township (part, also 8th), Park Ridge (part, also 9th), Prospect Heights (part, also 9th), Rolling Meadows (part, also 8th), Rosemont (part, also 8th), Schaumburg (part, also 8th; shared with DuPage County), Schiller Park (part, also 3rd), Skokie (part, also 9th), South Barrington (part, also 8th), Wheeling Township (part, also 9th and 10th)

Lake County (13)

Barrington (part, shared with Cook County), Barrington Hills (part, also 8th; shared with Cook, Kane, and McHenry), Cuba Township (part, also 9th), Deer Park, Ela Township (part, also 9th), Fox River Grove (part, also 9th; shared with McHenry County), Hawthorn Woods (part, also 9th), Kildeer (part, also 9th), Lake Barrington (part, also 9th), Lake Zurich, Long Grove (part, also 9th), North Barrington (part, also 9th), Vernon Township (part, also 9th and 10th)

Chicago neighborhoods within the district include:

- Albany Park (part)
- Irving Park (part)
- Jefferson Park
- Lake View (part)
- Lincoln Park (part)
- Lincoln Square (part)
- North Mayfair
- North Park (part)
- Norwood Park (part)
- O'Hare (part)

== Recent election results from statewide races ==
Year	Office	Results
2008	President	Obama 66% - 33%
2012	President	Obama 62% - 38%
2016	President	Clinton 66% - 27%
2016	Senate	Duckworth 59% - 36%
2016	Comptroller (Spec.)	Mendoza 51% - 43%
2018	Governor	Pritzker 62% - 35%
2018	Attorney General	Raoul 63% - 35%
2018	Secretary of State	White 75% - 22%
2018	Comptroller	Mendoza 69% - 28%
2018	Treasurer	Frerichs 65% - 31%
2020	President	Biden 69% - 29%
2020	Senate	Durbin 65% - 29%
2022	Senate	Duckworth 70% - 29%
2022	Governor	Pritzker 70% - 28%
2022	Attorney General	Raoul 68% - 30%
2022	Secretary of State	Giannoulias 69% - 30%
2022	Comptroller	Mendoza 70% - 28%
2022	Treasurer	Frerichs 67% - 31%
2024	President	Harris 67% - 31%

== History ==
=== Prominent representatives ===
Representative	Notes
Stephen A. Douglas	Appointed the 7th Illinois Secretary of State (1840 – 1841); Elected an associate justice of the Illinois Supreme Court (1841 – 1843); Elected U.S. Senator from Illinois (1847 – 1861); Democratic nominee for the 1860 United States presidential election
William Alexander Richardson	Elected the 12th Speaker of the Illinois House of Representatives (1842 – 1844); Served as a captain and later major for the U.S. Army during the Mexican–American War; Democratic nominee for the 1856 Illinois gubernatorial election Appointed the 5th Governor of Nebraska Territory (1858); Elected U.S. Senator from Illinois (1863 – 1865)
Robert M. A. Hawk	Served as a first lieutenant, captain, and major for the Union Army during the American Civil War (1862 – 1865)
Robert R. Hitt	Chargé d'Affaires ad interim to Paris (1874 – 1881); Appointed the 13th United States Assistant Secretary of State (1881); Regent of the Smithsonian Institution (1893 – 1906)
Horatio C. Burchard	Appointed the 15th Director of the United States Mint (1879 – 1885)
Albert J. Hopkins	Elected U.S. Senator from Illinois (1903 – 1909)
Adolph J. Sabath	Served as 35th Dean of the United States House of Representatives (1934 – 1952)
Dan Rostenkowski	Served as U.S. House Majority Chief Deputy Whip (1977 – 1981)
Michael Patrick Flanagan	Served as a captain for the U.S. Army and fought in the Gulf War (1991 – 1992)
Rod Blagojevich	Elected the 40th Governor of Illinois (2003 – 2009)
Rahm Emanuel	Appointed White House Political Director under President Bill Clinton (1993); Appointed Senior Advisor to the President of the United States under President Bill Clinton (1993 – 1998); Appointed the 23rd White House Chief of Staff under President Barack Obama (2009 – 2010); Elected the 55th Mayor of Chicago (2011 – 2019)

== List of members representing the district ==
Member	Party	Years	Cong ress	Electoral history	District location
District created March 4, 1843
Stephen A. Douglas (Quincy)	Democratic	March 4, 1843 – March 3, 1847	28th 29th	Elected in 1842. Re-elected in 1844. Re-elected in 1846. Resigned when elected U.S. Senator.	
Vacant		March 3, 1847 – December 6, 1847	30th		
William A. Richardson (Quincy)	Democratic	December 6, 1847 – August 25, 1856	30th 31st 32nd 33rd 34th	Elected to finish Douglas's term. Re-elected in 1848. Re-elected in 1850. Re-elected in 1852. Re-elected in 1854. Resigned.	
Vacant		August 25, 1856 – November 4, 1856	34th		
Jacob C. Davis (Warsaw)	Democratic	November 4, 1856 – March 3, 1857	34th	Elected to finish Richardson's term. [data missing]	
Isaac N. Morris (Quincy)	Democratic	March 4, 1857 – March 3, 1861	35th 36th	Elected in 1856. Re-elected in 1858. [data missing]	
William A. Richardson (Quincy)	Democratic	March 4, 1861 – January 29, 1863	37th	Elected in 1860. Re-elected in 1862. Resigned when elected U.S. Senator.	
Vacant		January 29, 1863 – March 3, 1863	37th		
Owen Lovejoy (Princeton)	Republican	March 4, 1863 – March 25, 1864	38th	Redistricted from the 3rd district and re-elected in 1862. Died.	
Vacant		March 25, 1864 – May 20, 1864	38th		
Ebon C. Ingersoll (Peoria)	Republican	May 20, 1864 – March 3, 1871	38th 39th 40th 41st	Elected to finish Lovejoy's term. Re-elected in 1864. Re-elected in 1866. Re-elected in 1868. [data missing]	
Bradford N. Stevens (Tiskilwa)	Democratic	March 4, 1871 – March 3, 1873	42nd	Elected in 1870. [data missing]	
Horatio C. Burchard (Freeport)	Republican	March 4, 1873 – March 3, 1879	43rd 44th 45th	Redistricted from the 3rd district and re-elected in 1872. Re-elected in 1874. Re-elected in 1876. [data missing]	
Robert M.A. Hawk (Mount Carroll)	Republican	March 4, 1879 – June 29, 1882	46th 47th	Elected in 1878. Re-elected in 1880. Died.	
Vacant		June 29, 1882 – November 7, 1882	47th		
Robert R. Hitt (Mount Morris)	Republican	December 4, 1882 – March 3, 1883	47th	Elected to finish Hawk's term. Redistricted to the 6th district.	
Reuben Ellwood (Sycamore)	Republican	March 4, 1883 – July 1, 1885	48th 49th	Elected in 1882. Re-elected in 1884. Died.	
Vacant		July 1, 1885 – December 7, 1885	49th		
Albert J. Hopkins (Aurora)	Republican	December 7, 1885 – March 3, 1895	49th 50th 51st 52nd 53rd	Elected to finish Ellwood's term. Re-elected in 1886. Re-elected in 1888. Re-elected in 1890. Re-elected in 1892. Redistricted to the 8th district.	
George E. White (Chicago)	Republican	March 4, 1895 – March 3, 1899	54th 55th	Elected in 1894. Re-elected in 1896. Lost re-election.	
Edward T. Noonan (Chicago)	Democratic	March 4, 1899 – March 3, 1901	56th	Elected in 1898. Retired.	
William F. Mahoney (Chicago)	Democratic	March 4, 1901 – March 3, 1903	57th	Elected in 1900. Redistricted to the 8th district.	
James McAndrews (Chicago)	Democratic	March 4, 1903 – March 3, 1905	58th	Redistricted from the 4th district and re-elected in 1902. Retired.	
Anthony Michalek (Chicago)	Republican	March 4, 1905 – March 3, 1907	59th	Elected in 1904. Lost re-election.	
Adolph J. Sabath (Chicago)	Democratic	March 4, 1907 – January 3, 1949	60th 61st 62nd 63rd 64th 65th 66th 67th 68th 69th 70th 71st 72nd 73rd 74th 75th 76th 77th 78th 79th 80th	Elected in 1906. Re-elected in 1908. Re-elected in 1910. Re-elected in 1912. Re-elected in 1914. Re-elected in 1916. Re-elected in 1918. Re-elected in 1920. Re-elected in 1922. Re-elected in 1924. Re-elected in 1926. Re-elected in 1928. Re-elected in 1930. Re-elected in 1932. Re-elected in 1934. Re-elected in 1936. Re-elected in 1938. Re-elected in 1940. Re-elected in 1942. Re-elected in 1944. Re-elected in 1946. Redistricted to the 7th district.	
Martin Gorski (Chicago)	Democratic	January 3, 1949 – December 4, 1949	81st	Redistricted from the 4th district and re-elected in 1948. Died.	
Vacant		December 4, 1949 – January 3, 1951	81st		
John C. Kluczynski (Chicago)	Democratic	January 3, 1951 – January 26, 1975	82nd 83rd 84th 85th 86th 87th 88th 89th 90th 91st 92nd 93rd 94th	Elected in 1950. Re-elected in 1952. Re-elected in 1954. Re-elected in 1956. Re-elected in 1958. Re-elected in 1960. Re-elected in 1962. Re-elected in 1964. Re-elected in 1966. Re-elected in 1968. Re-elected in 1970. Re-elected in 1972. Re-elected in 1974. Died.	
Vacant		January 26, 1975 – July 8, 1975	94th		
John G. Fary (Chicago)	Democratic	July 8, 1975 – January 3, 1983	94th 95th 96th 97th	Elected to finish Kluczynski's term. Re-elected in 1976. Re-elected in 1978. Re-elected in 1980. Lost renomination.	
Bill Lipinski (Chicago)	Democratic	January 3, 1983 – January 3, 1993	98th 99th 100th 101st 102nd	Elected in 1982. Re-elected in 1984. Re-elected in 1986. Re-elected in 1988. Re-elected in 1990. Redistricted to the 3rd district.	
Dan Rostenkowski (Chicago)	Democratic	January 3, 1993 – January 3, 1995	103rd	Redistricted from the 8th district and re-elected in 1992. Lost re-election.	
Michael P. Flanagan (Chicago)	Republican	January 3, 1995 – January 3, 1997	104th	Elected in 1994. Lost re-election.	
Rod Blagojevich (Chicago)	Democratic	January 3, 1997 – January 3, 2003	105th 106th 107th	Elected in 1996. Re-elected in 1998. Re-elected in 2000. Retired to run for Governor of Illinois.	
Rahm Emanuel (Chicago)	Democratic	January 3, 2003 – January 2, 2009	108th 109th 110th	Elected in 2002. Re-elected in 2004. Re-elected in 2006. Re-elected in 2008, but resigned to become White House Chief of Staff.	2003–2013
Vacant		January 2, 2009 – April 7, 2009	110th 111th		2003–2013
Mike Quigley (Chicago)	Democratic	April 7, 2009 – present	111th 112th 113th 114th 115th 116th 117th 118th 119th	Elected to finish Emanuel's term. Re-elected in 2010. Re-elected in 2012. Re-elected in 2014. Re-elected in 2016. Re-elected in 2018. Re-elected in 2020. Re-elected in 2022. Re-elected in 2024. Re-elected in 2026.	2003–2013
Mike Quigley (Chicago)	Democratic	April 7, 2009 – present	111th 112th 113th 114th 115th 116th 117th 118th 119th	Elected to finish Emanuel's term. Re-elected in 2010. Re-elected in 2012. Re-elected in 2014. Re-elected in 2016. Re-elected in 2018. Re-elected in 2020. Re-elected in 2022. Re-elected in 2024. Re-elected in 2026.	2013–2023
Mike Quigley (Chicago)	Democratic	April 7, 2009 – present	111th 112th 113th 114th 115th 116th 117th 118th 119th	Elected to finish Emanuel's term. Re-elected in 2010. Re-elected in 2012. Re-elected in 2014. Re-elected in 2016. Re-elected in 2018. Re-elected in 2020. Re-elected in 2022. Re-elected in 2024. Re-elected in 2026.	2023–present

== Election results ==
=== 2012 ===
Illinois's 5th congressional district, 2012
Party	Candidate	Votes	%
Democratic	Mike Quigley (incumbent)	177,729	65.7
Republican	Dan Schmitt	77,289	28.6
Green	Nancy Wade	15,359	5.7
Total votes		270,377	100.0
Democratic hold			

=== 2014 ===
Illinois's 5th congressional district, 2014
Party	Candidate	Votes	%
Democratic	Mike Quigley (incumbent)	116,364	63.3
Republican	Vince Kolber	56,350	30.6
Green	Nancy Wade	11,305	6.1
Total votes		184,019	100.0
Democratic hold			

=== 2016 ===
Illinois's 5th congressional district, 2016
Party	Candidate	Votes	%
Democratic	Mike Quigley (incumbent)	212,842	67.8
Republican	Vince Kolber	86,222	27.5
Green	Rob Sherman	14,657	4.7
Independent	Michael Krynski (write-in)	3	0.0
Total votes		313,724	100.0
Democratic hold			

=== 2018 ===
Illinois's 5th congressional district, 2018
Party	Candidate	Votes	%
Democratic	Mike Quigley (incumbent)	213,992	76.7
Republican	Tom Hanson	65,134	23.3
Independent	Frank Rowder (write-in)	5	0.0
Total votes		279,131	100.0
Democratic hold			

=== 2020 ===
Illinois's 5th congressional district, 2020
Party	Candidate	Votes	%	±%
Democratic	Mike Quigley (incumbent)	255,661	70.77	−5.89%
Republican	Tom Hanson	96,200	26.63	+3.30%
Green	Thomas J. Wilda	9,408	2.60	N/A
Write-in		2	0.00	N/A
Total votes		361,271	100.0	
Democratic hold				

=== 2022 ===
Illinois's 5th congressional district, 2022
Party	Candidate	Votes	%
Democratic	Mike Quigley (incumbent)	190,999	69.57
Republican	Tommy Hanson	79,112	28.81
Independent	Jerico Matias Cruz	4,439	1.62
Total votes		274,550	100.0
Democratic hold			

=== 2024 ===
Illinois's 5th congressional district, 2024
Party	Candidate	Votes	%	±%
Democratic	Mike Quigley (incumbent)	251,025	68.97	−0.60%
Republican	Tommy Hanson	112,931	31.03	+2.22%
Write-in		9	0.00	N/A
Total votes		363,965	100.0	
Democratic hold				

== See also ==
- Illinois's congressional delegations
- Illinois's congressional districts
- List of United States congressional districts
- Political history of Chicago
