= Naked Economics =

Book by Charles Wheelan

Naked Economics: Undressing the Dismal Science
- Author: Charles Wheelan
- Language: English
- Subject: Economics
- Publisher: W. W. Norton & Company
- Publication date: September 15, 2002 (1st edition)
- Publication place: United States of America
- Media type: Print (Hardback, Paperback)
- Pages: 260
- ISBN: 0-393-04982-5
- OCLC: 49351809
- Dewey Decimal: 330 21
- LC Class: HB171 .W54 2002

Naked Economics: Undressing the Dismal Science is a book by Charles Wheelan that seeks to translate basic economic issues into a format that can be easily read by people with little or no previous knowledge of economics. The Chicago Tribune described the book as "Translat[ing] the arcane and often inscrutable jargon of the professional economist into language accessible to the inquiring but frustrated layman." A fully revised and updated version of the book with a foreword by Burton Malkiel was published in 2010.

It has been translated into eleven languages.
