= Whalen =

Whalen is a surname. In Ireland, Whalen, Whelan, Phelan and O'Phelan, are anglicized variants of the same Gaelic surname, Faoláin, which itself is a variant of Ó Faoileáin and Ó Haoláin.

It may refer to:

== People ==
- Bob Whalen, American college baseball coach
- Bruce Whalen, American politician
- Charles W. Whalen, Jr., American politician
- Diana Whalen, Canadian politician
- Dianne Whalen, Canadian politician
- Douglas Whalen, American linguist
- Ed Whalen (broadcaster), Canadian television personality
- Grover Whalen, American politician and businessman
- Jack Whalen, American hitman
- James Henry Whalen, Canadian pilot
- James J. Whalen, American psychologist
- Jennifer Whalen, American mountain bike racer
- Jennifer R Whalen, Canadian actor and comedian
- Jill Whalen, American search engine optimization consultant
- Jim Whalen, American football player
- Joe Whalen, American tennis player
- John S. Whalen, American politician
- Laurence Whalen, American judge
- Lindsay Whalen, American basketball player
- Megan Whalen Turner, American author
- Michael James Whalen, American composer
- Philip Whalen, American poet
- Rob Whalen, American baseball player
- Sara Whalen (born 1976), American soccer player
- Sean Whalen (born 1964), American actor and writer
- Thomas Michael Whalen III, American politician
- Thomas Whalen, Scottish sculptor
- Vermel Whalen, American politician

== Fictional characters ==
- Patrick Whalen, A character in The Sopranos
- William Whalen, also known as Billy Quizboy, a character on The Venture Bros.

== Places ==
In Britain, Whalen is an old English-language spelling for the village Uelen.

== Songs ==
- Jimmy Whalen, a song by Peter, Paul and Mary from A Song Will Rise

== See also ==
- Whalan
- Uelen
