= Charles Wheelan =

American professor and writer

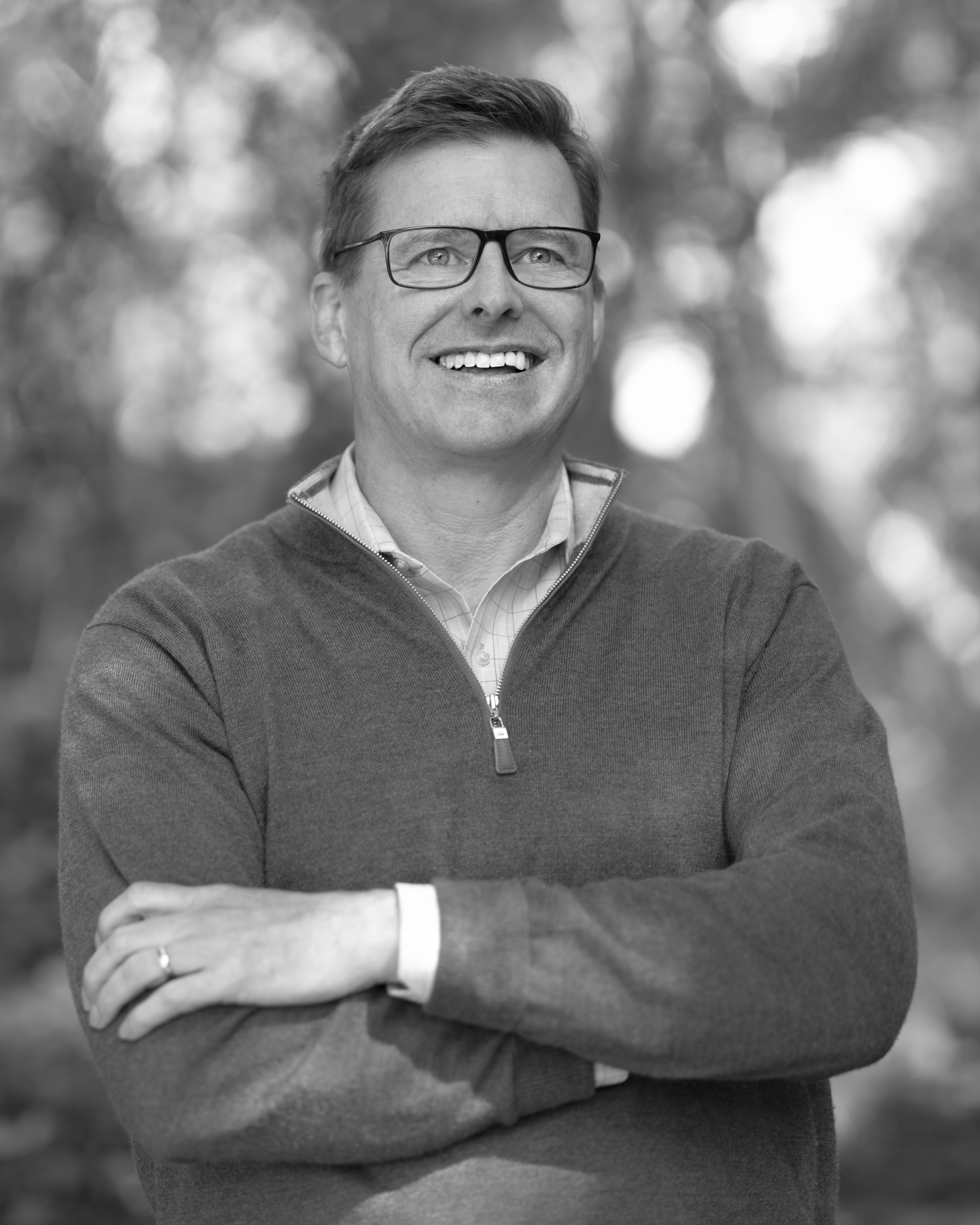
- Born: 1966 (age 59–60)
- Education: Dartmouth College (BA); Princeton University (MPA); University of Chicago (PhD)
- Occupation: Author
- Spouse: Leah Wheelan
- Children: 3

Charles J. Wheelan (born 1966) is an American professor, journalist, speaker, and is the founder and co-chairman of Unite America. Wheelan is the author of Naked Statistics, Naked Economics, and Naked Money. He was an unsuccessful Democratic candidate in the special election for Illinois's 5th congressional district, the seat vacated by Rahm Emanuel.

== Journalist and author ==
Wheelan graduated from Dartmouth College in 1988; he was a member of Alpha Delta fraternity. From 1997 to 2002, he was the Midwest correspondent for The Economist. He has also written for the Chicago Tribune, The New York Times, The Wall Street Journal and Yahoo! Finance.

Charles Wheelan is a senior lecturer and policy fellow at the Rockefeller Center at Dartmouth College.

Wheelan is a regular contributor to the Motley Fool Radio Show on National Public Radio and to the Eight Forty-Eight program on WBEZ, Chicago Public Radio.

Wheelan's first book, Naked Economics (2002), is an introduction to economics for lay readers; Naked Statistics (2013) is an introduction to statistics. The Centrist Manifesto (2013) attempts to articulate a centrism that is more than a set of compromises between the political extremes, a perspective Wheelan elsewhere characterizes as radical centrist.

== Works ==
Books

- Naked Economics: Undressing the Dismal Science, W.W. Norton, 2002. ISBN 978-0-393-33764-8
- Revealing Chicago: An Aerial Portrait, Harry N. Abrams, Inc., 2005. ISBN 0-8109-5874-0
- Introduction to Public Policy, W.W. Norton, 2010. ISBN 978-0-393-92665-1
- 10 1/2 Things No Commencement Speaker Has Ever Said, W. W. Norton, 2012. ISBN 978-0-393-07431-4
- The Centrist Manifesto, W.W. Norton, 2013. ISBN 978-0-393-34687-9
- Naked Statistics: Stripping the Dread from the Data, W.W. Norton, 2013. ISBN 978-0-393-07195-5
- Naked Money: A Revealing Look at What It Is and Why It Matters, W.W. Norton, 2016. ISBN 978-0-393-06902-0
