= 2018 United States House of Representatives elections in Illinois =

- November 6, 2018

All 18 Illinois seats to the United States House of Representatives
	Majority party	Minority party
Party	Democratic	Republican
Last election	11	7
Seats won	13	5
Seat change	▲2	▼2
Popular vote	2,744,727	1,754,449
Percentage	60.46%	38.65%
Swing	▲6.84%	▼7.09%

Democratic hold Democratic gain
Republican hold
Democratic
40–50%
50–60%
60–70%
70–80%
80–90%
Republican
50–60%
60–70%
70–80%
80–90%

The 2018 United States House of Representatives elections in Illinois were held on November 6, 2018, to elect U.S. representatives, one from each of the state's eighteen congressional districts.

The primaries for all parties were held on March 20, 2018. The state congressional delegation changed from an 11–7 Democratic majority to a 13–5 Democratic majority.

== Overview ==
=== Statewide ===
Popular vote
Democratic	60.46%
Republican	38.65%
Other	0.89%

House seats
Democratic	72.22%
Republican	27.78%

=== By district ===
Results of the 2018 United States House of Representatives elections in Illinois by district:

District	Democratic		Republican		Others		Total		Result
District	Votes	%	Votes	%	Votes	%	Votes	%	Result
District 1	189,560	73.51%	50,960	19.76%	17,365	6.73%	257,885	100.0%	Democratic hold
District 2	190,684	81.06%	44,567	18.94%	0	0.00%	235,251	100.0%	Democratic hold
District 3	163,053	73.01%	57,885	25.92%	2,396	1.07%	223,334	100.0%	Democratic hold
District 4	143,895	86.59%	22,294	13.41%	0	0.00%	166,189	100.0%	Democratic hold
District 5	213,992	76.66%	65,134	23.34%	5	0.00%	279,131	100.0%	Democratic hold
District 6	169,001	53.58%	146,445	46.42%	0	0.00%	315,446	100.0%	Democratic gain
District 7	215,746	87.62%	30,497	12.38%	0	0.00%	246,243	100.0%	Democratic hold
District 8	130,054	65.97%	67,073	34.03%	0	0.00%	197,127	100.0%	Democratic hold
District 9	213,368	73.49%	76,983	26.51%	0	0.00%	290,351	100.0%	Democratic hold
District 10	156,540	65.59%	82,124	34.41%	0	0.00%	238,664	100.0%	Democratic hold
District 11	145,407	63.84%	82,358	36.16%	0	0.00%	227,765	100.0%	Democratic hold
District 12	118,724	45.39%	134,884	51.57%	7,935	3.03%	261,543	100.0%	Republican hold
District 13	134,458	49.62%	136,516	50.38%	7	0.00%	270,981	100.0%	Republican hold
District 14	156,035	52.50%	141,164	47.50%	0	0.00%	297,199	100.0%	Democratic gain
District 15	74,309	29.07%	181,294	70.93%	5	0.00%	255,608	100.0%	Republican hold
District 16	104,569	40.88%	151,254	59.12%	2	0.00%	255,825	100.0%	Republican hold
District 17	142,659	62.09%	87,090	37.91%	0	0.00%	229,749	100.0%	Democratic hold
District 18	95,486	32.77%	195,927	67.23%	0	0.00%	291,413	100.0%	Republican hold
Total	2,757,540	60.74%	1,754,449	38.65%	27,715	0.61%	4,539,704	100.0%	

== District 1 ==
2018 Illinois's 1st congressional district election
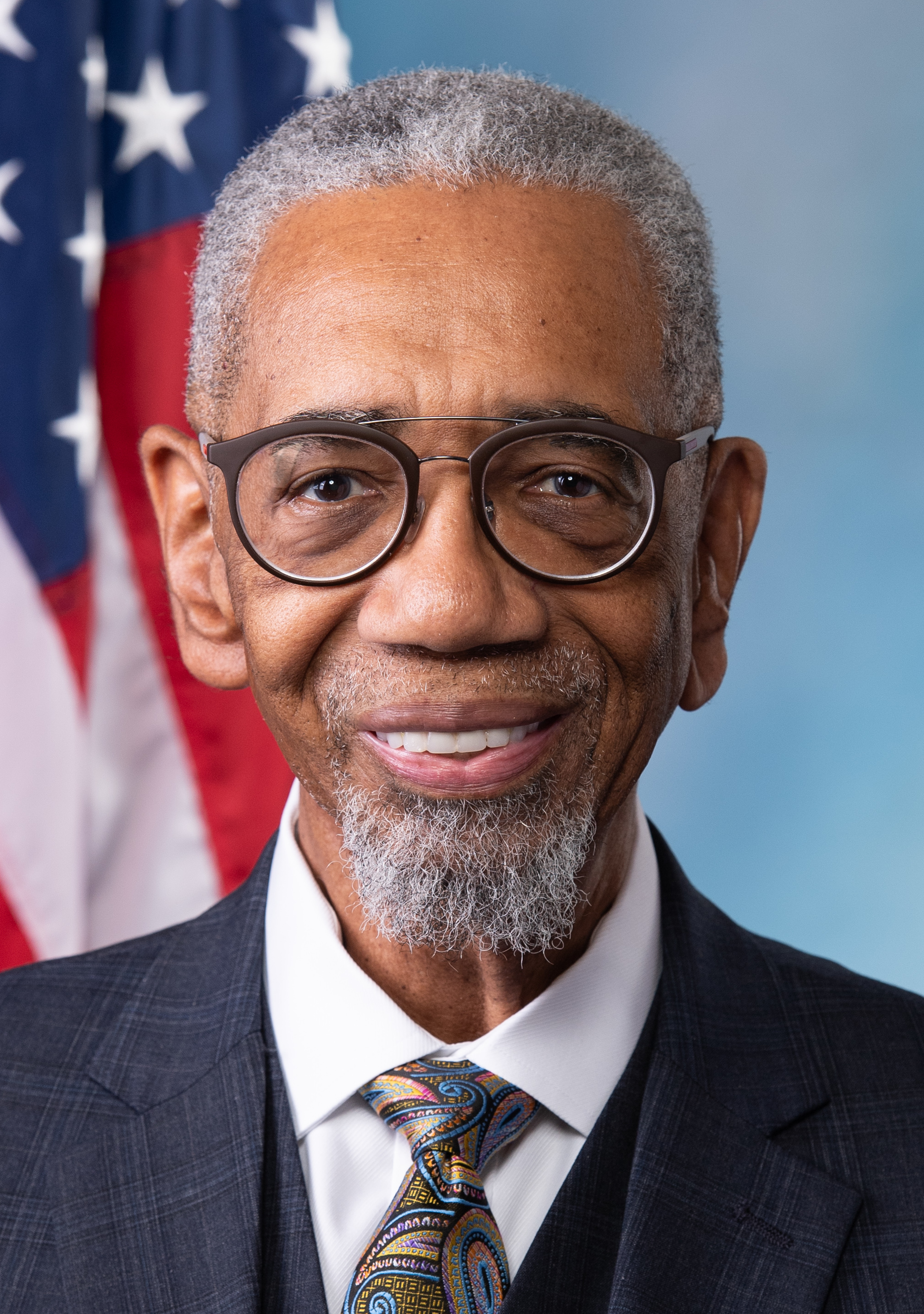

Nominee	Bobby Rush	Jimmy Lee Tillman	Thomas Rudbeck
Party	Democratic	Republican	Independent
Popular vote	189,560	50,960	17,365
Percentage	73.5%	19.8%	6.7%
- County results Rush: 80–90% Tillman: 50–60%
U.S. Representative before election
Bobby Rush
Democratic
Elected U.S. Representative
Bobby Rush
Democratic

Incumbent Democrat Bobby Rush, who had represented the district since 1993, ran for re-election. He was re-elected with 74.1% of the vote in 2016. The district had a PVI of D+27.

=== Democratic primary ===
==== Candidates ====
===== Nominee =====
- Bobby Rush, incumbent U.S. representative

===== Withdrew =====
- Howard Brookins, Chicago alderman for the 21st Ward and candidate for this seat in 2016

==== Primary results ====
Democratic primary results
Party	Candidate	Votes	%
Democratic	Bobby Rush (incumbent)	104,114	100.0
Total votes		104,114	100.0

=== Republican primary ===
==== Candidates ====
===== Nominee =====
- Jimmy Lee Tillman, II, son of former Chicago Alderman Dorothy Tillman, nominee for this seat in 2014 and candidate in 2016

==== Primary results ====
Republican primary results
Party	Candidate	Votes	%
Republican	Jimmy Lee Tillman, II	15,389	100.0
Total votes		15,389	100.0

=== General election ===
==== Predictions ====
Source	Ranking	As of
The Cook Political Report	Safe D	November 5, 2018
Inside Elections	Safe D	November 5, 2018
Sabato's Crystal Ball	Safe D	November 5, 2018
RCP	Safe D	November 5, 2018
Daily Kos	Safe D	November 5, 2018
538	Safe D	November 7, 2018
CNN	Safe D	October 31, 2018
Politico	Safe D	November 2, 2018

==== Results ====
Illinois's 1st congressional district, 2018
Party	Candidate	Votes	%
Democratic	Bobby Rush (incumbent)	189,560	73.5
Republican	Jimmy Lee Tillman, II	50,960	19.8
Independent	Thomas Rudbeck	17,365	6.7
Total votes		257,885	100.0
Democratic hold			

== District 2 ==
2018 Illinois's 2nd congressional district election
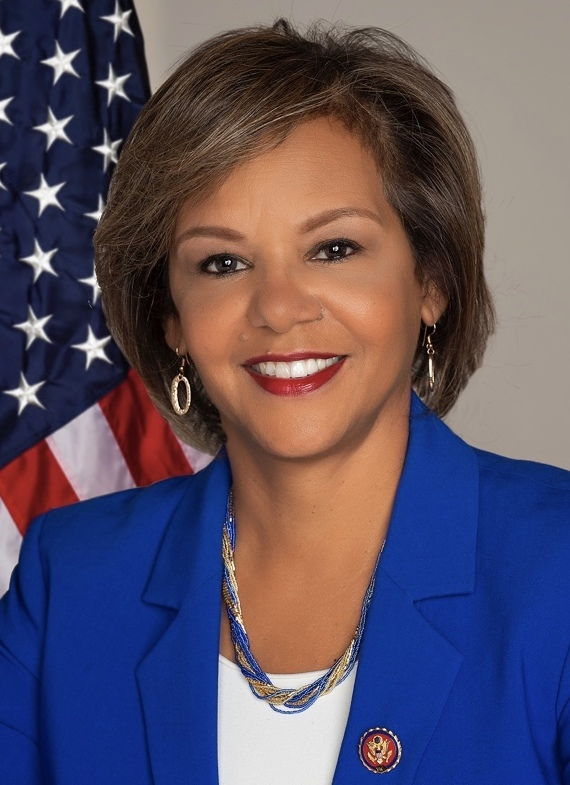

Nominee	Robin Kelly	David Merkle
Party	Democratic	Republican
Popular vote	190,684	44,567
Percentage	81.1%	18.9%
- County results Kelly: 50–60% >90% Merkle: 50–60%
U.S. Representative before election
Robin Kelly
Democratic
Elected U.S. Representative
Robin Kelly
Democratic

Incumbent Democrat Robin Kelly, who had represented the district since 2013, ran for re-election. She was re-elected with 79.8% of the vote in 2016. The district had a PVI of D+29.

=== Democratic primary ===
==== Candidates ====
===== Nominee =====
- Robin Kelly, incumbent U.S. representative

===== Eliminated in primary =====
- Marcus Lewis, postal worker, independent candidate for this seat in 2012 & 2013, and Democratic candidate in 2014 & 2016

==== Primary results ====
Democratic primary results
Party	Candidate	Votes	%
Democratic	Robin Kelly (incumbent)	80,659	82.1
Democratic	Marcus Lewis	17,640	17.9
Total votes		98,299	100.0

=== Republican primary ===
==== Candidates ====
===== Nominee =====
- David Merkle

===== Eliminated in primary =====
- Patrick Harmon
- John Morrow, nominee for this seat in 2016

==== Primary results ====
Results by county: Merkle—40–50% Harmon—40–50% Harmon—30–40%

Republican primary results
Party	Candidate	Votes	%
Republican	David Merkle	4,963	36.6
Republican	Patrick Harmon	4,810	35.5
Republican	John Morrow	3,790	27.9
Total votes		13,563	100.0

=== General election ===
==== Predictions ====
Source	Ranking	As of
The Cook Political Report	Safe D	November 5, 2018
Inside Elections	Safe D	November 5, 2018
Sabato's Crystal Ball	Safe D	November 5, 2018
RCP	Safe D	November 5, 2018
Daily Kos	Safe D	November 5, 2018
538	Safe D	November 7, 2018
CNN	Safe D	October 31, 2018
Politico	Safe D	November 4, 2018

==== Results ====
Illinois's 2nd congressional district, 2018
Party	Candidate	Votes	%
Democratic	Robin Kelly (incumbent)	190,684	81.1
Republican	David Merkle	44,567	18.9
Total votes		235,251	100.0
Democratic hold			

== District 3 ==
2018 Illinois's 3rd congressional district election
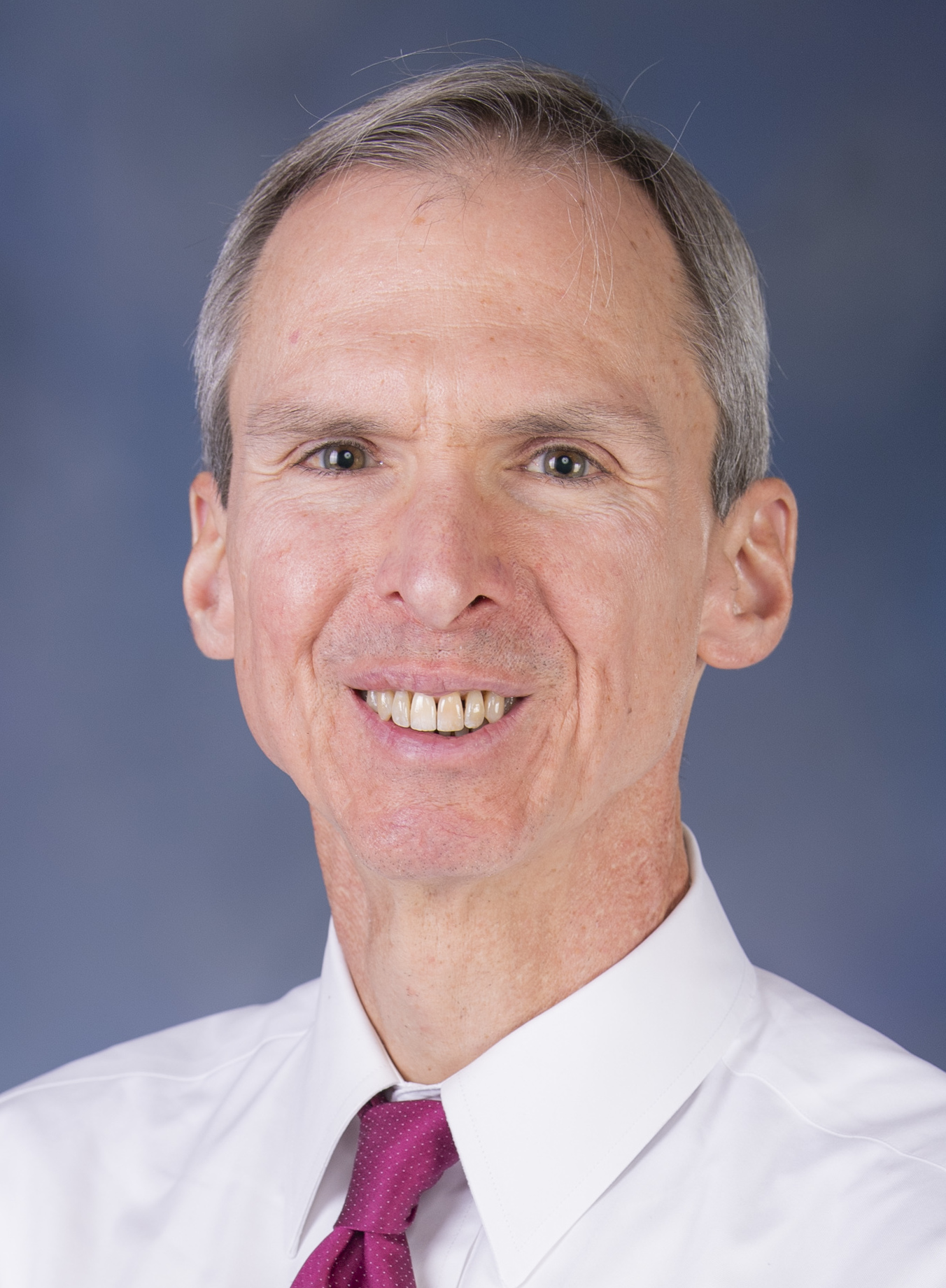

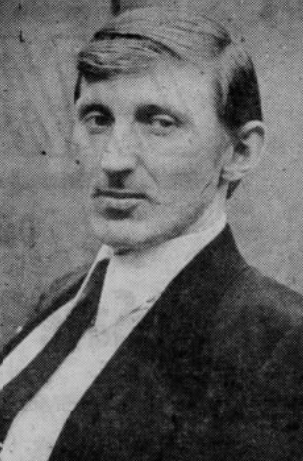
Nominee	Dan Lipinski	Arthur Jones
Party	Democratic	Republican
Popular vote	163,053	57,885
Percentage	73.0%	25.9%
- County results Lipinski: 60–70% 70–80%
U.S. Representative before election
Dan Lipinski
Democratic
Elected U.S. Representative
Dan Lipinski
Democratic

Incumbent Democrat Dan Lipinski, who had represented the district since 2005, ran for re-election. He was re-elected with 100.0% of the vote in 2016. The district had a PVI of D+6.

=== Democratic primary ===
==== Candidates ====
===== Nominee =====
- Dan Lipinski, incumbent U.S. representative

===== Eliminated in primary =====
- Marie Newman, businesswoman and activist

==== Endorsements ====
Dan Lipinski

U.S. senators

- Ted Cruz, U.S. senator from Texas (Republican)

State legislators

- Steven Landek, state senator

Labor unions

- International Association of Fire Fighters
- International Association of Machinists and Aerospace Workers
- International Association of Sheet Metal, Air, Rail and Transportation Workers
- International Brotherhood of Boilermakers
- Transport Workers Union of America
- United Steelworkers

Organizations

- Susan B. Anthony List

Newspapers

- Chicago Sun-Times
- Chicago Tribune

Local officials

- Jeff Tobolski, member of the Cook County Board of Commissioners from the 16th district
Marie Newman

U.S. senators

- Kirsten Gillibrand, United States senator from New York
- Bernie Sanders, Independent United States senator from Vermont, 2016 presidential candidate

U.S. representatives

- Raúl Grijalva, representative from Arizona's 3rd congressional district
- Luis Gutiérrez, representative from Illinois's 4th congressional district
- Pramila Jayapal, representative from Washington's 7th congressional district
- Ro Khanna, representative from California's 17th congressional district
- Mark Pocan, representative from Wisconsin's 2nd congressional district
- Jan Schakowsky, representative from Illinois's 9th congressional district

State legislators

- Laura Fine (D-Glenview), representative
- Toi Hutchinson (D-Olympia Fields), state senator
- Theresa Mah (D-Chicago), representative
- Ann Williams (D-Chicago), representative

Labor unions

- American Postal Workers Union local #6266
- Illinois Federation of Teachers
- National Nurses United
- Service Employees International Union of Illinois

Organizations

- Citizen Action/Illinois
- Daily Kos
- Democracy for America
- EMILY's List
- Feminist Majority
- Human Rights Campaign
- Indivisible Brookfield
- Indivisible Chicago – South Side
- Indivisible LG/LGP
- Indivisible Western Springs
- J Street PAC
- Justice Democrats
- LPAC
- MoveOn.org
- NARAL Pro-Choice America
- National Association of Social Workers
- National Organization for Women
- National Women's Political Caucus
- Northside Democracy for America
- Our Revolution
- Our Revolution Illinois
- Planned Parenthood Action Fund
- Progressive Change Campaign Committee

Local officials

- Ameya Pawar, Chicago alderman for the 47th ward, former gubernatorial candidate
- Toni Preckwinkle, president of the Cook County Board

Individuals

- Gloria Steinem, feminist activist

==== Polling ====
Poll source	Date(s) administered	Sample size	Margin of error	Dan Lipinski	Marie Newman	Undecided
Public Policy Polling (D)	February 27–28, 2018	648	± 3.9%	43%	41%	15%
Normington, Petts & Associates (D)	October 16–19, 2017	400	± 4.9%	49%	18%	33%

==== Primary results ====
Results by county Lipinski: 50–60% Newman: 50–60% 60–70%

Democratic primary results
Party	Candidate	Votes	%
Democratic	Dan Lipinski (incumbent)	48,675	51.1
Democratic	Marie Newman	46,530	48.9
Total votes		95,205	100.0

=== Republican primary ===
Jewish Republicans called for Cook County Republican chairman Sean Morrison to resign for failing to recruit any candidate to oppose Art Jones, a self-professed Nazi, Holocaust denier, white nationalist, and white supremacist who became the Republican nominee.

==== Candidates ====
===== Nominee =====
- Arthur Jones, former chair of the American Nazi Party, Holocaust denier, and white supremacist

==== Primary results ====
Republican primary results
Party	Candidate	Votes	%
Republican	Arthur Jones	20,681	100.0
Total votes		20,681	100.0

=== Other candidates ===
==== Write-in ====
===== Declared =====
- Justin Hanson, lawyer and Republican former congressional staffer
- Richard Mayers, perennial candidate and alleged white supremacist congressional candidate in 2000, 2002, 2008, and 2016; 1998 State House candidate; 1993 Berwyn city clerk and city treasurer candidate
- Kenneth Yerkes, dentist

===== Declined =====
- Christopher Reilly, Palos Township trustee

=== General election ===
==== Predictions ====
Source	Ranking	As of
The Cook Political Report	Safe D	November 5, 2018
Inside Elections	Safe D	November 5, 2018
Sabato's Crystal Ball	Safe D	November 5, 2018
RCP	Safe D	November 5, 2018
Daily Kos	Safe D	November 5, 2018
538	Safe D	November 7, 2018
CNN	Safe D	October 31, 2018
Politico	Safe D	November 4, 2018

==== Results ====
Illinois's 3rd congressional district, 2018
Party	Candidate	Votes	%
Democratic	Dan Lipinski (incumbent)	163,053	73.0
Republican	Arthur Jones	57,885	25.9
Independent	Justin Hanson (write-in)	1,353	0.6
Independent	Kenneth Yerkes (write-in)	1,039	0.5
Independent	Richard Mayers (write-in)	4	0.0
Total votes		223,334	100.0
Democratic hold			

== District 4 ==
2018 Illinois's 4th congressional district election
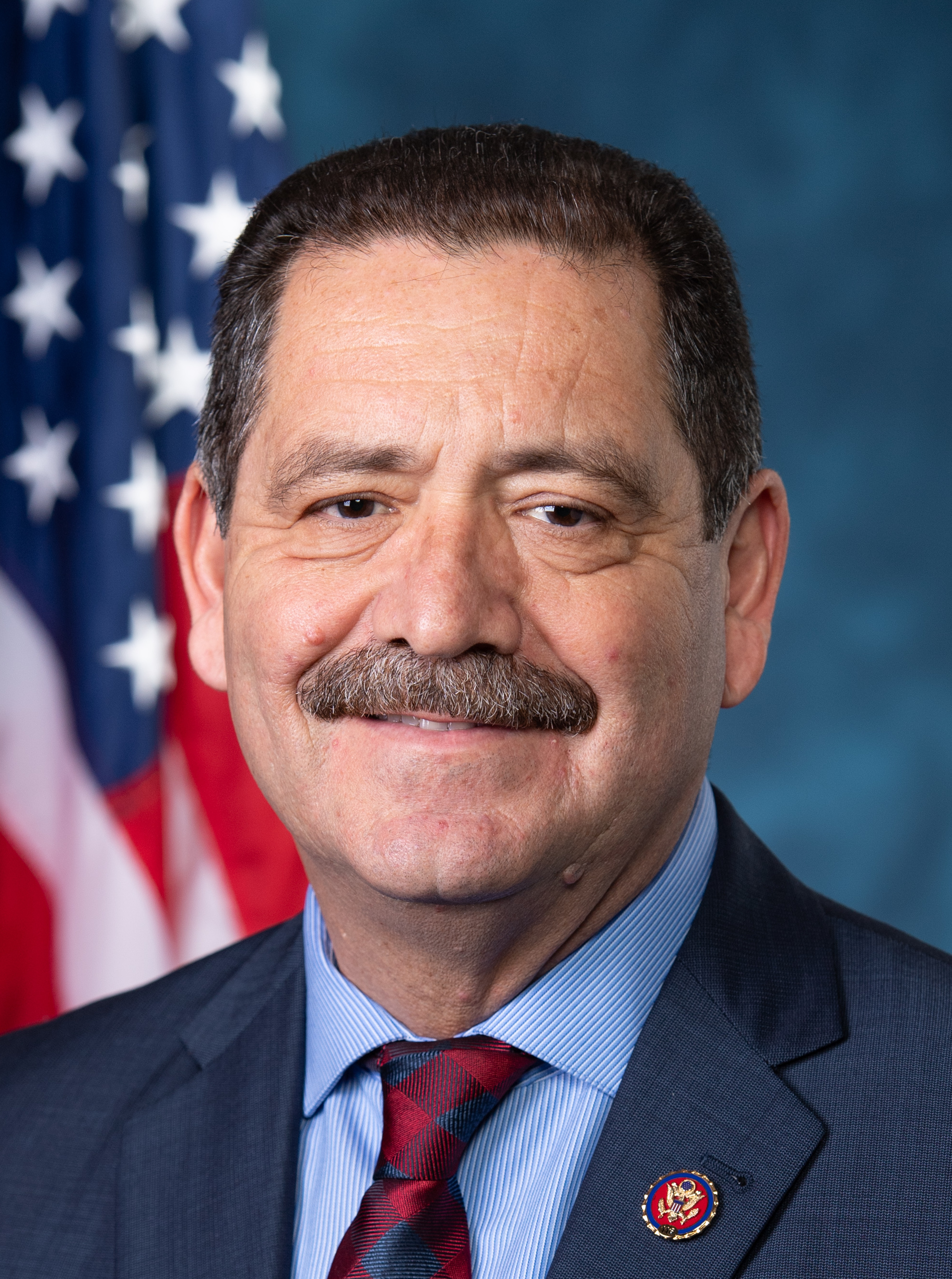

Nominee	Chuy García	Mark Lorch
Party	Democratic	Republican
Popular vote	143,895	22,294
Percentage	86.6%	13.4%
- County results Garcia: 80–90%
U.S. Representative before election
Luis Gutiérrez
Democratic
Elected U.S. Representative
Chuy García
Democratic

Incumbent Democrat Luis Gutiérrez, who had represented the district since 1993, ran for re-election. He was re-elected with 79.8% of the vote in 2016. The district had a PVI of D+33.

=== Democratic primary ===
A day after filing petitions to run for reelection, Gutierrez announced he would not seek re-election in 2018 and would retire at the end of his current term.

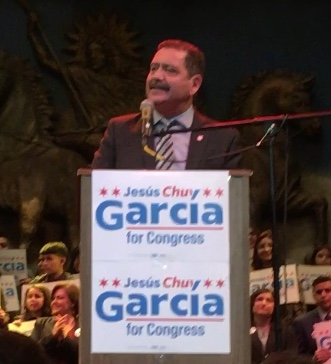
Jesús "Chuy" García at a congressional campaign rally in South Lawndale, Chicago, February 2018

Gutierrez's announcement led multiple Democrats to begin circulating petitions. Jesús "Chuy" García, a member of the Cook County Board of Commissioners, Carlos Ramirez-Rosa, and Proco Joe Moreno, both members of the Chicago City Council, circulated petitions for the nomination. Ramirez-Rosa and Moreno withdrew. Gutiérrez endorsed García.

On November 28, 2017, Richard Gonzalez filed to run for the Democratic nomination.

==== Candidates ====
===== Nominee =====
- Jesús "Chuy" García, Cook County commissioner for the 7th district

===== Eliminated in primary =====
- Sol Flores, founding executive director of La Casa Norte
- Richard Gonzalez, Chicago Police Department sergeant

===== Withdrew =====
- Raymond Lopez, Chicago city councilman for the 15th ward
- Proco Joe Moreno, Chicago city councilman for the 1st ward
- Carlos Ramirez-Rosa, Chicago city councilman for the 35th ward (endorsed Jesús "Chuy" García)

==== Endorsements ====
Sol Flores

U.S. senators

- Kirsten Gillibrand, U.S. senator from New York

Organizations

- EMILY's List

Newspapers

- Chicago Tribune

Local officials

- Ameya Pawar, Chicago alderman
Jesús "Chuy" García

U.S. senators

- Bernie Sanders, U.S. senator from Vermont and 2016 presidential candidate

U.S. representatives

- Luis Gutiérrez, retiring U.S. representative (IL-4)

State legislators

- Nina Turner, former member of the Ohio Senate and president of Our Revolution

Organizations

- Our Revolution

Newspapers

- Chicago Sun-Times

Local officials

- Carlos Ramirez-Rosa, member of the Chicago City Council from the 35th ward and former U.S. representative (IL-4) candidate

Individuals

- Christopher G. Kennedy, businessman and 2018 Illinois gubernatorial candidate
- J. B. Pritzker, businessman and 2018 Democratic Illinois gubernatorial nominee

==== Polling ====
Poll source	Date(s) administered	Sample size	Margin of error	Jesus "Chuy" García	Joe Moreno	Sol Flores	Carlos Ramirez-Rosa	Other	Undecided
Garin Hart Yang Research Group (D)	January 18–21, 2018	400	± 5.0%	59%	8%	6%	–	8%	19%
Public Policy Polling (D)	December 13–14, 2017	412	± 4.8%	53%	–	–	7%	–	20%

==== Primary results ====
Democratic primary results
Party	Candidate	Votes	%
Democratic	Jesús "Chuy" García	49,631	66.4
Democratic	Sol Flores	16,398	21.6
Democratic	Richard Gonzalez	8,921	12.0
Total votes		74,950	100.0

=== Republican primary ===
==== Candidates ====
===== Nominee =====
- Mark Lorch

==== Primary results ====
Republican primary results
Party	Candidate	Votes	%
Republican	Mark Lorch	5,805	100.0
Total votes		5,805	100.0

=== General election ===
==== Predictions ====
Source	Ranking	As of
The Cook Political Report	Safe D	November 5, 2018
Inside Elections	Safe D	November 5, 2018
Sabato's Crystal Ball	Safe D	November 5, 2018
RCP	Safe D	November 5, 2018
Daily Kos	Safe D	November 5, 2018
538	Safe D	November 7, 2018
CNN	Safe D	October 31, 2018
Politico	Safe D	November 4, 2018

==== Results ====
Illinois's 4th congressional district, 2018
Party	Candidate	Votes	%
Democratic	Jesús "Chuy" García	143,895	86.6
Republican	Mark Lorch	22,294	13.4
Total votes		166,189	100.0
Democratic hold			

== District 5 ==
2018 Illinois's 5th congressional district election
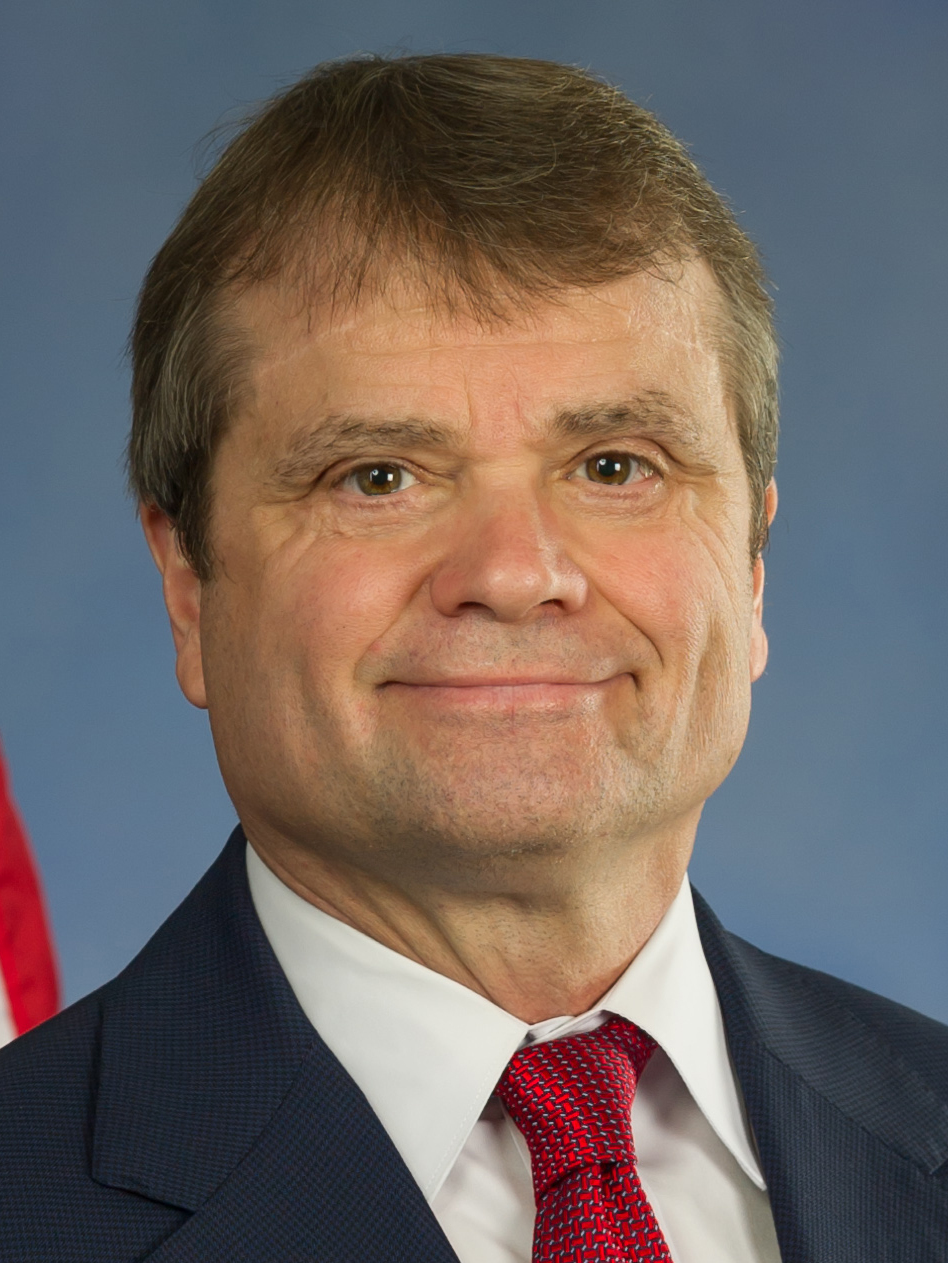

Nominee	Mike Quigley	Tom Hanson
Party	Democratic	Republican
Popular vote	213,992	65,134
Percentage	76.7%	23.3%
- County results Quigley: 50–60% 70–80%
U.S. Representative before election
Mike Quigley
Democratic
Elected U.S. Representative
Mike Quigley
Democratic

Incumbent Democrat Mike Quigley, who had represented the district since 2009, ran for re-election. He was re-elected with 67.8% of the vote in 2016. The district had a PVI of D+20.

Per the Illinois Board of Elections, four Democrats and one Republican filed to run in the 5th congressional district.

=== Democratic primary ===
==== Candidates ====
===== Nominee =====
- Mike Quigley, incumbent U.S. representative

===== Eliminated in primary =====
- Sameena Mustafa
- Steven J. Schwartzberg
- Ben Wolf, former FBI agent

==== Endorsements ====
Sameena Mustafa

Organizations

- Justice Democrats

==== Primary results ====
Democratic primary results
Party	Candidate	Votes	%
Democratic	Mike Quigley (incumbent)	66,254	62.5
Democratic	Sameena Mustafa	25,591	24.1
Democratic	Ben Wolf	10,032	9.5
Democratic	Steven Schwartzberg	4,196	4.0
Total votes		106,073	100.0

=== Candidates ===
==== Nominee ====
- Tom Hanson

==== Primary results ====
Republican primary results
Party	Candidate	Votes	%
Republican	Tom Hanson	18,837	100.0
Total votes		18,837	100.0

=== General election ===
==== Predictions ====
Source	Ranking	As of
The Cook Political Report	Safe D	November 5, 2018
Inside Elections	Safe D	November 5, 2018
Sabato's Crystal Ball	Safe D	November 5, 2018
RCP	Safe D	November 5, 2018
Daily Kos	Safe D	November 5, 2018
538	Safe D	November 7, 2018
CNN	Safe D	October 31, 2018
Politico	Safe D	November 4, 2018

==== Results ====
Illinois's 5th congressional district, 2018
Party	Candidate	Votes	%
Democratic	Mike Quigley (incumbent)	213,992	76.7
Republican	Tom Hanson	65,134	23.3
Independent	Frank Rowder (write-in)	5	0.0
Total votes		279,131	100.0
Democratic hold			

== District 6 ==
2018 Illinois's 6th congressional district election
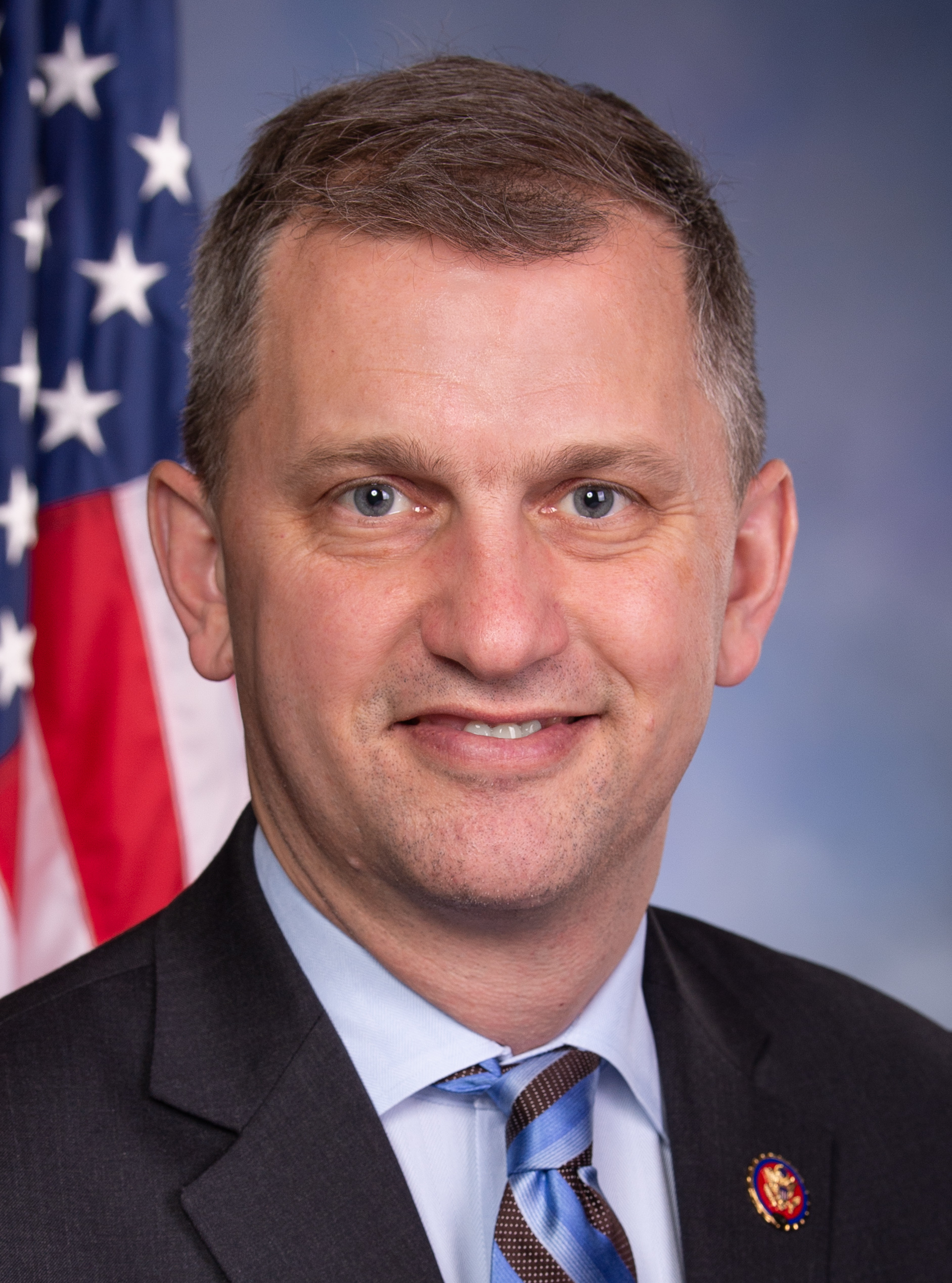

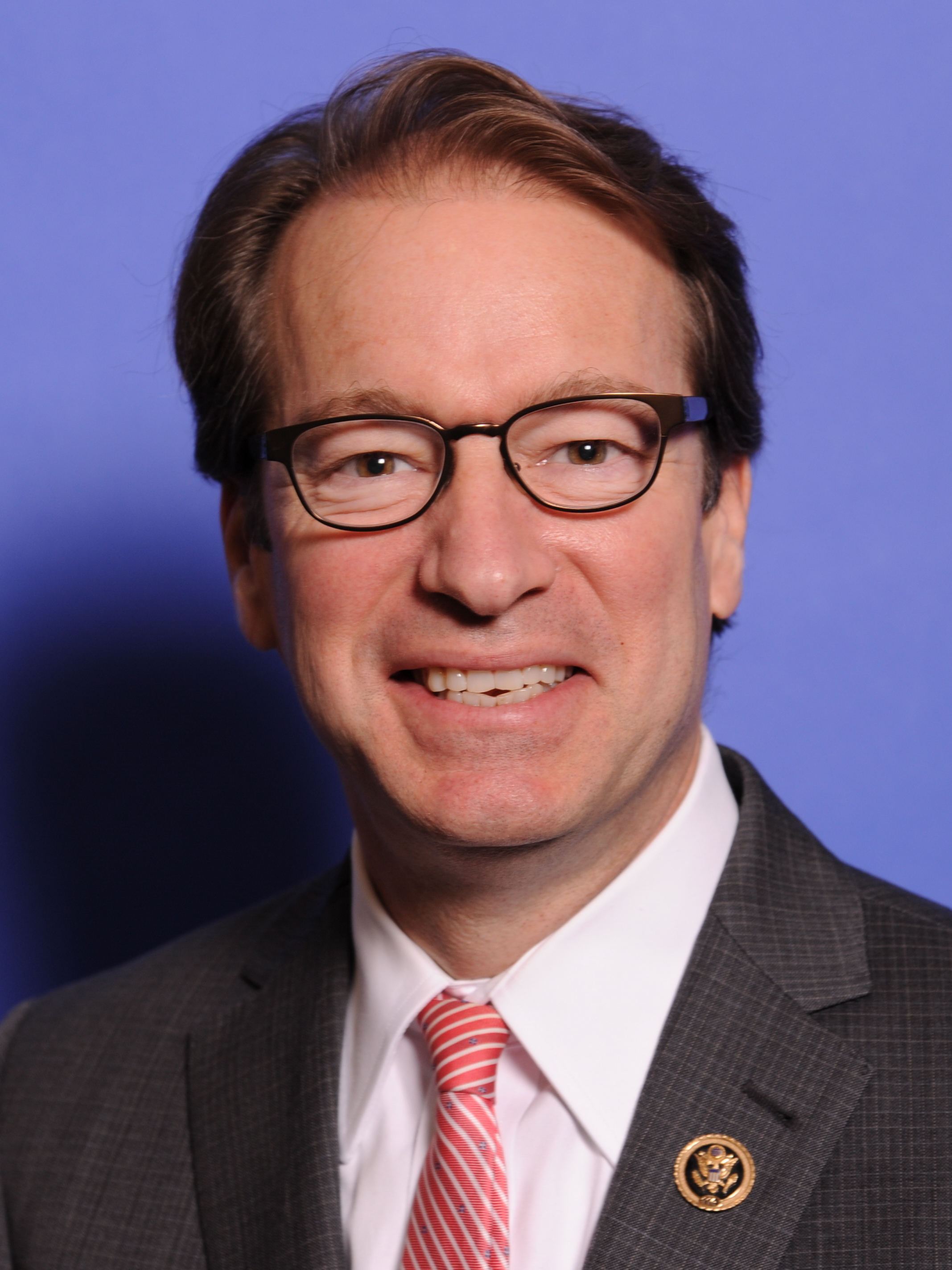
Nominee	Sean Casten	Peter Roskam
Party	Democratic	Republican
Popular vote	169,001	146,445
Percentage	53.6%	46.1%
- County results Casten: 50–60% Roskam: 50–60%
U.S. Representative before election
Peter Roskam
Republican
Elected U.S. Representative
Sean Casten
Democratic

Incumbent Republican Peter Roskam, who had represented the district since 2007, ran for re-election. He was re-elected with 59.2% of the vote in 2016, while Democrat Hillary Clinton defeated Republican Donald Trump in the presidential election by a seven-point margin in that district. The district had a PVI of R+2.

=== Republican primary ===
==== Candidates ====
===== Nominee =====
- Peter Roskam, incumbent U.S. representative

==== Primary results ====
Republican primary results
Party	Candidate	Votes	%
Republican	Peter Roskam (incumbent)	56,544	100.0
Total votes		56,544	100.0

=== Democratic primary ===
Clinton's victory in the historically Republican district led to a large amount of Democratic interest. On January 30, 2017, the Democratic Congressional Campaign Committee announced the 6th as one of three Illinois targets.

==== Candidates ====
===== Nominee =====
- Sean Casten, scientist and former energy business owner

===== Eliminated in primary =====
- Becky Anderson Wilkins, Naperville city council member
- Carole Cheney, former chief of staff to U.S. Representative Bill Foster and candidate for Illinois House of Representatives in 2012
- Amanda Howland, College of Lake County trustee, nominee for this seat in 2016, candidate for Illinois State Senate in 2012 and candidate for Illinois House of Representatives in 2006 & 2008
- Ryan Huffman, data analyst
- Kelly Mazeski, Barrington Hills planning commissioner and candidate for Illinois State Senate in 2016
- Jennifer Zordani, regulatory attorney and former non-profit president

===== Withdrawn =====
- Grace Haaf, business owner and former CIA cyber security analyst
- Suzyn Price, former Naperville Board of Education member

===== Declined =====
- Geoffrey Petzel, candidate for this seat in 2012
- Jason Snelson, restaurant operations manager
- Austin Songer, U.S. Navy veteran

==== Endorsements ====
Carole Cheney

U.S. representatives

- Bill Foster, U.S. representative, Illinois's 11th congressional district
Kelly Mazeski

U.S. representatives

- Cheri Bustos, U.S. representative, Illinois's 17th congressional district
- Jan Schakowsky, U.S. representative, Illinois's 9th congressional district

Organizations

- EMILY's List
- NARAL Pro-Choice America

Newspapers

- Chicago Sun-Times

==== Forum ====
2018 Illinois's 6th congressional district Democratic primary candidate forum
No.	Date	Host	Moderator	Link	Democratic	Democratic	Democratic	Democratic	Democratic	Democratic	Democratic
Key: P Participant A Absent N Not invited I Invited W Withdrawn											
Key: P Participant A Absent N Not invited I Invited W Withdrawn					Sean Casten	Carole Cheney	Amanda Howland	Ryan Huffman	Kelly Mazeski	Becky Anderson Wilkins	Jennifer Zordani
1	Feb. 28, 2018	League of Women Voters of Glen Ellyn	Jan Dorner		P	P	P	P	P	P	P

==== Primary results ====
Democratic primary results
Party	Candidate	Votes	%
Democratic	Sean Casten	19,774	29.5
Democratic	Kelly Mazeski	17,984	26.8
Democratic	Carole Cheney	11,663	17.4
Democratic	Amanda Howland	8,483	12.7
Democratic	Becky Anderson Wilkins	4,001	6.0
Democratic	Jennifer Zordani	2,743	4.1
Democratic	Ryan Huffman	2,365	3.5
Total votes		67,013	100.0

=== General election ===
==== Forum ====
- Complete radio debate (2 parts): July 1, 2018

2018 Illinois's 6th congressional district candidate forum
No.	Date	Host	Moderator	Link	Republican	Democratic
Key: P Participant A Absent N Not invited I Invited W Withdrawn						
Key: P Participant A Absent N Not invited I Invited W Withdrawn					Peter Roskam	Sean Casten
2	Jul. 26, 2018	Lincoln Forum; WFLD	Mike Flannery		P	P

==== Endorsements ====
Sean Casten (D)

U.S. executive branch officials

- Barack Obama, 44th president of the United States

==== Polling ====
Poll source	Date(s) administered	Sample size	Margin of error	Peter Roskam (R)	Sean Casten (D)	Undecided
NYT Upshot/Siena College	October 20–26, 2018	497	± 4.7%	44%	46%	10%
Garin-Hart-Yang Research Group (D) (Note: Poll conducted for the Casten campaign.)	September 29 – October 1, 2018	400	± 4.9%	44%	49%	7%
Garin-Hart-Yang Research Group (D)	September 8–10, 2018	402	± 4.9%	44%	47%	9%
NYT Upshot/Siena College	September 4–6, 2018	512	± 4.7%	45%	44%	11%
Victory Research (R)	July 23–25, 2018	600	± 4.0%	44%	37%	19%
Garin-Hart-Yang Research Group (D)	April 21–23, 2018	401	± 4.9%	45%	44%	11%

Hypothetical polling

Poll source	Date(s) administered	Sample size	Margin of error	Peter Roskam (R)	Democratic opponent (D)	Undecided
Public Policy Polling (D)	November 9–10, 2017	599	± 4.0%	41%	51%	8%

==== Predictions ====
Source	Ranking	As of
The Cook Political Report	Lean D (flip)	November 5, 2018
Inside Elections	Tilt D (flip)	November 5, 2018
Sabato's Crystal Ball	Lean D (flip)	November 5, 2018
RCP	Tossup	November 5, 2018
Daily Kos	Tossup	November 5, 2018
538	Tossup	November 7, 2018
CNN	Tossup	October 31, 2018
Politico	Tossup	November 4, 2018

==== Results ====
Illinois's 6th congressional district, 2018
Party	Candidate	Votes	%
Democratic	Sean Casten	169,001	53.6
Republican	Peter Roskam (incumbent)	146,445	46.4
Majority		22,556	7.2
Total votes		315,446	100.0
Democratic gain from Republican			

== District 7 ==
2018 Illinois's 7th congressional district election
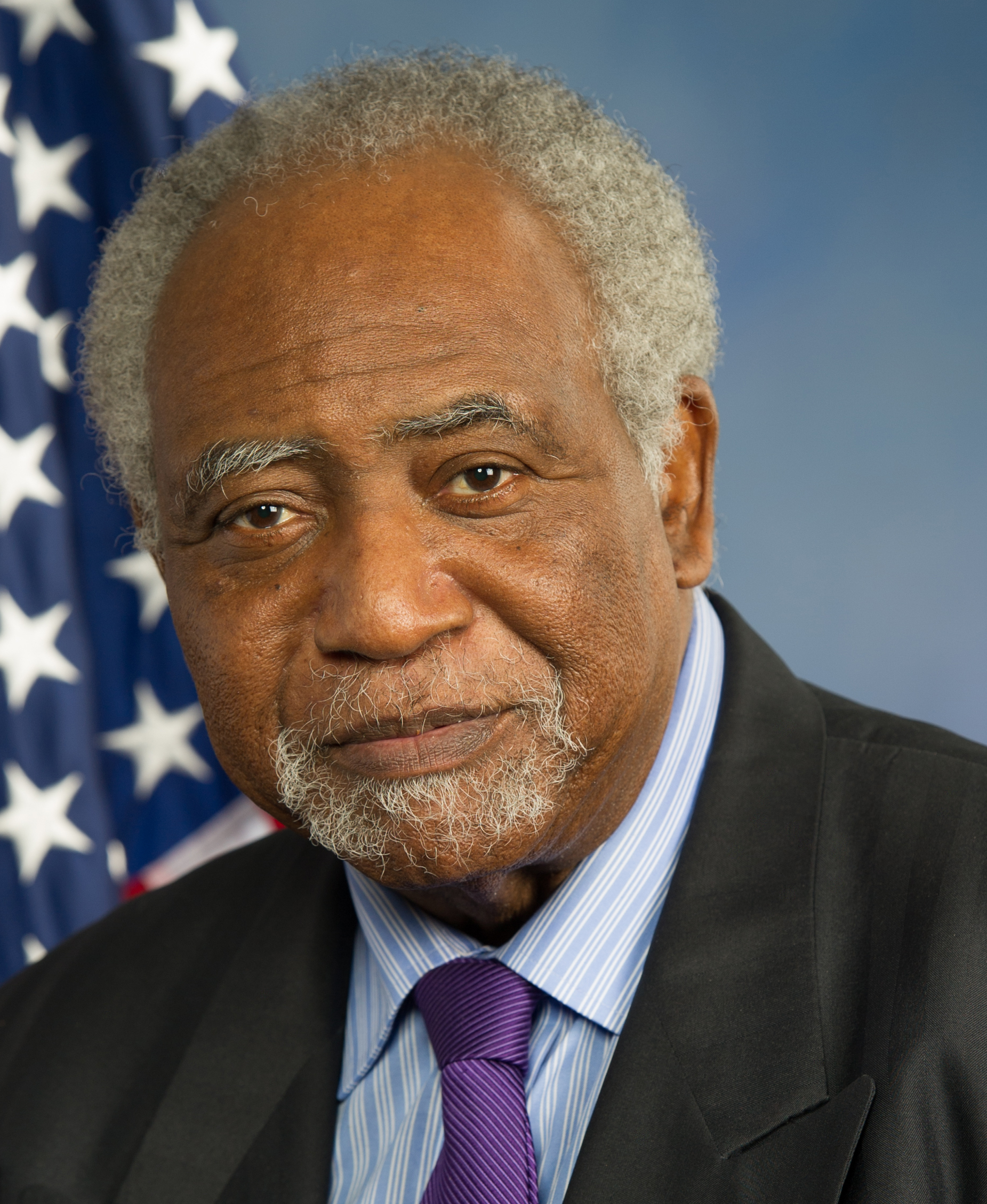

Nominee	Danny K. Davis	Craig Cameron
Party	Democratic	Republican
Popular vote	215,746	30,497
Percentage	87.6%	12.4%
- County results Davis: 80–90%
U.S. Representative before election
Danny K. Davis
Democratic
Elected U.S. Representative
Danny K. Davis
Democratic

Incumbent Democrat Danny K. Davis, who had represented the district since 1997, ran for re-election. He was re-elected with 84.2% of the vote in 2016. The district had a PVI of D+38.

=== Democratic primary ===
==== Candidates ====
===== Nominee =====
- Danny K. Davis, incumbent U.S. representative

===== Eliminated in primary =====
- Anthony Clark, high school teacher

==== Primary results ====
Democratic primary results
Party	Candidate	Votes	%
Democratic	Danny K. Davis (incumbent)	81,570	73.9
Democratic	Anthony Clark	28,867	26.1
Total votes		110,437	100.0

=== Republican primary ===
==== Candidates ====
===== Nominee =====
- Craig Cameron

===== Eliminated in primary =====
- Jeffrey Leef

==== Primary results ====
Republican primary results
Party	Candidate	Votes	%
Republican	Craig Cameron	3,706	56.3
Republican	Jeffrey Leef	2,873	43.7
Total votes		6,579	100.0

=== General election ===
==== Predictions ====
Source	Ranking	As of
The Cook Political Report	Safe D	November 5, 2018
Inside Elections	Safe D	November 5, 2018
Sabato's Crystal Ball	Safe D	November 5, 2018
RCP	Safe D	November 5, 2018
Daily Kos	Safe D	November 5, 2018
538	Safe D	November 7, 2018
CNN	Safe D	October 31, 2018
Politico	Safe D	November 4, 2018

==== Results ====
Illinois's 7th congressional district, 2018
Party	Candidate	Votes	%
Democratic	Danny K. Davis (incumbent)	215,746	87.6
Republican	Craig Cameron	30,497	12.4
Total votes		246,243	100.0
Democratic hold			

== District 8 ==
2018 Illinois's 8th congressional district election
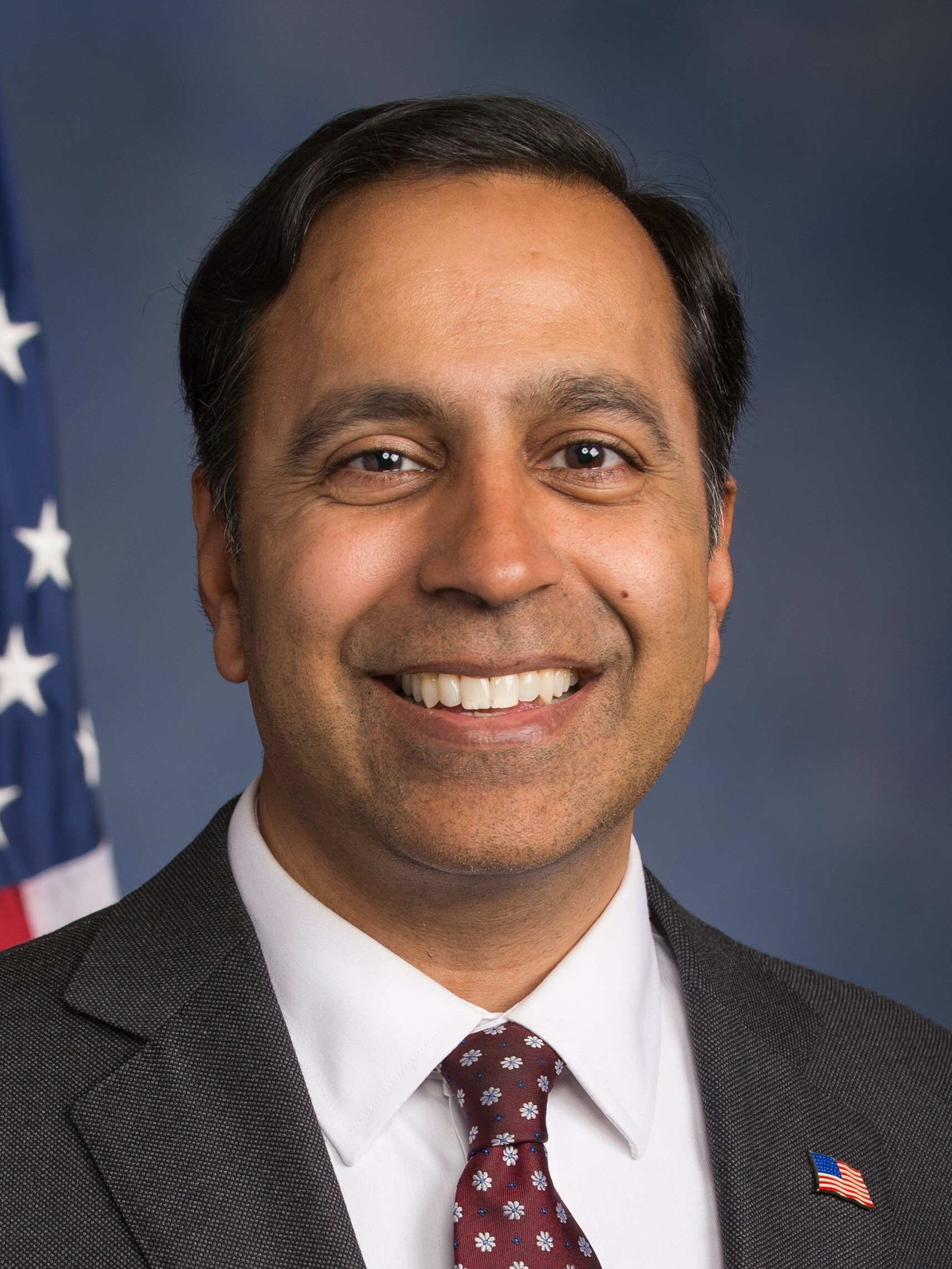

Nominee	Raja Krishnamoorthi	Jitendra "JD" Diganvker
Party	Democratic	Republican
Popular vote	130,054	67,073
Percentage	66.0%	34.0%
- County results Krishnamoorthi: 60–70% 70–80%
U.S. Representative before election
Raja Krishnamoorthi
Democratic
Elected U.S. Representative
Raja Krishnamoorthi
Democratic

Incumbent Democrat Raja Krishnamoorthi, who had represented the district since 2017, ran for re-election. He was elected with 58.3% of the vote in 2016. The district had a PVI of D+8.

=== Democratic primary ===
==== Candidates ====
===== Nominee =====
- Raja Krishnamoorthi, incumbent U.S. representative

==== Primary results ====
Democratic primary results
Party	Candidate	Votes	%
Democratic	Raja Krishnamoorthi (incumbent)	44,042	100.0
Total votes		44,042	100.0

=== Republican primary ===
==== Candidates ====
===== Nominee =====
- Jitendra "JD" Diganvker, entrepreneur

==== Primary results ====
Republican primary results
Party	Candidate	Votes	%
Republican	Jitendra "JD" Diganvker	25,448	100.0
Total votes		25,448	100.0

=== General election ===
==== Predictions ====
Source	Ranking	As of
The Cook Political Report	Safe D	November 5, 2018
Inside Elections	Safe D	November 5, 2018
Sabato's Crystal Ball	Safe D	November 5, 2018
RCP	Safe D	November 5, 2018
Daily Kos	Safe D	November 5, 2018
538	Safe D	November 7, 2018
CNN	Safe D	October 31, 2018
Politico	Safe D	November 4, 2018

==== Results ====
Illinois's 8th congressional district, 2018
Party	Candidate	Votes	%
Democratic	Raja Krishnamoorthi (incumbent)	130,054	66.0
Republican	Jitendra "JD" Diganvker	67,073	34.0
Total votes		197,127	100.0
Democratic hold			

== District 9 ==
2018 Illinois's 9th congressional district election
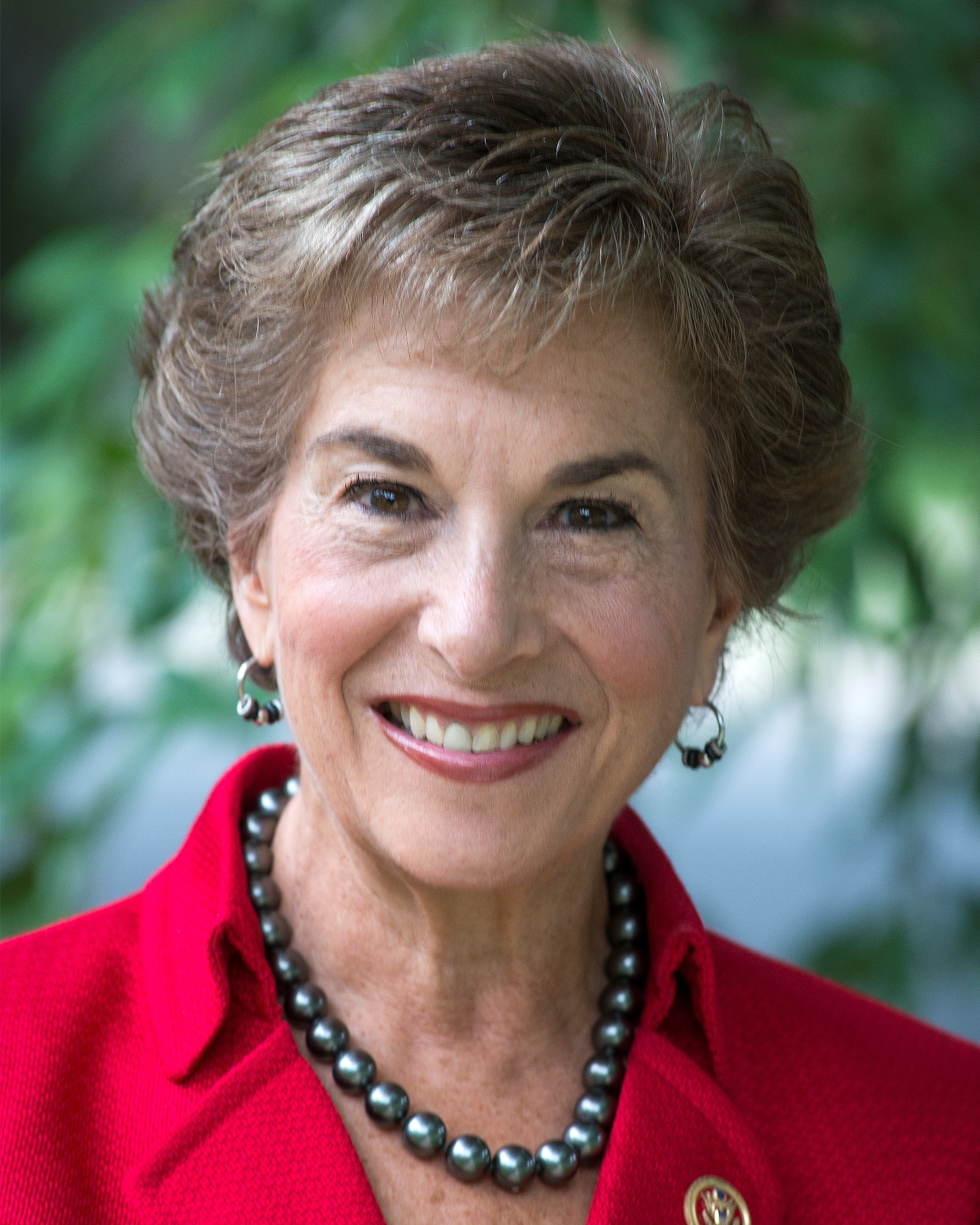

Nominee	Jan Schakowsky	John Elleson
Party	Democratic	Republican
Popular vote	213,368	76,983
Percentage	73.5%	26.5%
- County results Schakowsky: 70–80%
U.S. Representative before election
Jan Schakowsky
Democratic
Elected U.S. Representative
Jan Schakowsky
Democratic

Incumbent Democrat Jan Schakowsky, who had represented the district since 1999, ran for re-election. She was re-elected with 66.5% of the vote in 2016. The district had a PVI of D+18.

=== Democratic primary ===
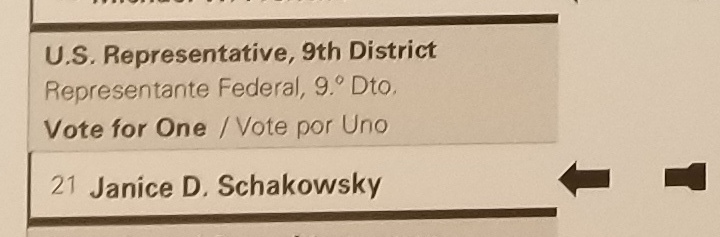
Schakowsky was unopposed in the Democratic primary.

==== Candidates ====
===== Nominee =====
- Jan Schakowsky, incumbent U.S. representative

==== Primary results ====
Democratic primary results
Party	Candidate	Votes	%
Democratic	Jan Schakowsky (incumbent)	108,417	100.0
Total votes		108,417	100.0

=== Republican primary ===
==== Candidates ====
===== Nominee =====
- John D. Elleson, pastor

===== Eliminated in primary =====
- Maxwell Rice
- Sargis Sangari, U.S. Army veteran
- D. Vincent Thomas Jr., U.S. Coast Guard veteran

==== Primary results ====
Republican primary results
Party	Candidate	Votes	%
Republican	John Elleson	10,476	40.4
Republican	Sargis Sangari	7,954	30.7
Republican	D. Vincent Thomas	4,886	18.8
Republican	Maxwell Rice	2,634	10.2
Total votes		25,950	100.0

=== General election ===
==== Predictions ====
Source	Ranking	As of
The Cook Political Report	Safe D	November 5, 2018
Inside Elections	Safe D	November 5, 2018
Sabato's Crystal Ball	Safe D	November 5, 2018
RCP	Safe D	November 5, 2018
Daily Kos	Safe D	November 5, 2018
538	Safe D	November 7, 2018
CNN	Safe D	October 31, 2018
Politico	Safe D	November 4, 2018

==== Results ====
Illinois's 9th congressional district, 2018
Party	Candidate	Votes	%
Democratic	Jan Schakowsky (incumbent)	213,368	73.5
Republican	John Elleson	76,983	26.5
Total votes		290,351	100.0
Democratic hold			

== District 10 ==
2018 Illinois's 10th congressional district election
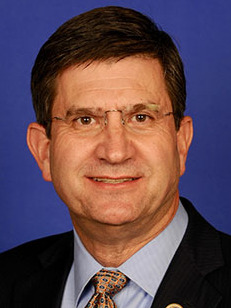

Nominee	Brad Schneider	Doug Bennett
Party	Democratic	Republican
Popular vote	156,540	82,124
Percentage	65.6%	34.4%
- County results Schneider: 60–70%
U.S. Representative before election
Brad Schneider
Democratic
Elected U.S. Representative
Brad Schneider
Democratic

Incumbent Democrat Brad Schneider, who had represented the district since 2017, and previously between 2013 and 2015, ran for re-election. He was reelected with 52.6% of the vote in 2016. The district had a PVI of D+10.

=== Democratic primary ===
==== Candidates ====
===== Nominee =====
- Brad Schneider, incumbent U.S. representative

==== Primary results ====
Democratic primary results
Party	Candidate	Votes	%
Democratic	Brad Schneider (incumbent)	58,195	100.0
Total votes		58,195	100.0

=== Republican primary ===
==== Candidates ====
===== Nominee =====
- Douglas Bennett, computer engineer

===== Eliminated in primary =====
- Sapan Shah, physician
- Jeremy Wynes, midwest director of the American Israel Public Affairs Committee and the Republican Jewish Coalition

==== Primary results ====
Republican primary results
Party	Candidate	Votes	%
Republican	Douglas Bennett	11,026	36.2
Republican	Jeremy Wynes	10,556	34.7
Republican	Sapan Shah	8,841	29.1
Republican	Aloys Rutagwibira	10	0.0
Total votes		30,433	100.0

=== General election ===
==== Predictions ====
Source	Ranking	As of
The Cook Political Report	Safe D	November 5, 2018
Inside Elections	Safe D	November 5, 2018
Sabato's Crystal Ball	Safe D	November 5, 2018
RCP	Safe D	November 5, 2018
Daily Kos	Safe D	November 5, 2018
538	Safe D	November 7, 2018
CNN	Safe D	October 31, 2018
Politico	Safe D	November 4, 2018

==== Results ====
Illinois's 10th congressional district, 2018
Party	Candidate	Votes	%
Democratic	Brad Schneider (incumbent)	156,540	65.6
Republican	Douglas Bennett	82,124	34.4
Total votes		238,664	100.0
Democratic hold			

== District 11 ==
2018 Illinois's 11th congressional district election
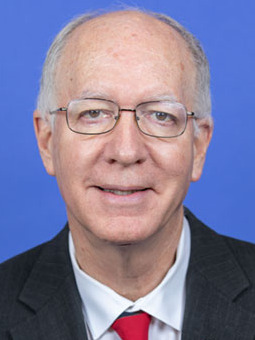

Nominee	Bill Foster	Nick Stella
Party	Democratic	Republican
Popular vote	145,407	82,358
Percentage	63.8%	36.2%
- County results Foster: 60–70% 70–80% Stella: 50–60%
U.S. Representative before election
Bill Foster
Democratic
Elected U.S. Representative
Bill Foster
Democratic

Incumbent Democrat Bill Foster, who had represented the district since 2013 and had previously served the 14th district from 2008 to 2011, ran for re-election. He was re-elected with 60.4% of the vote in 2016. The district had a PVI of D+9.

=== Democratic primary ===
==== Candidates ====
===== Nominee =====
- Bill Foster, incumbent U.S. representative

==== Primary results ====
Democratic primary results
Party	Candidate	Votes	%
Democratic	Bill Foster (incumbent)	49,762	100.0
Total votes		49,762	100.0

=== Republican primary ===
==== Candidates ====
===== Nominee =====
- Nick Stella

===== Eliminated in primary =====
- Connor Vlakancic

==== Primary results ====
Republican primary results
Party	Candidate	Votes	%
Republican	Nick Stella	23,992	79.3
Republican	Connor Vlakancic	6,253	20.7
Total votes		30,245	100.0

=== General election ===
==== Predictions ====
Source	Ranking	As of
The Cook Political Report	Safe D	November 5, 2018
Inside Elections	Safe D	November 5, 2018
Sabato's Crystal Ball	Safe D	November 5, 2018
RCP	Safe D	November 5, 2018
Daily Kos	Safe D	November 5, 2018
538	Safe D	November 7, 2018
CNN	Safe D	October 31, 2018
Politico	Safe D	November 4, 2018

==== Results ====
Illinois's 11th congressional district, 2018
Party	Candidate	Votes	%
Democratic	Bill Foster (incumbent)	145,407	63.8
Republican	Nick Stella	82,358	36.2
Total votes		227,765	100.0
Democratic hold			

== District 12 ==
2018 Illinois's 12th congressional district election
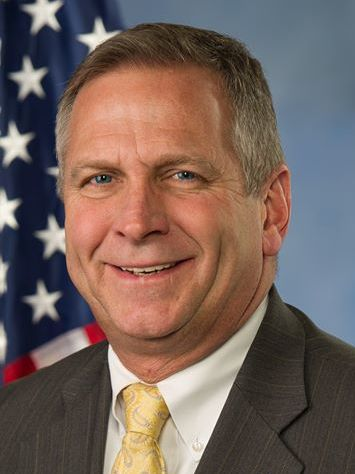

Nominee	Mike Bost	Brendan Kelly
Party	Republican	Democratic
Popular vote	134,884	118,724
Percentage	51.6%	45.4%
- County results Bost: 50–60% 60–70% Kelly: 40–50% 50–60%
U.S. Representative before election
Mike Bost
Republican
Elected U.S. Representative
Mike Bost
Republican

Incumbent Republican Mike Bost, who had represented the district since 2015, ran for re-election. He was re-elected with 54.3% of the vote in 2016. The district had a PVI of R+5.

=== Republican primary ===
==== Candidates ====
===== Nominee =====
- Mike Bost, incumbent U.S. representative

===== Eliminated in primary =====
- Preston Nelson

==== Primary results ====
Republican primary results
Party	Candidate	Votes	%
Republican	Mike Bost (incumbent)	31,658	83.5
Republican	Preston Nelson	6,258	16.5
Total votes		37,916	100.0

=== Democratic primary ===
On May 22, 2017, the Democratic Congressional Campaign Committee announced the 12th as a target on the list of expanded targets.

==== Candidates ====
===== Nominee =====
- Brendan Kelly, St. Clair County state attorney

===== Eliminated in primary =====
- David Bequette, businessman

===== Withdrawn =====
- Adam King, bartender and former archive technician at the National Archives and Records Administration
- Pat McMahan, Mascoutah city councilman
- Chris Miller, businessman
- Dean Pruitt, businessman, mathematician, and co-founder and former science director of the City Museum
- John Sholar, attorney

===== Declined =====
- Nathan Colombo, marketing executive

==== Primary results ====
Democratic primary results
Party	Candidate	Votes	%
Democratic	Brendan Kelly	40,555	81.0
Democratic	David Bequette	9,526	19.0
Total votes		50,081	100

=== Green primary ===
==== Candidates ====
===== Nominee =====
- Randall Auxier, professor of philosophy and communications studies at Southern Illinois University – Carbondale

==== Primary results ====
Green primary results
Party	Candidate	Votes	%
Green	Randall Auxier	131	100.0
Total votes		131	100.0

=== General election ===
==== Endorsements ====
Mike Bost (R)

U.S. executive branch officials

- Donald Trump, 45th president of the United States
Brendan Kelly (D)

U.S. executive branch officials

- Barack Obama, 44th president of the United States

==== Debates ====
2018 Illinois's 12th congressional district debate
No.	Date	Host	Moderator	Link	Republican	Democratic	Green
Key: P Participant A Absent N Not invited I Invited W Withdrawn							
Key: P Participant A Absent N Not invited I Invited W Withdrawn					Mike Bost	Brendan Kelly	Randall Auxier
1	Oct. 23, 2018	WSIU-TV	Jak Tichenor		P	P	P

==== Polling ====
Poll source	Date(s) administered	Sample size	Margin of error	Mike Bost (R)	Brendan Kelly (D)	Randall Auxier (G)	Undecided
NYT Upshot/Siena College	October 18–22, 2018	502	± 4.7%	48%	39%	2%	11%
Global Strategy Group (D) (Note: Poll conducted for End Citizens United.)	October 3–7, 2018	404	± 4.9%	46%	45%	–	9%
DCCC Targeting & Analytics (D) (Note: Poll conducted by the Democratic Congressional Campaign Committee.)	September 26–27, 2018	574	± 4.2%	42%	41%	8%	8%
NYT Upshot/Siena College	September 4–6, 2018	533	± 4.6%	44%	43%	–	13%
Public Policy Polling (D) (Note: Poll conducted for the Patriot Majority PAC.)	April 16–17, 2018	622	± 3.9%	44%	39%	–	15%

==== Predictions ====
Source	Ranking	As of
The Cook Political Report	Lean R	November 5, 2018
Inside Elections	Lean R	November 5, 2018
Sabato's Crystal Ball	Tilt R	November 5, 2018
RCP	Lean R	November 5, 2018
Daily Kos	Lean R	November 5, 2018
538	Lean R	November 7, 2018
CNN	Tossup	October 31, 2018
Politico	Lean R	November 4, 2018

==== Results ====
Illinois's 12th congressional district, 2018
Party	Candidate	Votes	%
Republican	Mike Bost (incumbent)	134,884	51.6
Democratic	Brendan Kelly	118,724	45.4
Green	Randall Auxier	7,935	3.0
Majority		16,160	6.2
Total votes		261,543	100.0
Republican hold			

== District 13 ==
2018 Illinois's 13th congressional district election
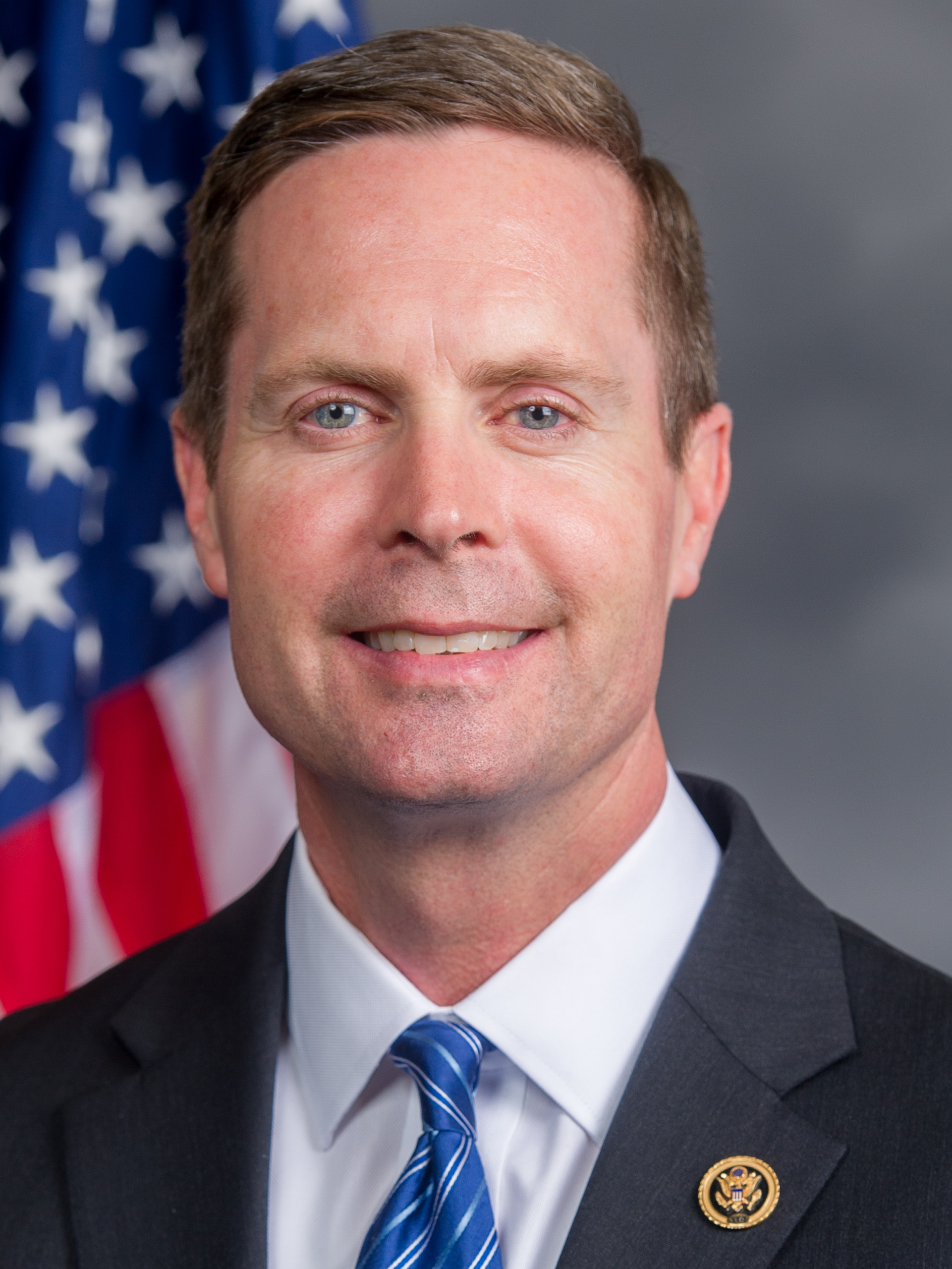

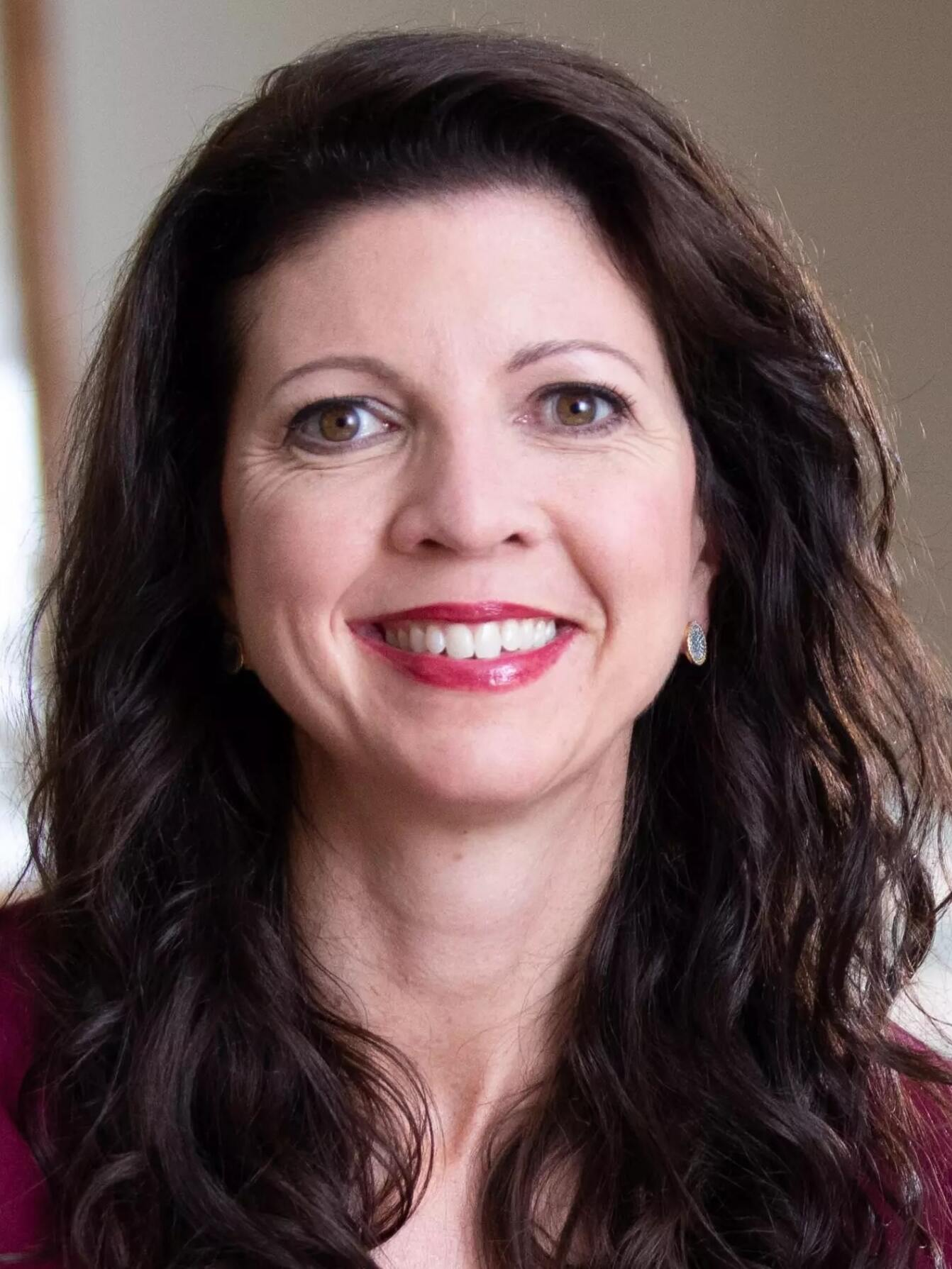
Nominee	Rodney Davis	Betsy Dirksen Londrigan
Party	Republican	Democratic
Popular vote	136,516	134,458
Percentage	50.4%	49.6%
- County results Davis: 50–60% 60–70% 70–80% Londrigan: 50–60% 60–70%
U.S. Representative before election
Rodney Davis
Republican
Elected U.S. Representative
Rodney Davis
Republican

Incumbent Republican Rodney Davis, who had represented the district since 2013, ran for re-election. He was re-elected with 59.7% of the vote in 2016. The district had a PVI of R+3.

=== Republican primary ===
==== Candidates ====
===== Declared =====
- Rodney Davis, incumbent U.S. representative

==== Primary results ====
Republican primary results
Party	Candidate	Votes	%
Republican	Rodney Davis (incumbent)	44,512	100.0
Total votes		44,512	100.0

=== Democratic primary ===
On January 30, 2017, the Democratic Congressional Campaign Committee announced the 13th as one of three Illinois targets.

==== Candidates ====
===== Nominee =====
- Betsy Dirksen Londrigan, nonprofit executive

===== Eliminated in primary =====
- Jon Ebel, director of graduate studies in religion at University of Illinois at Urbana–Champaign
- David Gill, physician and nominee for the 15th district in 2004, 2006, 2010 and for this seat in 2012
- Erik Jones, former Illinois assistant attorney general
- Angel Sides

===== Withdrawn =====
- Benjamin Webb, teacher

===== Declined =====
- Carol Ammons, state representative
- Dillon Clark, Montgomery County board member

==== Endorsements ====
Betsy Dirksen Londrigan

U.S. senators

- Dick Durbin
- Kirsten Gillibrand

Organizations

- EMILY's List
David Gill

Organizations

- Justice Democrats

==== Primary results ====
Democratic primary results
Party	Candidate	Votes	%
Democratic	Betsy Dirksen Londrigan	24,515	45.7
Democratic	Erik Jones	12,024	22.4
Democratic	David Gill	7,757	14.4
Democratic	Jon Ebel	7,167	13.3
Democratic	Angel Sides	2,237	4.2
Total votes		53,700	100.0

=== General election ===
==== Debate ====
2018 Illinois's 13th congressional district debate
No.	Date	Host	Moderator	Link	Republican	Democratic
Key: P Participant A Absent N Not invited I Invited W Withdrawn						
Key: P Participant A Absent N Not invited I Invited W Withdrawn					Rodney Davis	Betsey Londrigan
1	Oct. 18, 2018	Illinois Public Media	Niala Boodhoo		P	P

==== Polling ====
Poll source	Date(s) administered	Sample size	Margin of error	Rodney Davis (R)	Betsy Dirksen Londrigan (D)	Undecided
NYT Upshot/Siena College	October 21–25, 2018	501	± 4.6%	46%	41%	13%
GBA Strategies (D) (Note: Poll conducted for the Longdrigan campaign.)	October 1–4, 2018	500	± 4.4%	49%	48%	–
American Viewpoint (R) (Note: Poll conducted for the Congressional Leadership Fund.)	September 29 – October 1, 2018	400	± 4.9%	50%	37%	9%
Public Policy Polling (D)	April 16–17, 2018	726	± 3.6%	45%	42%	13%

==== Predictions ====
Source	Ranking	As of
The Cook Political Report	Lean R	November 5, 2018
Inside Elections	Lean R	November 5, 2018
Sabato's Crystal Ball	Lean R	November 5, 2018
RCP	Lean R	November 5, 2018
Daily Kos	Lean R	November 5, 2018
538	Lean R	November 7, 2018
CNN	Lean R	October 31, 2018
Politico	Lean R	November 4, 2018

==== Results ====
Illinois's 13th congressional district, 2018
Party	Candidate	Votes	%
Republican	Rodney Davis (incumbent)	136,516	50.4
Democratic	Betsy Dirksen Londrigan	134,458	49.6
Independent	Thomas J. Kuna (write-in)	7	0.0
Majority		2,058	0.8
Total votes		270,981	100.0
Republican hold			

== District 14 ==
2018 Illinois's 14th congressional district election
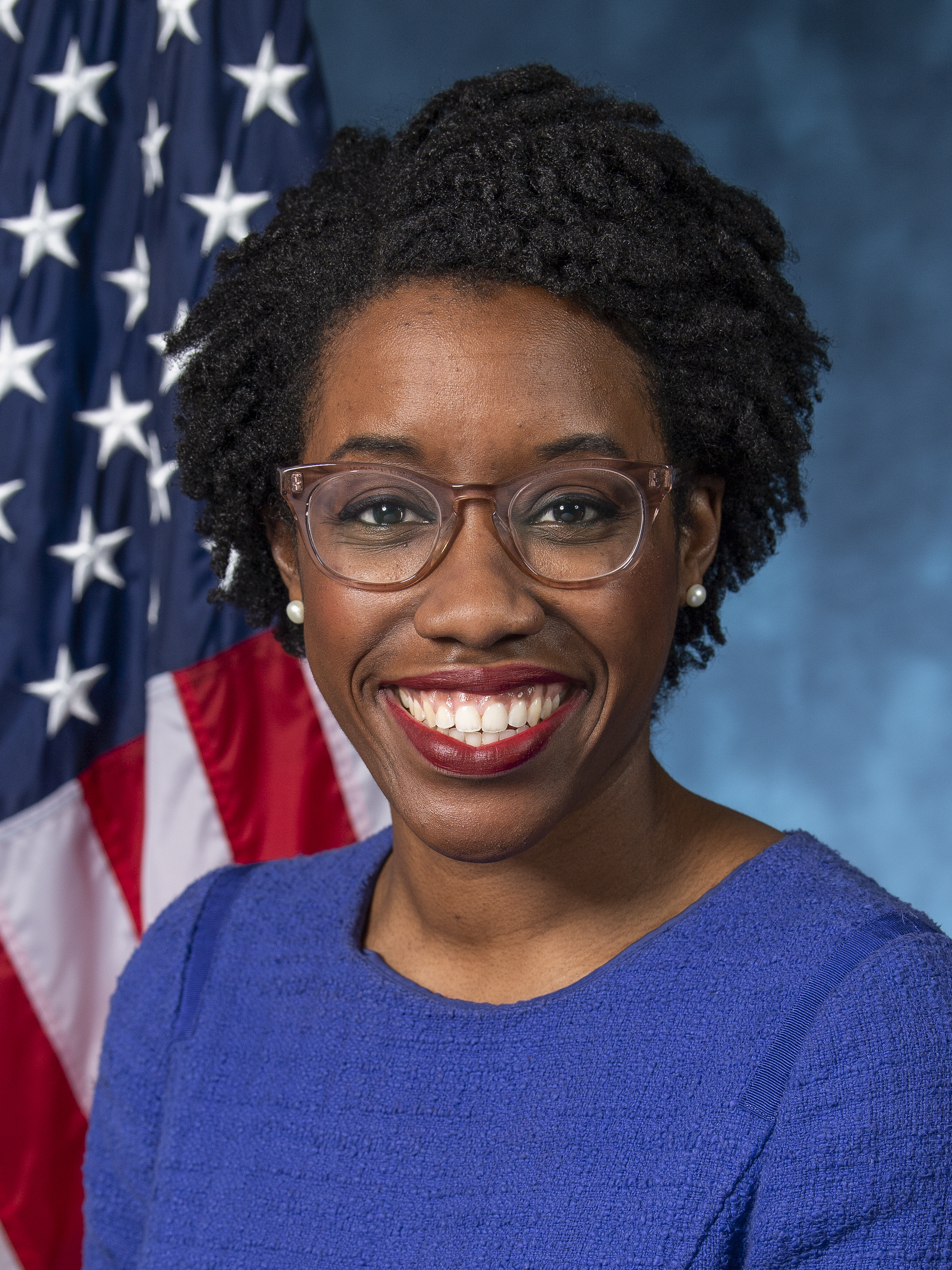

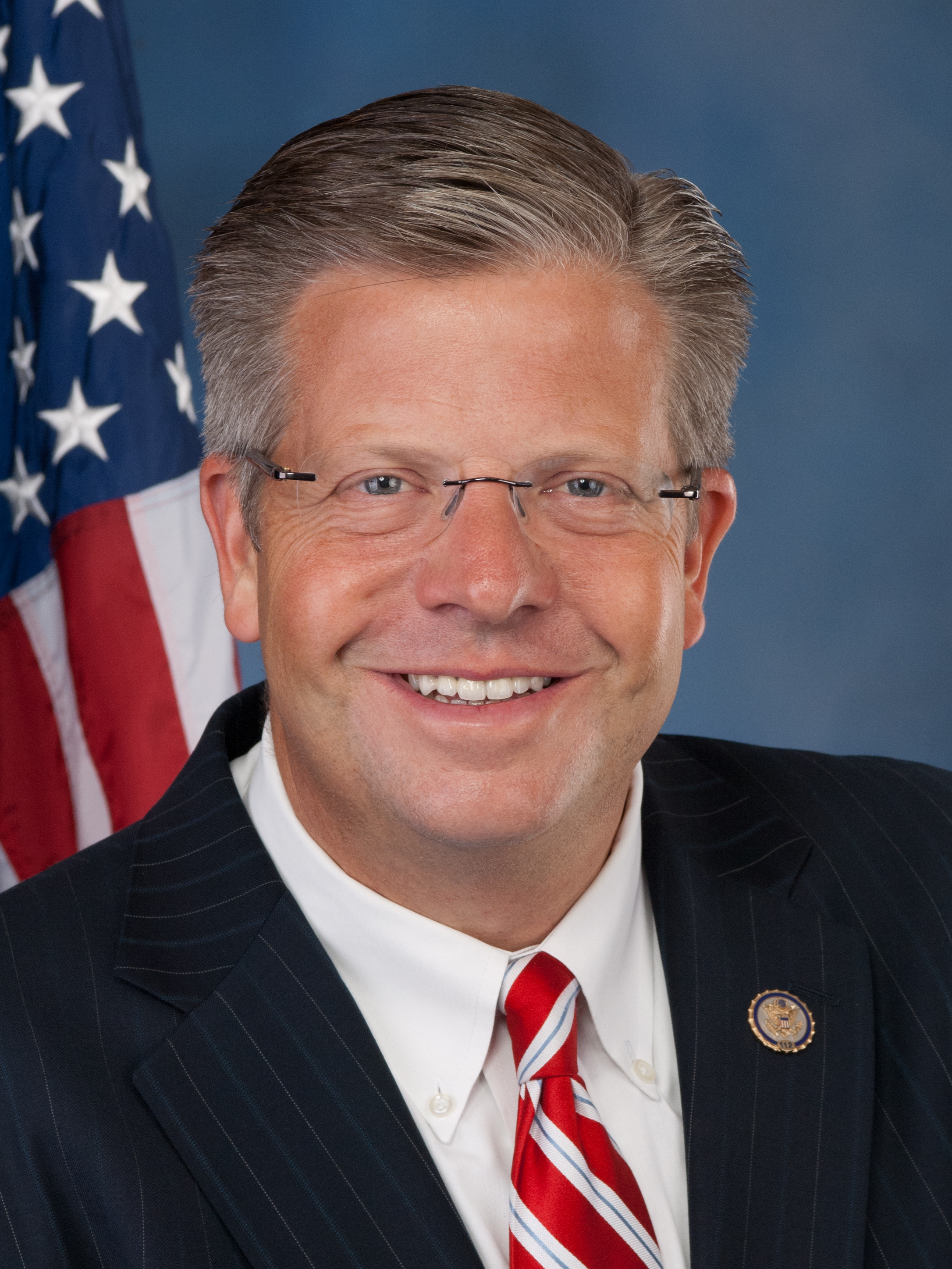
Nominee	Lauren Underwood	Randy Hultgren
Party	Democratic	Republican
Popular vote	156,035	141,164
Percentage	52.5%	47.5%
- County results Underwood: 50–60% 60–70%
U.S. Representative before election
Randy Hultgren
Republican
Elected U.S. Representative
Lauren Underwood
Democratic

Incumbent Randy Hultgren, who had represented the district since 2011, ran for re-election. He was re-elected with 59.3% of the vote in 2016. The district had a PVI of R+5.

=== Republican primary ===
==== Candidates ====
===== Nominee =====
- Randy Hultgren, incumbent U.S. representative

==== Primary results ====
Republican primary results
Party	Candidate	Votes	%
Republican	Randy Hultgren (incumbent)	51,672	100.0
Total votes		51,672	100.0

=== Democratic primary ===
On January 30, 2017, the Democratic Congressional Campaign Committee announced the 14th as one of three Illinois targets.

==== Candidates ====
===== Nominee =====
- Lauren Underwood, nurse and former senior advisor at the U.S. Department of Health and Human Services

===== Eliminated in primary =====
- Matt Brolley, Montgomery village president
- Victor Swanson, high school teacher
- Jim Walz, nominee for this seat in 2016

==== Endorsements ====
Matt Brolley

U.S. representatives

- Bill Foster, U.S. representative from Illinois's 11th congressional district (and former representative from Illinois's 14th congressional district)
- Jan Schakowsky, U.S. representative from Illinois's 9th congressional district

Labor unions

- AFL-CIO
- Illinois Federation of Teachers

Organizations

- Citizen Action Illinois
- Illinois Democratic County Chairs’ Association
- Sierra Club

Newspapers

- Chicago Sun-Times

Local officials

- Mark Pietrowski, DeKalb County chair
- Tom Weisner, former mayor of Aurora, Illinois

==== Primary results ====
Democratic primary results
Party	Candidate	Votes	%
Democratic	Lauren Underwood	29,391	57.3
Democratic	Matthew Brolley	6,845	13.4
Democratic	Jim Walz	5,100	10.0
Democratic	Victor Swanson	3,597	7.0
Democratic	John Hosta	2,578	5.0
Democratic	George Weber	2,570	5.0
Democratic	Daniel Roldan-Johnson	1,170	2.3
Total votes		51,251	100.0

=== General election ===
==== Endorsements ====
Randy Hultgren (R)

U.S. executive branch officials

- Donald Trump, 45th president of the United States
Lauren Underwood (D)

U.S. executive branch officials

- Joe Biden, 47th vice president of the United States
- Barack Obama, 44th president of the United States

Newspapers

- Chicago Sun-Times

==== Polling ====
Poll source	Date(s) administered	Sample size	Margin of error	Randy Hultgren (R)	Lauren Underwood (D)	Undecided
NYT Upshot/Siena College	October 31 – November 4, 2018	428	± 5.0%	43%	49%	8%
NYT Upshot/Siena College	October 3–8, 2018	501	± 4.6%	47%	43%	10%
Public Policy Polling (D)	April 16–17, 2018	682	± 3.8%	45%	41%	14%

==== Predictions ====
Source	Ranking	As of
The Cook Political Report	Tossup	November 5, 2018
Inside Elections	Tossup	November 5, 2018
Sabato's Crystal Ball	Lean D (flip)	November 5, 2018
RCP	Tossup	November 5, 2018
Daily Kos	Tossup	November 5, 2018
538	Lean D (flip)	November 7, 2018
CNN	Lean R	October 31, 2018
Politico	Tossup	November 4, 2018

==== Results ====
Illinois's 14th congressional district, 2018
Party	Candidate	Votes	%
Democratic	Lauren Underwood	156,035	52.5
Republican	Randy Hultgren (incumbent)	141,164	47.5
Majority		14,871	5.0
Total votes		297,199	100.0
Democratic gain from Republican			

== District 15 ==
2018 Illinois's 15th congressional district election
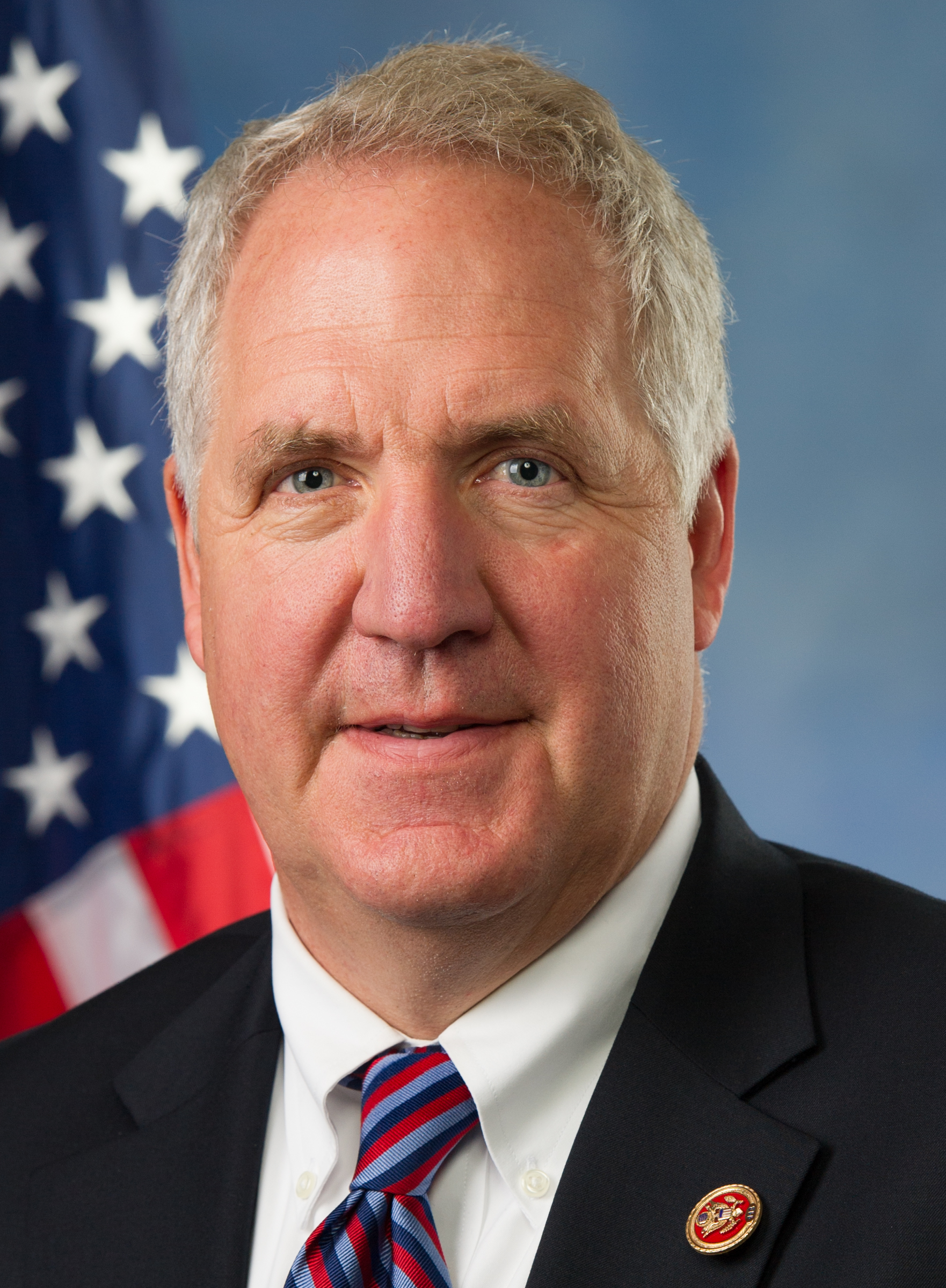

Nominee	John Shimkus	Kevin Gaither
Party	Republican	Democratic
Popular vote	181,294	74,309
Percentage	70.9%	29.1%
- County results Shimkus: 60–70% 70–80% 80–90%
U.S. Representative before election
John Shimkus
Republican
Elected U.S. Representative
John Shimkus
Republican

Incumbent Republican John Shimkus, who had represented the district since 1997, ran for re-election. He was re-elected with 100.0% of the vote in 2016. The district had a PVI of R+21.

=== Republican primary ===
==== Candidates ====
===== Nominee =====
- John Shimkus, incumbent U.S. representative

==== Primary results ====
Republican primary results
Party	Candidate	Votes	%
Republican	John Shimkus (incumbent)	73,825	100.0
Total votes		73,825	100.0

=== Democratic primary ===
==== Candidates ====
===== Nominee =====
- Kevin Gaither, teacher

===== Eliminated in primary =====
- Carl Spoerer

===== Withdrawn =====
- Anthony March

==== Primary results ====
Democratic primary results
Party	Candidate	Votes	%
Democratic	Kevin Gaither	17,300	62.1
Democratic	Carl Spoerer	10,573	37.9
Total votes		27,873	100.0

=== General election ===
==== Predictions ====
Source	Ranking	As of
The Cook Political Report	Safe R	November 5, 2018
Inside Elections	Safe R	November 5, 2018
Sabato's Crystal Ball	Safe R	November 5, 2018
RCP	Safe R	November 5, 2018
Daily Kos	Safe R	November 5, 2018
538	Safe R	November 7, 2018
CNN	Safe R	October 31, 2018
Politico	Safe R	November 4, 2018

==== Results ====
Illinois's 15th congressional district, 2018
Party	Candidate	Votes	%
Republican	John Shimkus (incumbent)	181,294	70.9
Democratic	Kevin Gaither	74,309	29.1
Independent	Tim E. Buckner (write-in)	5	0.0
Total votes		255,608	100.0
Republican hold			

== District 16 ==
2018 Illinois's 16th congressional district election
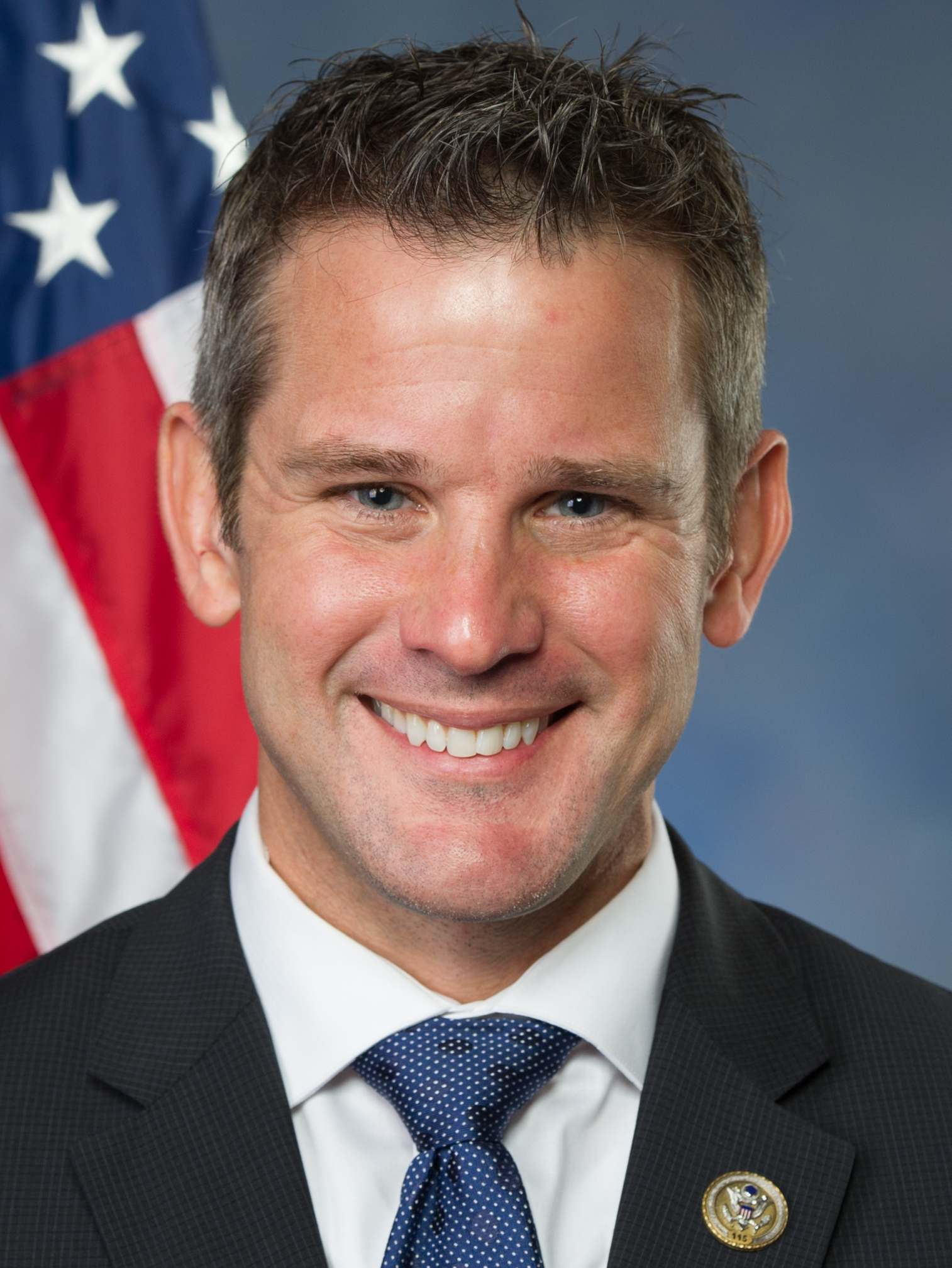

Nominee	Adam Kinzinger	Sara Dady
Party	Republican	Democratic
Popular vote	151,254	104,569
Percentage	59.1%	40.9%
- County results Kinzinger: 50–60% 60–70% 70–80% 80–90% Dady: 50–60%
U.S. Representative before election
Adam Kinzinger
Republican
Elected U.S. Representative
Adam Kinzinger
Republican

Incumbent Republican Adam Kinzinger, who had represented the district since 2011, ran for re-election. He was re-elected with 100.0% of the vote in 2016. The district had a PVI of R+8.

=== Republican primary ===
==== Candidates ====
===== Nominee =====
- Adam Kinzinger, incumbent U.S. representative

===== Eliminated in primary =====
- James Marter, candidate for U.S. Senate in 2016

==== Primary results ====
Republican primary results
Party	Candidate	Votes	%
Republican	Adam Kinzinger (incumbent)	44,878	67.9
Republican	Jim Marter	21,242	32.1
Total votes		66,120	100.0

=== Democratic primary ===
==== Candidates ====
===== Nominee =====
- Sara Dady, lawyer

===== Eliminated in primary =====
- Neill Mohammad, healthcare management consultant
- Amy Murri Briel

===== Withdrew =====
- Chris Minelli, attorney

==== Primary results ====
Democratic primary results
Party	Candidate	Votes	%
Democratic	Sara Dady	17,713	40.3
Democratic	Neill Mohammad	11,599	27.2
Democratic	Amy Briel	8,291	19.5
Democratic	Beth Vercolio-Osmund	5,526	13.0
Total votes		43,129	100.0

=== General election ===
==== Predictions ====
Source	Ranking	As of
The Cook Political Report	Safe R	November 5, 2018
Inside Elections	Safe R	November 5, 2018
Sabato's Crystal Ball	Safe R	November 5, 2018
RCP	Safe R	November 5, 2018
Daily Kos	Safe R	November 5, 2018
538	Safe R	November 7, 2018
CNN	Safe R	October 31, 2018
Politico	Safe R	November 4, 2018

==== Polling ====
Poll source	Date(s) administered	Sample size	Margin of error	Adam Kinzinger (R)	Sara Dady (D)	Undecided
Change Research (D)	October 27–29, 2018	554	–	55%	41%	4%

==== Results ====
Illinois's 16th congressional district, 2018
Party	Candidate	Votes	%
Republican	Adam Kinzinger (incumbent)	151,254	59.1
Democratic	Sara Dady	104,569	40.9
Independent	John M. Stassi (write-in)	2	0.0
Majority		46,685	18.2
Total votes		255,825	100.0
Republican hold			

== District 17 ==
2018 Illinois's 17th congressional district election
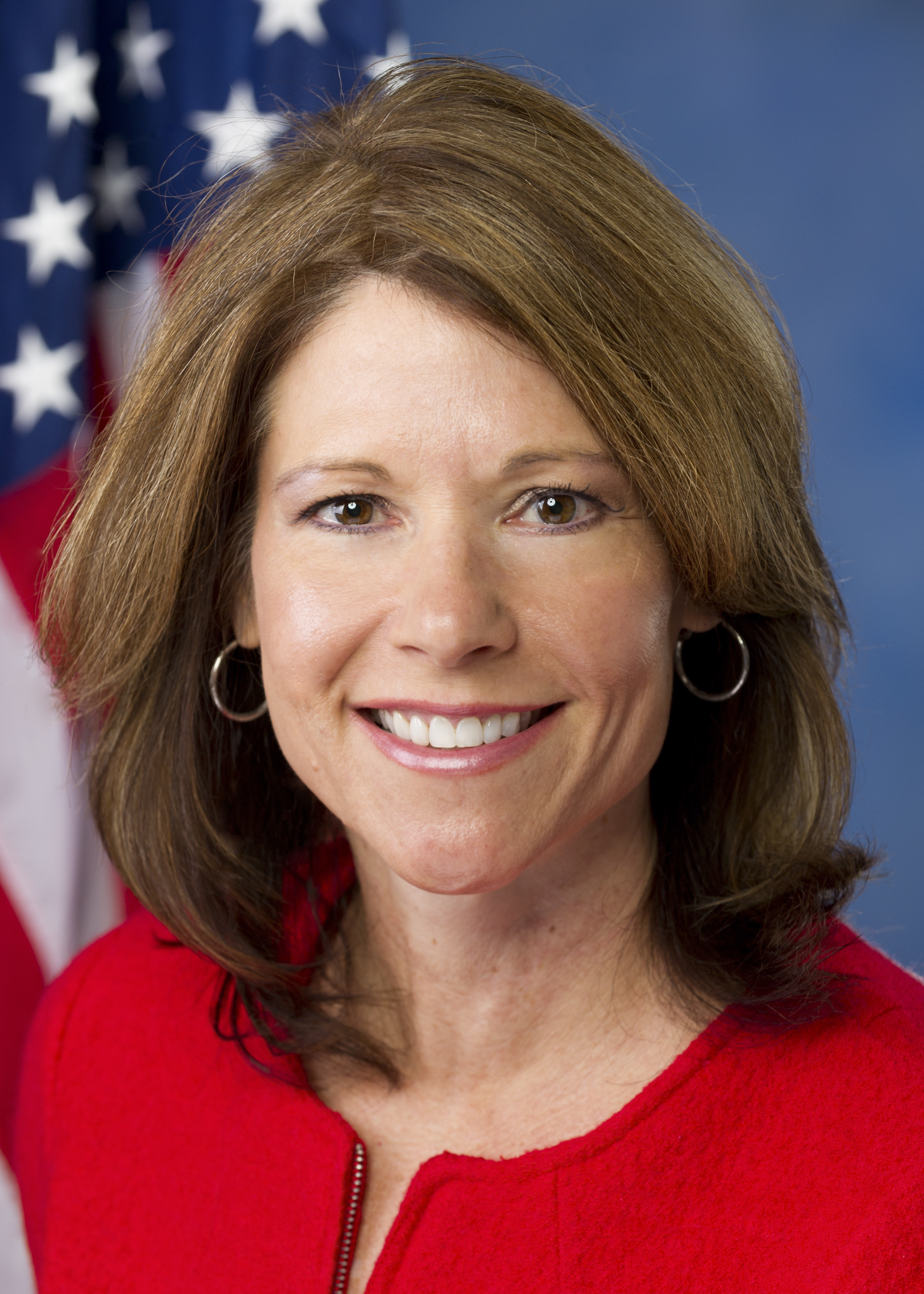

Nominee	Cheri Bustos	Bill Fawell
Party	Democratic	Republican
Popular vote	142,659	87,090
Percentage	62.1%	37.9%
- County results Bustos: 50–60% 60–70% 70–80%
U.S. Representative before election
Cheri Bustos
Democratic
Elected U.S. Representative
Cheri Bustos
Democratic

Incumbent Democrat Cheri Bustos, who had represented the district since 2013, ran for re-election, after exploring a run for governor of Illinois. She was re-elected with 60.3% of the vote in 2016, while Republican Donald Trump defeated Democrat Hillary Clinton in the presidential election by less than a one-point margin in the district. The district had a PVI of D+3.

=== Democratic primary ===
==== Candidates ====
===== Nominee =====
- Cheri Bustos, incumbent U.S. representative

==== Primary results ====
Democratic primary results
Party	Candidate	Votes	%
Democratic	Cheri Bustos (incumbent)	42,964	100.0
Total votes		42,964	100.0

=== Republican primary ===
On February 8, 2017, the National Republican Congressional Committee announced the 17th as one of its initial targets.

==== Candidates ====
===== Nominee =====
- Bill Fawell, real estate broker

==== Primary results ====
Republican primary results
Party	Candidate	Votes	%
Republican	Bill Fawell	38,411	100.0
Total votes		38,411	100.0

=== General election ===
==== Predictions ====
Source	Ranking	As of
The Cook Political Report	Safe D	November 5, 2018
Inside Elections	Safe D	November 5, 2018
Sabato's Crystal Ball	Safe D	November 5, 2018
RCP	Safe D	November 5, 2018
Daily Kos	Safe D	November 5, 2018
538	Safe D	November 7, 2018
CNN	Safe D	October 31, 2018
Politico	Safe D	November 4, 2018

==== Results ====
Illinois's 17th congressional district, 2018
Party	Candidate	Votes	%
Democratic	Cheri Bustos (incumbent)	142,659	62.1
Republican	Bill Fawell	87,090	37.9
Total votes		229,749	100.0
Democratic hold			

== District 18 ==
2018 Illinois's 18th congressional district election
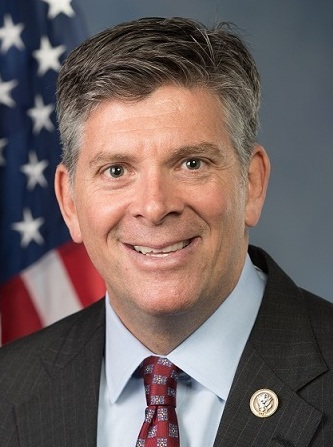

Nominee	Darin LaHood	Junius Rodriguez
Party	Republican	Democratic
Popular vote	195,927	95,486
Percentage	67.2%	32.8%
- County results LaHood: 60–70% 70–80% 80–90%
U.S. Representative before election
Darin LaHood
Republican
Elected U.S. Representative
Darin LaHood
Republican

Incumbent Republican Darin LaHood, who had represented the district since 2015, ran for re-election. He was re-elected with 72.1% of the vote in 2016. The district had a PVI of R+15.

=== Republican primary ===
==== Candidates ====
===== Nominee =====
- Darin LaHood, incumbent U.S. representative

===== Eliminated in primary =====
- Donald Rients

==== Primary results ====
Republican primary results
Party	Candidate	Votes	%
Republican	Darin LaHood (incumbent)	61,722	78.9
Republican	Donald Rients	16,535	21.1
Total votes		78,257	100.0

=== Democratic primary ===
==== Candidates ====
===== Nominee =====
- Junius Rodriguez, history professor

===== Eliminated in primary =====
- Brian Deters
- Darrel Miller

==== Primary results ====
Democratic primary results
Party	Candidate	Votes	%
Democratic	Junius Rodriguez	14,990	41.7
Democratic	Brian Deters	14,189	39.5
Democratic	Darrel Miller	6,757	18.8
Total votes		35,936	100.0

=== General election ===
==== Predictions ====
Source	Ranking	As of
The Cook Political Report	Safe R	November 5, 2018
Inside Elections	Safe R	November 5, 2018
Sabato's Crystal Ball	Safe R	November 5, 2018
RCP	Safe R	November 5, 2018
Daily Kos	Safe R	November 5, 2018
538	Safe R	November 7, 2018
CNN	Safe R	October 31, 2018
Politico	Safe R	November 4, 2018

==== Results ====
Illinois's 18th congressional district, 2018
Party	Candidate	Votes	%
Republican	Darin LaHood (incumbent)	195,927	67.2
Democratic	Junius Rodriguez	95,486	32.8
Total votes		291,413	100.0
Republican hold			

== Notes ==
Partisan clients
