= Randall Auxier =

American academic

- Born: Randall E. Auxier; 1961 (age 64–65); Leitchfield, Kentucky, US
- Spouse: Gaye Chandler Auxier

Education
- Education: University of Memphis

Philosophical work
- Institutions: Emory University
- Main interests: Metaphysics; Philosophy of culture; Aesthetics

Randall E. Auxier (born August 7, 1961) is a professor of philosophy and communication studies at Southern Illinois University Carbondale, a musician, environmental activist, union advocate, and 2018 candidate for the United States House of Representatives, nominated by the Green Party in the 12th Congressional District of Illinois. He is also a co-director of the American Institute for Philosophical and Cultural Thought.

In philosophy, Auxier specializes in classical American thought, process metaphysics and theology, intensive logics, aesthetics, philosophical anthropology, and the philosophy of culture, of science, of religion, and of education.

== Career and views ==
In 2017, Auxier was a visiting professor at the Institute of Philosophy of the University of Warsaw.

=== Metaphysics and formal philosophy ===
Auxier defends a version of process-relational metaphysics called "analogical realism." Built from his theory of analogy first articulated in his 1992 dissertation, he argues that the language of metaphysics should be divided into operational language and functional language. His theories of actuality, potentiality, and possibility derive from these distinctions. Arguing that possibility should be thought of (hypothetically) as uncreated and unaffected by temporal passage and that it is also immediately experienced by human beings, and that its form is inferred by means of contrast with the experience of the "egress" of possibility.

=== Method and logic ===
He is a radical empiricist in method. Favoring and teaching the analytical syllogistics of Delton Thomas Howard as a normative formalization of active thinking, and Susanne Langer's logic as an imaginative formalization of spatialized thinking, when removed from metaphysics and treated as a separate system of extensional thinking; emphasizing the role of imagination in symbol creation in line with Kantian and neo-Kantian theories, such as Cassirer's.

=== Philosophy of culture ===
His theories in the philosophy of culture derive from the ideas of Giambattista Vico and Michel Foucault. He holds that valuable life and fully human development is evident in traditional human life and that the individualism of the Western world is a tragic development, while also seeing popular culture as continuous with high culture and generally to be preferred over high culture as livelier and more important to the community as a whole.

=== Ethics and political philosophy ===
In ethics and political philosophy, Auxier is a personalist. Holding that the highest value of the community and the aim of social life is the fullest available determination of "the beloved community" (per Josiah Royce and Martin Luther King Jr.), which is wholly actual in the present, but left vague by the unwillingness of the community to act on it. He holds that communities which produce independent individuals will both benefit from that process and suffer from the inevitable betrayals that strong individuals choose, in their tragic isolation.

=== Aesthetics ===
Auxier has an aesthetic view drawn from Bergson's account in Matter and Memory (1898), and has argued that music has a singular place in the formation of both human feeling and human culture.

=== Philosophy of science ===
He has criticized Darwinism (but not evolution in general) and general relativity due to seeing them as being closer to philosophy than to science, instead favoring open and temporalist ideas in science such as the physics of the quantum vacuum and certain other evolutionary theories. Arguing that all scientific knowledge proceeds by a kind of mereotopology.

== Publications ==
=== Books ===
- The Quantum of Explanation: Whitehead's Radical Empiricism, co-author (2017)
- The Philosophy of Umberto Eco, co-editor (2017)
- Metaphysical Graffiti: Deep Cuts in the Philosophy of Rock, author (2017)
- The Philosophy of Hilary Putnam, co-editor (2015)
- Time, Will and Purpose: Living Ideas from the Philosophy of Josiah Royce, author (Open Court, 2013)
- The Philosophy of Arthur C. Danto, co-editor (Open Court, 2013)
- The Philosophy of Richard Rorty, co-editor (Open Court, 2010)
- Bruce Springsteen and Philosophy: Darkness on the Edge of Truth, co-editor, contributor (Open Court, 2008)
- The Wizard of Oz and Philosophy: Wicked Wisdom of the West, co-editor, contributor (Open Court, 2008)
- The Philosophy of Michael Dummett, co-editor (Open Court, 2007)
- The Philosophy of Jaakko Hintikka, co-editor (Open Court, 2006)
- The Philosophy of Marjorie Grene, co-editor (Open Court, 2003)
- The Philosophy of Seyyed Hossein Nasr, co-editor (Open Court, 2001)
- Critical Responses to the Philosophy of Josiah Royce, editor (Thoemmes Press, 2001)
- Hartshorne and Brightman on God, Process, and Persons: The Correspondence, co-editor, contributor (Vanderbilt University Press, 2000)

=== Journals ===
- Eidos: A Journal for Philosophy of Culture, deputy chief editor (2017–2024)
- SUNY Series in American Philosophical and Cultural Thought, co-editor (2016–present)
- The Library of Living Philosophers, editor (2001–2013)
- The Pluralist, editor (2006–2012)
- The Personalist Forum, editor (1997–2006)
