= Junius P. Rodriguez =

American historian

Junius Rodriguez
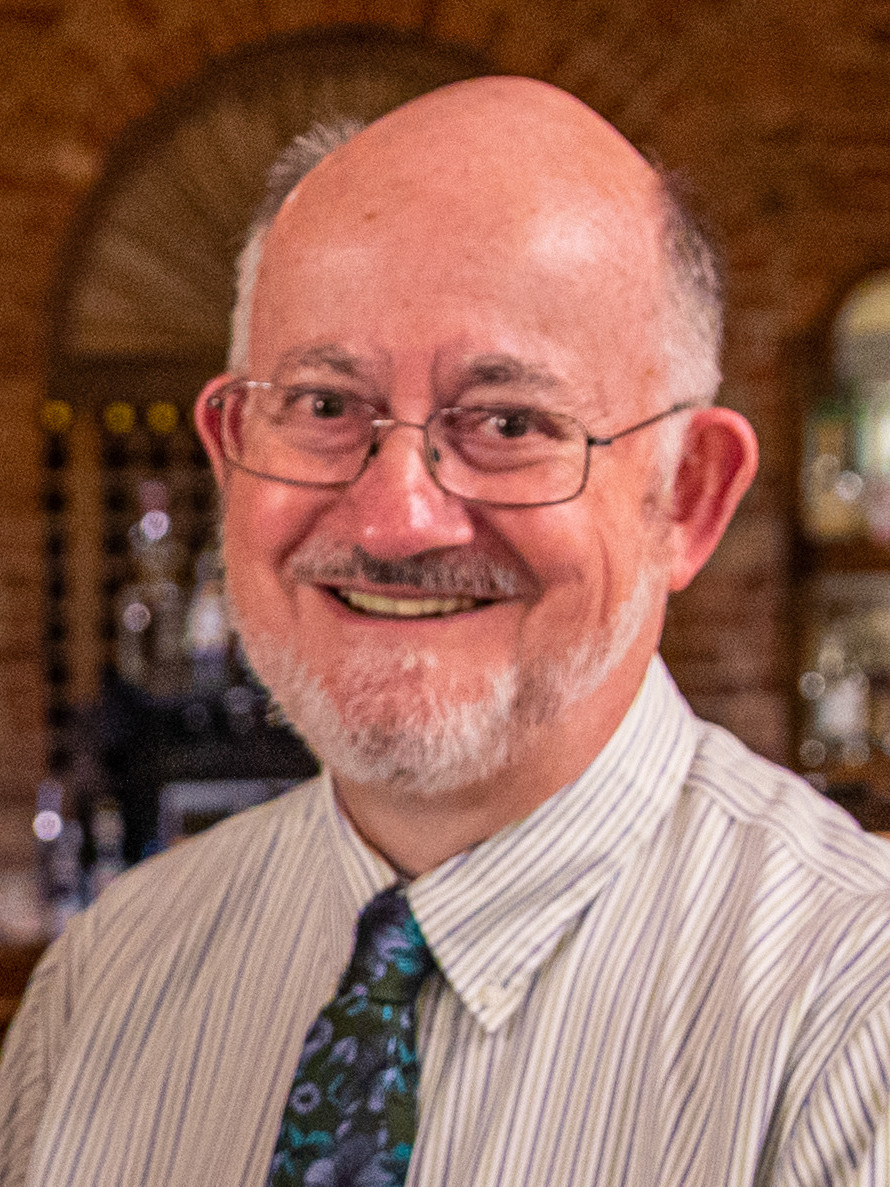
- Rodriguez in 2023

Personal details
- Party: Democratic
- Education: Nicholls State University (BA); Louisiana State University (MA); Auburn University (PhD)

Junius P. Rodriguez is a professor of history at Eureka College in Eureka, Illinois, who has been the general editor of multiple major reference books on the history of slavery in the United States and the world, as well as related topics such as black history and abolitionism. His work on the history of slavery was acclaimed as "outstanding" by other scholars and by librarians, who have recommended it as part of the core collection for every academic library and many public libraries as well.

In July 2017, Rodriguez announced his candidacy for the U.S. House representing Illinois's 18th congressional district in the 2018 U.S. federal midterm election, but lost to incumbent Republican Darin LaHood.

== Career ==
Rodriguez grew up in Louisiana. After earning his B.A. from Nicholls State University (1979), he taught in the public school system of Lafourche Parish, Louisiana, for nearly a decade. Rodriguez served a term as Parish Councilman in Lafourche Parish from 1979-1983.

Rodriguez earned his M.A. from Louisiana State University (1987), and Ph.D. from Auburn University (1992). Rodriguez has been a professor of history at Eureka College since 1992. John Greenfieldt and Patrice Bartell recommended his Encyclopedia of Slave Resistance and Rebellion for public library core collections.

Rodriguez consulted on the development of the documentary Human Bondage, which aired as part of the History Channel's History's Mysteries series in 2000. In 2002, he helped draw national attention to the 500th anniversary of the beginning of the transatlantic slave trade. Journalist DeWayne Wickham described his efforts as "a perfect teachable moment for discussion and reflection" that was fitting for the event.

Rodriguez unsuccessfully challenged incumbent Republican congressman Darin LaHood of Illinois's 18th congressional district in 2016, running as a Democrat. He won 27.9% of the vote to LaHood's 72.1%. His number of votes was the second most ever earned by a Democrat in the Illinois 18th District, despite running as a vacancy appointment on a shortened campaign schedule.

== Works ==
- The Historical Encyclopedia of World Slavery, two volumes (1997) – ABC-CLIO
  - Review: and h
  - Reviews Journal of Southern History,
- Chronology of World Slavery (1999) – ABC-CLIO
- The Louisiana Purchase: A Historical and Geographical Encyclopedia (2002) – ABC-CLIO
- Encyclopedia of Slave Resistance and Rebellion, two volumes (2007) - Greenwood
  - Review: Booklist
  - Review: Public library core collection
- Slavery in the United States: A Social, Political, and Historical Encyclopedia, two volumes (2007) – ABC-CLIO
  - Reviews: Library Media Connection
- Encyclopedia of Emancipation and Abolition in the Transatlantic World, three volumes (2007)
  - Reviews: Against the Grain
- Slavery in the Modern World: A History of Political, Social, and Economic Oppression (ABC-CLIO, 2 vol 2011)

In 2000, Chronology of World Slavery, was included in "Outstanding reference sources 2000", from the American Library Association.
