= Sharon Dixon =

Sharon Dixon could refer to:

- Sharon Pratt (born 1944), formerly Sharon Pratt Dixon, former mayor of Washington, D.C.
- Sharon Denise Dixon (born 1962), former member of the Chicago City Council
