= Gregory Jacobs (disambiguation) =

Gregory Jacobs is an American film producer.

Gregory or Greg Jacobs may also refer to:

- Shock G, born Gregory Edward Jacobs (1963–2021), American rapper
- Greg Jacobs, candidate in the 2010 United States House of Representatives elections in Illinois
