= 2010 United States House of Representatives elections in Illinois =

- November 2, 2010

All 19 Illinois seats to the United States House of Representatives
	Majority party	Minority party
Party	Republican	Democratic
Last election	7	12
Seats won	11	8
Seat change	▲4	▼4
Popular vote	1,720,016	1,876,316
Percentage	46.53%	50.76%
Swing	▲9.16%	▼9.76%

Republican hold Republican gain
Democratic hold
Republican
40–50%
50–60%
60–70%
70–80%
80–90%
Democratic
40–50%
50–60%
60–70%
70–80%
80–90%

Elections were held on November 2, 2010, to determine Illinois's 19 members of the United States House of Representatives. Representatives were elected for two-year terms to serve in the 112th United States Congress from January 3, 2011, until January 3, 2013. Primary elections were held on February 2, 2010.

Of the 19 elections, the 10th, 11th, 14th and 17th districts were rated as competitive by CQ Politics and The Rothenberg Political Report; while the 8th, 10th, 11th, 14th and 17th districts were rated as competitive by The Cook Political Report and Sabato's Crystal Ball.

Of Illinois's nineteen U.S. Representatives, fourteen were re-elected. Republican Mark Kirk of the 10th district did not seek re-election in order to run for the U.S. Senate, while Democrats Melissa Bean of the 8th district, Debbie Halvorson of the 11th district, Bill Foster of the 14th district and Phil Hare of the 17th district were defeated in the general election. Joe Walsh, Adam Kinzinger, Randy Hultgren, and Bobby Schilling were all elected to fill those Democratic-held seats. Bob Dold won Kirk's old seat.

As a result, Illinois became one of four states in which the party that won the state's popular vote did not win a majority of seats in 2010, the other states being Iowa, New Jersey, and North Carolina. As of 2025, this is the last time Republicans won a majority of congressional districts from Illinois.

== Overview ==
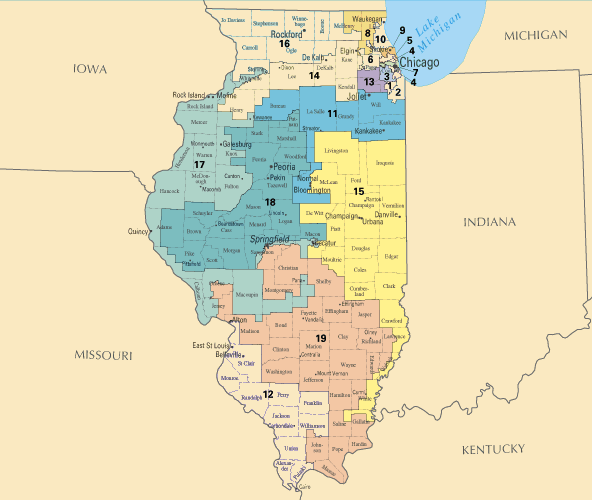
Illinois's congressional districts in 2010

Results of the 2010 United States House of Representatives elections in Illinois by district:

District	Democratic		Republican		Others		Total		Result
District	Votes	%	Votes	%	Votes	%	Votes	%	Result
District 1	148,170	80.36%	29,253	15.86%	6,963	3.78%	184,386	100.0%	Democratic hold
District 2	150,666	80.52%	25,883	13.83%	10,564	5.65%	187,113	100.0%	Democratic hold
District 3	116,120	69.69%	40,479	24.29%	10,028	6.02%	166,627	100.0%	Democratic hold
District 4	63,273	77.36%	11,711	14.32%	6,808	8.32%	81,792	100.0%	Democratic hold
District 5	108,360	70.62%	38,935	25.38%	6,140	4.00%	153,435	100.0%	Democratic hold
District 6	65,379	36.35%	114,456	63.65%	0	0.00%	179,835	100.0%	Republican hold
District 7	149,846	81.50%	29,575	16.09%	4,428	2.41%	183,849	100.0%	Democratic hold
District 8	97,825	48.32%	98,115	48.47%	6,495	3.21%	202,435	100.0%	Republican gain
District 9	117,553	66.34%	55,182	31.14%	4,472	2.52%	177,207	100.0%	Democratic hold
District 10	105,290	48.70%	109,941	51.30%	1	0.00%	215,232	100.0%	Republican hold
District 11	96,019	42.65%	129,108	57.35%	0	0.00%	225,127	100.0%	Republican gain
District 12	121,272	59.83%	74,046	36.53%	7,387	3.64%	202,705	100.0%	Democratic hold
District 13	86,281	36.19%	152,132	63.81%	0	0.00%	238,413	100.0%	Republican hold
District 14	98,645	45.04%	112,369	51.31%	7,999	3.65%	219,013	100.0%	Republican gain
District 15	75,948	35.68%	136,915	64.32%	0	0.00%	212,863	100.0%	Republican hold
District 16	66,037	31.04%	138,299	65.00%	8,425	3.96%	212,761	100.0%	Republican hold
District 17	85,454	42.96%	104,583	52.58%	8,861	0.01%	198,898	100.0%	Republican gain
District 18	57,046	25.79%	152,868	69.12%	11,256	5.09%	221,170	100.0%	Republican hold
District 19	67,132	28.78%	166,166	71.22%	0	0.00%	233,298	100.0%	Republican hold
Total	1,876,316	50.76%	1,720,016	46.54%	99,827	2.70%	3,696,159	100.0%	

== District 1 ==
2010 Illinois's 1st congressional district election
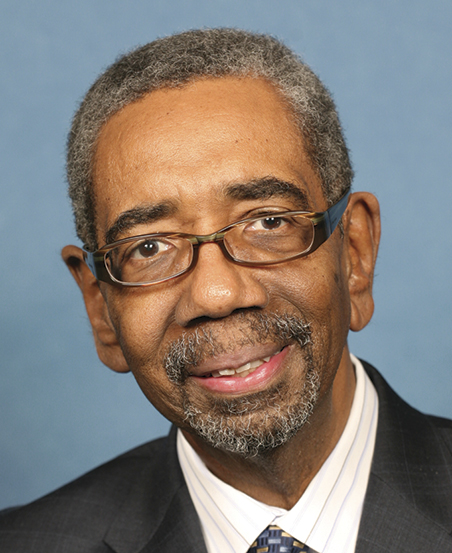

Nominee	Bobby Rush	Ray Wardingley
Party	Democratic	Republican
Popular vote	148,170	29,253
Percentage	80.4%	15.9%
- County results Rush: 80–90%
U.S. Representative before election
Bobby Rush
Democratic
Elected U.S. Representative
Bobby Rush
Democratic

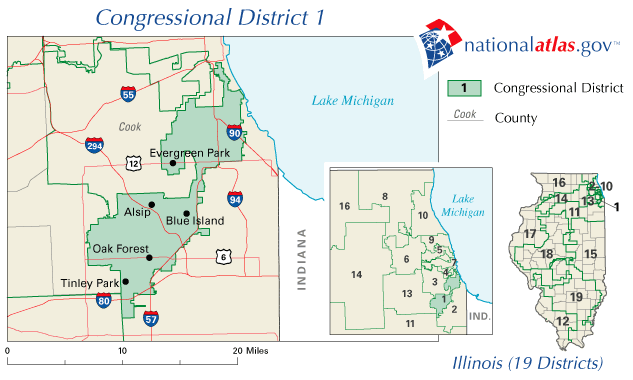
Illinois's 1st congressional district in 2010

In 2010 the 1st district included parts of Blue Island, Chicago, Oak Forest, Orland Park and Tinley Park. The district's population was 63 percent black, 26 percent white and 8 percent Hispanic (see Race and ethnicity in the United States census); 83 percent were high school graduates and 21 percent had received a bachelor's degree or higher. Its median income was $42,727. In the 2008 presidential election the district gave 87 percent of its vote to Democratic nominee Barack Obama and 13 percent to Republican nominee John McCain.

Democrat Bobby Rush, who took office in 1993, was the incumbent. Rush was re-elected with 86 percent of the vote in 2008. In 2010 his opponent in the general election was Republican nominee Ray Wardingley, a retired entertainer. Green Party nominee Jeff Adams also ran. Harold Bailey, a manager for the Chicago Park District; Joanne Guillemette, an attorney; and Fred Smith, a program director at Maryville Academy, also sought the Democratic nomination. Adams was unopposed for the Green nomination.

Rush raised $532,447 and spent $555,188. Rush was re-elected with 80 percent of the vote to Wardingley's 16 percent. Rush was again re-elected in 2012, 2014, 2016 and 2018.

=== Democratic primary results ===
Illinois's 1st district Democratic primary, February 2, 2010
Party	Candidate	Votes	%
Democratic	Bobby Rush (incumbent)	68,585	79.70
Democratic	Joanne Guillemette	8,035	9.34
Democratic	Fred Smith	5,203	6.05
Democratic	Harold Bailey	4,232	4.92
Total votes		86,055	100.00

==== Predictions ====
Source	Ranking	As of
The Cook Political Report	Safe D	November 1, 2010
Rothenberg	Safe D	November 1, 2010
Sabato's Crystal Ball	Safe D	November 1, 2010
RCP	Safe D	November 1, 2010
CQ Politics	Safe D	October 28, 2010
New York Times	Safe D	November 1, 2010
FiveThirtyEight	Safe D	November 1, 2010

=== General election results ===
Illinois's 1st district general election, November 2, 2010
Party	Candidate	Votes	%
Democratic	Bobby Rush (incumbent)	148,170	80.36
Republican	Ray Wardingley	29,253	15.87
Green	Jeff Adams	6,963	3.78
Total votes		184,386	100.00
Democratic hold			

== District 2 ==
2010 Illinois's 2nd congressional district election
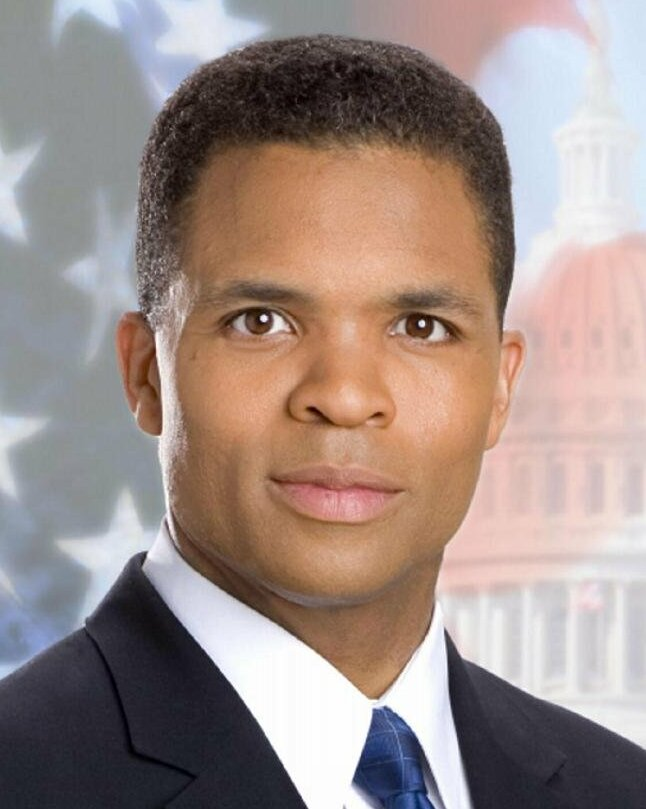

Nominee	Jesse Jackson, Jr.	Isaac Hayes	Anthony Williams
Party	Democratic	Republican	Green
Popular vote	150,666	25,883	10,564
Percentage	80.5%	13.8%	5.7%
- County results Jackson: 80–90%
U.S. Representative before election
Jesse Jackson, Jr.
Democratic
Elected U.S. Representative
Jesse Jackson, Jr.
Democratic

The 2nd district included Calumet City, Chicago Heights and part of Chicago. The district's population was 68 percent black, 18 percent white and 13 percent Hispanic (see Race and ethnicity in the United States census); 83 percent were high school graduates and 21 percent had received a bachelor's degree or higher. Its median income was $45,930. In the 2008 presidential election the district gave 90 percent of its vote to Democratic nominee Barack Obama and 10 percent to Republican nominee John McCain.

Democrat Jesse Jackson, Jr., who took office in 1995, was the incumbent. Jackson was re-elected with 89 percent of the vote in 2008. In 2010 Jackson's opponent in the general election was Republican nominee Isaac Hayes, an associate minister at the Apostolic Church of God. Green Party nominee Anthony Williams also ran. Jackson and Hayes were unopposed in their respective primaries. Michael Mayden also sought the Green nomination.

Jackson raised $795,723 and spent $1,032,506. Hayes raised $74,664 and spent $62,282. Prior to the election FiveThirtyEight's forecast gave Jackson a 100 percent chance of winning, and projected that he would receive 77 percent of the vote to Hayes's 20 percent. On election day Jackson was re-elected with 81 percent of the vote to Hayes's 14 percent, while Williams received 6 percent. Jackson was again re-elected in November 2012, but resigned from Congress the same month following ethics investigations and a diagnosis of mental illness. He was succeeded by fellow Democrat Robin Kelly.

=== Green primary results ===
Illinois's 2nd district Green primary, February 2, 2010
Party	Candidate	Votes	%
Green	Anthony Williams	128	59.81
Green	Michael Mayden	86	40.19
Total votes		214	100.00

==== Predictions ====
Source	Ranking	As of
The Cook Political Report	Safe D	November 1, 2010
Rothenberg	Safe D	November 1, 2010
Sabato's Crystal Ball	Safe D	November 1, 2010
RCP	Safe D	November 1, 2010
CQ Politics	Safe D	October 28, 2010
New York Times	Safe D	November 1, 2010
FiveThirtyEight	Safe D	November 1, 2010

=== General election results ===
Illinois's 2nd district general election, November 2, 2010
Party	Candidate	Votes	%
Democratic	Jesse Jackson Jr. (incumbent)	150,666	80.52
Republican	Isaac Hayes	25,883	13.83
Green	Anthony Williams	10,564	5.65
Total votes		187,113	100.00
Democratic hold			

=== See also ===
- Electoral history of Jesse Jackson, Jr.

== District 3 ==
2010 Illinois's 3rd congressional district election
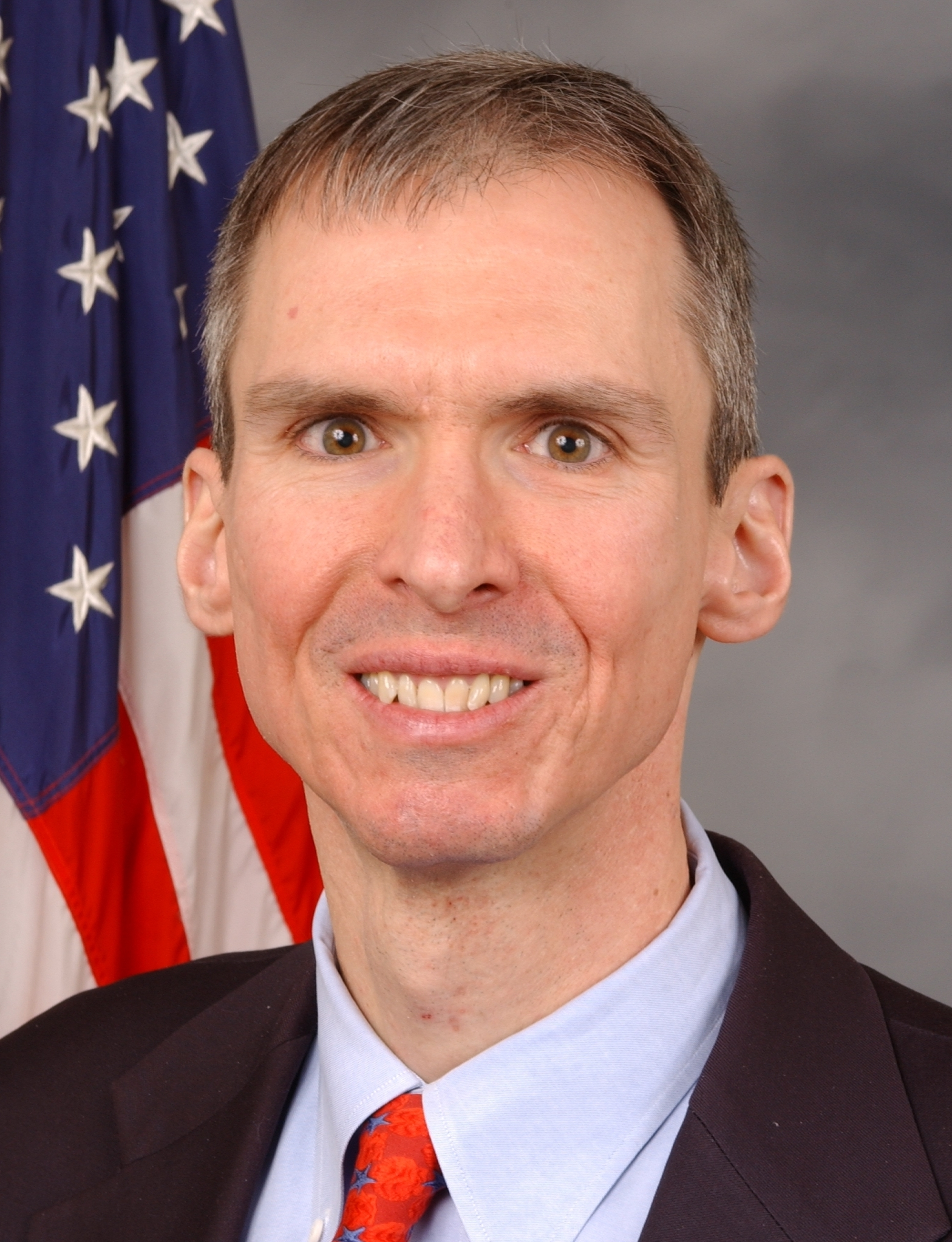

Nominee	Dan Lipinski	Michael A. Bendas	Laurel Lambert Schmidt
Party	Democratic	Republican	Green
Popular vote	116,120	40,479	10,028
Percentage	69.7%	24.3%	6.0%
- County results Lipinski: 60–70%
U.S. Representative before election
Dan Lipinski
Democratic
Elected U.S. Representative
Dan Lipinski
Democratic

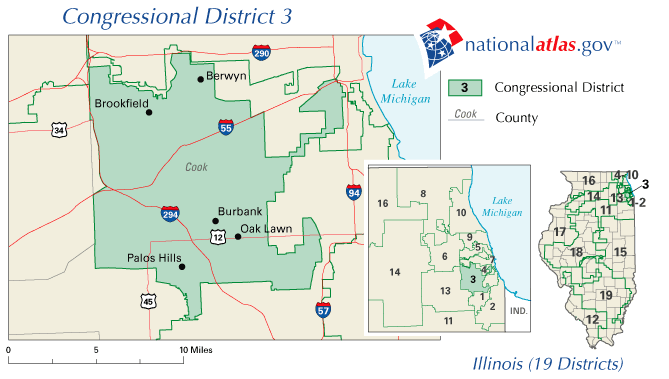
Illinois's 3rd congressional district in 2010

The 3rd district included Oak Lawn and parts of Berwyn and Chicago. The district's population was 58 percent white, 31 percent Hispanic and 6 percent black (see Race and ethnicity in the United States census); 81 percent were high school graduates and 23 percent had received a bachelor's degree or higher. Its median income was $56,296. In the 2008 presidential election the district gave 64 percent of its vote to Democratic nominee Barack Obama and 35 percent to Republican nominee John McCain.

Democrat Dan Lipinski, who took office in 2005, was the incumbent. Lipinski was re-elected with 73 percent of the vote in 2008. In 2010 Lipinski's opponent in the general election was Republican nominee Michael A. Bendas, a retired Colonel in the U.S. Army Reserve. Green Party nominee Laurel Lambert Schmidt, a peace activist, also ran. Jorge Mujica, a community activist and former journalist, also sought the Democratic nomination. Bendas and Lambert Schmidt were unopposed in their respective primaries.

Lipinski raised $752,199 and spent $455,329. Bendas raised $28,807 and spent $39,962. Mujica raised $12,668 and spent the same amount.

On election day Lipinski was re-elected with 70 percent of the vote to Bendas's 24 percent. Lipinski was again re-elected in 2012, 2014, 2016 and 2018.

=== Democratic primary results ===
Illinois's 3rd district Democratic primary, February 2, 2010
Party	Candidate	Votes	%
Democratic	Dan Lipinski (incumbent)	57,684	77.89
Democratic	Jorge Mujica	16,372	22.11
Total votes		74,056	100.00

==== Predictions ====
Source	Ranking	As of
The Cook Political Report	Safe D	November 1, 2010
Rothenberg	Safe D	November 1, 2010
Sabato's Crystal Ball	Safe D	November 1, 2010
RCP	Safe D	November 1, 2010
CQ Politics	Safe D	October 28, 2010
New York Times	Safe D	November 1, 2010
FiveThirtyEight	Safe D	November 1, 2010

=== General election results ===
Illinois's 3rd district general election, November 2, 2010
Party	Candidate	Votes	%
Democratic	Dan Lipinski (incumbent)	116,120	69.69
Republican	Michael A. Bendas	40,479	24.29
Green	Laurel Lambert Schmidt	10,028	6.02
Total votes		166,627	100.00
Democratic hold			

== District 4 ==
2010 Illinois's 4th congressional district election
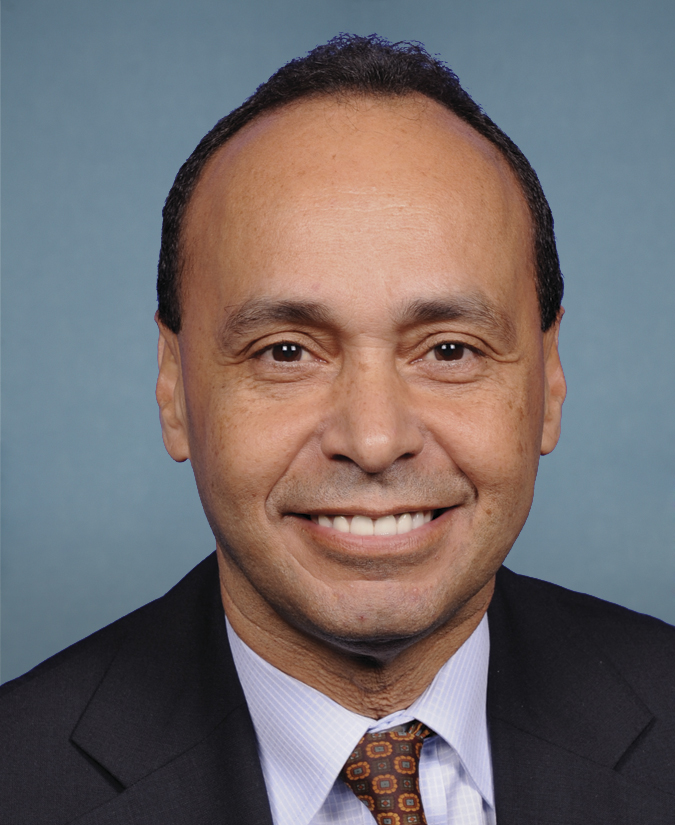

Nominee	Luis Gutiérrez	Israel Vasquez	Robert J. Burns
Party	Democratic	Republican	Green
Popular vote	63,273	11,711	6,808
Percentage	77.4%	14.3%	8.3%
- County results Gutierrez: 70–80%
U.S. Representative before election
Luis Gutiérrez
Democratic
Elected U.S. Representative
Luis Gutiérrez
Democratic

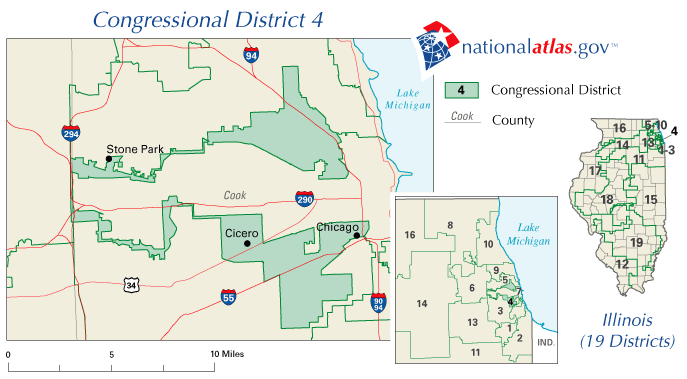
Illinois's 4th congressional district in 2010

The 4th district included parts of Chicago, Cicero and Melrose Park. The district's population was 72 percent Hispanic, 19 percent white and 5 percent black (see Race and ethnicity in the United States census); 62 percent were high school graduates and 20 percent had received a bachelor's degree or higher. Its median income was $42,018. In the 2008 presidential election the district gave 85 percent of its vote to Democratic nominee Barack Obama and 13 percent to Republican nominee John McCain.

Democrat Luis Gutiérrez, who took office in 1993, was the incumbent. Gutiérrez was re-elected with 81 percent of the vote in 2008. In 2010 Gutiérrez's opponent in the general election was Republican nominee Israel Vasquez, the chief executive officer of Woodman Holdings Asset Management (WHAM). Green Party nominee Robert J. Burns, a software architect, also ran. Gutiérrez and Burns were unopposed in their respective primaries.

Gutiérrez raised $512,939 and spent $378,842. Gutiérrez was re-elected with 77 percent of the vote to Vasquez's 14 percent, while Burns received 8 percent. Gutiérrez was again re-elected in 2012, 2014 and 2016, and retired rather than re-election in 2018. He was succeeded by fellow Democrat Jesús "Chuy" García.

=== Predictions ===
Source	Ranking	As of
The Cook Political Report	Safe D	November 1, 2010
Rothenberg	Safe D	November 1, 2010
Sabato's Crystal Ball	Safe D	November 1, 2010
RCP	Safe D	November 1, 2010
CQ Politics	Safe D	October 28, 2010
New York Times	Safe D	November 1, 2010
FiveThirtyEight	Safe D	November 1, 2010

=== General election results ===
Illinois's 4th district general election, November 2, 2010
Party	Candidate	Votes	%
Democratic	Luis Gutiérrez (incumbent)	63,273	77.36
Republican	Israel Vasquez	11,711	14.32
Green	Robert J. Burns	6,808	8.32
Total votes		81,792	100.00
Democratic hold			

== District 5 ==
2010 Illinois's 5th congressional district election
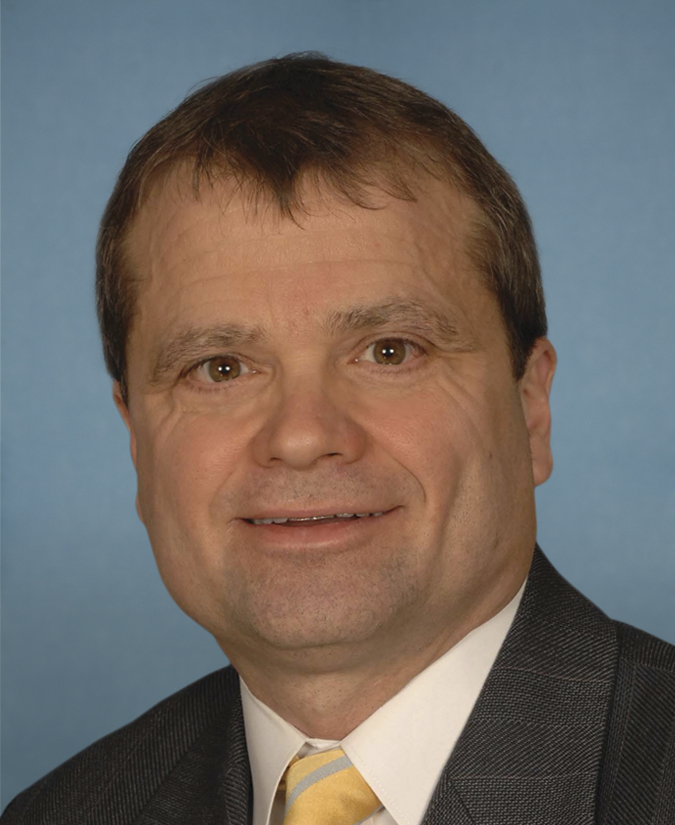

Nominee	Mike Quigley	David Ratowitz
Party	Democratic	Republican
Popular vote	108,360	38,935
Percentage	70.6%	25.4%
- County results Quigley: 70–80%
U.S. Representative before election
Mike Quigley
Democratic
Elected U.S. Representative
Mike Quigley
Democratic

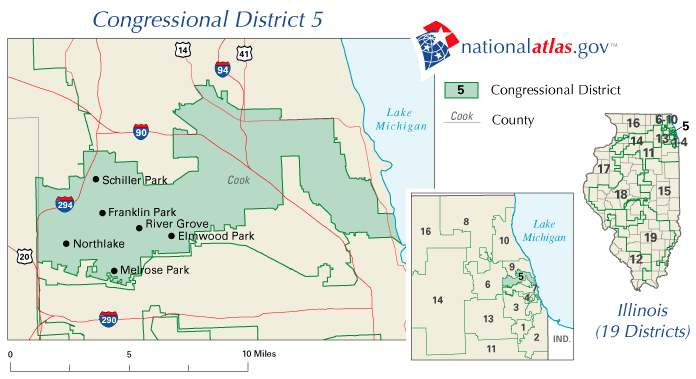
Illinois's 5th congressional district in 2010

The 5th district included parts of Chicago and Elmwood Park. The district's population was 60 percent white, 28 percent Hispanic and 7 percent Asian (see Race and ethnicity in the United States census); 83 percent were high school graduates and 37 percent had received a bachelor's degree or higher. Its median income was $60,427. In the 2008 presidential election the district gave 73 percent of its vote to Democratic nominee Barack Obama and 26 percent to Republican nominee John McCain.

Democrat Mike Quigley, who took office in 2009, was the incumbent. Quigley was elected in a special election in April 2009 with 70 percent of the vote. In 2010 Quigley's opponent in the general election was Republican nominee David Ratowitz, an attorney and activist. Green Party nominee Matthew Reichel also ran. Quigley was unopposed in the Democratic primary. Ashvin Lad, a biomedical engineer; and Rosanna Pulido, an activist and lobbyist, also sought the Republican nomination. Terrence Gilhooly and Andrew Williams, who ran with the intention of highlighting the issue of campaign finance, also sought the Green nomination.

Quigley raised $1,301,374 and spent $1,087,121. Ratowitz raised $64,276 and spent the same amount. Prior to the election FiveThirtyEight's forecast gave Quigley a 100 percent chance of winning and projected that he would receive 69 percent of the vote to Ratowitz's 29 percent. On election day Quigley was re-elected with 71 percent of the vote to Ratowitz's 25 percent. Quigley was again re-elected in 2012, 2014, 2016 and 2018.

=== Republican primary results ===
Illinois's 5th district Republican primary, February 2, 2010
Party	Candidate	Votes	%
Republican	David Ratowitz	5,689	39.64
Republican	Rosanna Pulido	4,722	32.90
Republican	Ashvin Lad	3,942	27.46
Total votes		14,353	100.00

=== Green primary results ===
Illinois's 5th district Green primary, February 2, 2010
Party	Candidate	Votes	%
Green	Matthew Reichel	193	46.17
Green	Andrew Williams	137	32.78
Green	Terrence Gilhooly	88	21.05
Total votes		418	100.00

==== Predictions ====
Source	Ranking	As of
The Cook Political Report	Safe D	November 1, 2010
Rothenberg	Safe D	November 1, 2010
Sabato's Crystal Ball	Safe D	November 1, 2010
RCP	Safe D	November 1, 2010
CQ Politics	Safe D	October 28, 2010
New York Times	Safe D	November 1, 2010
FiveThirtyEight	Safe D	November 1, 2010

=== General election results ===
Illinois's 5th district general election, November 2, 2010
Party	Candidate	Votes	%
Democratic	Mike Quigley (incumbent)	108,360	70.62
Republican	David Ratowitz	38,935	25.38
Green	Matt Reichel	6,140	4.00
Total votes		153,435	100.00
Democratic hold			

== District 6 ==
2010 Illinois's 6th congressional district election
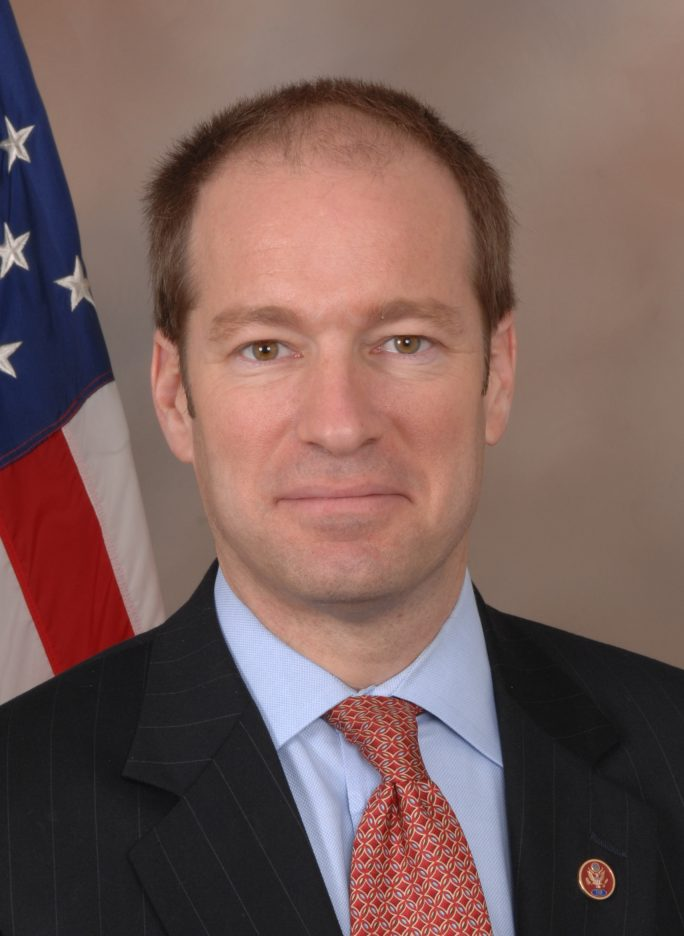

Nominee	Peter Roskam	Ben Lowe
Party	Republican	Democratic
Popular vote	114,456	65,379
Percentage	63.65%	36.35%
- County results Roskam: 60–70%
U.S. Representative before election
Peter Roskam
Republican
Elected U.S. Representative
Peter Roskam
Republican

The 6th district included Addison, Carol Stream, Lombard and parts of Elmhurst, Streamwood and Wheaton. The district's population was 68 percent white, 17 percent Hispanic and 10 percent Asian (see Race and ethnicity in the United States census); 89 percent were high school graduates and 36 percent had received a bachelor's degree or higher. Its median income was $71,058. In the 2008 presidential election the district gave 56 percent of its vote to Democratic Party nominee Barack Obama and 43 percent to Republican Party nominee John McCain.

Republican Peter Roskam, who took office in 2007, was the incumbent. Roskam was re-elected in 2008 with 58 percent of the vote. In 2010 Roskam's opponent in the general election was Democratic nominee Ben Lowe, a local organizer and environmentalist. Roskam and Lowe were unopposed in their respective primaries.

Roskam raised $2,381,858 and spent $1,251,223. Lowe raised $66,632 and spent $63,300. Prior to the election FiveThirtyEight's forecast gave Roskam a 100 percent chance of winning and projected that he would receive 63 percent of the vote to Lowe's 35 percent. On election day Roskam was re-elected with 64 percent of the vote to Lowe's 36 percent. Roskam was again re-elected in 2012, 2014, and 2016, and unsuccessfully sought re-election in 2018. He was succeeded by Democrat Sean Casten.

=== Predictions ===
Source	Ranking	As of
The Cook Political Report	Safe R	November 1, 2010
Rothenberg	Safe R	November 1, 2010
Sabato's Crystal Ball	Safe R	November 1, 2010
RCP	Safe R	November 1, 2010
CQ Politics	Safe R	October 28, 2010
New York Times	Safe R	November 1, 2010
FiveThirtyEight	Safe R	November 1, 2010

=== General election results ===
Illinois's 6th district general election, November 2, 2010
Party	Candidate	Votes	%
Republican	Peter Roskam (incumbent)	114,456	63.65
Democratic	Ben Lowe	65,379	36.35
Total votes		179,835	100.00
Republican hold			

== District 7 ==
2010 Illinois's 7th congressional district election
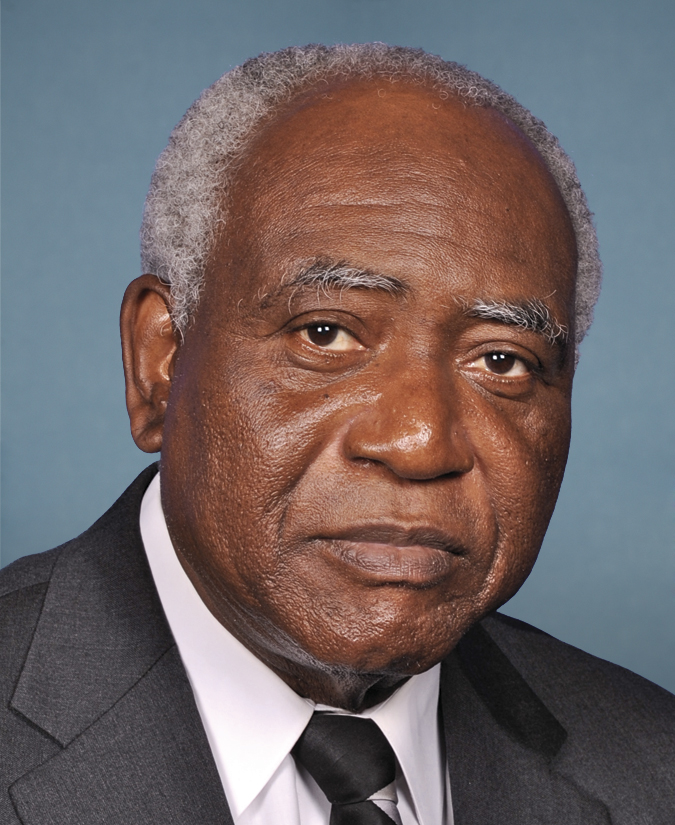

Nominee	Danny K. Davis	Mark Weiman
Party	Democratic	Republican
Popular vote	149,846	29,575
Percentage	81.5%	16.1%
- County results Davis: 80–90%
U.S. Representative before election
Danny K. Davis
Democratic
Elected U.S. Representative
Danny K. Davis
Democratic

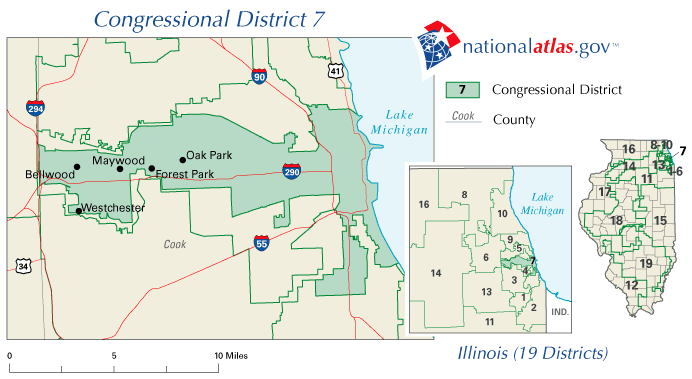
Illinois's 7th congressional district in 2010

The 7th district included Oak Park and parts of Chicago and Maywood. The district's population was 54 percent black, 31 percent white, 8 percent Hispanic and 5 percent Asian (see Race and ethnicity in the United States census); 83 percent were high school graduates and 38 percent had received a bachelor's degree or higher. Its median income was $51,179. In the 2008 presidential election the district gave 88 percent of its vote to Democratic nominee Barack Obama and 12 percent to Republican nominee John McCain.

Democrat Danny K. Davis, who took office in 1997, was the incumbent. Davis was re-elected in 2008 with 85 percent of the vote. Davis said in July 2009 that he would run for the presidency of the Cook County Board of Commissioners; however, later that month Davis said he was prepared to seek re-election to Congress instead; and in November 2009 Davis announced he would seek re-election.

In 2010 Davis's opponent in the general election was Republican nominee Mark Weiman, a dentist. Clarence Clemons, who has worked with Mayor of Chicago Eugene Sawyer and state representative Shirley Jones, ran as an independent candidate. James Ascot, a businessman and real estate agent; Sharon Denise Dixon, a member of the Chicago City Council; and Darlena Williams-Burnett, the chief deputy for the Cook County Recorder of Deeds, also sought the Democratic nomination. State representative Annazette Collins; Chicago City Council member Robert Fioretti; pastor Marshall Hatch; and Rickey Hendon, a member of the Illinois Senate, filed to run in the Democratic primary, but abandoned their campaigns following Davis's announcement that he would seek re-election.

Davis raised $593,861 and spent $864,982. Ascot raised $57,653 and spent the same amount. Dixon raised $35,533 and spent $22,979. Williams-Burnett raised $96,437 and spent $95,712. Hatch raised $20,218 and spent $12,683.

On election day Davis was re-elected with 82 percent of the vote to Weiman's 16 percent. Davis was again re-elected in 2012, 2014, 2016 and 2018.

=== Democratic primary results ===
Illinois's 7th district Democratic primary, February 2, 2010
Party	Candidate	Votes	%
Democratic	Danny K. Davis (incumbent)	52,728	66.77
Democratic	Sharon Denise Dixon	10,851	13.74
Democratic	Darlena Williams-Burnett	10,173	12.88
Democratic	James Ascot	5,221	6.61
Total votes		78,973	100.00

==== Predictions ====
Source	Ranking	As of
The Cook Political Report	Safe D	November 1, 2010
Rothenberg	Safe D	November 1, 2010
Sabato's Crystal Ball	Safe D	November 1, 2010
RCP	Safe D	November 1, 2010
CQ Politics	Safe D	October 28, 2010
New York Times	Safe D	November 1, 2010
FiveThirtyEight	Safe D	November 1, 2010

=== General election results ===
Illinois's 7th district general election, November 2, 2010
Party	Candidate	Votes	%
Democratic	Danny K. Davis (incumbent)	149,846	81.50
Republican	Mark Weiman	29,575	16.09
Independent	Clarence Clemons	4,428	2.41
Total votes		183,849	100.00
Democratic hold			

== District 8 ==
2010 Illinois's 8th congressional district election
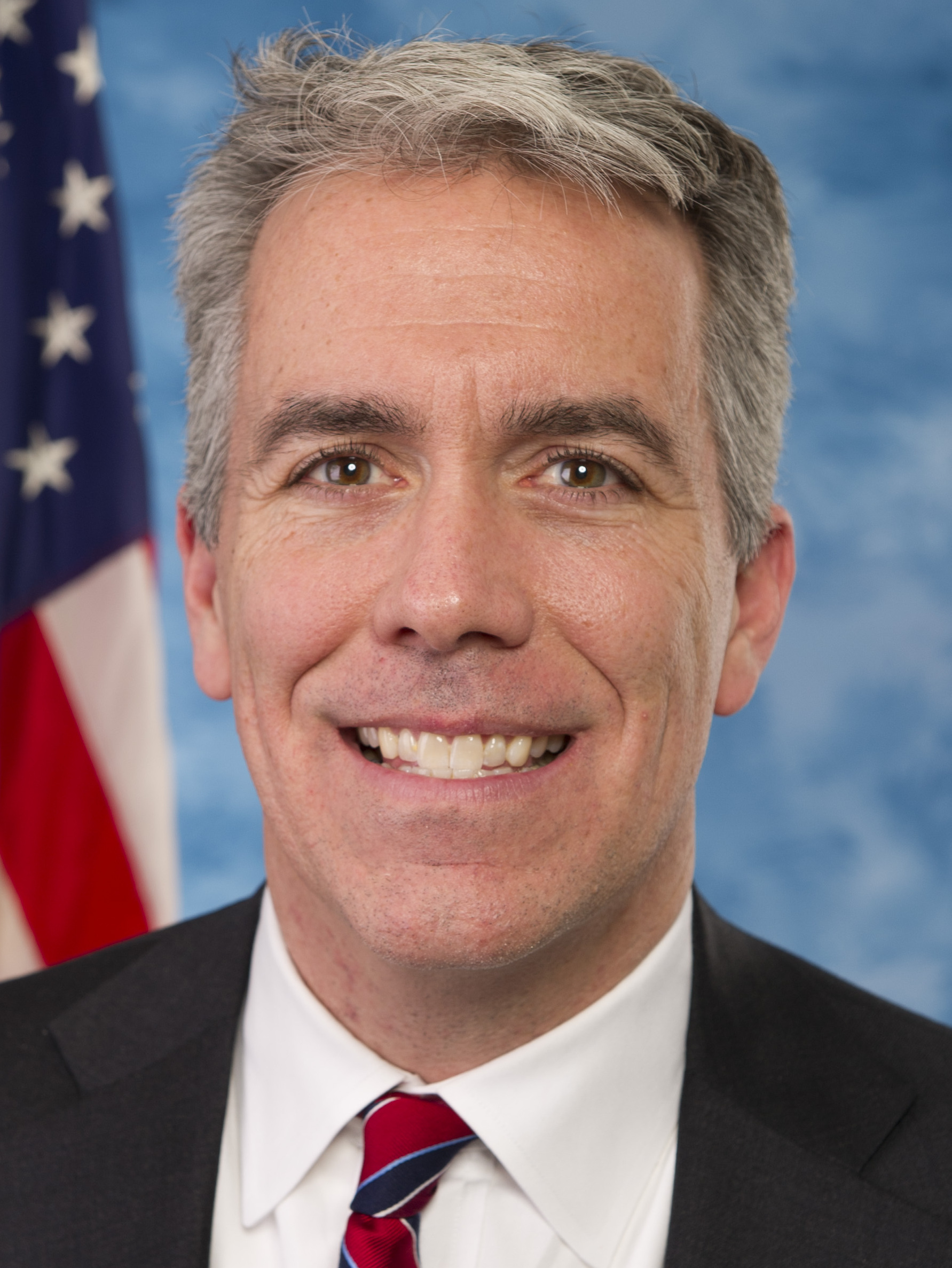

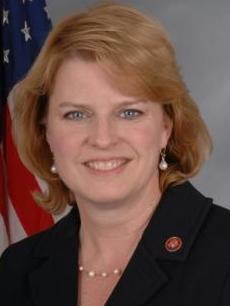
Nominee	Joe Walsh	Melissa Bean
Party	Republican	Democratic
Popular vote	98,115	97,825
Percentage	48.47%	48.32%
- County results Walsh: 40–50% 50–60% Bean: 50–60%
U.S. Representative before election
Melissa Bean
Democratic
Elected U.S. Representative
Joe Walsh
Republican

The 8th district included parts of Hoffman Estates, Palatine and Schaumburg. The district's population was 71 percent white, 16 percent Hispanic and 8 percent Asian (see Race and ethnicity in the United States census); 90 percent were high school graduates and 36 percent had received a bachelor's degree or higher. Its median income was $75,522. In the 2008 presidential election the district gave 56 percent of its vote to Democratic nominee Barack Obama and 43 percent to Republican nominee John McCain.

Democrat Melissa Bean, who took office in 2005, was the incumbent. Bean was re-elected in 2008 with 61 percent of the vote. In 2010 Bean's opponent in the general election was Republican nominee Joe Walsh, a venture capitalist. Green Party nominee Bill Scheurer, a businessman, also ran.

Jonathan Farnick, a computer consultant who ran as a write-in candidate, also sought the Democratic nomination. Dirk Beveridge, a business owner; John Dawson, a former member of the Crystal Lake High School District 155 school board; Chris Geissler, a manager with a consulting firm; Greg Jacobs, a retired deputy in the Cook County Sheriff's Office; and Maria Rodriguez, the mayor of Long Grove, also sought the Republican nomination. Scheurer was unopposed in the Green primary.

In March 2010 Walsh acknowledged having owned a condominium which went into foreclosure in 2008 and from which he was evicted in 2009. Walsh said the "experience helped [him] gain a better appreciation for the very real economic anxieties felt by 8th District families". Walsh came under further scrutiny in May 2010 after an email was sent to supporters by two former campaign aides questioning his veracity with regard to his personal income and campaign finances. Pat Brady, the chair of the Illinois Republican Party, said "questions have been raised and [Walsh] needs to provide satisfactory answers to those questions." Walsh was also sued by his former campaign manager for allegedly unpaid compensation, and was penalized by the U.S. House for failing to file disclosure reports. Later in May, Brady and other party leaders met with Walsh to determine his viability as a nominee. Following the meeting Brady said Walsh "is our nominee and we support him", while Walsh's campaign manager said "everything is moving forward".

Bean raised $2,292,879 and spent $2,451,348. Walsh raised $624,694 and spent $602,803. Beveridge raised $232,669 and spent $231,639. Geissler raised $36,572 and spent $32,788. Rodriguez raised $132,347 and spent the same amount.

In a poll of 827 likely voters, conducted by We Ask America (WAA) on February 18, 2010, Bean and Walsh had the support of 38 percent of respondents apiece, while 4 percent supported Scheurer and 20 percent were unsure. A poll of 1,381 registered voters, conducted by WAA on September 28, 2010, found Bean and Walsh tied again, with the support of 41 percent of respondents each. In WAA a poll of 773 likely voters conducted on October 31, 2010, 49 percent of respondents supported Walsh, while 46 percent favored Bean and Scheurer had the support of 6 percent.

On election day, Walsh was elected with 48.5 percent of the vote to Bean's 48.3 percent. Walsh declared victory the next day. The final votes were tallied on November 16; Bean conceded that night. This was the closest House race in 2010. In 2013 RealClearPolitics named the result as one of the "top 10 upsets" of the 2010 elections. Walsh unsuccessfully sought re-election in 2012 and was succeeded by Democrat Tammy Duckworth.

=== Democratic primary results ===
Illinois's 8th district Democratic primary, February 2, 2010
Party	Candidate	Votes	%
Democratic	Melissa Bean (incumbent)	25,000	99.90
Democratic	Jonathan Farnick	25	0.10
Total votes		25,025	100.00

=== Republican primary results ===
Illinois's 8th district Republican primary, February 2, 2010
Party	Candidate	Votes	%
Republican	Joe Walsh	16,162	34.16
Republican	Dirk Beveridge	11,708	24.75
Republican	Maria Rodriguez	9,803	20.72
Republican	Chris Geissler	4,267	9.02
Republican	John Dawson	3,921	8.29
Republican	Greg Jacobs	1,445	3.05
Total votes		47,306	100.00

==== Predictions ====
Source	Ranking	As of
The Cook Political Report	Likely D	November 1, 2010
Rothenberg	Safe D	November 1, 2010
Sabato's Crystal Ball	Likely D	November 1, 2010
RCP	Lean D	November 1, 2010
CQ Politics	Safe D	October 28, 2010
New York Times	Lean D	November 1, 2010
FiveThirtyEight	Likely D	November 1, 2010

=== General election results ===
Illinois's 8th district general election, November 2, 2010
Party	Candidate	Votes	%
Republican	Joe Walsh	98,115	48.47
Democratic	Melissa Bean (incumbent)	97,825	48.32
Green	Bill Scheurer	6,495	3.21
Total votes		202,435	100.0
Republican gain from Democratic			

=== External links ===
==== Further reading ====
- Sroka, Diana (November 11, 2010). "Breaking down how Joe Walsh turned tide vs. Melissa Bean". Northwest Herald. Archived from the original on August 27, 2019.

== District 9 ==
2010 Illinois's 9th congressional district election
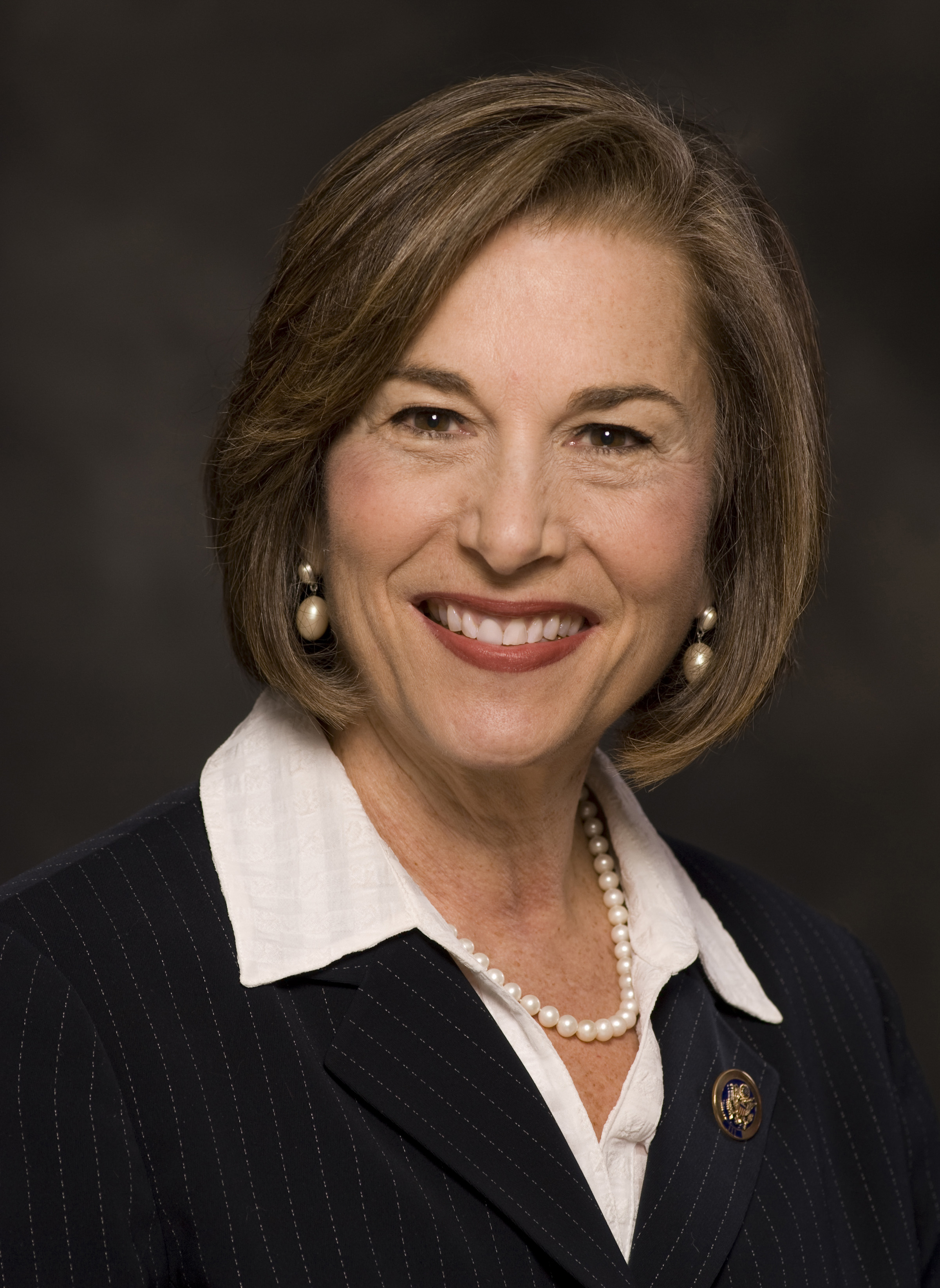

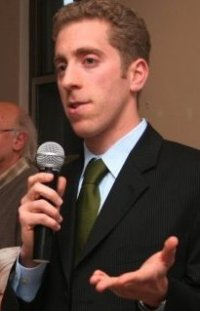
Nominee	Jan Schakowsky	Joel Pollak
Party	Democratic	Republican
Popular vote	117,553	55,182
Percentage	66.3%	31.1%
- County results Schakowsky: 60–70%
U.S. Representative before election
Jan Schakowsky
Democratic
Elected U.S. Representative
Jan Schakowsky
Democratic

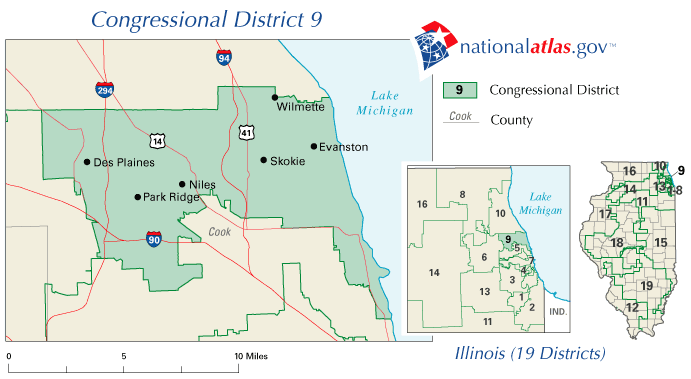
Illinois's 9th congressional district in 2010

The 9th district included Evanston, Niles, Park Ridge, Skokie and parts of Chicago and Des Plaines. The district's population was 62 percent white, 13 percent Asian, 12 percent Hispanic and 10 percent black (see Race and ethnicity in the United States census); 87 percent were high school graduates and 43 percent had received a bachelor's degree or higher. Its median income was $56,413. In the 2008 presidential election the district gave 72 percent of its vote to Democratic nominee Barack Obama and 26 percent to Republican nominee John McCain.

Democrat Jan Schakowsky, who took office in 1999, was the incumbent. Schakowsky was re-elected in 2008 with 75 percent of the vote. In June 2009 Schakowsky announced she would seek re-election rather than running for the U.S. Senate. In 2010 Schakowsky's opponent in the general election was Republican nominee Joel Pollak, a journalist and author. Green Party nominee Simon Ribeiro, a schoolteacher, also ran. Schakowsky and Pollak were unopposed in their respective primaries. Morris Shanfield, a retired journalist and peace activist, also sought the Green nomination.

Schakowsky raised $1,520,106 and spent $1,633,678. Pollak raised $677,066 and spent $703,272. A poll of 945 likely voters, conducted by Magellan Data and Mapping Strategies on October 12, 2010, and released by Pollak's campaign, 48 percent of respondents supported Schakowsky while 30 percent favored Pollak.

Prior to the election FiveThirtyEight's forecast gave Schakowsky a 100 percent chance of winning and projected that she would receive 64 percent of the vote to Pollak's 32 percent. On election day, Schakowsky was re-elected with 66 percent of the vote to Pollak's 31 percent. Schakowsky was again re-elected in 2012, 2014, 2016 and 2018.

=== Green primary results ===
Illinois's 9th district Green primary, February 2, 2010
Party	Candidate	Votes	%
Green	Simon Ribeiro	191	56.51
Green	Morris Shanfield	147	43.49
Total votes		337	100.00

==== Predictions ====
Source	Ranking	As of
The Cook Political Report	Safe D	November 1, 2010
Rothenberg	Safe D	November 1, 2010
Sabato's Crystal Ball	Safe D	November 1, 2010
RCP	Safe D	November 1, 2010
CQ Politics	Safe D	October 28, 2010
New York Times	Safe D	November 1, 2010
FiveThirtyEight	Safe D	November 1, 2010

=== General election results ===
Illinois's 10th district general election, November 2, 2010
Party	Candidate	Votes	%
Democratic	Jan Schakowsky (incumbent)	117,553	66.34
Republican	Joel Pollak	55,182	31.14
Green	Simon Ribeiro	4,472	2.52
Total votes		177,207	100.00
Democratic hold			

== District 10 ==
2010 Illinois's 10th congressional district election
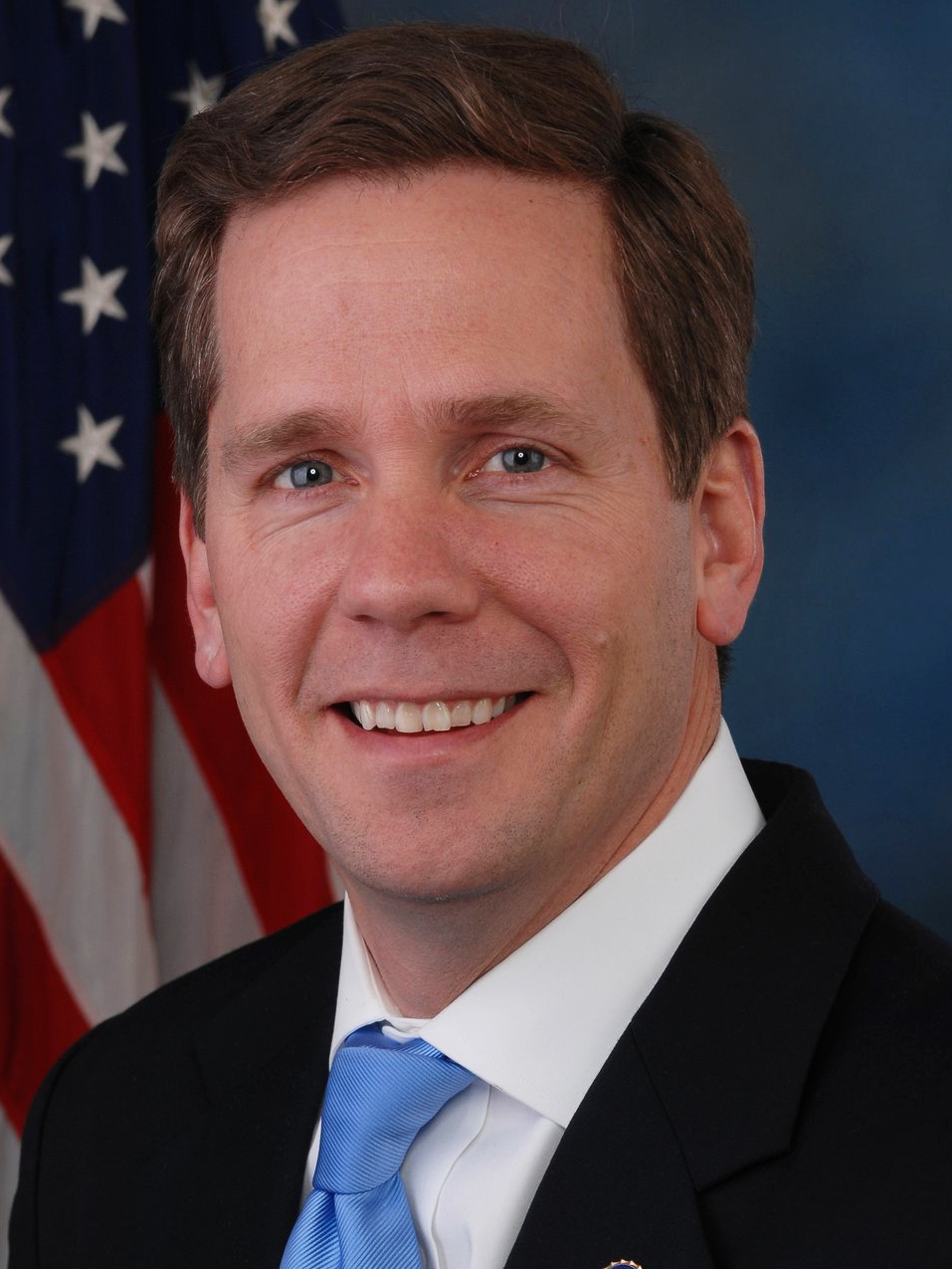

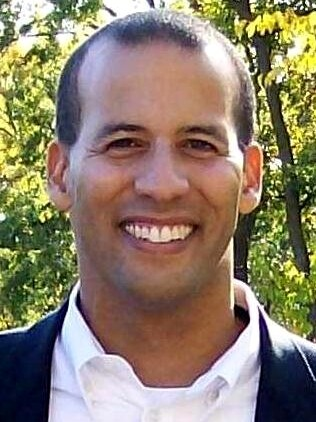
Nominee	Bob Dold	Dan Seals
Party	Republican	Democratic
Popular vote	109,941	105,290
Percentage	51.1%	48.9%
- County results Dold: 50–60% Seals: 50–60%
U.S. Representative before election
Mark Kirk
Republican
Elected U.S. Representative
Bob Dold
Republican

The 10th district included Buffalo Grove and parts of Arlington Heights and Waukegan. The district's population was 71 percent white, 15 percent Hispanic, 8 percent Asian and 5 percent black (see Race and ethnicity in the United States census); 90 percent were high school graduates and 51 percent had received a bachelor's degree or higher. Its median income was $85,468. In the 2008 presidential election the district gave 61 percent of its vote to Democratic nominee Barack Obama and 38 percent to Republican nominee John McCain.

Republican Mark Kirk, who took office in 2001, was the incumbent. Kirk was re-elected in 2008 with 53 percent of the vote. In 2010 Kirk ran for the U.S. Senate rather than seeking re-election. The candidates in the general election were Republican nominee Bob Dold, who at the time ran his family business; and Democratic nominee Dan Seals, a social worker.

Elizabeth Coulson, a member of the Illinois House of Representatives; Arie Friedman, a pediatrician; Dick Green, a businessman; and Paul Hamann, an options trader, also sought the Republican nomination. William Cadigan, an attorney, ended his campaign for the Republican nomination in December 2009. Julie Hamos, a member of the state House of Representatives; and Elliot Richardson, an attorney, also sought the Democratic nomination. In a poll of the Democratic primary by Anzalone Liszt Research for Seals's campaign, the results of which were published in August 2009, 63 percent of respondents supported Seals, while 8 percent favored Hamos and 2 percent chose Richardson. Michael Bond, a member of the Illinois Senate; and Milton Sumption, a businessman ended their respective campaigns for the Democratic nomination in December 2009. Susan Garrett, also a Democratic member of the state Senate, said in the same month that she had decided not to run. Richard B. Mayers, an unemployed admitted anti-Semite, sought the Green Party nomination but was removed from the ballot in November 2009 after failing to submit enough valid signatures.

Dold raised $2,985,088 and spent $2,903,831. Seals raised $2,935,284 and spent $2,941,677. Coulson raised $525,640 and spent the same amount. Friedman raised $53,114 and spent $52,991. Green raised $628,020 and spent the same amount. Hamann raised $4,697 and spent the same amount. Cadigan raised $58,835 and spent the same amount. Hamos raised $1,243,678 and spent the same amount. Richardson raised $342,255 and spent $351,395. Bond raised $86,644 and spent the same amount. Sumption raised $38,602 and spent the same amount.

In a poll of 878 likely voters, conducted on February 18, 2010, by We Ask America (WAA), Seals led with 40 percent to Dold's 37 percent while Mayers received the support of 2 percent. A poll by Anzalone Liszt Research, conducted between May 12 and 17, 2010 with a sample of 502 likely voters, found Seals leading with 46 percent to Dold's 38 percent. In a WAA poll of 1,015 registered voters, conducted on August 4, 2010, 43 percent of respondents supported Seals while 40 percent favored Dold and 17 percent chose another candidate or were undecided. A poll of 500 likely voters, conducted by Anzalone Liszt between August 30 and September 2, 2010, Seals led with 49 percent to Dold's 36 percent. In a poll of 405 likely voters, conducted by The Hill between October 2 and 7, 2010, 49 percent of respondents intended to vote for Seals, while 37 percent supported Dold and 11 percent were undecided. A poll of 1,148 likely voters, conducted by WAA on October 15, 2010, found Dold leading with 50 percent to Seals's 39 percent, while 11 percent were undecided. In a WAA poll of 861 likely voters, conducted on October 31, 2010, Dold led with 54 percent to Seals's 46 percent.

On election day, Dold was elected with 51 percent of the vote to Seals's 49 percent. In May 2011, Seals was appointed as the assistant director of the Illinois Department of Commerce and Economic Opportunity. Dold unsuccessfully sought re-election in 2012 and was succeeded by Democrat Brad Schneider. Dold successfully challenged Schneider in 2014 to regain the seat, but unsuccessfully sought re-election in 2016 and was again succeeded by Schneider.

=== Republican primary results ===
Illinois's 10th district Republican primary, February 2, 2010
Party	Candidate	Votes	%
Republican	Bob Dold	19,691	38.03
Republican	Elizabeth Coulson	16,149	31.19
Republican	Dick Green	7,595	14.67
Republican	Arie Friedman	7,260	14.02
Republican	Paul Hamann	1,078	2.08
Total votes		51,773	100.00

=== Democratic primary results ===
Illinois's 10th district Democratic primary, February 2, 2010
Party	Candidate	Votes	%
Democratic	Dan Seals	25,490	48.22
Democratic	Julie Hamos	24,531	46.41
Democratic	Elliot Richardson	2,838	5.37
Total votes		52,859	100.00

==== Predictions ====
Source	Ranking	As of
The Cook Political Report	Lean D (flip)	November 1, 2010
Rothenberg	Tilt D (flip)	November 1, 2010
Sabato's Crystal Ball	Lean D (flip)	November 1, 2010
RCP	Tossup	November 1, 2010
CQ Politics	Lean D (flip)	October 28, 2010
New York Times	Lean D (flip)	November 1, 2010
FiveThirtyEight	Lean D (flip)	November 1, 2010

=== General election results ===
Illinois's 10th district general election, November 2, 2010
Party	Candidate	Votes	%
Republican	Bob Dold	109,941	51.08
Democratic	Dan Seals	105,290	48.92
Write-In	Author C. Brumfield	1	0.00
Total votes		215,232	100.00
Republican hold			

== District 11 ==
2010 Illinois's 11th congressional district election
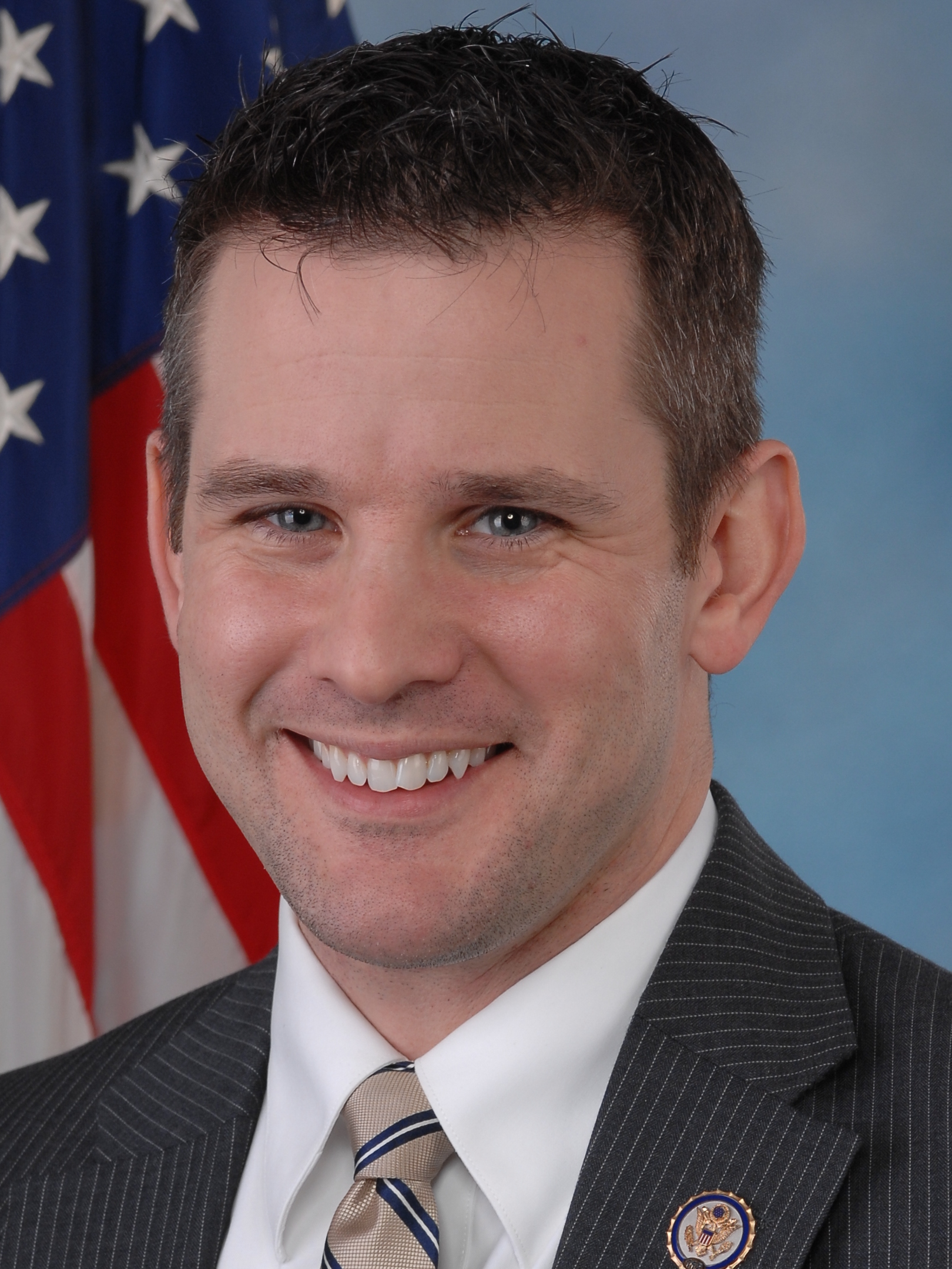

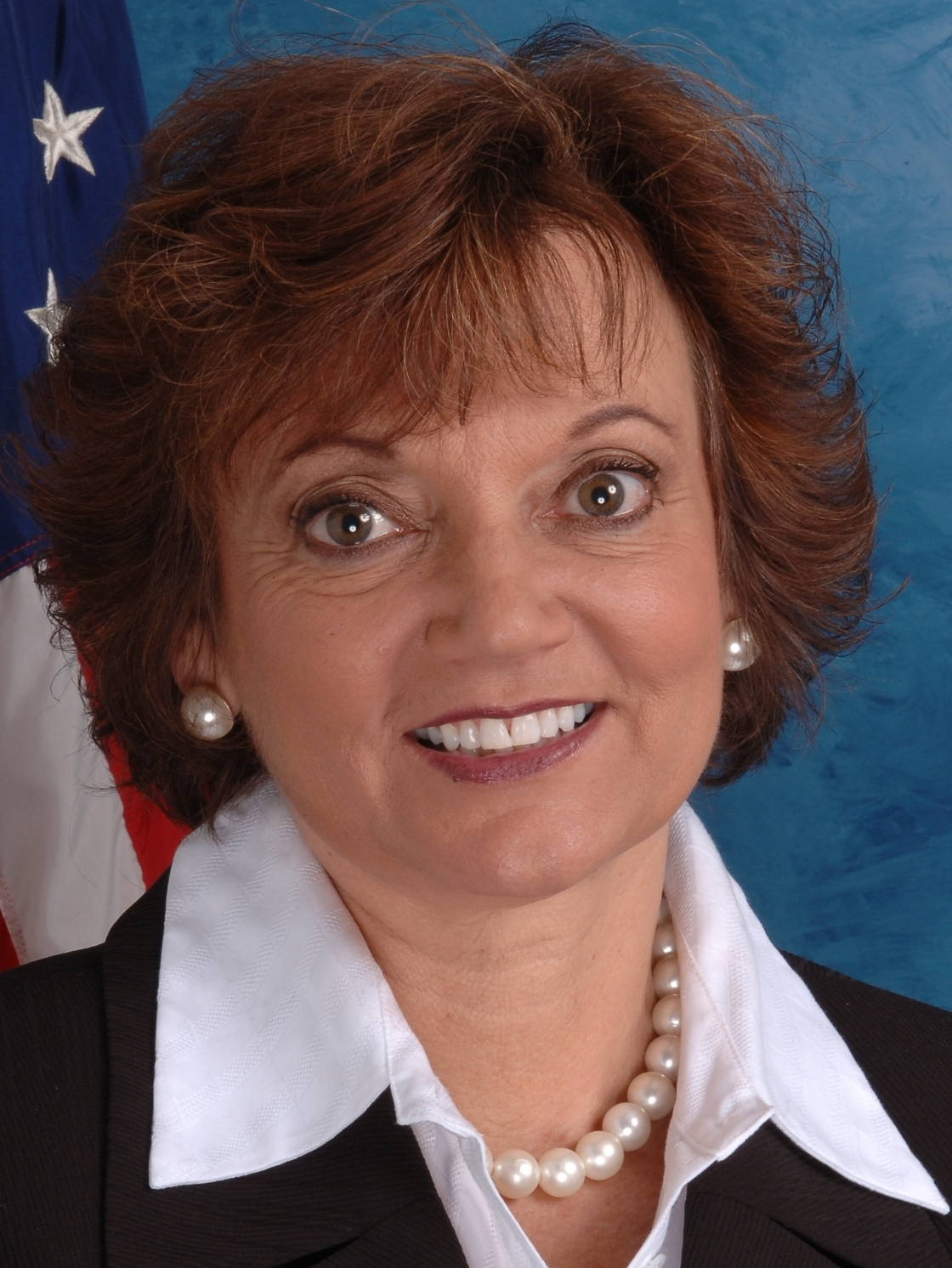
Nominee	Adam Kinzinger	Debbie Halvorson
Party	Republican	Democratic
Popular vote	129,108	96,019
Percentage	57.35%	42.65%
- County results Kinzinger: 50–60% 60–70% 70–80%
U.S. Representative before election
Debbie Halvorson
Democratic
Elected U.S. Representative
Adam Kinzinger
Republican

The 11th district included Kankakee and parts of Bloomington, Joliet and Normal. The district's population was 79 percent white, 10 percent Hispanic and 8 percent black (see Race and ethnicity in the United States census); 88 percent were high school graduates and 21 percent had received a bachelor's degree or higher. Its median income was $58,652. In the 2008 presidential election the district gave 53 percent of its vote to Democratic nominee Barack Obama and 45 percent to Republican nominee John McCain.

Democrat Debbie Halvorson, who took office in 2009, was the incumbent. Halvorson was elected with 58 percent of the vote in 2008. In 2010 Halvorson's opponent in the general election was Republican nominee Adam Kinzinger, a pilot with the Air National Guard. Halvorson was unopposed in the Democratic primary. David McAloon, the television and media producer for Family Harvest Church; Henry Meers Jr., a real estate investor; and Darrel Miller, a self-employed farmer, also sought the Republican nomination. Dave White ended his campaign for the Republican nomination in January 2010, though his name remained on the primary ballot.

Halvorson raised $2,695,432 and spent $2,502,037. Kinzinger raised $1,881,629 and spent $1,827,192. McAloon raised $6,208 and spent $6,301. Meers raised $13,799 and spent $12,896.

In a poll of 804 likely voters, conducted on February 18, 2010, by We Ask America (WAA), 42 percent of respondents supported Kinzinger while 30 percent favored Halvorson and 27 percent were unsure. A poll by Public Opinion Strategies (POS) for Kinzinger's campaign, the results of which were published in March 2010, found Kinzinger leading with 44 percent to Halvorson's 38 percent, while 16 percent were undecided. In a WAA poll of 1,015 registered voters, conducted on August 4, 2010, Kinzinger led with 52 percent to Halvorson's 32 percent, while 17 percent supported other candidates or were unsure. A POS poll of 400 likely voters, the results of which were released in August 2010, found Kinzinger leading with 51 percent to Halvorson's 40 percent. In a poll by The Hill and ANGA, conducted between September 28 and 30, 2010, with a sample of 401 likely voters, 49 percent of respondents backed Kinzinger, while 31 percent supported Halvorson and 18 percent remained undecided. A poll of 500 likely voters, conducted by Anzalone Liszt Research between October 5 and 7, 2010, found Kinzinger leading with 45 percent to Halvorson's 41 percent. A WAA poll of 828 likely voters, conducted on October 31, found Kinzinger leading with 55 percent to Halvorson's 45 percent.

On election day, Kinzinger was elected with 57 percent of the vote to Halvorson's 43 percent. Kinzinger was re-elected in the new 16th district in 2012, 2014, 2016 and 2018. Halvorson unsuccessfully sought the Democratic nomination in a 2013 special election in the 2nd district.

=== Republican primary results ===
Illinois's 11th district Republican primary, February 2, 2010
Party	Candidate	Votes	%
Republican	Adam Kinzinger	32,233	63.67
Republican	Dave White	5,257	10.38
Republican	David McAloon	4,880	9.64
Republican	Henry Meers Jr.	4,555	9.00
Republican	Darrel Miller	3,701	7.31
Total votes		50,626	100.00

==== Predictions ====
Source	Ranking	As of
The Cook Political Report	Lean R (flip)	November 1, 2010
Rothenberg	Likely R (flip)	November 1, 2010
Sabato's Crystal Ball	Lean R (flip)	November 1, 2010
RCP	Likely R (flip)	November 1, 2010
CQ Politics	Likely R (flip)	October 28, 2010
New York Times	Lean R (flip)	November 1, 2010
FiveThirtyEight	Likely R (flip)	November 1, 2010

=== General election results ===
Illinois's 11th district general election, November 2, 2010
Party	Candidate	Votes	%
Republican	Adam Kinzinger	129,108	57.35
Democratic	Debbie Halvorson (incumbent)	96,019	42.65
Total votes		225,127	100.00
Republican gain from Democratic			

=== Further reading ===
- Hall, William K. (2011). "Illinois District 11 Race (Kinzinger v. Halvorson): A Freshman Incumbent Does Not Survive the Tsunami". In Foreman, Sean D.; Dewhirst, Robert (eds.). The Roads to Congress 2010. Lanham, Maryland: Lexington Books. pp. 41–54.

== District 12 ==
2010 Illinois's 12th congressional district election
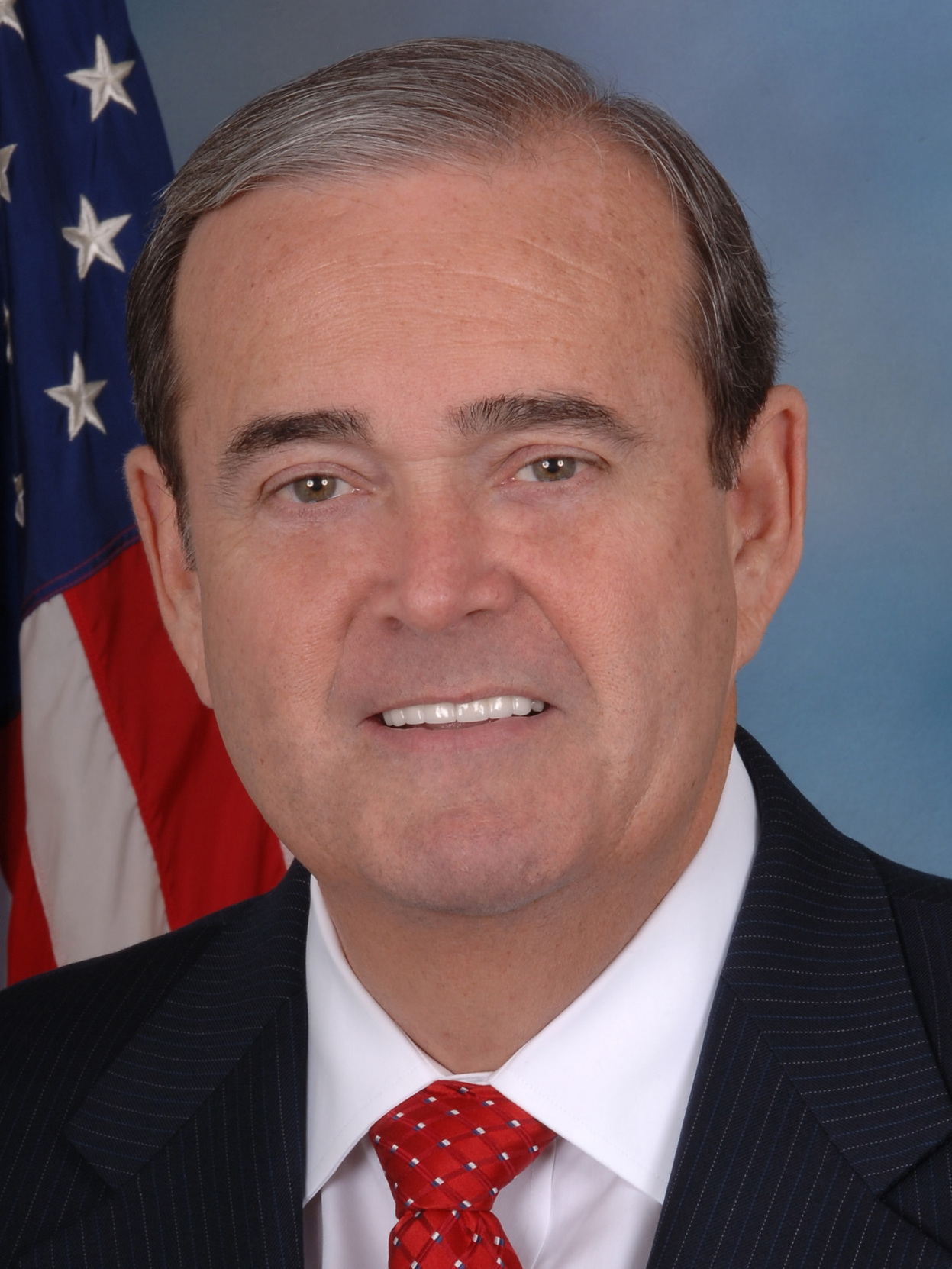

Nominee	Jerry Costello	Teri Newman
Party	Democratic	Republican
Popular vote	121,272	74,046
Percentage	59.8%	36.5%
- County results Costello: 40–50% 50–60% 60–70%
U.S. Representative before election
Jerry Costello
Democratic
Elected U.S. Representative
Jerry Costello
Democratic

The 12th district included Belleville, Carbondale, East St. Louis, Granite City, O'Fallon and part of Alton. The district's population was 78 percent white and 16 percent black (see Race and ethnicity in the United States census); 86 percent were high school graduates and 20 percent had received a bachelor's degree or higher. Its median income was $42,808. In the 2008 presidential election the district gave 56 percent of its vote to Democratic nominee Barack Obama and 43 percent to Republican nominee John McCain.

Democrat Jerry Costello, who took office in 1988, was the incumbent. Costello was re-elected in 2008 with 71 percent of the vote. In 2010 Costello's opponent in the general election was Teri Newman, who previously ran a limousine service business. Green Party nominee Rodger Jennings also ran. Costello and Jennings were unopposed in their respective party primaries. Theresa Kormos, a nurse, also sought the Republican nomination.

Costello raised $1,351,182 and spent $1,420,274. Jennings raised $445 and spent $110. Kormos raised $13,474 and spent the same amount.

Prior to the election FiveThirtyEight's forecast gave Costello a 100 percent chance of winning and projected that he would receive 64 percent of the vote to Newman's 33 percent. On election day Costello was re-elected with 60 percent of the vote to Newman's 37 percent. Costello retired rather than seeking re-election in 2012 and was succeeded by Democrat William Enyart.

=== Republican primary results ===
Illinois's 12th district Republican primary, February 2, 2010
Party	Candidate	Votes	%
Republican	Teri Newman	14,995	52.60
Republican	Theresa Kormos	13,510	47.40
Total votes		28,505	100.00

==== Predictions ====
Source	Ranking	As of
The Cook Political Report	Safe D	November 1, 2010
Rothenberg	Safe D	November 1, 2010
Sabato's Crystal Ball	Safe D	November 1, 2010
RCP	Safe D	November 1, 2010
CQ Politics	Safe D	October 28, 2010
New York Times	Safe D	November 1, 2010
FiveThirtyEight	Safe D	November 1, 2010

=== General election results ===
Illinois's 12th district general election, November 2, 2010
Party	Candidate	Votes	%
Democratic	Jerry Costello (incumbent)	121,272	59.83
Republican	Teri Newman	74,046	36.53
Green	Rodger Jennings	7,387	3.64
Total votes		202,705	100.00
Democratic hold			

== District 13 ==
2010 Illinois's 13th congressional district election
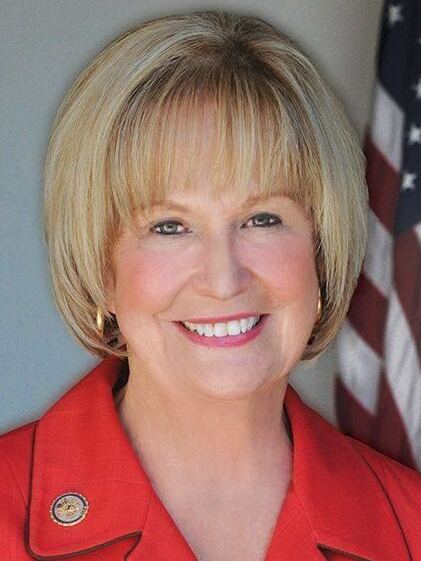

Nominee	Judy Biggert	Scott Harper
Party	Republican	Democratic
Popular vote	152,132	86,281
Percentage	63.8%	36.2%
- County results Biggert: 50–60% 60–70% 70–80%
U.S. Representative before election
Judy Biggert
Republican
Elected U.S. Representative
Judy Biggert
Republican

The 13th district included Bolingbrook and parts of Aurora and Naperville. The district's population was 74 percent white, 10 percent Hispanic, 8 percent Asian and 6 percent black (see Race and ethnicity in the United States census); 93 percent were high school graduates and 46 percent had received a bachelor's degree or higher. Its median income was $84,132. In the 2008 presidential election the district gave 54 percent of its vote to Democratic nominee Barack Obama and 44 percent to Republican nominee John McCain.

Republican Judy Biggert, who took office in 1999, was the incumbent. Biggert was re-elected in 2008 with 54 percent of the vote. In 2010 Biggert's opponent in the general election was Democratic nominee Scott Harper, an adjunct professor at North Central College and former business owner. Biggert and Harper were unopposed in their respective party primaries.

Biggert raised $1,584,517 and spent $1,236,454. Harper raised $648,365 and spent $616,389. In a poll of 400 likely voters, conducted by the Global Strategy Group for Harper's campaign between June 28 and 30, 2010, 55 percent of respondents supported Biggert while 29 percent favored Harper. In a poll by Linda DiVall and Randall Gutermuth for Biggert's campaign, conducted on July 27 and 28, 2010, with a sample size of 400, Biggert led with 61 percent to Harper's 28 percent, while 10 percent were undecided.

Prior to the election FiveThirtyEight's forecast gave Biggert a 99 percent chance of winning and projected that she would receive 59 percent of the vote to Harper's 39 percent. On election day Biggert was re-elected with 64 percent of the vote to Harper's 36 percent. Biggert unsuccessfully sought re-election in 2012 in the new 11th district.

=== Predictions ===
Source	Ranking	As of
The Cook Political Report	Safe R	November 1, 2010
Rothenberg	Safe R	November 1, 2010
Sabato's Crystal Ball	Safe R	November 1, 2010
RCP	Safe R	November 1, 2010
CQ Politics	Safe R	October 28, 2010
New York Times	Safe R	November 1, 2010
FiveThirtyEight	Safe R	November 1, 2010

=== General election results ===
Illinois's 13th district general election, November 2, 2010
Party	Candidate	Votes	%
Republican	Judy Biggert (incumbent)	152,132	63.81
Democratic	Scott Harper	86,281	36.19
Total votes		238,413	100.00
Republican hold			

== District 14 ==
2010 Illinois's 14th congressional district election
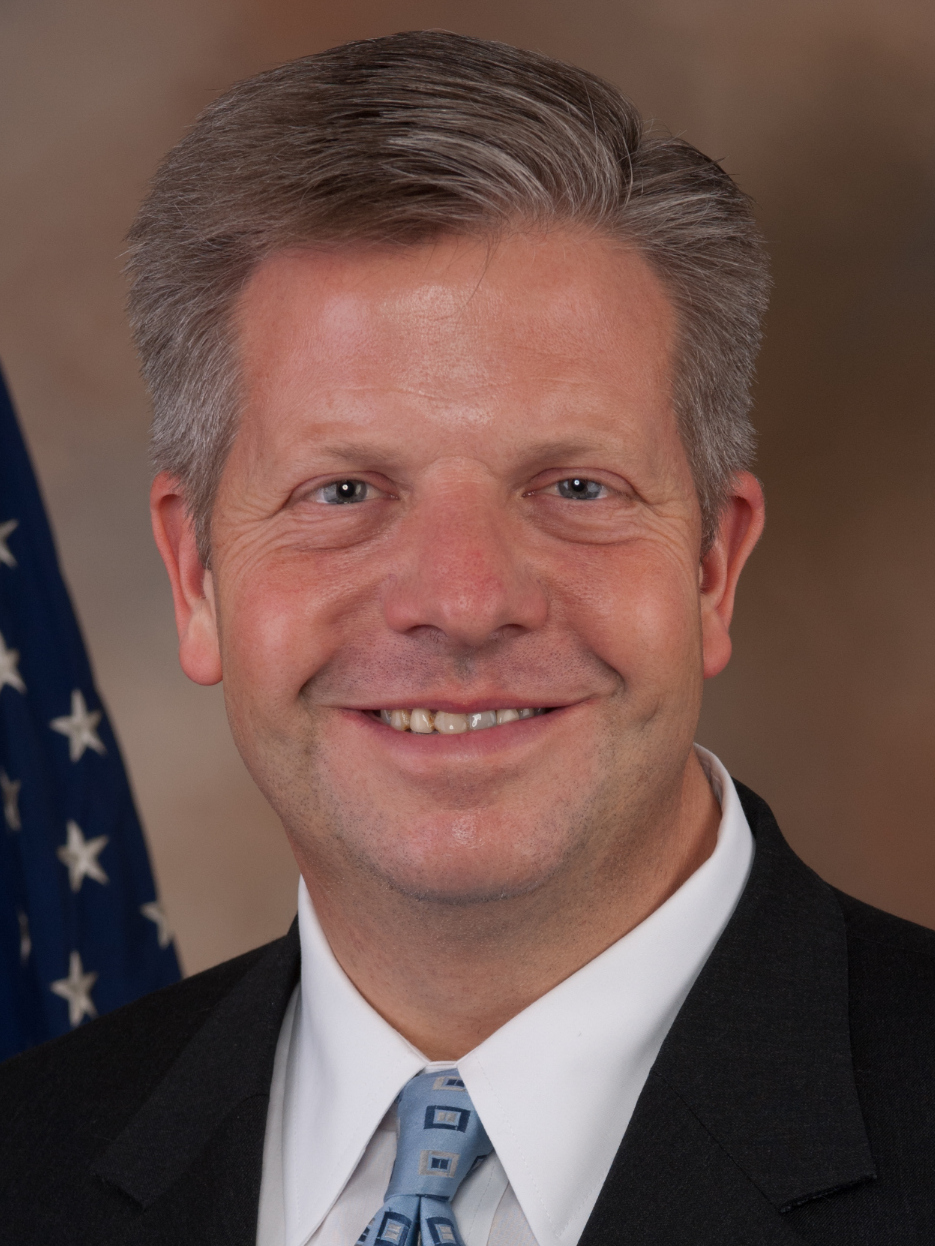

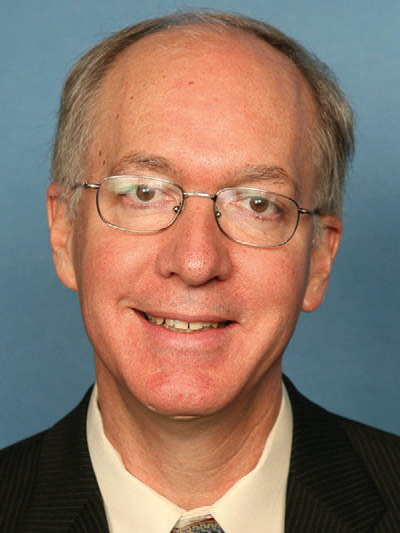
Nominee	Randy Hultgren	Bill Foster
Party	Republican	Democratic
Popular vote	112,369	98,645
Percentage	51.3%	45.0%
- County results Hultgren: 50–60% 60–70% Foster: 50–60%
U.S. Representative before election
Bill Foster
Democratic
Elected U.S. Representative
Randy Hultgren
Republican

The 14th district included Carpentersville, DeKalb and parts of Aurora and Elgin. The district's population was 74 percent white, 10 percent Hispanic, 8 percent Asian and 6 percent black (see Race and ethnicity in the United States census); 93 percent were high school graduates and 46 percent had received a bachelor's degree or higher. Its median income was $84,132. In the 2008 presidential election the district gave 55 percent of its vote to Democratic nominee Barack Obama and 44 percent to Republican nominee John McCain.

Democrat Bill Foster, who was first elected in a March 2008 special election, was the incumbent. Foster was re-elected in November 2008 with 58 percent of the vote. In 2010 Foster's opponent in the general election was Republican nominee Randy Hultgren, a member of the Illinois Senate. Green Party nominee Daniel J Kairis, a substitute teacher, and Doug Marks, who ran as a write-in Libertarian Party candidate, also ran.

Bobby G. Rose also sought the Democratic nomination as a write-in candidate. Ethan Hastert, a lawyer and the son of former Speaker of the House Dennis Hastert, also sought the Republican nomination. Jim Purcell, a businessman, sought the Republican nomination but ended his campaign in December 2009. Jeff Danklefsen, who identified himself as "just a regular guy"; and Mark Vargas, who worked for the United States Department of Defense, both ended their campaigns for the Republican nomination the same month. Bill Cross, a former Aurora alderman, ended his campaign for the Republican nomination in October 2009. Kairis was unopposed in the Green primary.

Foster raised $3,804,082 and spent $3,737,519. Hultgren raised $1,581,719 and spent $1,552,578. Hastert raised $623,686 and spent the same amount. Purcell raised $42,200 and spent $39,384. Danklefsen raised $10,268 and spent $9,118. Vargas raised $8,460 and spent $9,421.

In a poll of 817 likely voters, conducted by We Ask America (WAA) on February 18, 2010, 38 percent of respondents supported Hultgren while 36 percent favored Foster, 5 percent chose Kairis and 21 percent were undecided. A poll of 300 likely voters, conducted by the Tarrance Group for Hultgren's campaign on May 3 and 4, 2010, found Hultgren leading with 45 percent to Foster's 44 percent. A WAA poll of 1,028 registered voters, conducted on August 4, 2010, found Hultgren leading with 44 percent to Foster's 37 percent while 19 percent were undecided. In a poll of 400 likely voters, conducted by the Tarrance Group for Hultgren's campaign on October 3 and 4, 44 percent of respondents backed Hultgren, 38 percent chose Foster, 4 percent supported Kairis and 16 percent were undecided. In a poll of 400 likely voters, conducted by the Benenson Strategy Group between October 4 and 6, 2010, Foster led with 48 percent to Hultgren's 38 percent. A poll of 406 likely voters, conducted by Penn Schoen Berland between October 9 and 12, 2010, found Hultgren leading with 43 percent to Foster's 42 percent, while 12 percent were undecided. In a poll of 784 likely voters, conducted by WAA on October 31, Hultgren led with 50 percent while Foster received 45 percent and Kairis received 4 percent.

On election day, Hultgren was elected with 51 percent of the vote to Foster's 45 percent. Hultgren was re-elected in 2012, 2014, and 2016. He unsuccessfully sought re-election in 2018 and was succeeded by Democrat Lauren Underwood. Foster was elected in the new 11th district in 2012 and re-elected in 2014, 2016 and 2018.

=== Democratic primary results ===
Illinois's 14th district Democratic primary, February 2, 2010
Party	Candidate	Votes	%
Democratic	Bill Foster (incumbent)	25,446	100.00
Democratic	Bobby G. Rose	1	0.00
Total votes		25,447	100.00

=== Republican primary results ===
Illinois's 14th district Republican primary, February 2, 2010
Party	Candidate	Votes	%
Republican	Randy Hultgren	34,833	54.71
Republican	Ethan Hastert	28,840	45.29
Total votes		63,673	100.00

==== Predictions ====
Source	Ranking	As of
The Cook Political Report	Tossup	November 1, 2010
Rothenberg	Tilt R (flip)	November 1, 2010
Sabato's Crystal Ball	Lean R (flip)	November 1, 2010
RCP	Lean R (flip)	November 1, 2010
CQ Politics	Tossup	October 28, 2010
New York Times	Tossup	November 1, 2010
FiveThirtyEight	Tossup	November 1, 2010

=== General election results ===
Illinois's 14th district general election, November 2, 2010
Party	Candidate	Votes	%
Republican	Randy Hultgren	112,369	51.31
Democratic	Bill Foster (incumbent)	98,645	45.04
Green	Daniel J Kairis	7,949	3.63
Write-In	Doug Marks	50	0.02
Total votes		190,139	100
Republican gain from Democratic			

=== Further reading ===
- Ashley, Jeffrey; Whitney, Joshua (2011). "Illinois District 14 Race (Hultgren v. Foster): A National Referendum Against the President and Incumbents". In Foreman, Sean D.; Dewhirst, Robert (eds.). The Roads to Congress 2010. Lanham, Maryland: Lexington Books. pp. 25–40.

== District 15 ==
2010 Illinois's 15th congressional district election
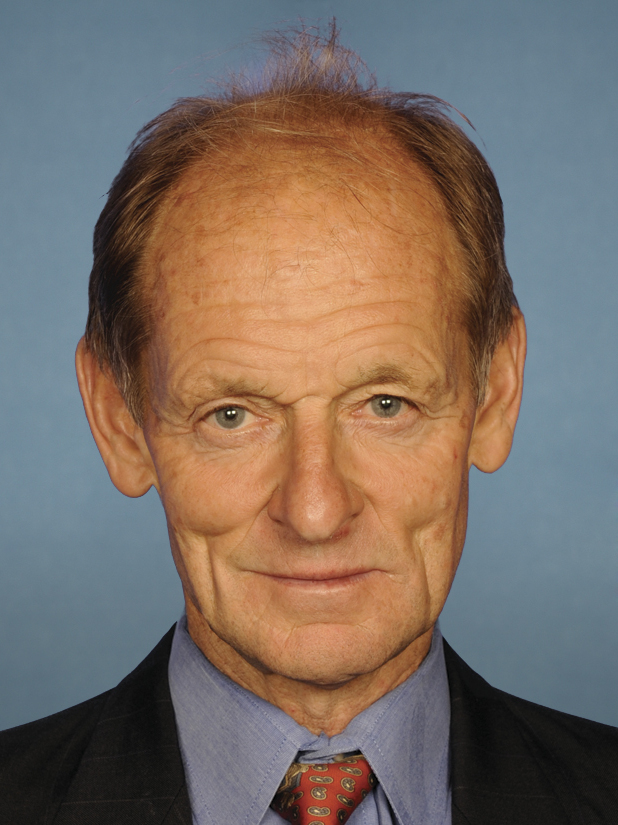

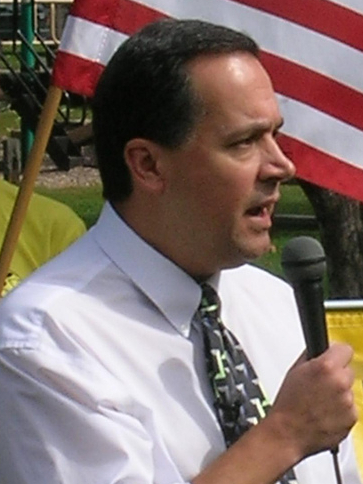
Nominee	Tim Johnson	David Gill
Party	Republican	Democratic
Popular vote	136,915	75,948
Percentage	64.3%	35.7%
- County results Johnson: 50–60% 60–70% 70–80% 80–90%
U.S. Representative before election
Tim Johnson
Republican
Elected U.S. Representative
Tim Johnson
Republican

The 15th district included Champaign, Charleston, Danville, Mattoon, Urbana and parts of Bloomington and Normal. The district's population was 86 percent white and 6 percent black (see Race and ethnicity in the United States census); 89 percent were high school graduates and 27 percent had received a bachelor's degree or higher. Its median income was $46,218. In the 2008 presidential election the district gave 50 percent of its vote to Republican nominee John McCain and 48 percent to Democratic nominee Barack Obama.

Republican Tim Johnson, who took office in 2001, was the incumbent. Johnson was re-elected in 2008 with 64 percent of the vote. In 2010 Johnson's opponent in the general election was Democratic nominee David Gill, who was also the Democratic nominee in 2004 and 2006. Johnson and Gill were unopposed in their respective party primaries.

Johnson raised $342,063 and spent $270,407. Gill raised $145,099 and spent $142,417. Prior to the election FiveThirtyEight's forecast gave Johnson a 100 percent chance of winning and projected that he would receive 63 percent of the vote to Gill's 35 percent. On election day Johnson was re-elected with 64 percent of the vote to Gill's 36 percent. In 2012 Johnson retired rather than seeking re-election, while Gill again ran unsuccessfully as the Democratic nominee.

=== Predictions ===
Source	Ranking	As of
The Cook Political Report	Safe R	November 1, 2010
Rothenberg	Safe R	November 1, 2010
Sabato's Crystal Ball	Safe R	November 1, 2010
RCP	Safe R	November 1, 2010
CQ Politics	Safe R	October 28, 2010
New York Times	Safe R	November 1, 2010
FiveThirtyEight	Safe R	November 1, 2010

=== General election results ===
Illinois's 15th district general election, November 2, 2010
Party	Candidate	Votes	%
Republican	Tim Johnson (incumbent)	136,915	64.32
Democratic	David Gill	75,948	35.68
Total votes		212,863	100.00
Republican hold			

== District 16 ==
2010 Illinois's 16th congressional district election
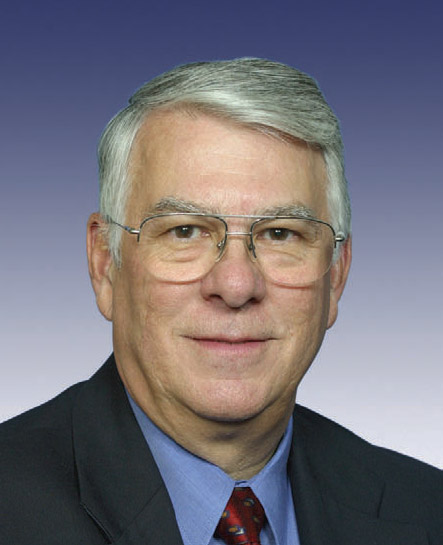

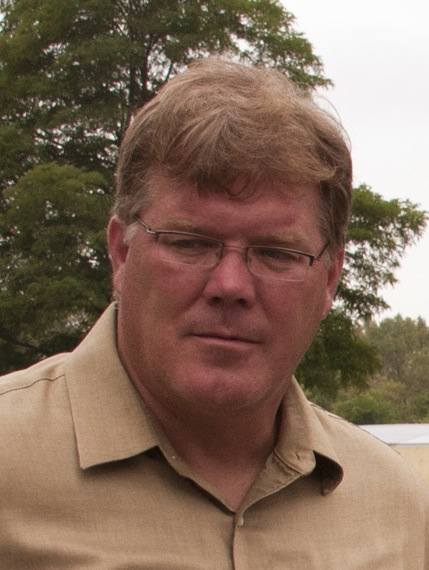
Nominee	Don Manzullo	George Gaulrapp
Party	Republican	Democratic
Popular vote	138,299	66,037
Percentage	65.0%	31.0%
- County results Manzullo: 60–70%
U.S. Representative before election
Don Manzullo
Republican
Elected U.S. Representative
Don Manzullo
Republican

The 16th district included Lake in the Hills, Rockford and part of Crystal Lake. The district's population was 81 percent white, 10 percent Hispanic and 6 percent black (see Race and ethnicity in the United States census); 87 percent were high school graduates and 24 percent had received a bachelor's degree or higher. Its median income was $56,748. In the 2008 presidential election the district gave 53 percent of its vote to Democratic nominee Barack Obama and 46 percent to Republican nominee John McCain.

Republican Don Manzullo, who took office in 1993, was the incumbent. Manzullo was re-elected in 2008 with 61 percent of the vote. In 2010 Manzullo's opponent in the general election was Democratic nominee George Gaulrapp, the mayor of Freeport. Green Party nominee Terry Campbell also ran. Manzullo, Gaulrapp and Campbell were all unopposed in their primaries.

Manzullo raised $1,160,685 and spent $1,133,360. Gaulrapp raised $73,357 and spent $66,924. Prior to the election FiveThirtyEight's forecast gave Manzullo a 100 percent chance of winning and projected that he would receive 65 percent of the vote to Gaulrapp's 33 percent. On election day Manzullo was re-elected with 65 percent of the vote to Gaulrapp's 31 percent. Manzullo unsuccessfully sought re-election in 2012.

=== Predictions ===
Source	Ranking	As of
The Cook Political Report	Safe R	November 1, 2010
Rothenberg	Safe R	November 1, 2010
Sabato's Crystal Ball	Safe R	November 1, 2010
RCP	Safe R	November 1, 2010
CQ Politics	Safe R	October 28, 2010
New York Times	Safe R	November 1, 2010
FiveThirtyEight	Safe R	November 1, 2010

=== General election results ===
Illinois's 16th district general election, November 2, 2010
Party	Candidate	Votes	%
Republican	Don Manzullo (incumbent)	138,299	65.00
Democratic	George Gaulrapp	66,037	31.04
Green	Terry Campbell	8,425	3.96
Total votes		212,761	100.00
Republican hold			

== District 17 ==
2010 Illinois's 17th congressional district election
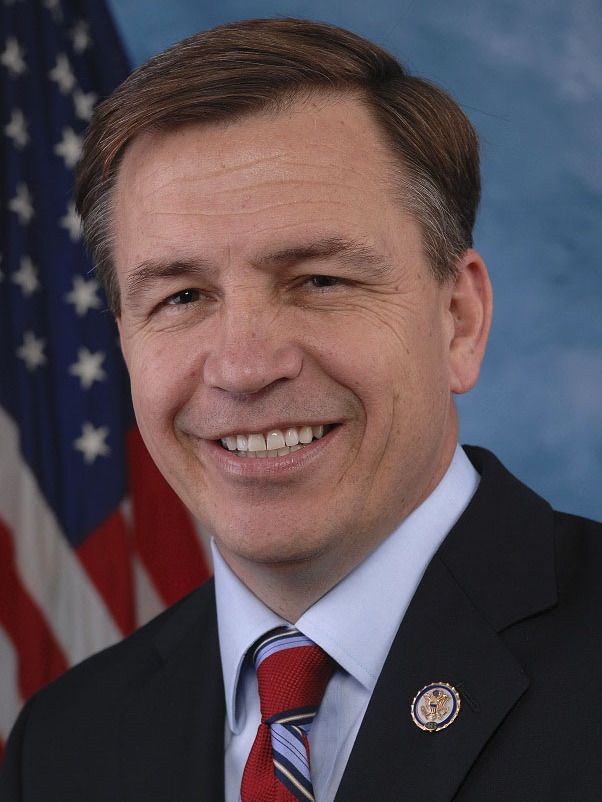

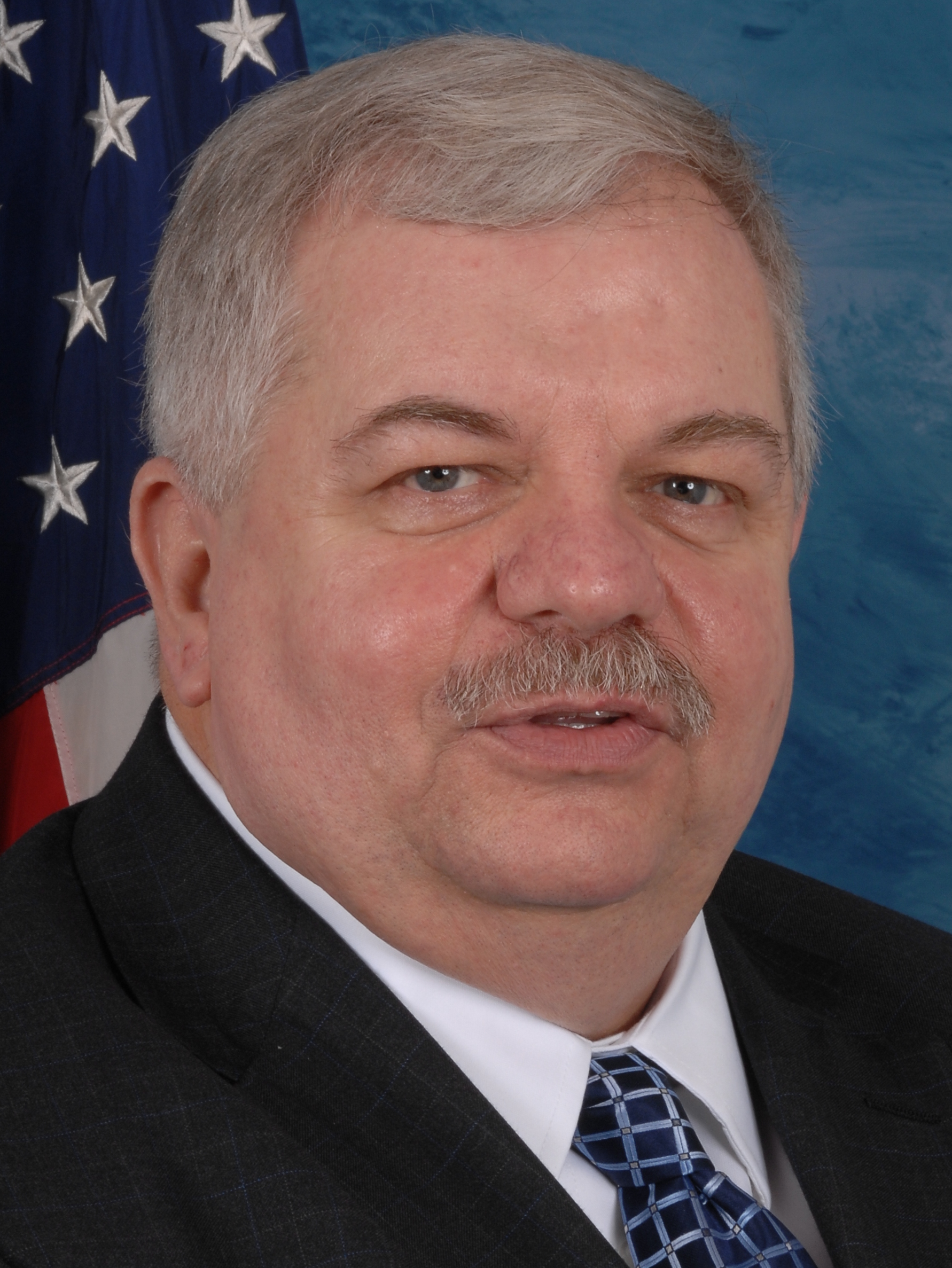
Candidate	Bobby Schilling	Phil Hare
Party	Republican	Democratic
Popular vote	104,583	85,454
Percentage	52.6%	42.9%
- County results Shilling: 40–50% 50–60% 60–70% 70–80% Hare: 40–50% 50–60%
U.S. Representative before election
Phil Hare
Democratic
Elected U.S. Representative
Bobby Schilling
Republican

The 17th district included Moline, Quincy, Rock Island and part of Decatur. The district's population was 85 percent white, 8 percent black and 5 percent Hispanic (see Race and ethnicity in the United States census); 85 percent were high school graduates and 18 percent had received a bachelor's degree or higher. Its median income was $41,128. In the 2008 presidential election the district gave 56 percent of its vote to Democratic Party nominee Barack Obama and 42 percent to Republican Party nominee John McCain.

Democrat Phil Hare, who took office in 2007, was the incumbent. Hare was re-elected unopposed in 2008. In 2010 Hare's opponent in the general election was Republican nominee Bobby Schilling, a restaurant owner. Green Party nominee Roger K. Davis, a former guard at Stateville Correctional Center, also ran. Hare, Schilling and Davis were all unopposed in their primaries. Hare raised $1,364,578 and spent $1,759,078. Schilling raised $1,103,009 and spent $1,093,250.

In a poll of 1,056 likely voters, conducted on February 18, 2010, by We Ask America (WAA), 39 percent of respondents supported Hare, while 32 percent favored Schilling, 4 percent chose Davis, and 26 percent were unsure. In a poll of 715 likely voters, conducted by Magellan Strategies for Schilling's campaign on July 12, 2010, Schilling led with 45 percent to Hare's 32 percent while 23 percent were undecided. A poll by Public Opinion Strategies (POS), the results of which were published in August 2010, found Hare leading with 33 percent to Schilling's 31 percent, while Davis had the support of 7 percent and 30 percent were undecided. A WAA poll of 1,250 likely voters, conducted on September 8, 2010, found 41 percent of respondents supported Schilling, while 38 percent backed Hare, 4 percent chose Davis and 17 percent were undecided. In a poll by the Tarrance Group for the National Republican Congressional Committee (NRCC), conducted between September 23 and 25, 2010, Schilling led with 44 percent to Hare's 43 percent. A POS poll of 400 likely voters, conducted on September 26 and 27, 2010, found Hare leading with 38 percent to Schilling's 37 percent. In a poll conducted for the NRCC, the results of which were published in October 2010, Schilling led with 44 percent to Hare's 41 percent. A poll of 417 likely voters, conducted by Penn Schoen Berland between October 12 and 14, 2010, found Schilling leading with 45 percent to Hare's 38 percent, while 14 percent were undecided. In a WAA poll of 1,103 likely voters, conducted on October 31, 2010, 52 percent of respondents supported Schilling, while 44 percent favored Hare and 4 percent backed Davis.

On election day, Schilling was elected with 53 percent of the vote to Hare's 43 percent. Schilling unsuccessfully sought re-election in 2012 and was succeeded by Democrat Cheri Bustos; Schilling also unsuccessfully challenged Bustos in 2014.

=== Predictions ===
Source	Ranking	As of
The Cook Political Report	Tossup	November 1, 2010
Rothenberg	Tilt R (flip)	November 1, 2010
Sabato's Crystal Ball	Lean R (flip)	November 1, 2010
RCP	Lean R (flip)	November 1, 2010
CQ Politics	Tossup	October 28, 2010
New York Times	Tossup	November 1, 2010
FiveThirtyEight	Tossup	November 1, 2010

=== General election results ===
Illinois's 17th district general election, November 2, 2010
Party	Candidate	Votes	%
Republican	Bobby Schilling	104,583	52.58
Democratic	Phil Hare (incumbent)	85,454	42.96
Green	Roger K. Davis	8,861	4.46
Total votes		198,898	100.00
Republican gain from Democratic			

== District 18 ==
2010 Illinois's 18th congressional district election
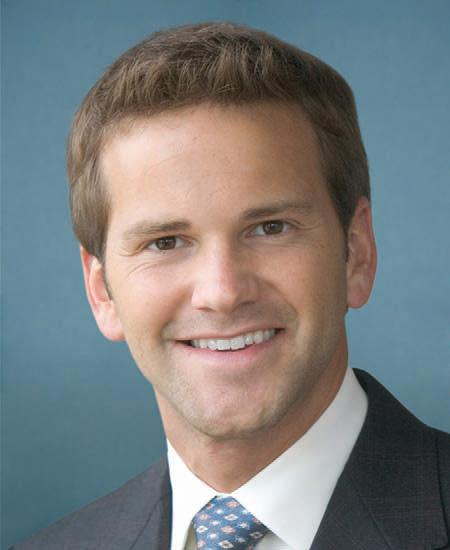

Nominee	Aaron Schock	Deirdre "DK" Hirner	Sheldon Schafer
Party	Republican	Democratic	Green
Popular vote	152,868	57,046	11,256
Percentage	69.1%	25.8%	5.1%
- County results Schock: 60–70% 70–80% 80–90% Hirner: 40–50%
U.S. Representative before election
Aaron Schock
Republican
Elected U.S. Representative
Aaron Schock
Republican

The 18th district included East Peoria, Pekin, Peoria and part of Springfield. The district's population was 88 percent white and 7 percent black (see Race and ethnicity in the United States); 89 percent were high school graduates and 24 percent had received a bachelor's degree or higher. Its median income was $50,932. In the 2008 presidential election the district gave 50 percent of its vote to Republican nominee John McCain and 48 percent to Democratic nominee Barack Obama.

Republican Aaron Schock, who took office in 2009, was the incumbent. Schock was elected in 2008 with 59 percent of the vote. In 2010 Schock's opponent in the general election was Deirdre "DK" Hirner, the former director of the Illinois Environmental Regulatory Group. Green Party nominee Sheldon Schafer, the vice president and director of the Lakeview Museum, also ran. Schock and Schafer were unopposed in their respective party primaries. Carl Ray, a former capital and capacity planner (see Capital planning and Capacity planning) with Caterpillar Inc., also sought the Democratic nomination.

Schock raised $2,300,387 and spent $1,303,848. Hirner raised $135,859 and spent the same amount. Schafer raised $4,055 and spent $4,059. Ray raised $2,860 and spent $2,990.

Prior to the election FiveThirtyEight's forecast gave Schock a 100 percent chance of winning and projected that he would receive 66 percent of the vote to Hirner's 31 percent. On election day Schock was re-elected with 69 percent of the vote to Hirner's 26 percent, while Schafer received 5 percent. Schock was again re-elected in 2012 and 2014, and resigned from Congress in March 2015 following allegations regarding his use of government and campaign funds. He was succeeded by fellow Republican Darin LaHood.

=== Democratic primary results ===
Illinois's 18th district Democratic primary, February 2, 2010
Party	Candidate	Votes	%
Democratic	Deirdre "DK" Hirner	13,683	54.19
Democratic	Carl Ray	11,566	45.81
Total votes		25,249	100.00

==== Predictions ====
Source	Ranking	As of
The Cook Political Report	Safe R	November 1, 2010
Rothenberg	Safe R	November 1, 2010
Sabato's Crystal Ball	Safe R	November 1, 2010
RCP	Safe R	November 1, 2010
CQ Politics	Safe R	October 28, 2010
New York Times	Safe R	November 1, 2010
FiveThirtyEight	Safe R	November 1, 2010

=== General election results ===
Illinois's 18th district general election, November 2, 2010
Party	Candidate	Votes	%
Republican	Aaron Schock (incumbent)	152,868	69.12
Democratic	Deirdre "DK" Hirner	57,046	25.79
Green	Sheldon Schafer	11,256	5.09
Total votes		221,170	100.00
Republican hold			

== District 19 ==
2010 Illinois's 19th congressional district election
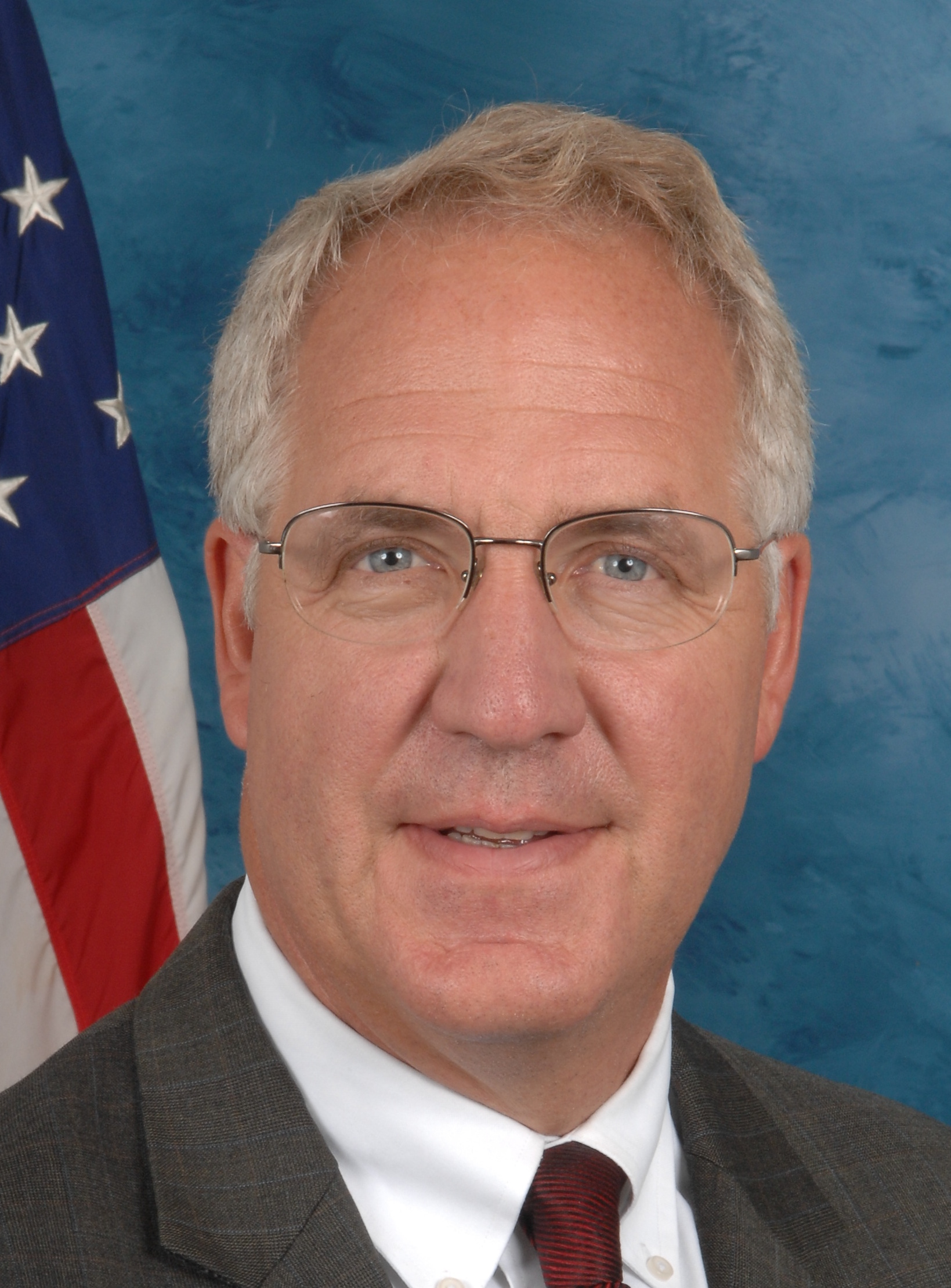

Nominee	John Shimkus	Tim Bagwell
Party	Republican	Democratic
Popular vote	166,166	67,132
Percentage	71.2%	28.8%
- County results Shimkus: 50–60% 60–70% 70–80% 80–90%
U.S. Representative before election
John Shimkus
Republican
Elected U.S. Representative
John Shimkus
Republican

The 19th district included parts of Collinsville, Edwardsville and Springfield. The district's population was 93 percent white (see Race and ethnicity in the United States census); 87 percent were high school graduates and 21 percent had received a bachelor's degree or higher. Its median income was $48,654. In the 2008 presidential election the district gave 54 percent of its vote to Republican nominee John McCain and 44 percent to Democratic nominee Barack Obama.

Republican John Shimkus, who took office in 1997, was the incumbent. Shimkus was re-elected in 2008 with 65 percent of the vote. In 2010 Shimkus's opponent in the general election was Democratic nominee Tim Bagwell, an information technology specialist who also ran in 2004. Michael Firsching, a veterinarian, also sought the Republican nomination. Bagwell was unopposed in the Democratic primary.

Shimkus raised $1,845,128 and spent $1,852,867. Bagwell raised $17,763 and spent $17,649. Firsching raised $537 and spent no money.

Prior to the election FiveThirtyEight's forecast gave Shimkus a 100 percent chance of winning and projected that he would receive 69 percent of the vote to Bagwell's 29 percent. On election day Shimkus was re-elected with 71 percent of the vote to Bagwell's 29 percent. Shimkus was re-elected in the new 15th district in 2012, 2014, 2016 and 2018.

=== Republican primary results ===
Illinois's 19th district Republican primary, February 2, 2010
Party	Candidate	Votes	%
Republican	John Shimkus (incumbent)	48,680	85.34
Republican	Michael Firsching	8,363	14.66
Total votes		57,043	100.00

==== Predictions ====
Source	Ranking	As of
The Cook Political Report	Safe R	November 1, 2010
Rothenberg	Safe R	November 1, 2010
Sabato's Crystal Ball	Safe R	November 1, 2010
RCP	Safe R	November 1, 2010
CQ Politics	Safe R	October 28, 2010
New York Times	Safe R	November 1, 2010
FiveThirtyEight	Safe R	November 1, 2010

=== General election results ===
Illinois's 19th district general election, November 2, 2010
Party	Candidate	Votes	%
Republican	John Shimkus (incumbent)	166,166	71.22
Democratic	Tim Bagwell	67,132	28.78
Total votes		233,298	100.00
Republican hold			

== See also ==
- List of United States representatives from Illinois
- Illinois's congressional delegations
