= Sharon Denise Dixon =

American politician (born 1962)

Chicago City Council
- In office May 21, 2007 – May 2011
- Preceded by: Michael D. Chandler
- Succeeded by: Michael D. Chandler
- Constituency: 24th Ward

Personal details
- Born: December 11, 1962 (age 63)
- Party: Democratic
- Education: University of Illinois at Chicago

Sharon Denise Dixon (born December 11, 1962) is an American politician who represented the 24th Ward on the Chicago City Council from 2007 to 2011. In 2010 Dixon was a candidate in the Democratic Party primary for the United States House of Representatives in Illinois's 7th congressional district.

== Early life ==
Dixon grew up in the Lawndale neighborhood of Chicago and graduated from Manley High School in 1980. She earned a BA in criminal justice from the University of Illinois at Chicago in 1985.

== Career ==
Prior to entering politics, Dixon worked in various capacities for Cook County Hospital, American Airlines, General Electric, Northwestern Memorial Hospital, and Ada S. McKinley Community Services. She left working to campaign for alderman. In the February 27, 2007 municipal election, Dixon finished second in a field of seven candidates; she won by 192 votes in a run-off on April 17. Alderman Dixon was sworn into office on May 21, 2007. In 2008, she ran for 24th Ward Committeeman and won with 78 percent of the vote.

In 2010, three years into her first (four-year) term as alderman, Dixon challenged incumbent congressman Danny K. Davis in the Democratic primary.

In 2011, she was defeated in a run-off election against Michael D. Chandler.
