= 2016 United States House of Representatives elections in Illinois =

- November 8, 2016

All 18 Illinois seats to the United States House of Representatives
	Majority party	Minority party
Party	Democratic	Republican
Last election	10	8
Seats won	11	7
Seat change	▲1	▼1
Popular vote	2,810,536	2,397,436
Percentage	53.62%	45.74%
Swing	▲2.20%	▼2.86%

Democratic hold Democratic gain
Republican hold
Democratic
40–50%
50–60%
60–70%
70–80%
80–90%
90–100%
Republican
50–60%
60–70%
70–80%
80–90%
90–100%

The 2016 United States House of Representatives elections in Illinois were held on November 8, 2016, to elect the 18 U.S. representatives from the state of Illinois, one from each of the state's 18 congressional districts. The elections coincided with the 2016 U.S. presidential election, as well as other elections to the House of Representatives, elections to the United States Senate and various state and local elections.

The filing deadline for candidates for major parties was November 30, 2015. The candidates listed below were the official filed candidates for the party primaries for each district, per the Illinois State Board of Elections. Objections to a candidate's nomination papers needed to be filed by December 7, 2015. The primaries were held on March 15.

== Statewide ==
=== By district ===
Results of the 2016 United States House of Representatives elections in Illinois by district:

District	Democratic		Republican		Others		Total		Result
District	Votes	%	Votes	%	Votes	%	Votes	%	Result
District 1	234,037	74.09%	81,817	25.90%	8	0.00%	315,862	100.0%	Democratic hold
District 2	235,051	78.91%	59,471	20.19%	0	0.00%	294,522	100.0%	Democratic hold
District 3	225,320	100.0%	0	0.00%	0	0.00%	225,411	100.0%	Democratic hold
District 4	171,297	100.0%	0	0.00%	0	0.00%	171,297	100.0%	Democratic hold
District 5	212,842	67.84%	86,222	27.48%	14,660	4.67%	313,724	100.0%	Democratic hold
District 6	143,591	40.78%	208,555	59.22%	0	0.00%	352,146	100.0%	Republican hold
District 7	250,584	84.24%	46,882	15.76%	0	0.00%	297,466	100.0%	Democratic hold
District 8	144,954	58.31%	103,617	41.68%	5	0.00%	248,571	100.0%	Democratic hold
District 9	217,306	66.47%	109,550	33.51%	92	0.00%	326,948	100.0%	Democratic hold
District 10	150,435	52.60%	135,535	47.39%	26	0.00%	285,996	100.0%	Democratic gain
District 11	166,578	60.45%	108,995	39.55%	0	0.00%	275,573	100.0%	Democratic hold
District 12	124,246	39.69%	169,976	54.31%	18,780	6.00%	313,002	100.0%	Republican hold
District 13	126,811	40.34%	187,583	59.66%	0	0.00%	314,394	100.0%	Republican hold
District 14	137,589	40.70%	200,508	59.30%	0	0.00%	338,097	100.0%	Republican hold
District 15	0	0.00%	274,554	100.0%	0	0.00%	274,554	100.0%	Republican hold
District 16	0	0.00%	259,722	100.0%	131	0.00%	259,853	100.0%	Republican hold
District 17	173,125	60.31%	113,943	39.69%	0	0.00%	287,068	100.0%	Democratic hold
District 18	96,770	27.86%	250,506	72.13%	7	0.00%	347,283	100.0%	Republican hold
Total	2,810,536	53.62%	2,397,436	45.74%	33,795	0.64%	5,241,767	100.0%	

== District 1 ==
2016 Illinois's 1st congressional district election
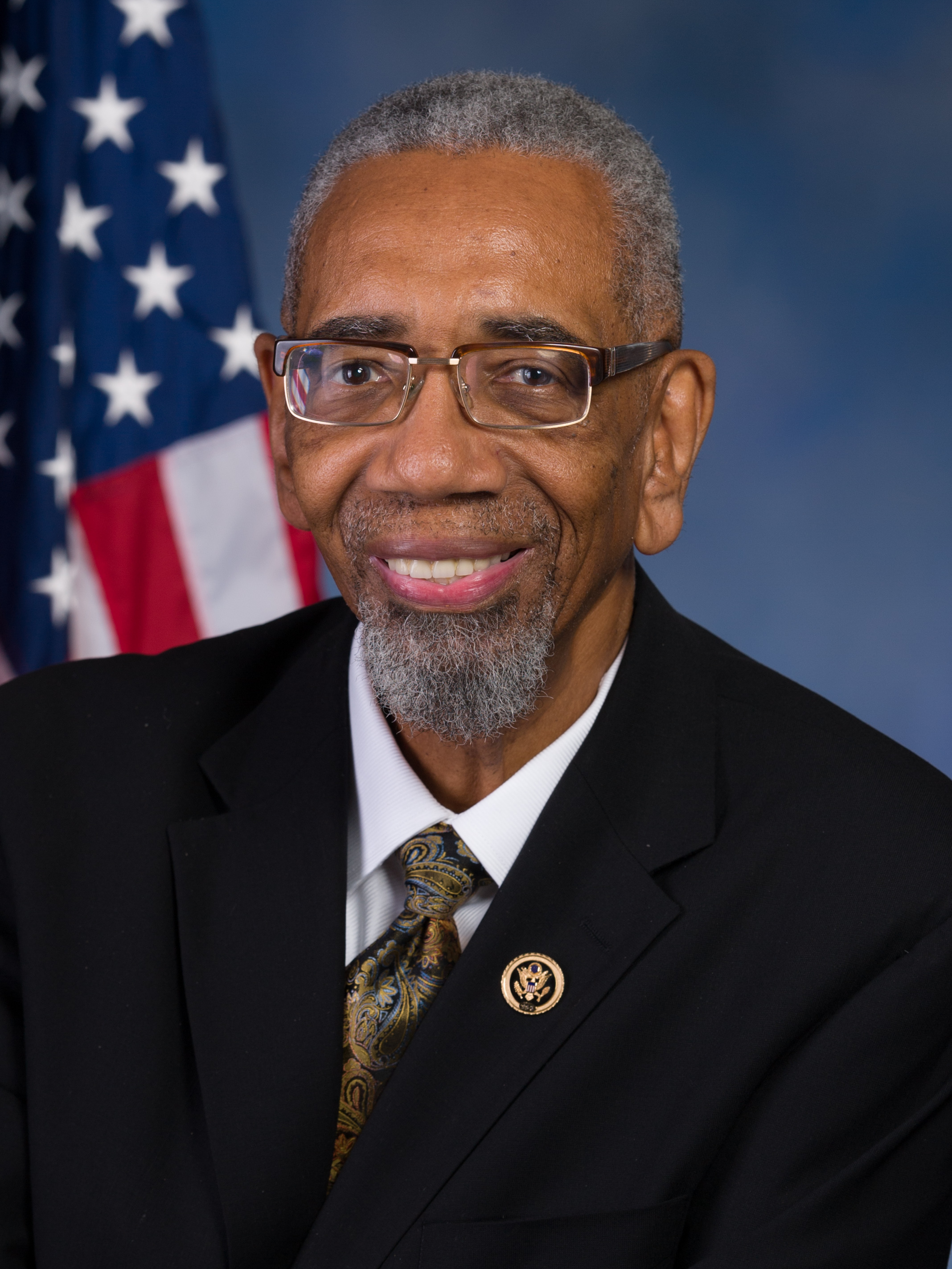

Nominee	Bobby Rush	August Deuser
Party	Democratic	Republican
Popular vote	234,037	81,817
Percentage	74.1%	25.9%
- County results Rush: 80–90% Deuser: 60–70%
U.S. Representative before election
Bobby Rush
Democratic
Elected U.S. Representative
Bobby Rush
Democratic

The incumbent was Democrat Bobby Rush, who had represented the district since 1993. He was re-elected with 73% of the vote in 2014. The district had a PVI of D+28.

=== Democratic primary ===
On November 12, 2015, Chicago Alderman Howard Brookins Jr. was reported to be circulating petitions to run for Congress, leading to speculation that Rush might retire. Brookins had previously circulated petitions in 2013, but declined to run at that time when Rush announced for re-election. Brookins announced that this time he would run for the seat, regardless of Rush's decision. In November 2015, Rush announced that he would run for re-election.

Former Cure Violence director and 2014 gubernatorial candidate Tio Hardiman had announced he would challenge Rush for the Democratic nomination. Hardiman withdrew in order to run for Cook County Clerk of Court.

==== Candidates ====
===== Nominee =====
- Bobby Rush, incumbent U.S. representative

===== Eliminated in primary =====
- Howard Brookins, Chicago Alderman
- Patrick Brutus, economic development consultant and candidate for the 2nd district in 2013

===== Removed =====
- Harold Bailey, City Parks District employee and candidate for this seat in 2010 and 2012

===== Endorsements =====
Bobby Rush

Newspapers

- Chicago Sun-Times
Howard Brookins, Jr.

Newspapers

- Chicago Tribune

==== Primary results ====
Democratic primary results
Party	Candidate	Votes	%
Democratic	Bobby Rush (incumbent)	128,402	71.4
Democratic	Howard Brookins	34,645	19.3
Democratic	Patrick Brutus	16,696	9.3
Total votes		179,743	100.0

=== Republican primary ===
==== Candidates ====
===== Nominee =====
- August Deuser

===== Eliminated in primary =====
- Jimmy Lee Tillman

==== Primary results ====
Republican primary results
Party	Candidate	Votes	%
Republican	August Deuser	24,584	73.8
Republican	Jimmy Lee Tillman	8,737	26.2
Total votes		33,321	100.0

=== General election ===
==== Predictions ====
Source	Ranking	As of
The Cook Political Report	Safe D	November 7, 2016
Daily Kos Elections	Safe D	November 7, 2016
Rothenberg	Safe D	November 3, 2016
Sabato's Crystal Ball	Safe D	November 7, 2016
RCP	Safe D	October 31, 2016

==== Results ====
Illinois's 1st congressional district, 2016
Party	Candidate	Votes	%
Democratic	Bobby Rush (incumbent)	234,037	74.1
Republican	August Deuser	81,817	25.9
Independent	Tabitha Carson (write-in)	8	0.0
Total votes		315,862	100.0
Democratic hold			

== District 2 ==
2016 Illinois's 2nd congressional district election
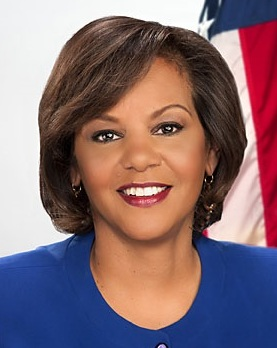

Nominee	Robin Kelly	John Morrow
Party	Democratic	Republican
Popular vote	235,051	59,471
Percentage	79.8%	20.2%
- County results Kelly: 50–60% 80–90% Morrow: 50–60%
U.S. Representative before election
Robin Kelly
Democratic
Elected U.S. Representative
Robin Kelly
Democratic

The incumbent was Democrat Robin Kelly, who had represented the district since 2013. She was re-elected with 78% of the vote in 2014. The district had a PVI of D+29.

Kelly considered running for the U.S. Senate, but decided to run for re-election instead.

=== Democratic primary ===
==== Candidates ====
===== Nominee =====
- Robin Kelly, incumbent U.S. representative

===== Eliminated in primary =====
- Marcus Lewis, postal worker, independent candidate in 2012 and 2013 and Democratic candidate in 2014
- Dorian Myrickes
- Charles Rayburn, candidate in 2013 and 2014

===== Endorsements =====
Robin Kelly

Newspapers

- Chicago Sun-Times
- Chicago Tribune

==== Primary results ====
Democratic primary results
Party	Candidate	Votes	%
Democratic	Robin Kelly (incumbent)	115,752	73.9
Democratic	Marcus Lewis	25,280	16.1
Democratic	Charles Rayburn	9,559	6.2
Democratic	Dorian Myrickes	6,002	3.8
Total votes		156,593	100.0

=== Republican primary ===
==== Candidates ====
===== Nominee =====
- John Morrow

==== Primary results ====
Republican primary results
Party	Candidate	Votes	%
Republican	John Morrow	27,303	100.0
Total votes		27,303	100.0

=== General election ===
==== Predictions ====
Source	Ranking	As of
The Cook Political Report	Safe D	November 7, 2016
Daily Kos Elections	Safe D	November 7, 2016
Rothenberg	Safe D	November 3, 2016
Sabato's Crystal Ball	Safe D	November 7, 2016
RCP	Safe D	October 31, 2016

==== Results ====
Illinois's 2nd congressional district, 2016
Party	Candidate	Votes	%
Democratic	Robin Kelly (incumbent)	235,051	79.8
Republican	John Morrow	59,471	20.2
Total votes		294,522	100.0
Democratic hold			

== District 3 ==
2016 Illinois's 3rd congressional district election
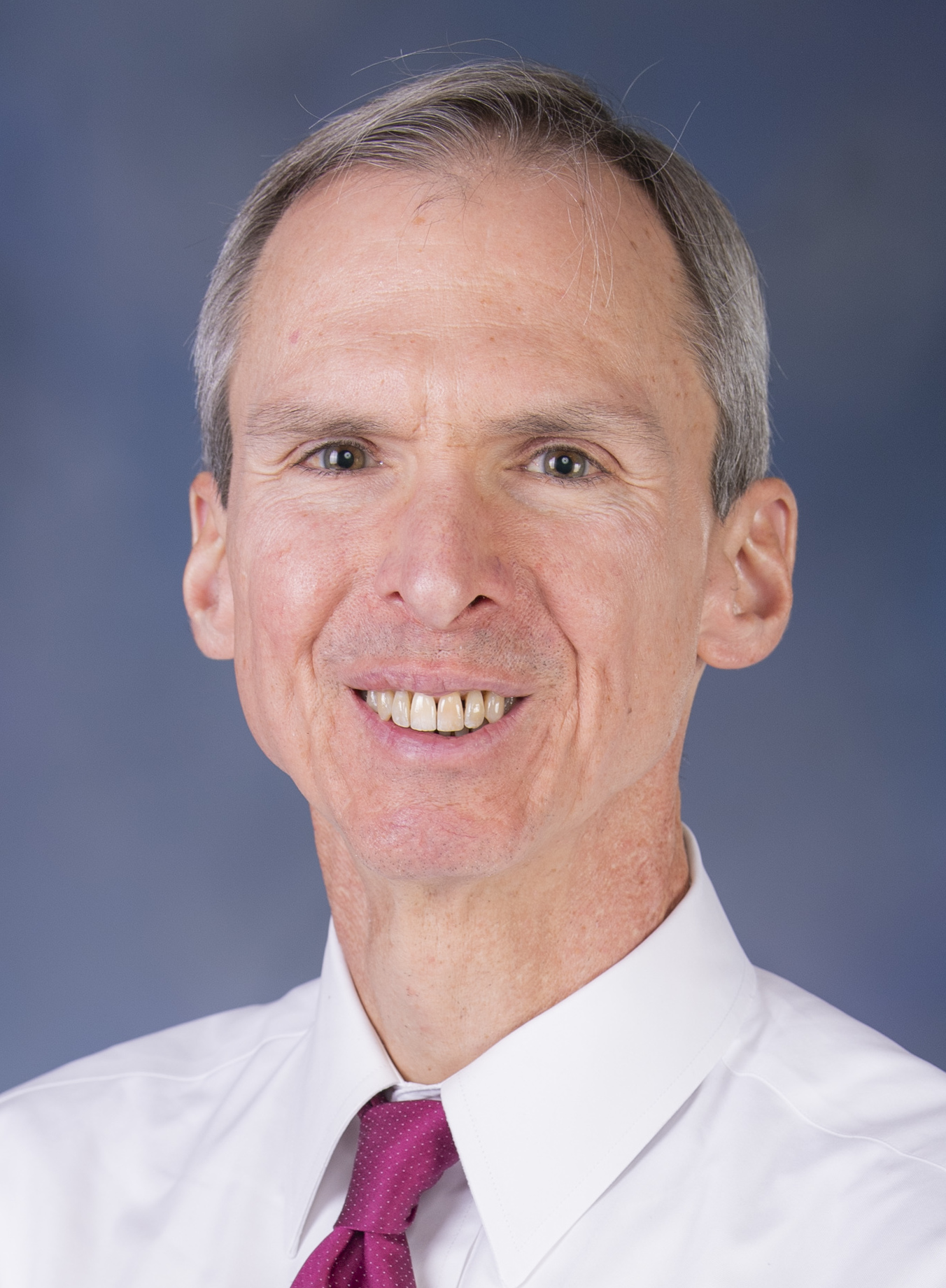
Nominee	Dan Lipinski
Party	Democratic
Popular vote	225,320
Percentage	100.0%
- County results Lipinski: 90–100%
U.S. Representative before election
Dan Lipinski
Democratic
Elected U.S. Representative
Dan Lipinski
Democratic

The incumbent was Democrat Dan Lipinski, who had represented the district since 2005. He was re-elected with 65% of the vote in 2014. The district had a PVI of D+5.

=== Democratic primary ===
Incumbent Dan Lipinski ran unopposed for the Democratic nomination. Oren Jacobson, a tech entrepreneur, had formed an exploratory committee in May 2015 to consider a primary challenge of Lipinski. Jacobson terminated the committee in July 2015.

==== Candidates ====
===== Nominee =====
- Dan Lipinski, incumbent U.S. representative

===== Declined =====
- Oren Jacobson, tech entrepreneur

==== Primary results ====
Democratic primary results
Party	Candidate	Votes	%
Democratic	Dan Lipinski (incumbent)	107,620	100.0
Total votes		107,620	100.0

=== Republican primary ===
==== Candidates ====
===== Removed =====
- Art Jones, neo-Nazi

=== General election ===
==== Predictions ====
Source	Ranking	As of
The Cook Political Report	Safe D	November 7, 2016
Daily Kos Elections	Safe D	November 7, 2016
Rothenberg	Safe D	November 3, 2016
Sabato's Crystal Ball	Safe D	November 7, 2016
RCP	Safe D	October 31, 2016

==== Results ====
Illinois's 3rd congressional district, 2016
Party	Candidate	Votes	%
Democratic	Dan Lipinski (incumbent)	225,320	100.0
Independent	Diane Harris (write-in)	91	0.0
Total votes		225,411	100.0
Democratic hold			

== District 4 ==
2016 Illinois's 4th congressional district election
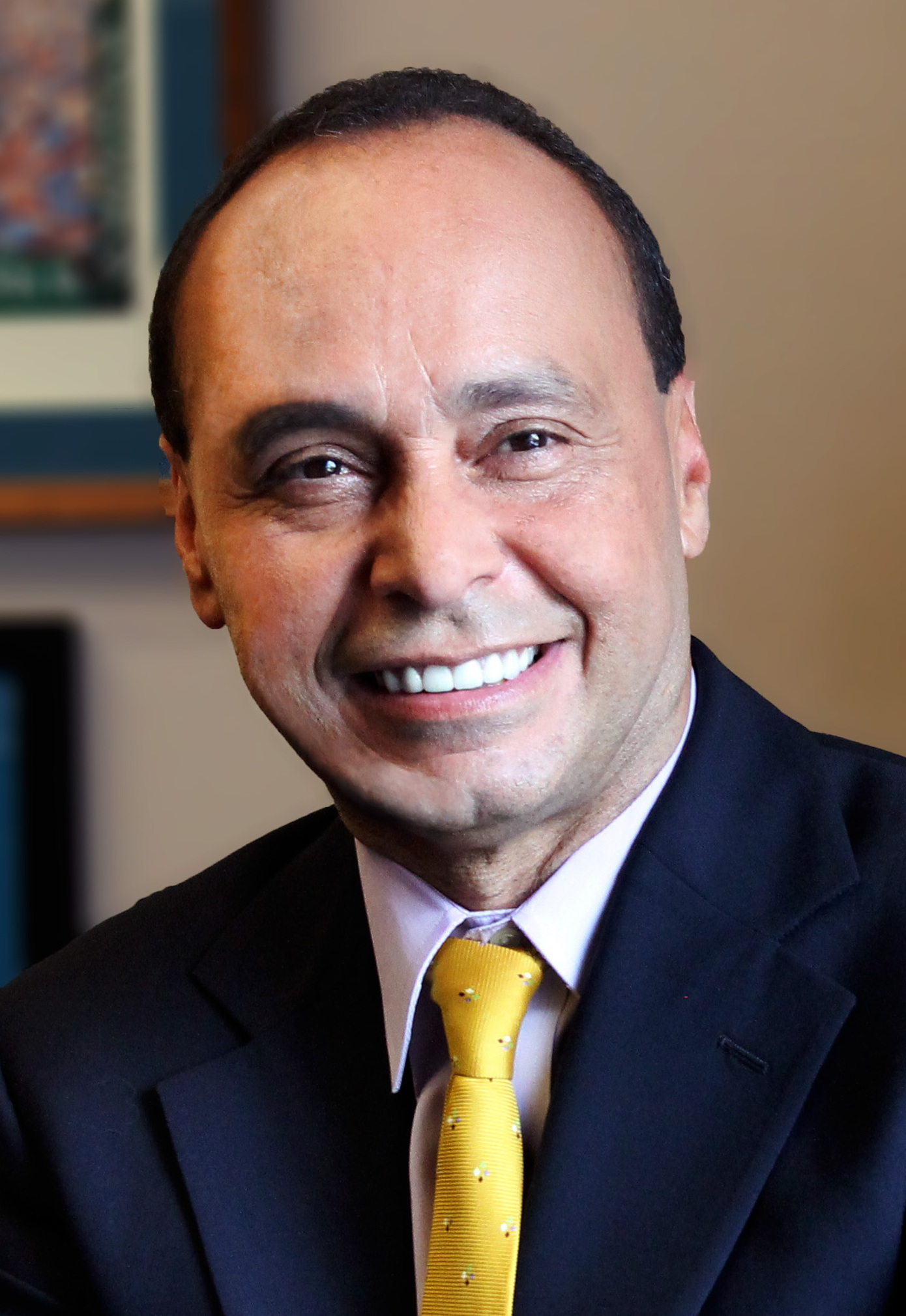
Nominee	Luis Gutiérrez
Party	Democratic
Popular vote	171,297
Percentage	100.0%
U.S. Representative before election
Luis Gutiérrez
Democratic
Elected U.S. Representative
Luis Gutiérrez
Democratic

The incumbent was Democrat Luis Gutiérrez, who had represented the district since 1993. He was re-elected with 78% of the vote in 2014. The district had a PVI of D+29.

=== Democratic primary ===
Javier Salas, a former journalist and former senior policy adviser to Governor Pat Quinn, challenged Gutiérrez for the Democratic nomination. Salas cited Gutiérrez's support for Mayor Rahm Emanuel over challenger Chuy Garcia in the 2015 Chicago mayoral election as a reason for his primary challenge.

==== Candidates ====
===== Nominee =====
- Luis Gutiérrez, incumbent U.S. representative

===== Eliminated in primary =====
- Javier Salas, former journalist, radio host and senior policy adviser to Governor Pat Quinn

===== Endorsements =====
Luis V. Gutierrez

Newspapers

- Chicago Sun-Times
- Chicago Tribune

==== Primary results ====
Democratic primary results
Party	Candidate	Votes	%
Democratic	Luis Gutiérrez (incumbent)	92,779	75.2
Democratic	Javier Salas	30,640	24.8
Total votes		123,419	100.0

=== Republican primary ===
No candidates filed for the Republican primary for this seat.

=== General election ===
==== Predictions ====
Source	Ranking	As of
The Cook Political Report	Safe D	November 7, 2016
Daily Kos Elections	Safe D	November 7, 2016
Rothenberg	Safe D	November 3, 2016
Sabato's Crystal Ball	Safe D	November 7, 2016
RCP	Safe D	October 31, 2016

==== Results ====
Illinois's 4th congressional district, 2016
Party	Candidate	Votes	%
Democratic	Luis Gutiérrez (incumbent)	171,297	100.0
Total votes		171,297	100.0
Democratic hold			

== District 5 ==
2016 Illinois's 5th congressional district election
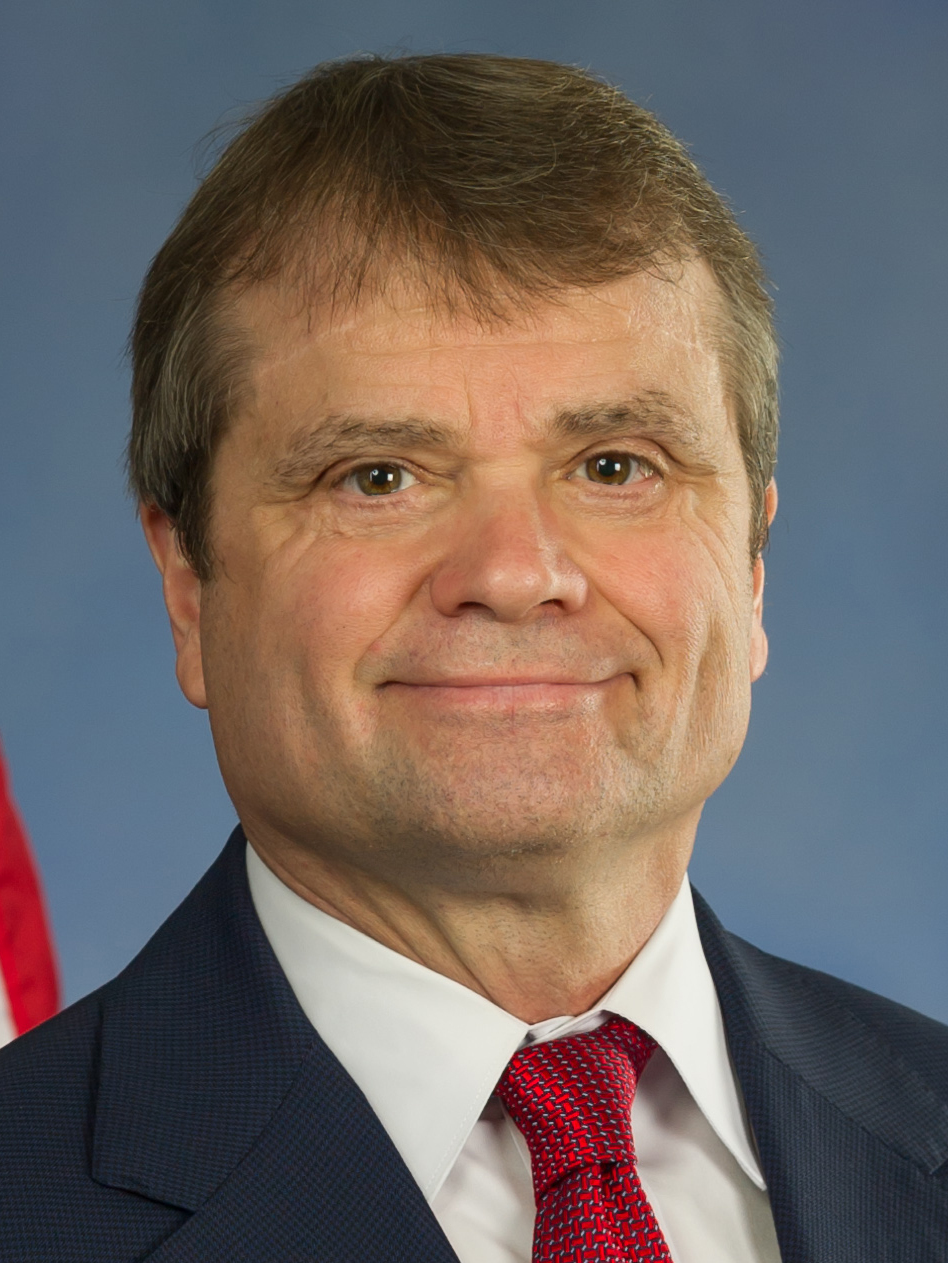

Nominee	Mike Quigley	Vince Kolber
Party	Democratic	Republican
Popular vote	212,842	86,222
Percentage	67.8%	27.5%
- County results Quigley: 70–80% Kolber: 50–60%
U.S. Representative before election
Mike Quigley
Democratic
Elected U.S. Representative
Mike Quigley
Democratic

The incumbent was Democrat Mike Quigley, who had represented the district since 2009. He was re-elected with 63% of the vote in 2014. The district had a PVI of D+16.

=== Democratic primary ===
==== Candidates ====
===== Nominee =====
- Mike Quigley, incumbent U.S. representative

==== Primary results ====
Democratic primary results
Party	Candidate	Votes	%
Democratic	Mike Quigley (incumbent)	127,679	100.0
Total votes		127,679	100.0

=== Republican primary ===
No candidates filed for the Republican primary for this seat.

=== Green primary ===
==== Candidates ====
===== Nominee =====
- Rob Sherman, atheist activist, businessman, and perennial candidate

===== Eliminated in primary =====
- Warren "Grizz" Grimsley

===== Removed from ballot =====
- Richard Mayers

===== Endorsements =====
Warren Grizz" Grimsley

Newspapers

- Chicago Sun-Times

==== Primary results ====
Green primary results
Party	Candidate	Votes	%
Green	Rob Sherman	157	57.9
Green	Warren Grimsley	114	42.1
Total votes		271	100.0

=== General election ===
==== Predictions ====
Source	Ranking	As of
The Cook Political Report	Safe D	November 7, 2016
Daily Kos Elections	Safe D	November 7, 2016
Rothenberg	Safe D	November 3, 2016
Sabato's Crystal Ball	Safe D	November 7, 2016
RCP	Safe D	October 31, 2016

==== Results ====
Illinois's 5th congressional district, 2016
Party	Candidate	Votes	%
Democratic	Mike Quigley (incumbent)	212,842	67.8
Republican	Vince Kolber	86,222	27.5
Green	Rob Sherman	14,657	4.7
Independent	Michael Krynski (write-in)	3	0.0
Total votes		313,724	100.0
Democratic hold			

== District 6 ==
2016 Illinois's 6th congressional district election
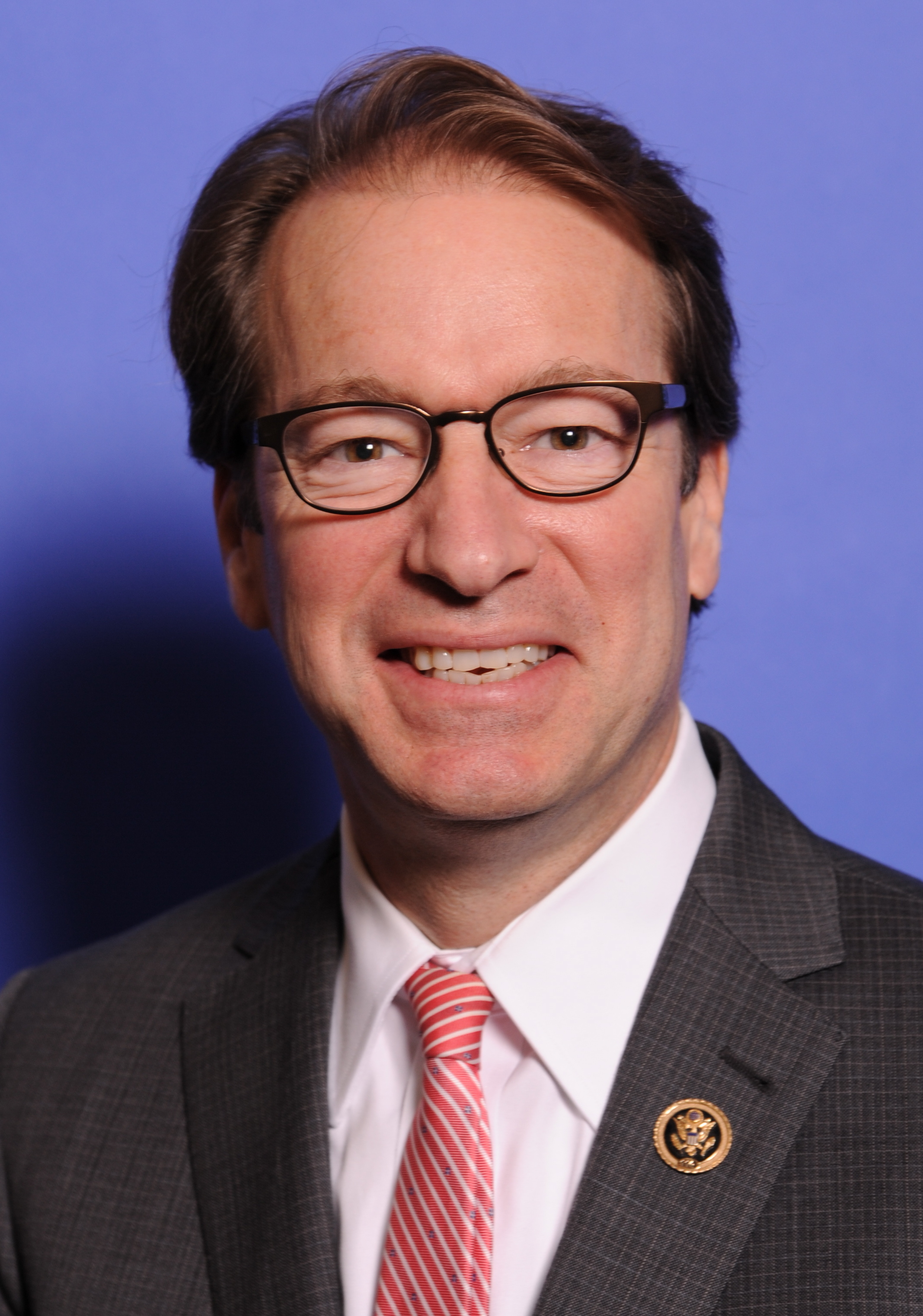

Nominee	Peter Roskam	Amanda Howland
Party	Republican	Democratic
Popular vote	208,555	143,591
Percentage	59.2%	40.8%
- County results Roskam: 50–60% 60–70%
U.S. Representative before election
Peter Roskam
Republican
Elected U.S. Representative
Peter Roskam
Republican

The incumbent was Republican Peter Roskam, who had represented the district since 2007. He was re-elected with 67% of the vote in 2014. The district had a PVI of R+4.

=== Republican primary ===
Glen Ellyn Park District commissioner Jay Kinzler opposed Roskam in the primary. Kinzler ran to the political right of Roskam.

==== Candidates ====
===== Nominee =====
- Peter Roskam, incumbent U.S. representative

===== Eliminated in primary =====
- Gordon "Jay" Kinzler, Glen Ellyn Park District commissioner

===== Withdrawn =====
- Gerald "Jerry" Drabik

===== Endorsements =====
Peter Roskam

Newspapers

- Chicago Tribune

==== Primary results ====
Republican primary results
Party	Candidate	Votes	%
Republican	Peter Roskam (incumbent)	83,344	68.8
Republican	Jay Kinzler	37,834	31.2
Total votes		121,178	100.0

=== Democratic primary ===
==== Candidates ====
===== Nominee =====
- Amanda Howland, College of Lake County trustee and 2012 state senate candidate

===== Eliminated in primary =====
- Robert Marshall, radiologist and perennial candidate

===== Endorsements =====
Amanda Howland

Newspapers

- Chicago Sun-Times
- Chicago Tribune

==== Primary results ====
Democratic primary results
Party	Candidate	Votes	%
Democratic	Amanda Howland	51,101	67.1
Democratic	Robert Marshall	25,027	32.9
Total votes		76,128	100.0

=== General election ===
==== Predictions ====
Source	Ranking	As of
The Cook Political Report	Safe R	November 7, 2016
Daily Kos Elections	Safe R	November 7, 2016
Rothenberg	Safe R	November 3, 2016
Sabato's Crystal Ball	Safe R	November 7, 2016
RCP	Safe R	October 31, 2016

==== Results ====
Illinois's 6th congressional district, 2016
Party	Candidate	Votes	%
Republican	Peter Roskam (incumbent)	208,555	59.2
Democratic	Amanda Howland	143,591	40.8
Total votes		352,146	100.0
Republican hold			

== District 7 ==
2016 Illinois's 7th congressional district election
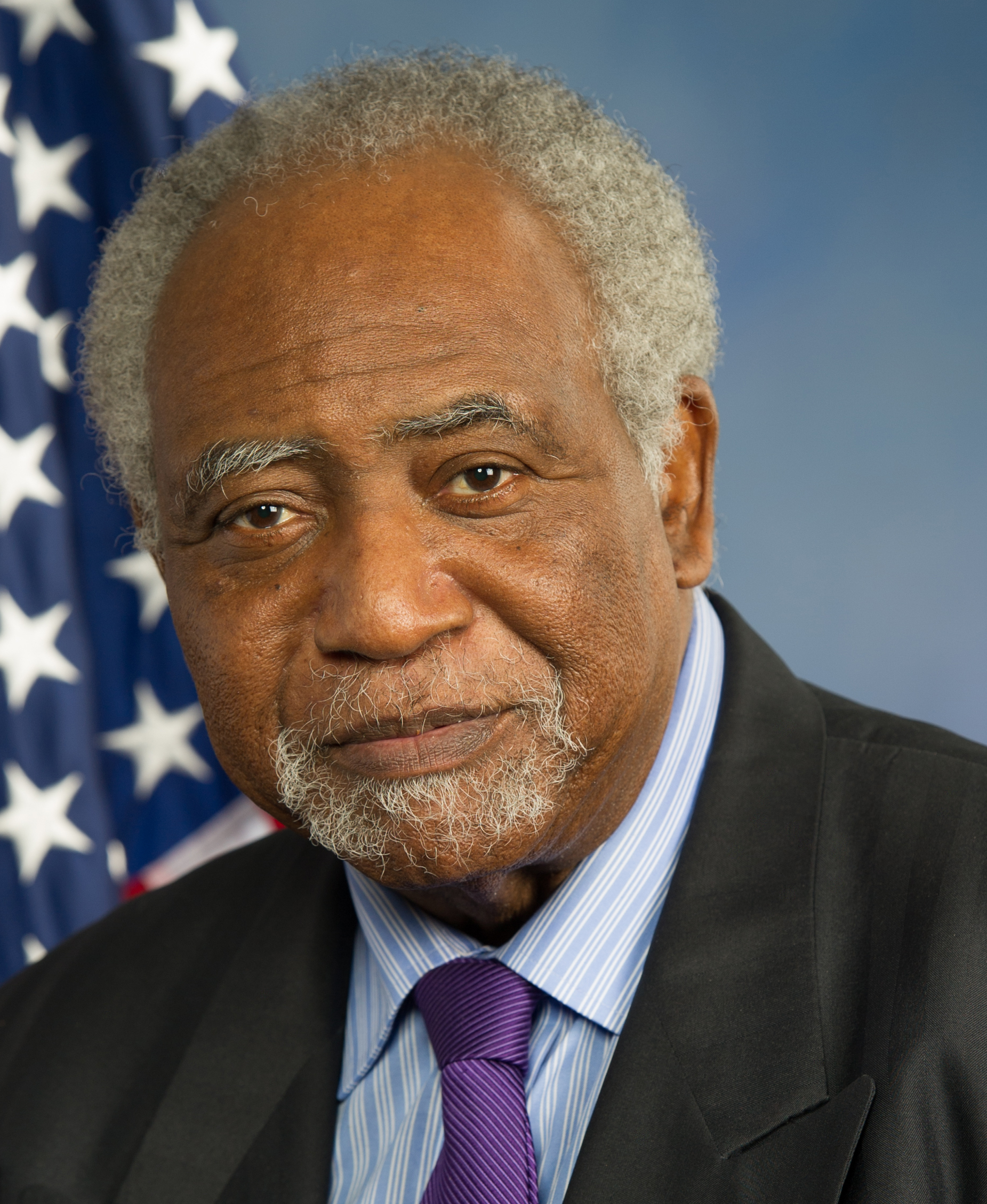

Nominee	Danny K. Davis	Jeffrey Leef
Party	Democratic	Republican
Popular vote	250,584	46,882
Percentage	84.2%	15.8%
- County results Davis: 80–90%
U.S. Representative before election
Danny K. Davis
Democratic
Elected U.S. Representative
Danny K. Davis
Democratic

The incumbent was Democrat Danny K. Davis, who had represented the district since 1997. He was re-elected with 85% of the vote in 2014. The district had a PVI of D+36.

=== Democratic primary ===
==== Candidates ====
===== Nominee =====
- Danny K. Davis, incumbent U.S. representative

===== Eliminated in primary =====
- Thomas Day

===== Removed =====
- Frederick Collins

===== Endorsements =====
Danny Davis

Newspapers

- Chicago Sun-Times
- Chicago Tribune

==== Primary results ====
Democratic primary results
Party	Candidate	Votes	%
Democratic	Danny K. Davis (incumbent)	139,378	81.2
Democratic	Thomas Day	32,261	18.8
Democratic	Frederick Collins (write-in)	25	0.0
Total votes		171,664	100.0

=== Republican primary ===
No candidates filed for the Republican primary for this seat.

=== General election ===
==== Predictions ====
Source	Ranking	As of
The Cook Political Report	Safe D	November 7, 2016
Daily Kos Elections	Safe D	November 7, 2016
Rothenberg	Safe D	November 3, 2016
Sabato's Crystal Ball	Safe D	November 7, 2016
RCP	Safe D	October 31, 2016

==== Results ====
Illinois's 7th congressional district, 2016
Party	Candidate	Votes	%
Democratic	Danny K. Davis (incumbent)	250,584	84.2
Republican	Jeffrey Leef	46,882	15.8
Total votes		297,466	100.0
Democratic hold			

== District 8 ==
2016 Illinois's 8th congressional district election
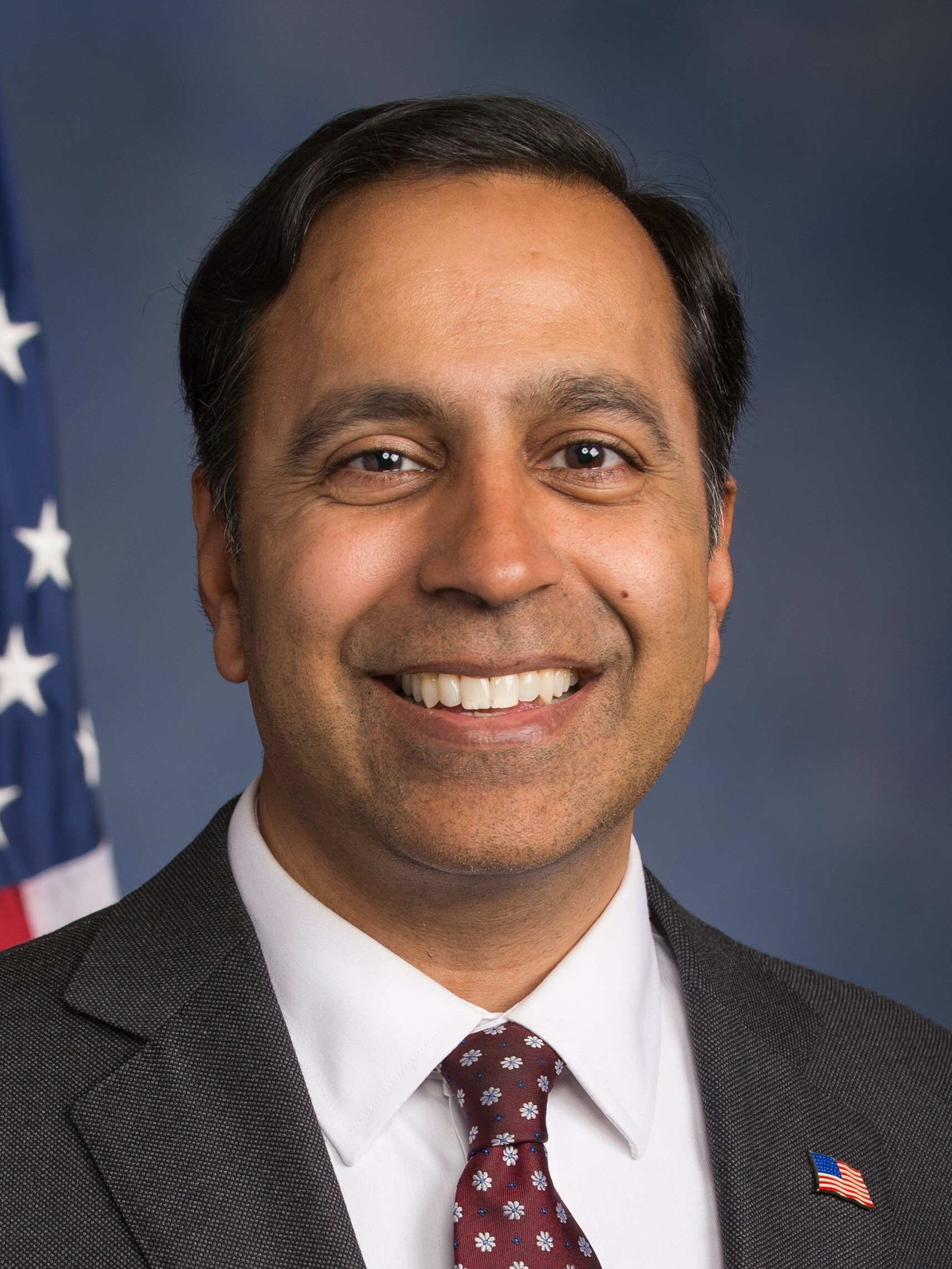

Nominee	Raja Krishnamoorthi	Pete DiCianni
Party	Democratic	Republican
Popular vote	144,954	103,617
Percentage	58.3%	41.7%
- County results Krishnamoorthi: 50–60% 60–70%
U.S. Representative before election
Tammy Duckworth
Democratic
Elected U.S. Representative
Raja Krishnamoorthi
Democratic

The incumbent was Democrat Tammy Duckworth, who had represented the district since 2013, and who retired so she could run for the United States Senate in 2016 against Republican incumbent Mark Kirk. She was re-elected with 56% of the vote in 2014. The district had a PVI of D+8.

=== Democratic primary ===
Democrats Raja Krishnamoorthi, a past candidate for the district, and State Senator Mike Noland declared they would run for the district. Krishnamoorthi was endorsed by Representative Jan Schakowsky.

==== Candidates ====
===== Nominee =====
- Raja Krishnamoorthi, former deputy state treasurer, candidate for this seat in 2012, and candidate for Comptroller in 2010

===== Eliminated in primary =====
- Deb Bullwinkel, Mayor of Villa Park
- Michael Noland, state senator

===== Withdrawn =====
- Tom Cullerton, state senator (running for re-election)

===== Declined =====
- Jenny Burke, legal analyst, Itasca School Board member and 2014 State House Candidate
- Tammy Duckworth, incumbent U.S. representative (running for the U.S. Senate)

===== Endorsements =====
Tom Cullerton (Withdrawn)

Organizations

- VoteVets.org
Raja Krishnamoorthi

U.S. Senators

- Bill Bradley, former U.S. senator
- Adlai Stevenson III, former U.S. senator

U.S. Representatives

- Joaquín Castro, U.S. representative
- Joseph Crowley, U.S. representative
- Danny K. Davis, U.S. representative
- Luis Gutiérrez, U.S. representative
- Jim Himes, U.S. representative
- Ted Lieu, U.S. representative
- Dan Lipinski, U.S. representative
- Abner Mikva, former U.S. representative, former Court of Appeals Judge and former White House Counsel
- Mike Quigley, U.S. representative
- Jan Schakowsky, U.S. representative

State legislators

- David Koehler, state senator
- Dan Kotowski, state senator

Labor unions

- Amalgamated Transit Union
- Transport Workers Union
- United Airplane Pilots Union
- United Ironworkers Union
- United Mechanists Union
- United Steelworkers Union

Organizations

- Sierra Club

Newspapers

- Chicago Daily Herald
- Chicago Sun-Times
- Chicago Tribune

Local officials

- Bill McLeod, Mayor of Hoffman Estates
- Karen Yarbrough, Cook County Recorder of Deeds

Individuals

- Beth Marcin, president of the Greater Palatine Area Democrats
- Newton N. Minow, former chairman of the FCC
- David Wilhelm, former chairman of the Democratic National Committee
Michael Noland

State legislators

- John Cullerton, Illinois State Senator (President of the Illinois Senate) and former Illinois State Representative

==== Primary results ====
Democratic primary results
Party	Candidate	Votes	%
Democratic	Raja Krishnamoorthi	44,950	57.0
Democratic	Michael Noland	22,925	29.1
Democratic	Deborah Bullwinkel	11,005	13.9
Total votes		78,880	100.0

=== Republican primary ===
==== Candidates ====
===== Nominee =====
- Pete DiCianni, DuPage County Commissioner and former mayor of Elmhurst

===== Removed =====
- Richard Evans
- Joseph Hantsch
- Andrew Straw, disability rights attorney and Green candidate for Indiana's 2nd congressional district in 2012

===== Declined =====
- Larry Kaifesh, retired United States Marine Corps Colonel and nominee for this seat in 2014
- David McSweeney, state representative
- Darlene Ruscitti, DuPage County Superintendent of Education
- Tim Schneider, Cook County Commissioner and chairman of the Illinois Republican Party

===== Endorsements =====
Andrew Straw (removed)

Individuals

- Fred White, candidate for Mayor of Chicago in 2011

==== Primary results ====
Republican primary results
Party	Candidate	Votes	%
Republican	Pete DiCianni	51,047	100.0
Republican	Andrew Staw (write-in)	13	0.0
Total votes		51,060	100.0

=== General election ===
==== Predictions ====
Source	Ranking	As of
The Cook Political Report	Safe D	November 7, 2016
Daily Kos Elections	Safe D	November 7, 2016
Rothenberg	Safe D	November 3, 2016
Sabato's Crystal Ball	Safe D	November 7, 2016
RCP	Safe D	October 31, 2016

==== Endorsements ====
Pete DiCianni (R)

Organizations

- National Republican Congressional Committee "On the Radar" Program

==== Results ====
Illinois's 8th congressional district, 2016
Party	Candidate	Votes	%
Democratic	Raja Krishnamoorthi	144,954	58.3
Republican	Pete DiCianni	103,617	41.7
Total votes		248,571	100.0
Democratic hold			

== District 9 ==
2016 Illinois's 9th congressional district election
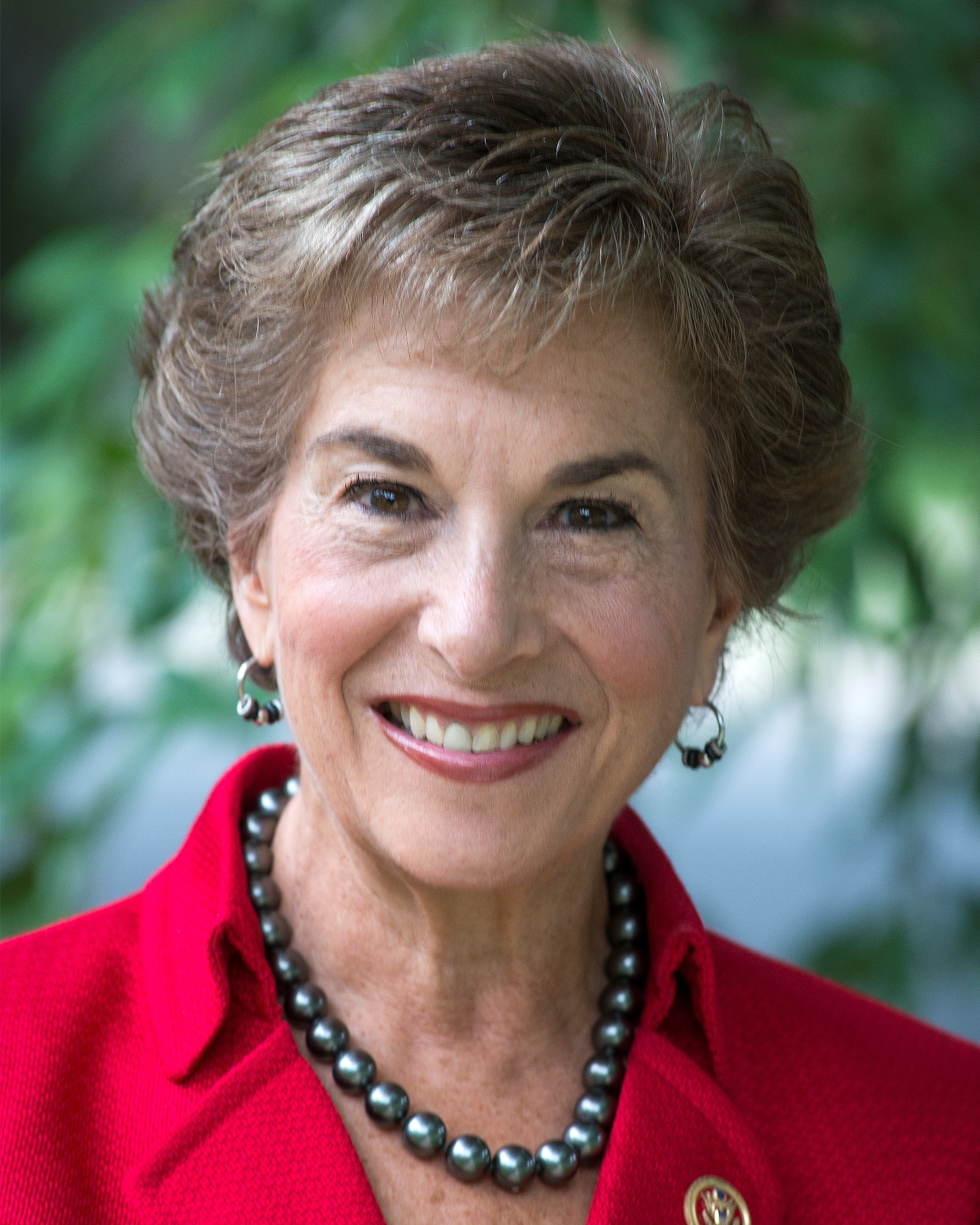

Nominee	Jan Schakowsky	Joan McCarthy Lasonde
Party	Democratic	Republican
Popular vote	217,306	109,550
Percentage	66.5%	33.5%
- County results Schakowsky: 60–70%
U.S. Representative before election
Jan Schakowsky
Democratic
Elected U.S. Representative
Jan Schakowsky
Democratic

The incumbent was Democrat Jan Schakowsky, who had represented the district since 1999. She was re-elected with 66% of the vote in 2014. The district had a PVI of D+15.

=== Democratic primary ===
==== Candidates ====
===== Nominee =====
- Jan Schakowsky, incumbent U.S. representative

==== Primary results ====
Democratic primary results
Party	Candidate	Votes	%
Democratic	Jan Schakowsky (incumbent)	134,961	100.0
Total votes		134,961	100.0

=== Republican primary ===
==== Candidates ====
===== Nominee =====
- Joan McCarthy Lasonde

==== Primary results ====
Republican primary results
Party	Candidate	Votes	%
Republican	Joan McCarthy Lasonde	47,948	100.0
Total votes		47,948	100.0

=== General election ===
==== Endorsements ====
Joan McCarthy Lasonde (R)

U.S. Senators

- Mark Kirk, Illinois

U.S. Representatives

- Rodney Davis, Illinois
- Robert Dold, Illinois
- Darin LaHood, Illinois
- Paul Ryan, Wisconsin, Speaker of the House
- Greg Walden, Oregon, NRCC chairman
- Joe Walsh, Illinois (former) and radio host

State officials

- Leslie Munger, Illinois state comptroller

Organizations

- National Republican Congressional Committee "On the Radar" Program

Newspapers

- Chicago Tribune

Individuals

- Dan Proft, radio host and 2010 Illinois gubernatorial candidate

==== Predictions ====
Source	Ranking	As of
The Cook Political Report	Safe D	November 7, 2016
Daily Kos Elections	Safe D	November 7, 2016
Rothenberg	Safe D	November 3, 2016
Sabato's Crystal Ball	Safe D	November 7, 2016
RCP	Safe D	October 31, 2016

==== Results ====
Illinois's 9th congressional district, 2016
Party	Candidate	Votes	%
Democratic	Jan Schakowsky (incumbent)	217,306	66.5
Republican	Joan McCarthy Lasonde	109,550	33.5
Independent	David Earl Williams III (write-in)	79	0.0
Independent	Susanne Atanus (write-in)	13	0.0
Total votes		326,948	100.0
Democratic hold			

== District 10 ==
2016 Illinois's 10th congressional district election
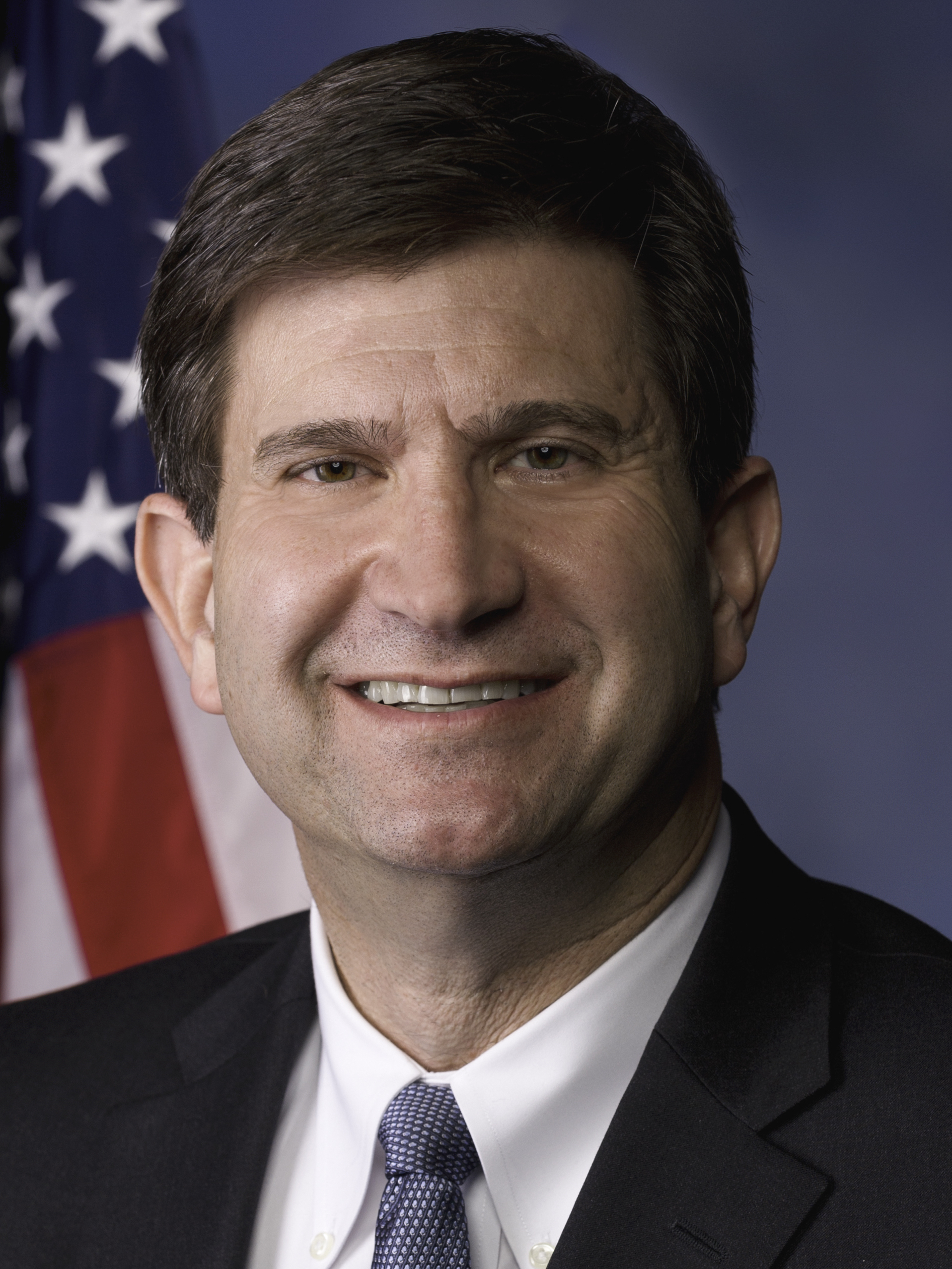

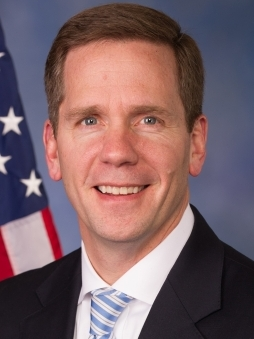
Nominee	Brad Schneider	Bob Dold
Party	Democratic	Republican
Popular vote	150,435	135,535
Percentage	52.6%	47.4%
- County results Schneider: 50–60%
U.S. Representative before election
Bob Dold
Republican
Elected U.S. Representative
Brad Schneider
Democratic

The incumbent was Republican Bob Dold, who had represented the district since 2015 and previously from 2011 to 2013. He was elected with 51% of the vote in 2014, defeating Democratic incumbent Brad Schneider. The district had a PVI of D+8, which made the 10th congressional district the most Democratic district in the country represented by a Republican. As such, Dold was a top Democratic target.

=== Republican primary ===
==== Candidates ====
===== Nominee =====
- Bob Dold, incumbent U.S. representative

==== Primary results ====
Republican primary results 2016
Party	Candidate	Votes	%
Republican	Bob Dold (incumbent)	61,968	100.0
Total votes		61,968	100.0

=== Democratic primary ===
Schneider announced on April 2, 2015, that he would again run for the 10th district against Dold.

==== Candidates ====
===== Nominee =====
- Brad Schneider, former U.S. representative

===== Eliminated in primary =====
- Nancy Rotering, Mayor of Highland Park, Illinois

===== Endorsements =====
Nancy Rotering

U.S. Senators

- Dick Durbin, senator from Illinois (current Senate Minority Whip) and former U.S. representative
- Adlai Stevenson III, former U.S. senator

U.S. Representatives

- Abner Mikva, former U.S. representative, former Court of Appeals Judge and former White House Counsel (formerly represented the 10th District in Congress)

State legislators

- Sara Feigenholtz, Illinois state representative
- Julie Hamos, former Illinois State Representative and candidate for this seat in 2010
- Lou Lang, Illinois State Representative
- Dan Pierce, former Illinois State Representative and former mayor of Highland Park

Organizations

- J Street
- Kenilworth Democrats
- Moraine Democrats
- National Women's Political Caucus
- New Trier Democrats

Newspapers

- Chicago Sun-Times
- Chicago Tribune

Local officials

- David H. Hoffman, former Chicago Inspector General and candidate for U.S. Senate in 2010

Individuals

- Dan Seals, business consultant and nominee for this seat in 2006, 2008, and 2010
Brad Schneider

U.S. Representatives

- Tammy Duckworth, U.S. representative from Illinois (District 8), former Assistant Secretary of Veterans Affairs for Public and Intergovernmental Affairs, former director of the Illinois Department of Veterans Affairs
- Ben Ray Luján, U.S. representative and chairman of the Democratic Congressional Campaign Committee
- Nancy Pelosi, U.S. representative (current House Minority Leader, former Speaker of the House and former House Minority Whip)
- Mike Quigley, U.S. representative from Illinois (District 5) and former member of the Cook County Board of Commissioners
- Debbie Wasserman Schultz, chair of the Democratic National Committee and U.S. representative

State officials

- Jesse White, Illinois Secretary of State, former Illinois State Representative, and former Cook County Recorder of Deeds

State legislators

- Daniel Biss, Illinois state senator
- Marty Moylan, Illinois state representative and former mayor of Des Plaines, Illinois
- John Mulroe, Illinois state senator

Labor unions

- Amalgamated Transit Union
- Illinois Federation of Teachers

Organizations

- Democratic Congressional Campaign Committee
- Waukegan Township Democrats

Newspapers

- Chicago Daily Herald

==== Debate ====
2016 Illinois's 10th congressional district democratic primary debate
No.	Date	Host	Moderator	Link	Democratic	Democratic
Key: P Participant A Absent N Not invited I Invited W Withdrawn						
Key: P Participant A Absent N Not invited I Invited W Withdrawn					Nancy Rotering	Brad Schneider
1	Feb. 28, 2016	Leagues of Women Voters of Deerfield, Glencoe, Glenview, Highland Park, Highwood, Lake Forest and Lake Bluff	Sue Calder	YouTube	P	P

==== Primary results ====
Democratic primary results 2016
Party	Candidate	Votes	%
Democratic	Brad Schneider	50,916	53.7
Democratic	Nancy Rotering	43,842	46.3
Total votes		94,758	100.0

=== General election ===
==== Endorsements ====
Bob Dold (R)

State officials

- John Kasich, Governor of Ohio and 2016 presidential candidate

Organizations

- Human Rights Campaign
- Humane Society Legislative Fund
- National Association of Home Builders
- National Republican Congressional Committee "Patriot" Program

Newspapers

- Chicago Jewish Star
- Chicago Sun-Times
- Chicago Tribune
- Daily Herald

Local officials

- Mark Curran, Lake County Sheriff
Brad Schneider (D)

Organizations

- Democratic Congressional Campaign Committee "Red to Blue" Program

==== Polling ====
Poll source	Date(s) administered	Sample size	Margin of error	Bob Dold (R)	Brad Schneider (D)	Undecided
North Star Opinion Research (R-NRCC)	October 8–11, 2016	400	–	50%	43%	—

==== Predictions ====
Source	Ranking	As of
The Cook Political Report	Tossup	November 7, 2016
Daily Kos Elections	Tossup	November 7, 2016
Rothenberg	Tossup	November 3, 2016
Sabato's Crystal Ball	Lean D (flip)	November 7, 2016
RCP	Tossup	October 31, 2016

==== Results ====
Illinois's 10th congressional district, 2016
Party	Candidate	Votes	%
Democratic	Brad Schneider	150,435	52.6
Republican	Bob Dold (incumbent)	135,535	47.4
Independent	Joseph William Kopsick (write-in)	26	0.0
Total votes		285,996	100.0
Democratic gain from Republican			

== District 11 ==
2016 Illinois's 11th congressional district election
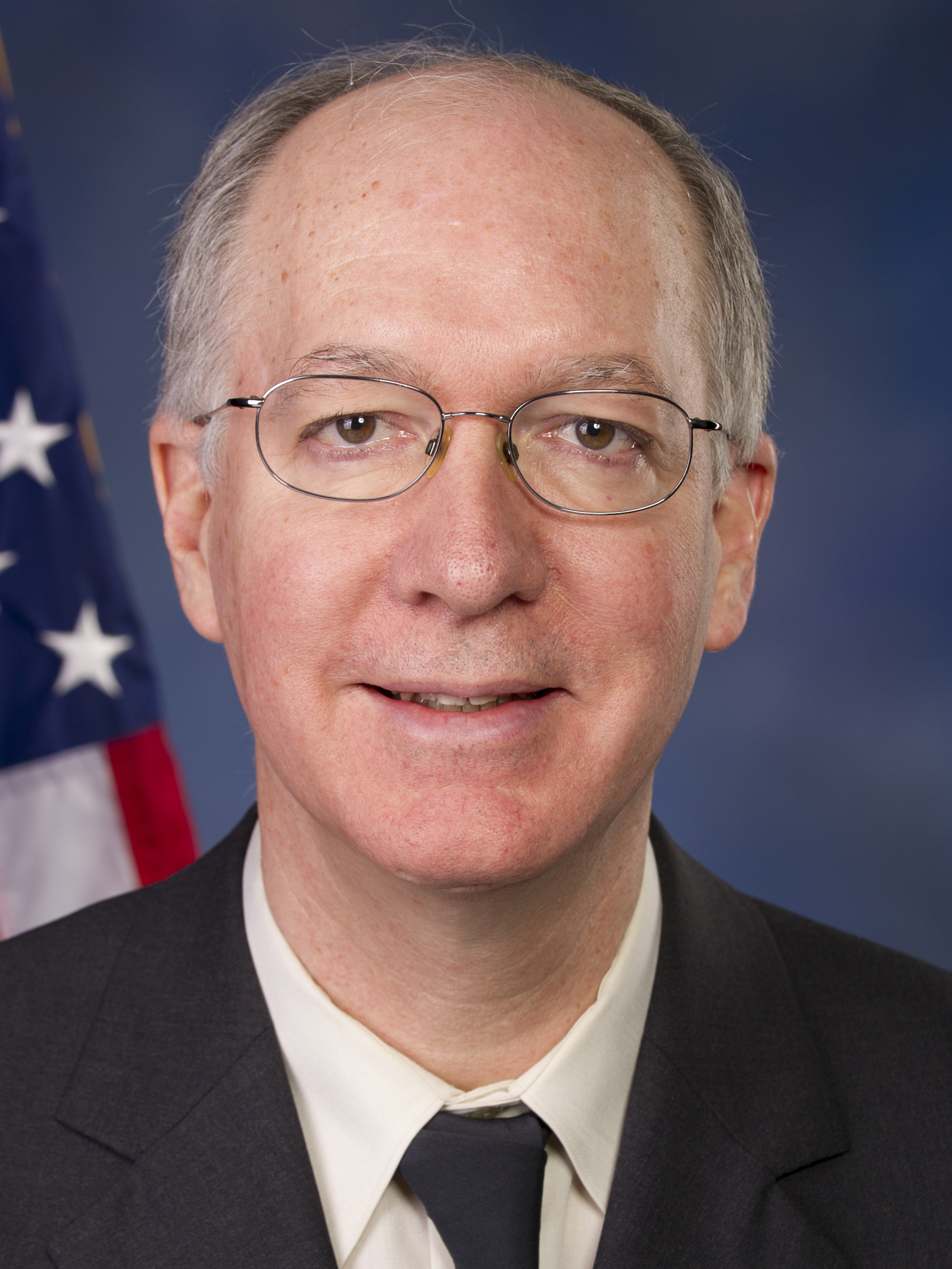

Nominee	Bill Foster	Tonia Khouri
Party	Democratic	Republican
Popular vote	166,578	108,995
Percentage	60.4%	39.6%
- County results Foster: 50–60% 60–70% Khouri: 60–70%
U.S. Representative before election
Bill Foster
Democratic
Elected U.S. Representative
Bill Foster
Democratic

The incumbent was Democrat Bill Foster, who had represented the district since 2013 and previously represented the 14th district from 2008 to 2011. He was re-elected with 53% of the vote in 2014. The district had a PVI of D+8.

Foster considered running for the U.S. Senate, but decided to run for re-election instead.

=== Democratic primary ===
==== Candidates ====
===== Nominee =====
- Bill Foster, incumbent U.S. representative

==== Primary results ====
Democratic primary results
Party	Candidate	Votes	%
Democratic	Bill Foster (incumbent)	82,984	100.0
Total votes		82,984	100.0

=== Republican primary ===
==== Candidates ====
===== Nominee =====
- Tonia Khouri, DuPage County board member

===== Eliminated in primary =====
- Dominick Stella, cardiologist
- Herman White, scientist

===== Endorsements =====
Tonia Khouri

U.S. Representatives

- Diane Black, U.S. representative (R-TN)
- Darin LaHood, U.S. representative (R-IL)
- Peter Roskam, U.S. representative (R-IL)
- John Shimkus, U.S. representative (R-IL)

State officials

- Evelyn Sanguinetti, Lieutenant Governor of Illinois

Organizations

- Maggie's List
- Susan B. Anthony List
Nick Stella

Newspapers

- Chicago Sun-Times
Herman White

Newspapers

- Chicago Tribune

==== Primary results ====
Republican primary results
Party	Candidate	Votes	%
Republican	Tonia Khouri	22,859	37.0
Republican	Nick Stella	22,489	36.3
Republican	Herman White	16,536	26.7
Total votes		61,884	100.0

=== General election ===
==== Endorsements ====
Tonia Khouri (R)

Organizations

- National Republican Congressional Committee "Young Guns" Program

==== Predictions ====
Source	Ranking	As of
The Cook Political Report	Safe D	November 7, 2016
Daily Kos Elections	Safe D	November 7, 2016
Rothenberg	Safe D	November 3, 2016
Sabato's Crystal Ball	Safe D	November 7, 2016
RCP	Safe D	October 31, 2016

==== Results ====
Illinois's 11th congressional district, 2016
Party	Candidate	Votes	%
Democratic	Bill Foster (incumbent)	166,578	60.4
Republican	Tonia Khouri	108,995	39.6
Total votes		275,573	100.0
Democratic hold			

== District 12 ==
2016 Illinois's 12th congressional district election
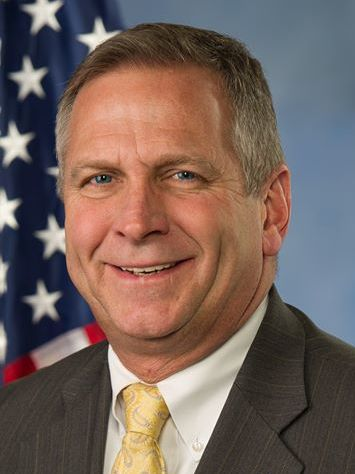

Nominee	Mike Bost	C.J. Baricevic	Paula Bradshaw
Party	Republican	Democratic	Green
Popular vote	169,976	124,246	18,780
Percentage	54.3%	39.7%	6.0%
- County results Bost: 50–60% 60–70% 70–80% Baricevic: 40–50%
U.S. Representative before election
Mike Bost
Republican
Elected U.S. Representative
Mike Bost
Republican

The incumbent was Republican Mike Bost, who had represented the district since 2015. He was elected with 52% of the vote in 2014, defeating Democratic incumbent William Enyart. The district had an even PVI.

=== Republican primary ===
==== Candidates ====
===== Nominee =====
- Mike Bost, incumbent U.S. representative

==== Primary results ====
Republican primary results
Party	Candidate	Votes	%
Republican	Mike Bost (incumbent)	74,454	100.0
Total votes		74,454	100.0

=== Democratic primary ===
Prior to the Democratic primary, international aid worker Edward Vowell had formed an exploratory committee.

==== Candidates ====
===== Nominee =====
- C.J. Baricevic, attorney

===== Declined =====
- Jerry Costello II, state representative
- Jay Hoffman, state representative
- Brendan Kelly, St. Clair County State's Attorney
- Sheila Simon, former lieutenant governor and nominee for Comptroller in 2014
- Edward Vowell, international aid worker
- Rick Watson, St. Clair County Sheriff

==== Primary results ====
Democratic primary results
Party	Candidate	Votes	%
Democratic	C.J. Baricevic	70,580	100.0
Total votes		70,580	100.0

=== Green primary ===
==== Candidates ====
===== Nominee =====
- Paula Bradshaw, nurse, local radio talk show host and nominee for this seat in 2012 & 2014

===== Eliminated in primary =====
- Sadona Folkner

==== Primary results ====
Green primary results
Party	Candidate	Votes	%
Green	Paula Bradshaw	117	80.1
Green	Sadona Folkner	29	19.9
Total votes		146	100.0

=== General election ===
==== Campaign ====
===== FEC complaint =====
On June 28 the Foundation for Accountability and Civic Trust (FACT) filed a complaint with the Federal Elections Commission with allegations of election illegality involving the Baricevic campaign.

==== Endorsements ====
Mike Bost (R)

Organizations

- National Republican Congressional Committee "Patriot" Program

==== Predictions ====
Source	Ranking	As of
The Cook Political Report	Likely R	November 7, 2016
Daily Kos Elections	Likely R	November 7, 2016
Rothenberg	Safe R	November 3, 2016
Sabato's Crystal Ball	Likely R	November 7, 2016
RCP	Likely R	October 31, 2016

==== Results ====
Bost defeated Baricevic and Bradshaw in the general election on November 8, 2016, winning 54% of the vote.

Illinois's 12th congressional district, 2016
Party	Candidate	Votes	%
Republican	Mike Bost (incumbent)	169,976	54.3
Democratic	C.J. Baricevic	124,246	39.7
Green	Paula Bradshaw	18,780	6.0
Total votes		313,002	100.0
Republican hold			

== District 13 ==
2016 Illinois's 13th congressional district election
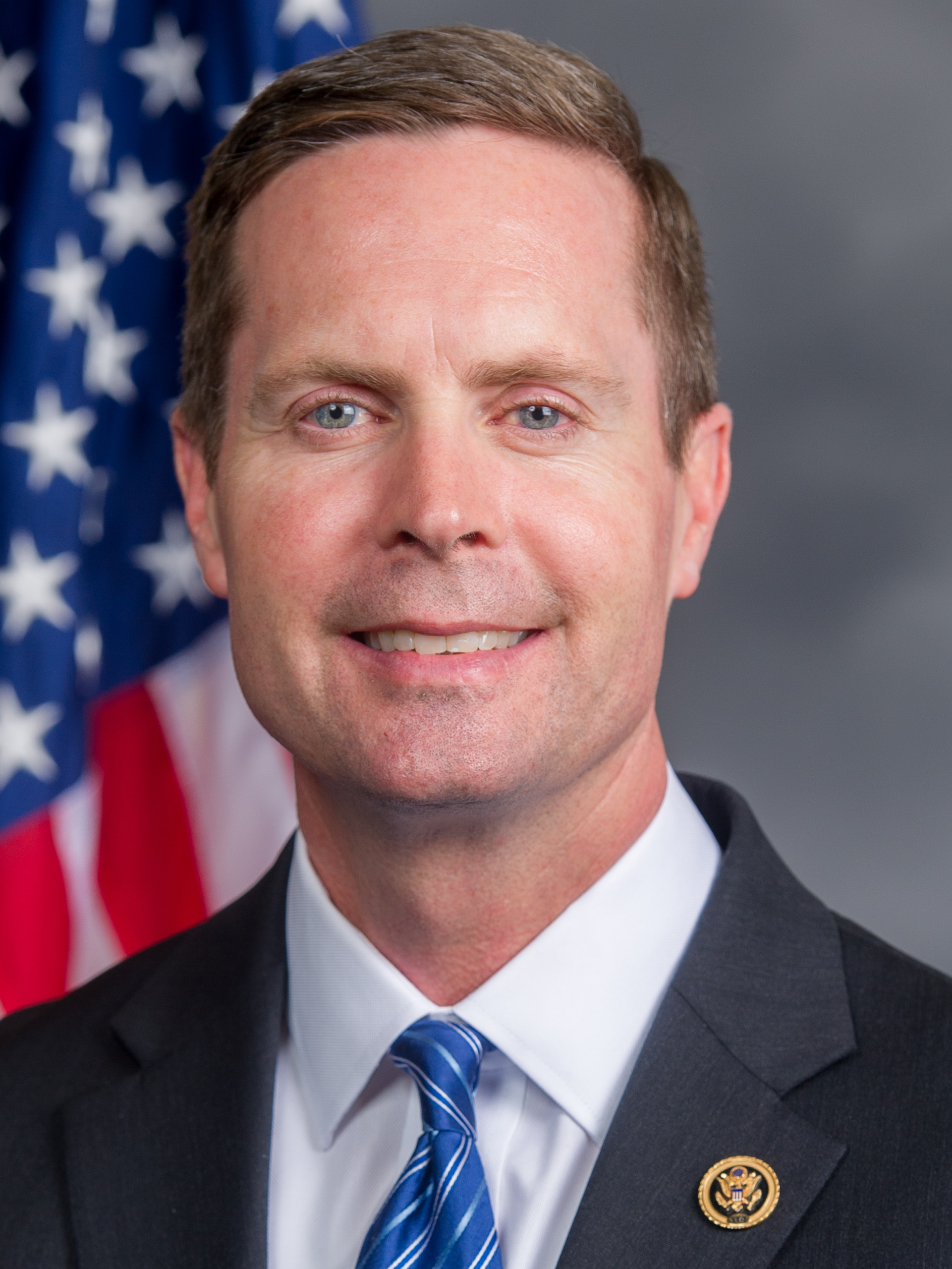

Nominee	Rodney Davis	Mark Wicklund
Party	Republican	Democratic
Popular vote	187,583	126,811
Percentage	59.7%	40.3%
- County results Davis: 50–60% 60–70% 70–80% 80–90% Wicklund: 50–60%
U.S. Representative before election
Rodney Davis
Republican
Elected U.S. Representative
Rodney Davis
Republican

The incumbent was Republican Rodney L. Davis, who had represented the district since 2013. He was re-elected with 59% of the vote in 2014. The district had an even PVI. Davis ran for re-election.

=== Republican primary ===
==== Candidates ====
===== Nominee =====
- Rodney Davis, incumbent U.S. representative

===== Eliminated in primary =====
- Ethan Vandersand, pharmacist

===== Endorsements =====
Rodney Davis

Newspapers

- Chicago Tribune

==== Primary results ====
Republican primary results
Party	Candidate	Votes	%
Republican	Rodney L. Davis (incumbent)	71,447	77.0
Republican	Ethan Vandersand	21,401	23.0
Total votes		92,848	100.0

=== Democratic primary ===
==== Candidates ====
===== Nominee =====
- Mark Wicklund, president of the Decatur-Macon County Opportunities Corporation and former Macon County Board member

===== Declined =====
- Tom Banning, Assistant Illinois Attorney General
- Tony DelGiorno, Sangamon County Board Member
- David Gill, physician and nominee in 2004, 2006, 2010, and 2012 (running as Independent)
- Andy Manar, state senator
- Julia Rietz, Champaign County State's Attorney

==== Primary results ====
Democratic primary results
Party	Candidate	Votes	%
Democratic	Mark Wicklund	71,430	100.0
Total votes		71,430	100.0

=== Independents ===
Physician David Gill, the Democratic nominee for this district in 2004, 2006, 2010, and 2012 announced that he would make a fifth run, but as an independent this time. In order to qualify for the general election ballot, Gill needed to file nomination papers by June 27, 2016.

=== General election ===
==== Endorsements ====
Rodney Davis (R)

Organizations

- National Republican Congressional Committee "Patriot" Program

==== Predictions ====
Source	Ranking	As of
The Cook Political Report	Safe R	November 7, 2016
Daily Kos Elections	Safe R	November 7, 2016
Rothenberg	Safe R	November 3, 2016
Sabato's Crystal Ball	Safe R	November 7, 2016
RCP	Safe R	October 31, 2016

==== Results ====
Illinois's 13th congressional district, 2016
Party	Candidate	Votes	%
Republican	Rodney L. Davis (incumbent)	187,583	59.7
Democratic	Mark Wicklund	126,811	40.3
Total votes		314,394	100.0
Republican hold			

== District 14 ==
2016 Illinois's 14th congressional district election
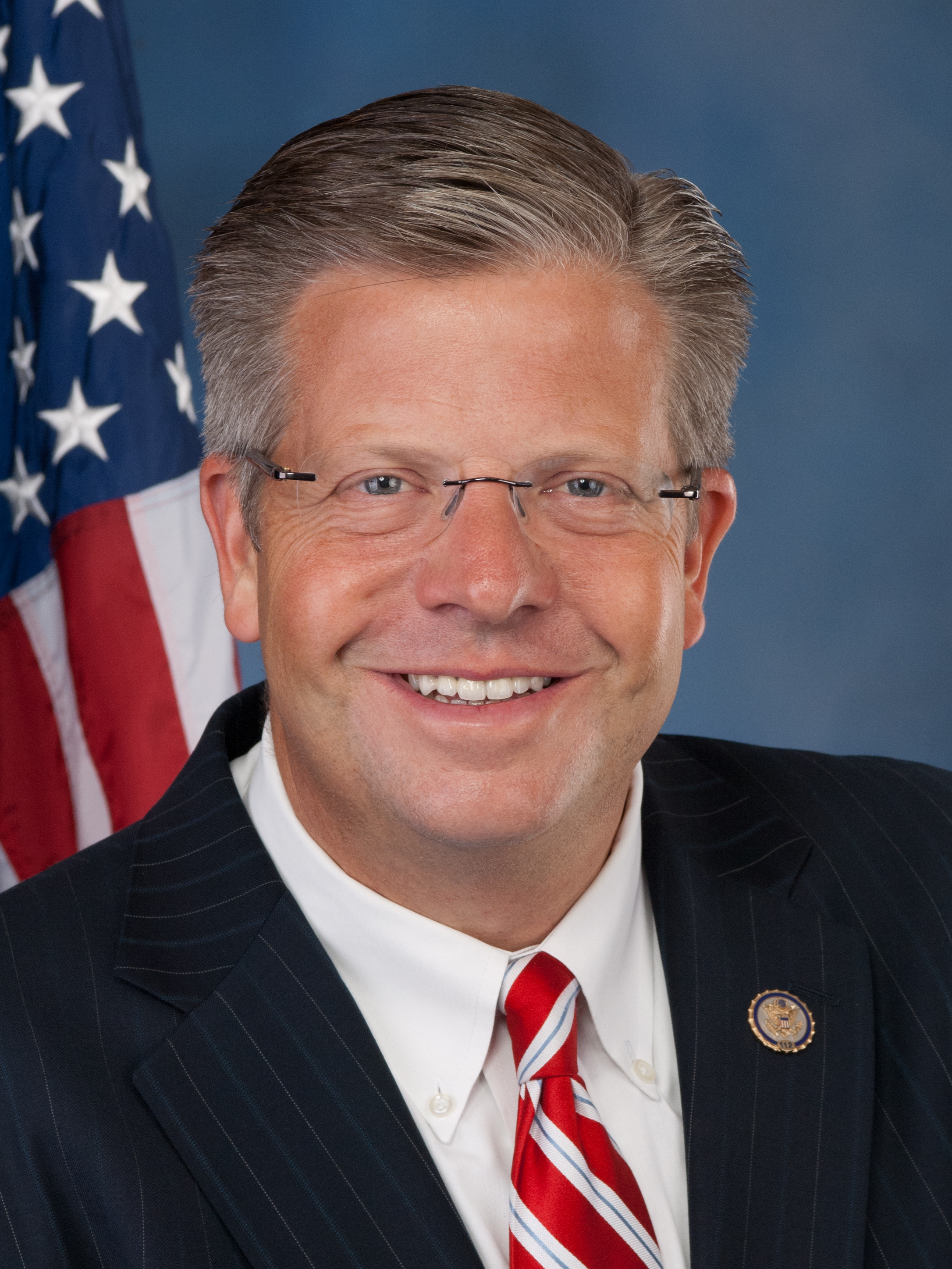

Nominee	Randy Hultgren	Jim Walz
Party	Republican	Democratic
Popular vote	200,508	137,589
Percentage	59.3%	40.7%
- County results Hultgren: 50–60% 60–70% Walz: 50–60%
U.S. Representative before election
Randy Hultgren
Republican
Elected U.S. Representative
Randy Hultgren
Republican

The incumbent was Republican Randy Hultgren, who had represented the district since 2011. He was re-elected with 65% of the vote in 2014. The district had a PVI of R+5.

=== Republican primary ===
Joe Walsh, former Republican representative for Illinois's 8th congressional district from 2011 to 2013 and radio talk show host on 560 AM considered a primary bid against Hultgren. Walsh did not file to run, leaving Hultgren unopposed for the Republican nomination.

==== Candidates ====
===== Nominee =====
- Randy Hultgren, incumbent U.S. representative

===== Declined =====
- Joe Walsh, former U.S. representative

==== Primary results ====
Republican primary results
Party	Candidate	Votes	%
Republican	Randy Hultgren (incumbent)	101,299	100.0
Total votes		101,299	100.0

=== Democratic primary ===
==== Candidates ====
===== Nominee =====
- Jim Walz

===== Eliminated in primary =====
- John Hosta
- Jesse Maggitt

===== Endorsements =====
Jim Walz

Newspapers

- Chicago Sun-Times
- Chicago Tribune

==== Primary results ====
Democratic primary results
Party	Candidate	Votes	%
Democratic	Jim Walz	27,706	42.7
Democratic	John Hosta	24,866	38.3
Democratic	Jesse Maggitt	12,311	19.0
Total votes		64,883	100.0

=== General election ===
==== Predictions ====
Source	Ranking	As of
The Cook Political Report	Safe R	November 7, 2016
Daily Kos Elections	Safe R	November 7, 2016
Rothenberg	Safe R	November 3, 2016
Sabato's Crystal Ball	Safe R	November 7, 2016
RCP	Safe R	October 31, 2016

==== Results ====
Illinois's 14th congressional district, 2016
Party	Candidate	Votes	%
Republican	Randy Hultgren (incumbent)	200,508	59.3
Democratic	Jim Walz	137,589	40.7
Total votes		338,097	100.0
Republican hold			

== District 15 ==
2016 Illinois's 15th congressional district election
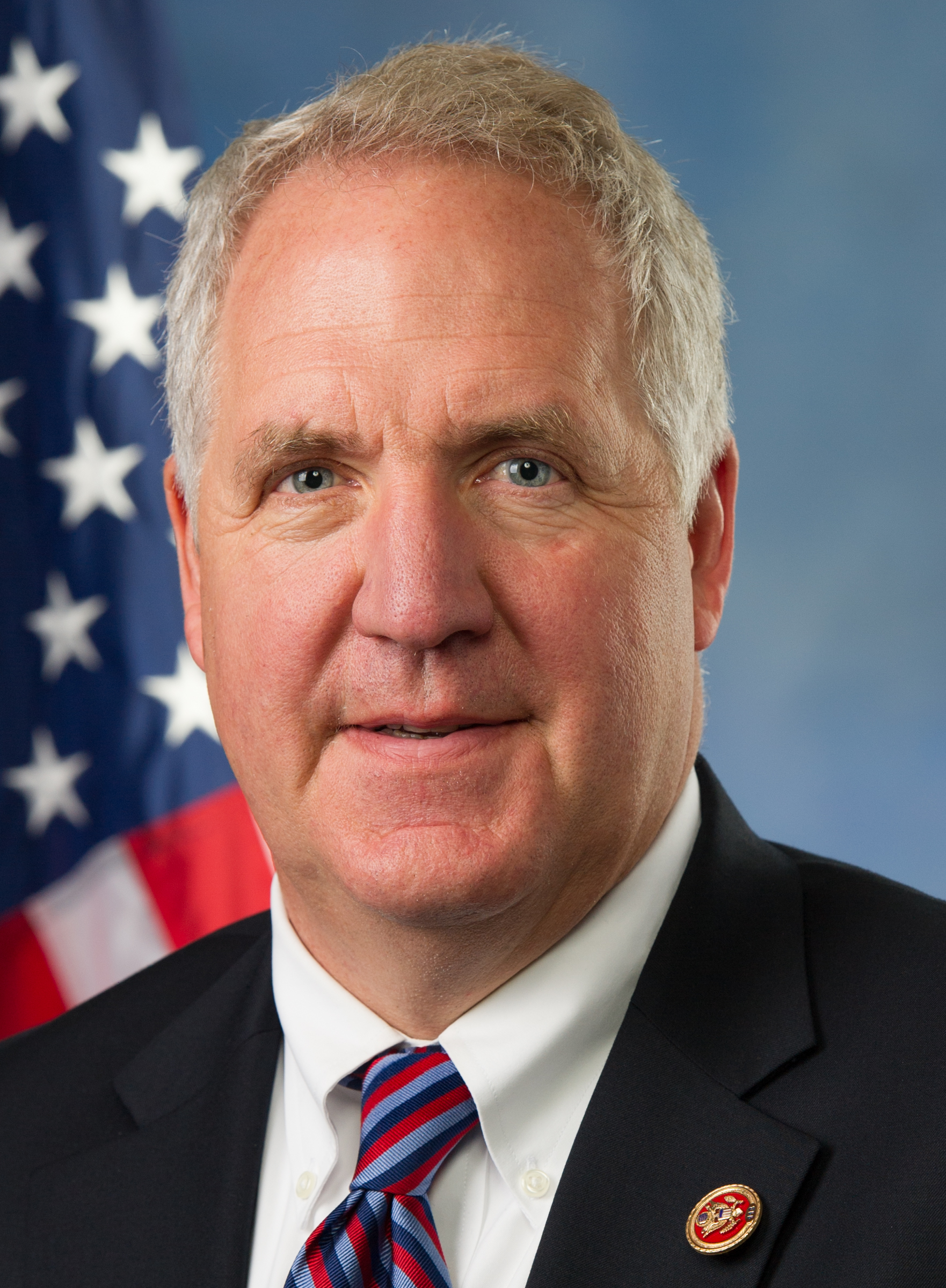
Nominee	John Shimkus
Party	Republican
Popular vote	274,554
Percentage	100.0%
U.S. Representative before election
John Shimkus
Republican
Elected U.S. Representative
John Shimkus
Republican

The incumbent was Republican John Shimkus, who had represented the district since 2013 and previously represented the 19th district from 2003 to 2013 and the 20th district from 1997 to 2003. He was re-elected with 74% of the vote in 2014. The district had a PVI of R+14. Shimkus ran for re-election.

=== Republican primary ===
State Senator Kyle McCarter unsuccessfully challenged Shimkus from the right.

==== Candidates ====
===== Nominee =====
- John Shimkus, incumbent U.S. representative

===== Eliminated in primary =====
- Kyle McCarter, state senator

===== Endorsements =====
John Shimkus

State officials

- Bruce Rauner, Governor of Illinois

Newspapers

- Chicago Tribune
Kyle McCarter

Organizations

- Club for Growth

==== Primary results ====
Republican primary results
Party	Candidate	Votes	%
Republican	John Shimkus (incumbent)	76,547	60.4
Republican	Kyle McCarter	50,245	39.6
Total votes		126,792	100.0

=== Democratic primary ===
No candidates filed for the Democratic primary for this seat.

=== General election ===
==== Predictions ====
Source	Ranking	As of
The Cook Political Report	Safe R	November 7, 2016
Daily Kos Elections	Safe R	November 7, 2016
Rothenberg	Safe R	November 3, 2016
Sabato's Crystal Ball	Safe R	November 7, 2016
RCP	Safe R	October 31, 2016

==== Results ====
Illinois's 15th congressional district, 2016
Party	Candidate	Votes	%
Republican	John Shimkus (incumbent)	274,554	100.0
Total votes		274,554	100.0
Republican hold			

== District 16 ==
2016 Illinois's 16th congressional district election
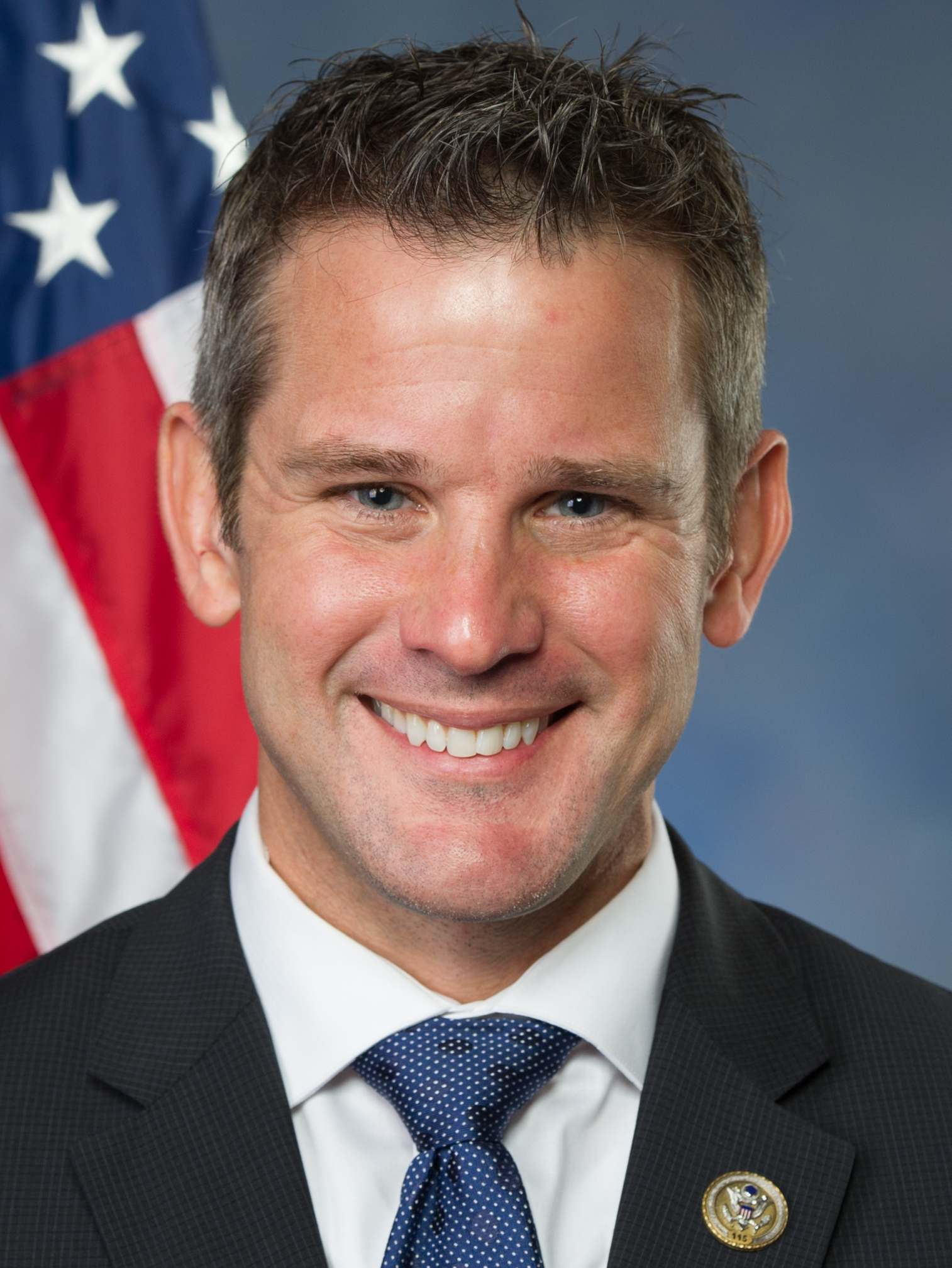
Nominee	Adam Kinzinger
Party	Republican
Popular vote	259,853
Percentage	100%
- County results Kinzinger: 90–100% 100–100%
U.S. Representative before election
Adam Kinzinger
Republican
Elected U.S. Representative
Adam Kinzinger
Republican

The incumbent was Republican Adam Kinzinger, who had represented the district since 2013 and previously represented the 11th district from 2011 to 2013. He was re-elected with 71% of the vote in 2014. The district had a PVI of R+4.

=== Republican primary ===
Congressman Adam Kinzinger was considered a possible candidate for the U.S. Senate if Republican senator Mark Kirk had decided not to run again. However, Senator Kirk ended up filing for re-election and Kinzinger remained running for re-election.

Colin McGroarty announced on July 16, 2015, at a meeting of the Northern Illinois Tea Party that he would challenge Kinzinger for the Republican nomination.

==== Candidates ====
===== Nominee =====
- Adam Kinzinger, incumbent U.S. representative

===== Removed =====
- Colin McGroarty, technology consultant and Tea Party activist

==== Primary results ====
Republican primary results
Party	Candidate	Votes	%
Republican	Adam Kinzinger (incumbent)	101,421	100.0
Republican	Colin McGroarty (write-in)	2	0.0
Total votes		101,423	100.0

=== Democratic primary ===
No candidates filed for the Democratic primary for this seat.

=== General election ===
==== Predictions ====
Source	Ranking	As of
The Cook Political Report	Safe R	November 7, 2016
Daily Kos Elections	Safe R	November 7, 2016
Rothenberg	Safe R	November 3, 2016
Sabato's Crystal Ball	Safe R	November 7, 2016
RCP	Safe R	October 31, 2016

==== Results ====
Illinois's 16th congressional district, 2016
Party	Candidate	Votes	%
Republican	Adam Kinzinger (incumbent)	259,722	99.9
Independent	John Burchardt (write-in)	131	0.1
Total votes		259,853	100.0
Republican hold			

== District 17 ==
2016 Illinois's 17th congressional district election
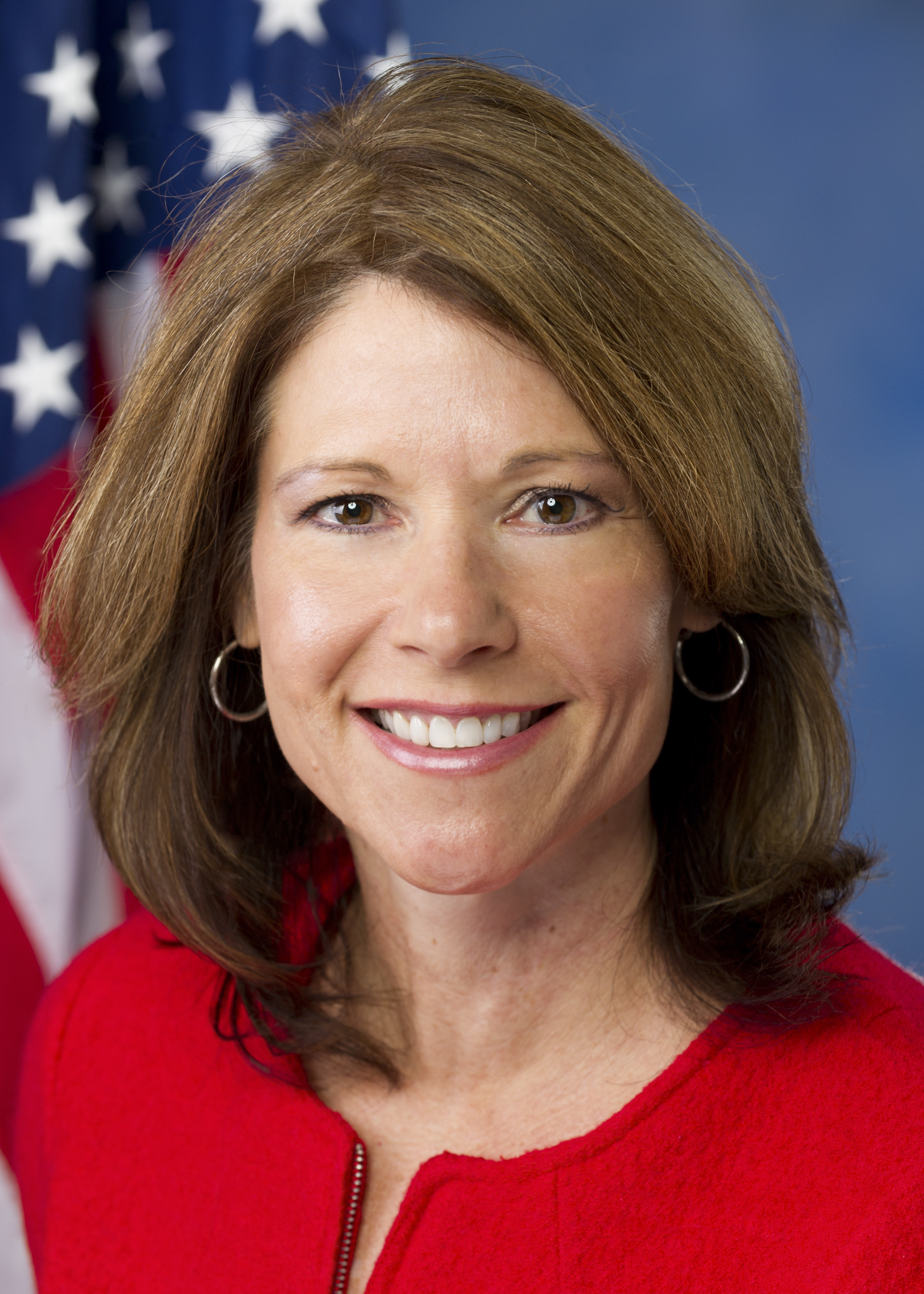

Nominee	Cheri Bustos	Patrick Harlan
Party	Democratic	Republican
Popular vote	173,125	113,943
Percentage	60.3%	39.7%
- County results Bustos: 50–60% 60–70% 70–80%
U.S. Representative before election
Cheri Bustos
Democratic
Elected U.S. Representative
Cheri Bustos
Democratic

The incumbent was Democrat Cheri Bustos, who had represented the district since 2013. She was re-elected with 55% of the vote in 2014. The district had a PVI of D+7.

Bustos considered running for the U.S. Senate, but decided to run for re-election instead.

=== Democratic primary ===
==== Candidates ====
===== Nominee =====
- Cheri Bustos, incumbent U.S. representative

==== Primary results ====
Democratic primary results
Party	Candidate	Votes	%
Democratic	Cheri Bustos (incumbent)	70,319	100.0
Total votes		70,319	100.0

=== Republican primary ===
==== Candidates ====
===== Nominee =====
- Patrick Harlan, fuel truck driver and president of the Knox County Tea Party

===== Eliminated in primary =====
- Jack Boccarossa, retired engineer and tree farm owner

===== Endorsements =====
Jack Boccarossa

Newspapers

- Chicago Tribune

==== Primary results ====
Republican primary results
Party	Candidate	Votes	%
Republican	Patrick Harlan	52,405	75.7
Republican	Jack Boccarossa	16,805	24.3
Total votes		69,210	100.0

=== General election ===
==== Endorsements ====
Cheri Bustos (D)

Organizations

- Democratic Congressional Campaign Committee "Frontline" Program
- EMILY's List

==== Predictions ====
Source	Ranking	As of
The Cook Political Report	Safe D	November 7, 2016
Daily Kos Elections	Safe D	November 7, 2016
Rothenberg	Safe D	November 3, 2016
Sabato's Crystal Ball	Safe D	November 7, 2016
RCP	Likely D	October 31, 2016

==== Results ====
Illinois's 17th congressional district, 2016
Party	Candidate	Votes	%
Democratic	Cheri Bustos (incumbent)	173,125	60.3
Republican	Patrick Harlan	113,943	39.7
Total votes		287,068	100.0
Democratic hold			

== District 18 ==
2016 Illinois's 18th congressional district election
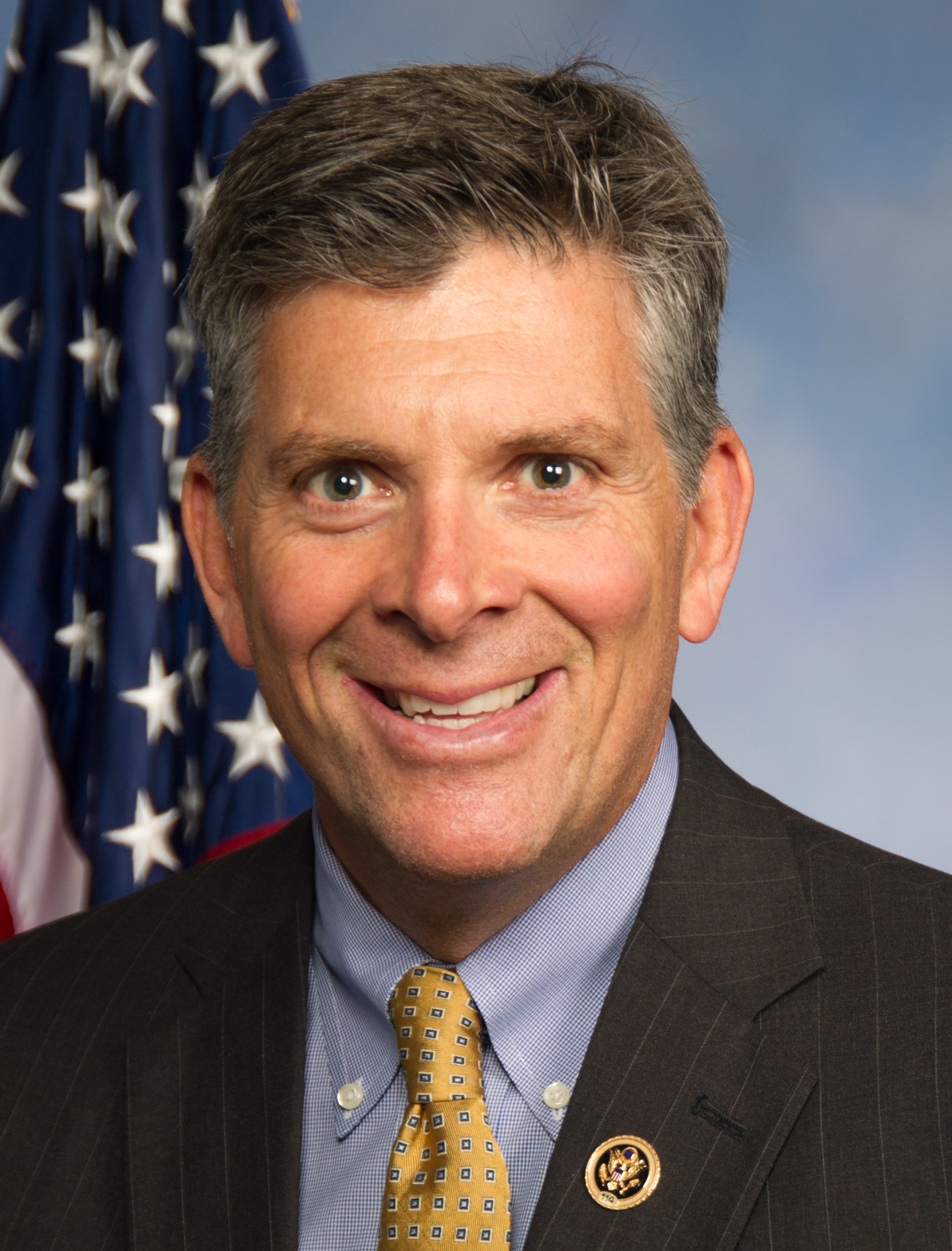

Nominee	Darin LaHood	Junius Rodriguez
Party	Republican	Democratic
Popular vote	250,506	96,770
Percentage	72.1%	27.9%
- County results LaHood: 60–70% 70–80% 80–90%
U.S. Representative before election
Darin LaHood
Republican
Elected U.S. Representative
Darin LaHood
Republican

The incumbent was Republican Darin LaHood, who had represented the district since 2015. He was elected with 69% of the vote in the September 10, 2015 special election to fill the remainder of the term of former Congressman Aaron Schock. Aaron Schock, who had represented the district since 2009 resigned March 31, 2015 due to controversy over his spending. The district had a PVI of R+11.

=== Republican primary ===
Mark Zalcman, a Normal, Illinois attorney, planned to challenge Schock in the Republican primary election in March 2016. Zalcman promoted a platform based on his Christian Gospel-centered faith and values. Zalcman declined to run in the special election due to a shortened period to obtain the necessary signatures to qualify for the ballot. Zalcman announced that he would focus on the 2016 primary instead. Zalcman did not file for this seat, leaving LaHood unopposed for the Republican nomination.

==== Candidates ====
===== Nominee =====
- Darin LaHood, incumbent U.S. representative

===== Declined =====
- Mark Zalcman, attorney

==== Primary results ====
Republican primary results
Party	Candidate	Votes	%
Republican	Darin LaHood (incumbent)	130,419	100.0
Total votes		130,419	100.0

=== Democratic primary ===
No candidates filed for the Democratic primary for this seat.

==== Write-in ====
- Darrel Miller

==== Primary results ====
Democratic primary results
Party	Candidate	Votes	%
Democratic	Darrel Miller (write-in)	148	100.0
Total votes		148	100.0

=== General election ===
==== Predictions ====
Source	Ranking	As of
The Cook Political Report	Safe R	November 7, 2016
Daily Kos Elections	Safe R	November 7, 2016
Rothenberg	Safe R	November 3, 2016
Sabato's Crystal Ball	Safe R	November 7, 2016
RCP	Safe R	October 31, 2016

==== Results ====
Illinois's 18th congressional district, 2016
Party	Candidate	Votes	%
Republican	Darin LaHood (incumbent)	250,506	72.1
Democratic	Junius Rodriguez	96,770	27.9
Independent	Don Vance (write-in)	7	0.0
Total votes		347,283	100.0
Republican hold			
