= Javier Salas =

Javier Salas may refer to:

- Javier Salas (broadcaster), American media personality and politician
- Javier Salas (footballer) (born 1993), Mexican footballer
