= Herman Brenner White =

American physicist (born 1948)

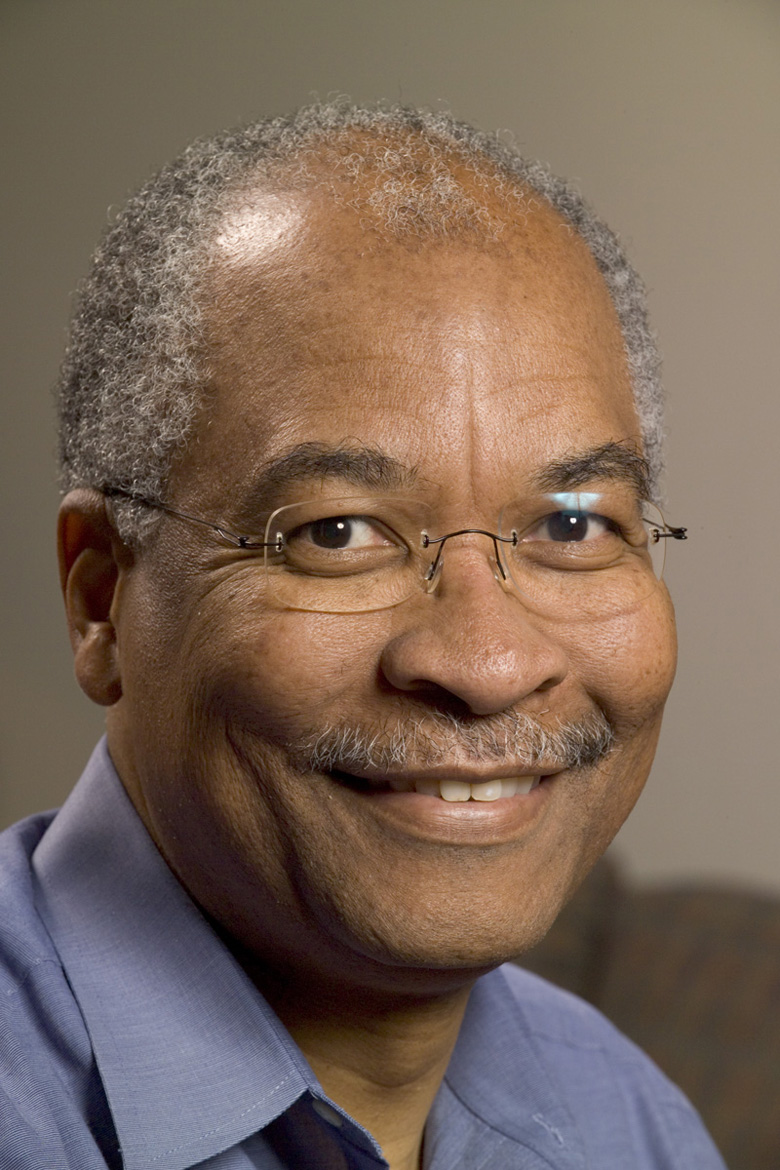
- White in Fermilab in 2005
- Born: 28 September 1948 (age 77)
- Education: Michigan State University Florida State University Earlham College
- Scientific career
- Workplaces: Fermilab; North Central College

Herman Brenner White (born 28 September 1948) is an American physicist who works at Fermilab. He won the 2010 American Physical Society Edward A Bouchet Award and became a fellow of the American Physical Society in 2025.

== Early life and education ==
White was born in Tuskegee, Alabama. His mother, Susie Mae Fort White, worked at John Andrew Hospital and his father, Herman Brenner White Senior, served in the military. He studied at the Tuskegee Institute High School, where he became interested in nuclear engineering. He was raised in a segregated community. He saw his role in the civil rights movement as being an exceptional student who could prove that black people deserved equal access to education. He studied nuclear physics at Earlham College, before joining Michigan State University, earning a bachelor's degree in physics in 1970. White was awarded an Alfred P. Sloan Foundation Fellowship to study at CERN, and also worked as a research associate at Argonne National Laboratory. He completed his master's degree in 1974. He joined Fermilab in 1974, where he was the first African-American physicist to be appointed.

== Research and career ==
White held various roles at Fermilab since joining in 1974. Working with his supervisor, Ray Stefanski, he developed a simple formula to calculate neutrino flux. In 1976 he joined Yale University as a research fellow. He joined Florida State University for his doctoral studies, earning a PhD in 1991. He joined the Universidad Autónoma de San Luis Potosí to work on kaons. In 1994, White was appointed the Illinois Research Corridor Fellow and adjunct professor at North Central College. He also worked on the neutrino oscillation experiment (E701) and SciBooNE. He studies neutrino cross-sections and muon conversion. In 2006 his life story was recorded by the HistoryMakers of Chicago as part of the oral history archives.

White supports students from diverse backgrounds in their careers in physics. In 2010 White was awarded the American Physical Society Edward A. Bouchet Award for his work on the Tevatron experiment and outstanding public service. He serves on the advisory board for QuarkNet, National Society of Black Physicists and the Illinois Institute of Technology. He is a member of the Teachers Academy for Mathematics and Science in Chicago. He served on the advisory panel for the United States Department of Energy and National Science Foundation. He ran for congress in the 11th congressional district of Illinois in 2016. In 2017 he appeared in a series of online videos for Science the Day!. He took part in The Story Collider in Batavia, Illinois in 2018. In 2025, he became a fellow of the American Physical Society "For inspiring leadership and advocacy for physics, science education, and communication with policy makers, governments and the public, and for outstanding contributions to several areas of high energy physics."
