= Javier Salas (broadcaster) =

Mexican American politician

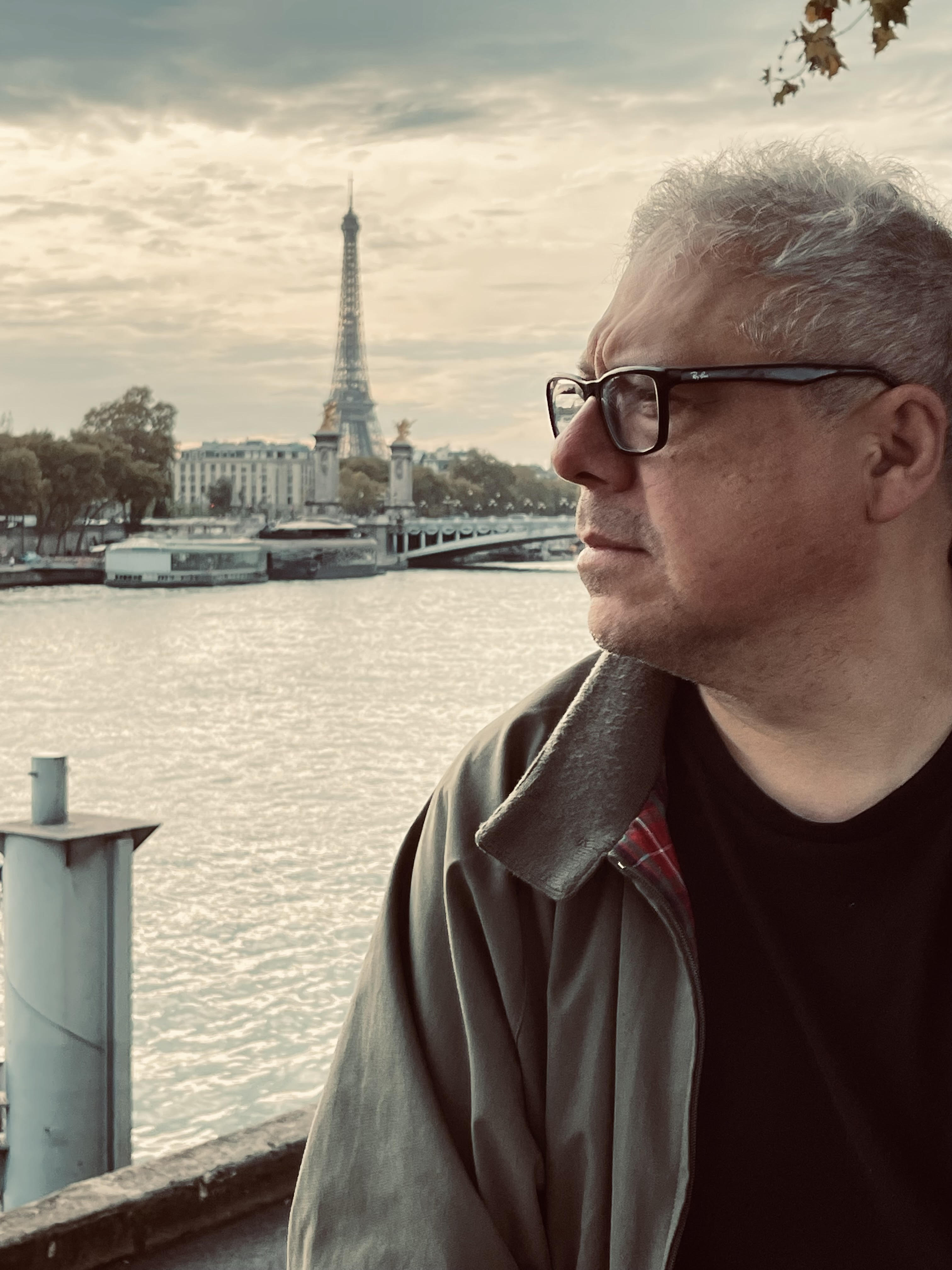
- Born: Mexico City, Mexico
- Political party: Democratic
- Website: Official website

Javier Salas is an American media personality and politician. Salas challenged incumbent Luis Gutiérrez in the Democratic primary for U.S. Representative for Illinois's 4th congressional district.

== Early life ==
Born in Mexico City, Salas immigrated to the United States at the age of 26, working an assortment of factory, restaurant, and radio jobs while pursuing a college degree.

== Media career ==
Before announcing his intention to run for Congress, Salas was working with a variety of Chicago media entities, including local radio station WLEY-FM, as a broadcaster; Hoy!, as a weekly columnist; and WOCK-TV's Noticias MundoFox, as a contributing commentator. Salas is best known for his work on Univision's "Un Nuevo Día". As a host, Salas won an Emmy and was nominated for a Marconi Award.

== Political activities ==
In 2013, Illinois Governor Pat Quinn named Salas a senior policy advisor. In that role, Salas focused his attention on policies related to the Hispanic community, small business growth, and immigration issues. Javier recently ran for the first time for the 4th Congressional District in IL obtaining 25% of the vote. In his role as Senior Advisor to the Governor, Javier helps the Governor and the State of Illinois on social and economic issues, particularly ones that affect the immigrant communities in Illinois. Javier’s goal in radio was to empower his Latino community by informing and debating issues. He was one of the radio hosts who, along with other grass roots community groups, organized hundreds of thousands of pro-immigrant supporters to march in Chicago in 2006. Javier was fundamental in promoting and collecting signatures for the initial Dream Act in 2007 by Illinois Senator Dick Durbin. He also lobbied with hundreds of families in Springfield for drivers licenses for undocumented in Illinois, a benefit that was supported by the Governor and which the state began implementing in 2013.

In 2015, Salas, along with other leaders and activists, organized the first protest against then-presidential candidate Donald Trump in Chicago following his remarks characterizing most immigrants from Mexico as undesirables.

== Personal life ==
Salas lives in Chicago with his wife, Roberta, and their children, Inez and Seymour. He currently teaches as a professor at the City Colleges of Chicago while continuing to advocate for immigration reform and Latino issues.

== Electoral history ==
Illinois's 4th congressional district Democratic Primary, 2016
Party	Candidate	Votes	%
Democratic	Luis Gutiérrez (incumbent)	90,933	75.2
Democratic	Javier Salas	29,938	24.8
Total votes		120,871	100.0
