= Pennsylvania Transportation Institute =

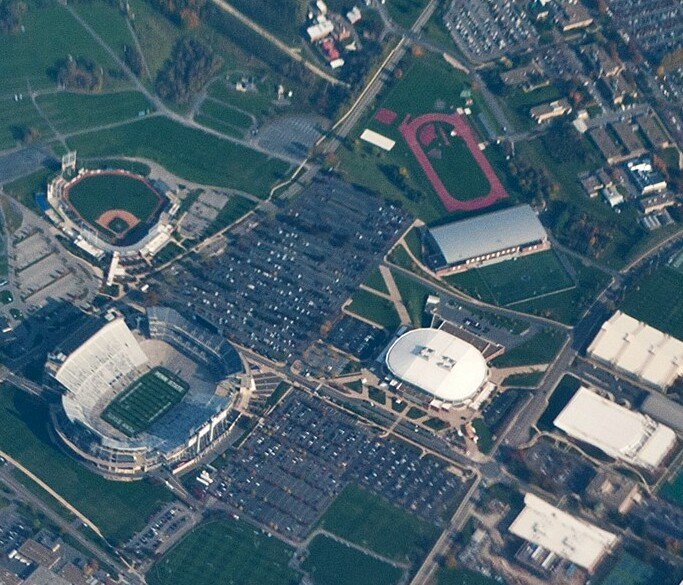
- Aerial photograph of the University Park athletic complex in 2014. Beaver Stadium is in the bottom-left corner of this photograph; the upper-right corner includes the flattened red oval track. The Transportation Research Building is the first building near the track, along the path leading right (south) from the middle of the track.
- Established: 1968
- Address: 201 Transportation Research Building; University Park, Pennsylvania, United States
- Location: Pennsylvania State University
- Coordinates: 40.80656°N 77.84985°W
- Interactive map of Pennsylvania Transportation Institute
- Website: http://www.larson.psu.edu/

The Pennsylvania Transportation Institute (PTI), officially known as the Thomas D. Larson Pennsylvania Transportation Institute or Larson Transportation Institute (LTI), is a research unit of Penn State University's College of Engineering located on Penn State'sUniversity Park campus. The PTI was founded in 1968 and renamed in 2008 for Thomas D. Larson, its first director and major benefactor.

== History ==
The predecessor of the PTI was the Transportation Studies Committee, formed at Penn State in 1966 to recognize a need to facilitate interdisciplinary studies and collaboration on transportation and infrastructure; the six members of the Committee included three professors who would go on to found the Pennsylvania Transportation and Traffic Safety Center on February 23, 1968: Tom Larson, civil engineering; Wolfgang Meyer, mechanical engineering; and Bob Pashek, business logistics. Professor Larson, serving as the PTTSC's first director, stated a vision for the organization in the April 1969 Status Report: "A major goal for the future and within the basic objectives of the Center is the evolution of an organization and method of operation compatible with the academic goals of this University and still comparable in terms of efficiency and creativeness with commercial research groups. This requires that the Center be, in fact, a Center rather than simply an office for the administration of contracts. The philosophy of the University and the inclination of the staff appear to support this kind of development."

Early projects at PTTSC included the Pavement Durability Research Facility (construction started 1971) and a prestressed concrete bridge, which was built and tested to failure between 1971 and 1974. In 1974, the center was renamed to the Pennsylvania Transportation Institute. PTI entered a partnership with PennDOT in 1983 to form the Local Technical Assistance Program. The Mid-Atlantic Universities Transportation Center (MAUTC) was established in 1987, followed by the Altoona Bus Research and Testing Center (BRTC) in 1989. BRTC tests all transit buses before their commercial availability. MAUTC and PennDOT entered a partnership in 1993, which led to the establishment of the Northeast Superpave Center in 1995, which has since been renamed the Northeast Center of Excellence for Pavement Technology (NECEPT).

The Graduate Automotive Technology Education (GATE) Center was established in 1999 to focus on alternative energy storage systems, including the Air Products Hydrogen Fueling Station (installed in 2005). In addition, the Penn State College of Engineering acquired space for what is now the Civil Infrastructure Testing and Evaluation Laboratory (CITEL) in 2003. In 2008, the PTI was renamed to the Larson Transportation Institute by the Penn State Board of Trustees, recognizing Larson's contributions.

== Structure and facilities ==
Key facilities of the Larson Transportation Institute
1 Main campus: 201 Transportation Research Bldg / University Park
2 Bus Research and Testing Center: 2237 Plank Rd / Duncansville
3 LTI Test Track: 164 Test Track Rd / Bellefonte

The institute consists of:

- Transportation Infrastructure Program
- Transportation Operations Program
- Vehicle Systems and Safety Program
- Bus Research and Testing Center (BRTC), in Altoona
- Center for Dirt and Gravel Road Studies (CDGRS)
- Mid-Atlantic Universities Transportation Center (MAUTC) - lead university of six in the program
- Northeast Center of Excellence for Pavement Technology (NECEPT)

=== Main campus (University Park) ===
Most of the LTI research and program administration are located on the main campus in University Park. The Transportation Research Building is directly south of the track and field facility.

=== Bus Research and Testing Center ===
Section 317 of the Surface Transportation and Uniform Relocation Assistance Act of 1987 (STURAA) established a new requirement to test transit buses before releasing federal funds to assist with the purchase, starting in 1989; this rule was subsequently modified by the Intermodal Surface Transportation Efficiency Act of 1991. Additional changes established the service life categories for transit buses in 1993; these included heavy-duty large buses (12 years or 500,000 mi (800,000 km), 35–40 ft (11–12 m) long and articulated buses) and heavy-duty small buses (10 years or 350,000 mi (560,000 km), approximately 30 ft (9.1 m) long) as well as lighter-duty vehicles. The federally-mandated testing of transit buses at BRTC includes multiple criteria for evaluation, including safety, structural integrity, durability, performance, maintainability, noise, fuel economy, and emissions. BRTC was awarded ISO/IEC 17025 accreditation by A2LA in 2011.

The administrative and garage/maintenance facilities of BRTC are on Plank Road in Duncansville, and road testing is conducted at the LTI Test Track in Bellefonte, near the University Park Airport.

=== Test Track ===
The Test Track includes a 1 mi (1.6 km) oval, vehicle handling area, and vehicle durability testing course.

In collaboration with PennDOT and the Pennsylvania Turnpike Commission, conceptual planning for the Pennsylvania Safety Transportation and Research Track (PennSTART) project was completed in 2018, at a site yet to be identified close to Penn State. The new high-speed closed test track is anticipated to be operated by LTI.
