= Ralph Bartelsmeyer =

American administrator

Ralph R. Bartelsmayer

Acting Administrator of the Federal Highway Administration
- In office July 1, 1972 – June 1, 1973
- President: Richard Nixon
- Preceded by: Francis Turner
- Succeeded by: Norbert Tiemann

Personal details
- Education: University of Illinois

Ralph R. Bartelsmeyer (1909–unknown) was an American civil engineer and federal transportation official who served as Director of the Bureau of Public Roads (BPR) and later as Acting Administrator of the Federal Highway Administration (FHWA). A career highway engineer with roots in Illinois, he played a central role in American highway administration during a transformative era of interstate infrastructure development in the late 1960s and early 1970s.

== Early life ==
Bartelsmeyer was born around 1909. He grew up in Illinois and pursued a degree in civil engineering at the University of Illinois, graduating in 1931. His technical training laid the foundation for a career spanning more than four decades in highway engineering at the county, state, and federal levels.

He married the former Marjorie Shirley of Nashville, Illinois, and they had two sons.

== Career ==
=== Early engineering work (1930–1953) ===
Bartelsmeyer began his professional career in the summer of 1930 as a junior highway engineer in the East St. Louis district of the Illinois Division of Highways. From 1932 to 1934, he served as a junior highway engineer in the Peoria district. He then spent twelve years, from 1934 to 1946, as Washington County highway superintendent. Following this, he worked for two years as a field engineer for a Chicago-based cement manufacturing company. In 1948 he returned to public service as St. Clair County superintendent of highways, a position he held until 1953.

=== Chief Highway Engineer of Illinois (1953–1963) ===
On December 15, 1953, Bartelsmeyer was appointed Chief Highway Engineer of the Illinois Division of Highways by Governor William Stratton, succeeding Frank N. Barker. At the time of his appointment, he was 44 years old with 20 years of experience in highway engineering. The position carried a salary of $15,000 per year.

During his tenure as chief engineer, he also served as Chairman of the Highway Research Board (now the Transportation Research Board), a prominent national body advising on highway research and policy. He remained Chief Highway Engineer until 1963.

Bartelsmeyer was also active in professional organizations, serving as president of the Illinois Engineering Council and holding membership in the Illinois Society of Professional Engineers and the American Road Builders Association.

=== Director, Bureau of Public Roads (1969–1970) ===
In 1969, Bartelsmeyer was nominated by the Nixon administration to serve as Director of the Bureau of Public Roads within the Federal Highway Administration, Department of Transportation. His nomination was confirmed by the U.S. Senate Committee on Public Works following a hearing on April 25, 1969.

The Bureau of Public Roads was abolished as a distinct administrative entity in 1967, when its functions were fully absorbed into the Federal Highway Administration.

=== Acting Administrator, Federal Highway Administration (1970–1973/1974) ===
Following the elimination of the Bureau of Public Roads, Bartelsmeyer became Deputy Administrator of the Federal Highway Administration in 1970. Upon the retirement of FHWA Administrator Francis Turner, Bartelsmeyer assumed the role of Acting Administrator.

He served in this capacity from August 10, 1970, to January 25, 1974 — the longest tenure as acting administrator in FHWA history. Throughout this period, he worked to help state highway agencies adapt to sweeping changes in transportation policy, particularly the growing emphasis on environmental review and urban transportation planning that characterized the early 1970s.

He was succeeded as administrator by Norbert T. Tiemann, who took office on June 1, 1973, as Congress was completing work on the Federal-Aid Highway Act of 1973.
