= Herbert S. Fairbank =

American civil engineer (died 1962)

Herbert S. Fairbank, referred to by colleagues as Jack, worked for the U.S. Bureau of Public Roads under Thomas Harris MacDonald and contributed to major reports on highway infrastructure in the U.S. He served as chairman of the Highway Transport Committee of the American Association of State Highway Officials from 1943 to 1948, was chairman of the Department of Economics, Finance and Administration of the Highway Research Board of the National Academy of Sciences, and was a member of the National Committee on Uniform Traffic Laws and Ordinances. He was a United States delegate to the International Road Congress in Munich in 1934 and was vice-chairman of the U.S. Delegation to the United Nations Convention on Road and Motor Transport in Geneva in 1949. He received the George S. Bartlett Award in 1947, the highest honor "in the highway field" awarded by the American Association of State Highway Officials, the Highway Research Board, and the American Road Builders Association. He received the United States Department of Commerce Exceptional Service Award in 1950 and in 1953 he was awarded the Roy W. Crum Award by the Highway Research Board for outstanding achievement in highway research. In 1957 he was the first recipient of the Thomas H. MacDonald Award for outstanding contributions to highway progress.

On May 5, 1983, Secretary of Transportation Elizabeth Dole and Federal Highway Administrator Ray Barnhart were part of a ceremony dedicating the Francis C. Turner Building. The research center was renamed the Turner-Fairbank Highway Research Center.
