= Nicole Nason =

American government official (born 1970)

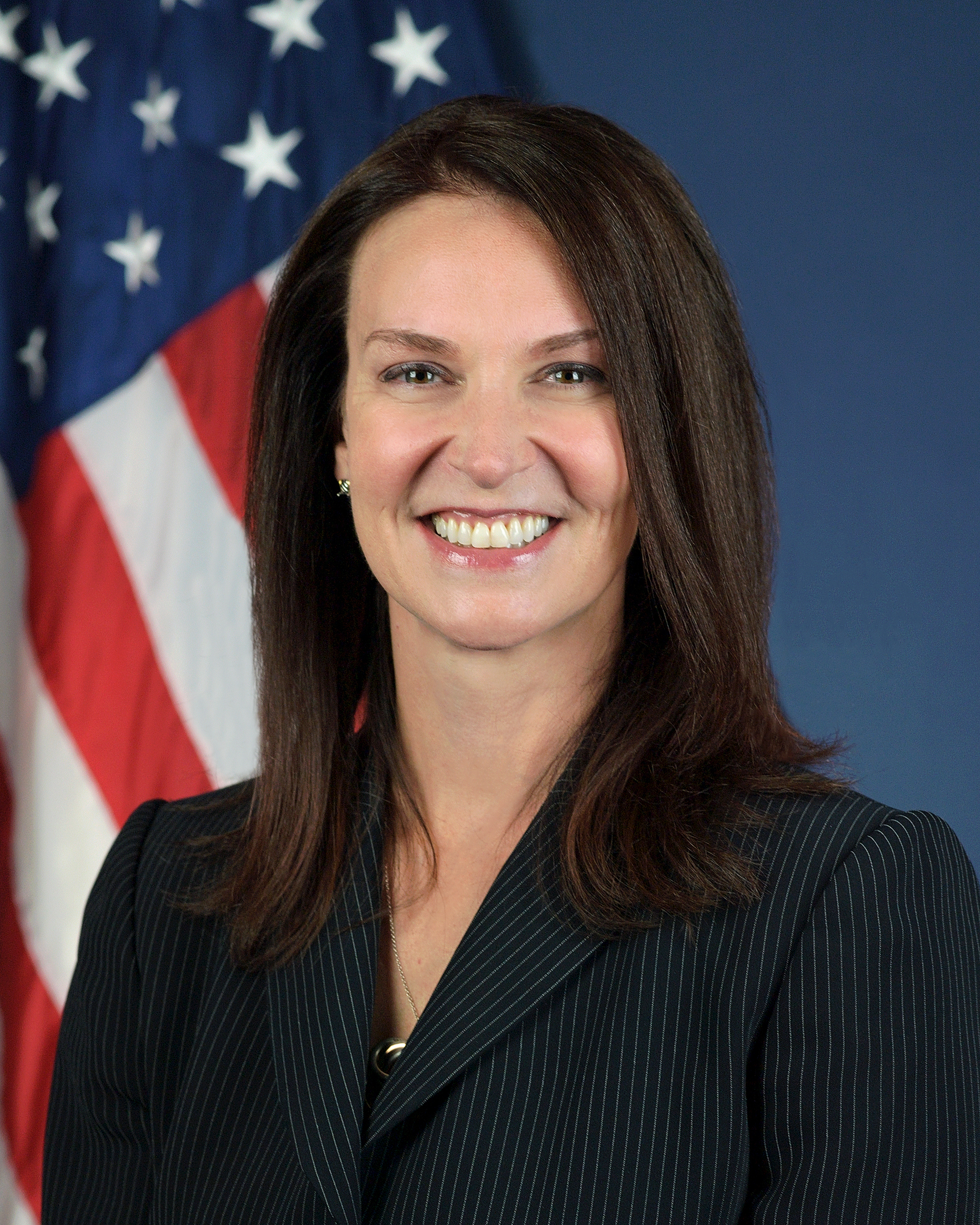

26th Administrator of the Federal Highway Administration
- In office May 7, 2019 – January 20, 2021
- President: Donald Trump
- Deputy: Brandye Hendrickson
- Preceded by: Gregory G. Nadeau
- Succeeded by: Shailen Bhatt (2023)

Assistant Secretary of State for Administration
- In office December 8, 2017 – March 11, 2019
- President: Donald Trump
- Preceded by: Joyce Anne Barr
- Succeeded by: Carrie Cabelka

Administrator of the National Highway Traffic Safety Administration
- In office January 2006 – August 2008
- President: George W. Bush

Personal details
- Born: Nicole Robilotto; August 12, 1970 (age 56) Bay Shore, New York, U.S.
- Party: Republican
- Spouse: David Nason
- Children: 3
- Education: American University (BA); Case Western Reserve University (JD)

Nicole Robilotto Nason (born August 12, 1970) is an American government official who served as the 26th Administrator of the Federal Highway Administration from 2019 to 2021. Nason previously served as the Assistant Secretary of State for Administration. She serves as a vice president of The Boeing Company.

== Early life and education ==
Nason was born in Suffolk County, New York. Her father was a motorcycle traffic cop and police chief. She earned an undergraduate degree in political science from American University in 1992, and a Juris Doctor degree from Case Western University in 1995.

Nason is married to David Nason, Chief Executive Officer of TIAA Wealth Management & Advice Solutions. They reside in Virginia and have three children.

== Career ==
Nason's career in government began when she worked for U.S. Representative Porter Goss, Chairman Henry Hyde, and as Assistant Commissioner for Congressional Affairs for the United States Custom Service.

=== U.S. Department of Transportation ===
Nason began working at the United States Department of Transportation in March 2003 when she was appointed as Assistant Secretary for Governmental Affairs.

==== National Highway Traffic Safety Administration ====
In early 2005, Nason was nominated by President George W. Bush to be the administrator of the National Highway Traffic Safety Administration, the youngest administrator of the office's history. Mothers Against Drunk Driving and the National Safety Council supported her nomination for this role and she was confirmed unanimously. She remained in that post until August 2008.

During her time at NHTSA, Nason managed an international tire recall, as well as a problematic Consumer Reports car-seat safety investigation. She also issued campaigns for stronger penalties against drunk drivers, and new federal vehicle safety testing standards. She worked to expand the NHTSA's authority over CAFE for passenger cars based on size.

According to former EPA staff, she impeded their efforts to regulate greenhouse gas emissions from motor vehicles by failing to coordinate with them. She also ordered NHTSA employees not to communicate with the press, diverging from previous policy.

==== Federal Highway Administration (FHWA) ====
On January 4, 2019, President Trump nominated Nason to serve as administrator of the Federal Highway Administration. On March 28, 2019, she was confirmed by the Senate by a vote of 95–1 and was sworn in on May 7, 2019.

In 2020, Nason oversaw efforts by FHA, US Department of Transportation, and National Highway Traffic Safety Administration to establish the Pedestrian Safety Action Plan for reducing pedestrian fatalities on roads across the U.S. She also worked with Operation Lifesaver to award road-safety grants in 14 states, and the Federal Railway Administration to require 40 states to create and implement highway-rail grade crossing safety measures.

Also in 2020, during the COVID-19 pandemic and the closure of eateries, Nason opted not to fine or punish states that allowed food trucks to operate in rest areas of federally funded Interstate roads.

Nason left office on January 20, 2021, when Joe Biden was sworn in as president.

=== U.S. Department of State ===
Nason was appointed a senior advisor to Secretary of State Rex Tillerson in June 2017. In 2019, she was appointed assistant secretary of state for administration by President Trump.

=== Boeing ===
In April 2022, Nason joined The Boeing Company as the Vice President of Federal Affairs for Aerospace Safety, Commercial Aviation, Sustainability, and Corporate Policy.

== Project Koe ==
Nason practices martial arts, and in 2014 she founded "Project Koe", an organization that empowers women through Shorin-Ryu. Her 2016 TEDx Talk was about its creation.
