= Lowell K. Bridwell =

American politician

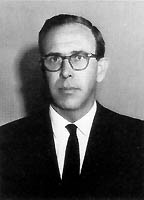
- Bridwell circa 1967-1969

Administrator of the Federal Highway Administration
- In office March 23, 1967 – January 20, 1969
- President: Lyndon B. Johnson
- Preceded by: Rex Marion Whitton
- Succeeded by: Francis Cutler Turner

Personal details
- Born: June 14, 1924 Westerville, Ohio
- Died: November 21, 1986 (aged 62) Columbia, Maryland
- Spouse: Margaret Weidorn Bridwell
- Children: 2
- Education: Ohio State University

Lowell K. Bridwell (14 June 1924 – 21 November 1986) was an American journalist. He was a correspondent for the Associated Press and the Ohio State Journal from 1946 to 1950. He was director of the Federal Highway Administration from 1967 to 1969.

== Biography ==
He was born on June 14, 1924, in Westerville, Ohio. His father worked for the Anti-Saloon League. After World War II, he briefly attended Ohio State University in the late 1940s and early 1950s, married Margaret Bridwell, a physician.

He was a Scripps-Howard reporter in Columbus, Ohio, then Cincinnati, Ohio. During his time as a reporter in the 1950s he wrote many stories about first local and then national interest, and drew the interest of J. Edgar Hoover during the second red scare. His brother Charles Bridwell also worked for the Federal Bureau of Investigation (FBI) at the time in the Columbus field office and refused to spy on his brother for Hoover, thus ending his career in the FBI. Years later, Lowell became well known as the reporter who wrote an exposé debunking Walter Williams, who claimed to be the last surviving Civil War veteran.

After covering John F. Kennedy's run for the presidency in 1960 as a reporter, he joined the administration United States Department of Commerce in April 1962 as assistant to Under Secretary for Transportation Clarence Martin Jr., (under President Kennedy) before being appointed Acting Deputy Federal Highway Administrator on January 20, 1964, under President Johnson a post he held until becoming Deputy Under Secretary of Commerce for Transportation (Operations) on July 2, 1964.

He worked at the Federal Highway Administration from March 23, 1967, until the end of the Johnson administration on January 20, 1969. During this time billions of dollars of highway funds were used to build America's highways from coast to coast.

From 1972 to 1981, Bridwell was the executive director of the Westside Highway Project. Between 1981 and 1984, he was appointed Secretary of the Maryland Department of Transportation, and taught at the Univ. of Maryland during the 1980s.

He died on November 21, 1986, in Columbia, Maryland.
