= Francis Victor du Pont =

American civil engineer and Federal Highway Administration commissioner

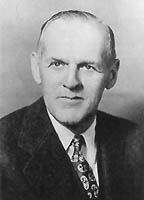

Administrator of the Federal Highway Administration
- In office April 1, 1953 – January 14, 1955
- President: Dwight D. Eisenhower
- Preceded by: Thomas Harris MacDonald
- Succeeded by: Charles Dwight Curtiss

Personal details
- Born: May 28, 1894 Johnstown, Pennsylvania
- Died: May 16, 1962 (aged 67)
- Parent: T. Coleman du Pont
- Education: Massachusetts Institute of Technology
- Occupation: Civil engineer, highway administrator

Francis Victor du Pont (May 28, 1894 – May 16, 1962) was an American civil engineer, transportation commissioner, and member of the Du Pont family. He was involved in the development of public roads and highways in the United States.

== Life and career ==
The son of U.S. Senator and DuPont Company president T. Coleman du Pont and Alice du Pont, Francis Victor graduated from the Massachusetts Institute of Technology and worked as a flight instructor at the US School of Military Aeronautics in Boston and as a research engineer at the DuPont Company's Deepwater Point plant and at a Cadillac plant in Detroit. He also served as president of the Equitable Trust Company of Wilmington and the Equitable Office Building in New York City.

He served on the Delaware State Highway Commission from 1922 to 1949. He also chaired the commission. In this office, Du Pont played a major role in the development of the financing, engineering, and initial phases of the construction of the Delaware Memorial Bridge, the fifth longest suspension span in the world, which was opened to traffic on July 1, 1951.

In 1953, President Dwight D. Eisenhower appointed du Pont to serve as commissioner of the US Bureau of Public Roads (now the Federal Highway Administration). While serving as Commissioner, du Pont recommended a highway program that led to legislation under which the Interstate Highway System was built. He resigned his federal post effective January 14, 1956.

On May 16, 1962, du Pont died from lung cancer.
