= Fatality Analysis Reporting System =

US system to report fatal traffic crashes

Fatality Analysis Reporting System (FARS) was created in the United States by the National Highway Traffic Safety Administration (NHTSA) to provide an overall measure of highway safety, to help suggest solutions, and to help provide an objective basis to evaluate the effectiveness of motor vehicle safety standards and highway safety programs.

FARS contains data on a census of fatal traffic crashes within the 50 states, the District of Columbia, and Puerto Rico. To be included in FARS, a crash must involve a motor vehicle traveling on a trafficway customarily open to the public and result in the death of a person (occupant of a vehicle or a non-occupant) within 30 days of the crash. FARS has been operational since 1975 and has collected information on over 989,451 motor vehicle fatalities and collects information on over 100 different coded data elements that characterizes the crash, the vehicle, and the people involved.

FARS is vital to the mission of NHTSA to reduce the number of motor vehicle crashes and deaths on our nation's highways, and subsequently, reduce the associated economic loss to society resulting from those motor vehicle crashes and fatalities. FARS data is critical to understanding the characteristics of the environment, trafficway, vehicles, and persons involved in the crash.

NHTSA has a cooperative agreement with an agency in each state government to provide information in a standard format on fatal crashes in the state. Data is collected, coded and submitted into a micro-computer data system and transmitted to Washington, D.C. Quarterly files are produced for analytical purposes to study trends and evaluate the effectiveness of highway safety programs. This data is tabulated and provided to the public via the FARS Interface at

== How data is collected ==
In its 2010 Report to Congress, NHTSA claimed that it would cost approximately US$1 billion per year to actually count and classify all crashes. US$1 billion was deemed to be too expensive so instead of that, "... NHTSA devised a method that "utilizes an efficient combination of census, sample-based, and existing state files to provide nationally representative traffic crash data..." and it's been doing that since 1975. NHTSA claims it only costs US$30 million per year and is just as good.

== Data completeness ==
According to NHTSA, an estimated 16 million crashes occur annually and of that total, only 6.2 million of those crashes are ever reported to the police. FARS data is collected on a purely voluntary basis through cooperative agreements between NHTSA and each of the 50 states, the District of Columbia, and Puerto Rico.

== See also ==
- Road traffic safety
