= Martin Dodge =

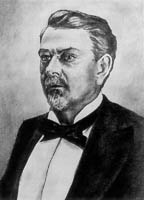

Director of Office of Road Inquiry
- In office January 31, 1899 – 1905
- Preceded by: Roy Stone
- Succeeded by: Logan Waller Page

Personal details
- Born: May 27, 1851 Auburn, Geauga County, Ohio
- Died: April 23, 1931 (aged 79) Washington, DC

Martin Dodge (May 27, 1851 – April 23, 1931) was an American administrator. Dodge was appointed Interim Director of the Office of Road Inquiry in August 1898 when his predecessor, General Roy Stone, vacated the office to serve in the Spanish–American War. General Stone resumed his duties as Director on January 31, 1899. He resigned on October 23, 1899, and Dodge was reappointed and served until 1905.

Dodge was a zealous road builder and an advocate of free roads in the United States. As a member of the Ohio State Roads Commission, he was the leading exponent of the first brick surface rural road in the US. The road was laid on the Wooster Pike near Cleveland. Four miles of brick pavement were built in the fall of 1893 at a cost of $16,000 per mile.

During Dodge's tenure, he recommended and implemented an information office to furnish advice about road-building techniques to State and local officials; established a post-graduate school for civil engineer graduates to receive advanced road-building training; and created the Bureau of Chemistry to study, evaluate, and test road-construction materials.
