= Federal Highway Administration =

US highway transportation agency

Agency overview
- Formed: April 1, 1967; 59 years ago
- Preceding agency: Bureau of Public Roads
- Jurisdiction: Federal government of the United States
- Headquarters: Washington, D.C.
- Annual budget: $46 billion (FY2019)
- Agency executives: Sean McMaster, Administrator; Jay Payne, Deputy Administrator; Executive Director
- Parent agency: United States Department of Transportation
- Website: highways.dot.gov

The Federal Highway Administration (FHWA) is a division of the United States Department of Transportation that specializes in highway transportation. The agency's major activities are grouped into two programs, the Federal-aid Highway Program and the Federal Lands Highway Program. Its role had previously been performed by the Office of Road Inquiry, Office of Public Roads and the Bureau of Public Roads.

== History ==
=== Background ===
With the coming of the bicycle in the 1890s, interest grew regarding the improvement of streets and roads in America. The traditional method of putting the burden of maintaining roads on local landowners was increasingly inadequate. In 1893, the federal Office of Road Inquiry (ORI) was founded; in 1905, it was renamed the Office of Public Roads (OPR) and made a division of the United States Department of Agriculture.

Demands grew for local and state government to take charge. With the coming of the automobile, urgent efforts were made to upgrade and modernize dirt roads designed for horse-drawn wagon traffic. In 1910, the American Association for Highway Improvement was organized. Funding came from automobile registration, and taxes on motor fuels, as well as state aid. By 1914, there were 2.4 million miles of rural dirt rural roads; 100,000 miles had been improved with grading and gravel, and 3,000 miles were given high-quality surfacing. The rapidly increasing speed of automobiles, and especially trucks, made maintenance and repair high-priority items.

In 1915, OPR's name was changed to the Bureau of Public Roads. The following year, federal aid was first made available to improve post roads and promote general commerce: $75 million over five years, issued through the BPR in cooperation with the state highway departments.

In 1939, BPR was renamed to the Public Roads Administration (PRA) and shifted to the Federal Works Agency. After the FWA was abolished in 1949, the organization was once again named the Bureau of Public Roads; it was placed under the Department of Commerce.

From 1917 through 1941, 261,000 miles of highways were built with $3.17 billion in federal aid and $2.14 billion in state and local funds. (Note: The total GNP at current prices, 1917 through 1941 = $2,227.2 billion, so these roads = 5.32/2.227.2 = 1/4 of 1% of GNP.)

=== Creation ===
The Federal Highway Administration was created on October 15, 1966, along with the Bureau of Motor Carrier Safety and the National Highway Safety Bureau (now known as National Highway Traffic Safety Administration), as part of the new U.S. Department of Transportation. The FHWA took over the functions of the Bureau of Public Roads the following year.

== Functions ==
The FHWA's role in the Federal-aid Highway Program is to oversee federal funds to build and maintain the National Highway System (primarily Interstate highways, U.S. highways and most state highways). This funding mostly comes from the federal gasoline tax and mostly goes to state departments of transportation. The FHWA oversees projects using these funds to ensure that federal requirements for project eligibility, contract administration and construction standards are adhered to.

Under the Federal Lands Highway Program (sometimes called "direct fed"), the FHWA provides highway design and construction services for various federal land-management agencies, such as the Forest Service and the National Park Service. The FLHP also jointly administers the Indian Reservation Roads Program.

In addition to these programs, the FHWA performs and sponsors research in the areas of roadway safety, congestion, highway materials and construction methods, and provides funding to local technical assistance program centers to disseminate research results to local highway agencies.

The FHWA also publishes the Manual on Uniform Traffic Control Devices (MUTCD), which is used by most highway agencies in the United States. The MUTCD provides such standards as the size, color and height of traffic signs, traffic signals and road surface markings.

== Programs ==
=== Long-Term Pavement Performance Program ===
Long-Term Pavement Performance (LTPP) is a program supported by the FHWA to collect and analyse road data. The LTPP program was initiated by the Transportation Research Board (TRB) of the National Research Council (NRC) in the early 1980s. The FHWA, with the cooperation of the American Association of State Highway and Transportation Officials (AASHTO), sponsored the program. As a result of this program, the FHWA has collected a huge database of road performance. The FHWA and the ASCE hold an annual contest known as the LTPP International Data Analysis Contest, which challenges researchers to answer a questions based on the LTPP data.

=== Every Day Counts initiative ===
In 2010, FHWA launched the Every Day Counts (EDC) initiative to identify and deploy innovations to reduce project delivery time, enhance safety, and protect the environment. EDC is a state-based model that rapidly deploys proven, yet underutilized innovations. FHWA works with State transportation departments, local governments, tribes, private industry, and other stakeholders to identify a new collection of innovations to champion every two years that merit accelerated deployment. Among the approaches promoted by the EDC effort are: adaptive traffic control to reduce fuel consumption and improve travel time reliability; alternative intersection design; prefabricated bridge elements and systems; high-friction surface treatments; warm mix asphalt; ultra-high-performance concrete; virtual public involvement; and time-saving strategies such as rapid bridge replacement. Since the inception of EDC, each state has used 26 or more of the 57 innovations and some states have deployed more than 45. Many of these practices have become mainstream practices across the country.

=== National Electric Vehicle Infrastructure Formula Program ===
The Infrastructure Investment and Jobs Act of 2021 established the National Electric Vehicle Infrastructure (NEVI) Formula Program, allocating $5 billion over fiscal years 2022 through 2026 for electric vehicle charging infrastructure. The Federal Highway Administration (FHWA) administers the program and provides funding to states for eligible charging projects. The projects were initially focused on installing charging stations along designated Alternative Fuel Corridors.

The program experienced a slow rollout. By January 2026, states had requested reimbursement for approximately $94 million of the $4.4 billion made available to them under NEVI, and states had also obligated approximately $1.4 billion in funding.

== Organization ==
The Federal Highway Administration is overseen by an administrator appointed by the president of the United States by and with the consent of the United States Senate. The administrator works under the direction of the secretary of transportation and deputy secretary of transportation. The internal organization of the FHWA is as follows:

  - Office of Administration
  - Office of Chief Counsel
  - Office of the Chief Financial Officer
  - Office of Civil Rights
  - Office of Federal Lands Highway
  - Office of Infrastructure
  - Office of Innovation and Workforce Solutions
  - Office of Operations
  - Office of Planning, Environment, and Realty
  - Office of Policy and Government Affairs
  - Office of Public Affairs
  - Office of Research, Development, and Technology
  - Office of Safety

=== Administrators ===
The following persons served as the administrator of the Federal Highway Administration or one of its predecessors:

No.	Portrait	Administrator	Term started	Term ended	Notes
1		Roy Stone	October 3, 1893	October 13, 1899	Special agent and engineer for the Office of Road Inquiry
2		Martin Dodge	January 31, 1899	1905	Director of the Office of Public Road Inquiries
3		Logan Waller Page	1905	December 9, 1918	
4		Thomas Harris MacDonald	April 1, 1919	June 30, 1939	Chief of the Bureau of Public Roads
4		Thomas Harris MacDonald	July 1, 1939	August 19, 1949	Administrator of the Public Roads Administration
4		Thomas Harris MacDonald	August 20, 1949	March 31, 1953	Commissioner of the Bureau of Public Roads
5		Francis Victor du Pont	April 1, 1953	January 14, 1955	
6		Charles Dwight Curtiss	January 14, 1955	October 1956	
7		John A. Volpe	October 22, 1956	February 5, 1957	
8		Bertram D. Tallamy	February 5, 1957	January 20, 1961	
9		Rex Marion Whitton	January 20, 1961	December 30, 1966	
10		Lowell K. Bridwell	March 23, 1967	March 31, 1967	Commissioner of the Bureau of Public Roads
10		Lowell K. Bridwell	April 1, 1967	January 20, 1969	Administrator of the Federal Highway Administration
11		Francis Turner	March 13, 1969	June 30, 1972	
acting		Ralph Bartelsmeyer	July 1, 1972	June 1, 1973	
12		Norbert Tiemann	June 1, 1973	March 31, 1977	
13		William M. Cox	April 7, 1977	May 1, 1978	
14		Karl S. Bowers	April 3, 1978	January 1980	
15		John S. Hassell Jr.	July 11, 1980	February 5, 1981	
16		Ray Barnhart	February 12, 1981	December 31, 1987	
17		Robert E. Farris	June 8, 1988	May 17, 1989	
18		Thomas D. Larson	August 10, 1989	January 20, 1993	
19		Rodney E. Slater	June 3, 1993	February 14, 1997	
20		Kenneth R. Wykle	December 2, 1997	September 4, 2001	
21		Mary E. Peters	October 2, 2001	July 29, 2005	
22		J. Richard Capka	May 31, 2006	January 24, 2008	
23		Thomas J. Madison Jr.	August 18, 2008	January 20, 2009	
24		Victor Mendez	January 20, 2009	July 24, 2014	
25		Gregory G. Nadeau	July 30, 2014	January 20, 2017	
acting		Brandye Hendrickson	July 24, 2017	May 6, 2019	
26		Nicole Nason	May 7, 2019	January 20, 2021	
acting		Stephanie Pollack	February 24, 2021	January 13, 2023	
27		Shailen Bhatt	January 13, 2023	September 10, 2024	
acting		Kristin White	September 11, 2024	December 16, 2024	
acting		Gloria M. Shepherd	December 17, 2024	September 23, 2025	
28		Sean McMaster	September 23, 2025	Present	

=== Deputy administrators ===
- D. Grant Mickle October 27, 1961 – January 20, 1964
- Lowell K. Bridwell (acting) January 20, 1964 – March 23, 1967
- Ralph Bartelsmeyer August 10, 1970 – January 25, 1974
- Joseph R. Coupal Jr September 30, 1974 – 1977
- Karl S. Bowers June 5, 1977 – August 3, 1978
- John S. Hassell, Jr. August 31, 1978 – July 11, 1980
- Alinda Burke August 8, 1980 – ?
- Lester P. Lamm September 17, 1982 – 1986
- Robert E. Farris August 8, 1986 - June 8, 1988
- Eugene R. McCormick June 30, 1989 - ?
- Gloria J. Jeff December 19, 1997 – January 3, 1999
- Walter Sutton Jr (acting) January 3, 1999 – May 3, 2000 May 3, 2000 – January 2001
- J. Richard Capka August 5, 2002 – May 31, 2006
- Kerry O'Hare November 10, 2008 – January 20, 2009
- Gregory G. Nadeau July 8, 2009 – July 30, 2014
- Brandye Hendrickson July 24, 2017 – July 19, 2019
- Mala Parker October 10, 2019 – January 20, 2021
- Stephanie Pollack January 27, 2021 – February 1, 2023
- Andrew Rogers February 27, 2023 – January 2024
- Kristin White May 20, 2024 – December 16, 2024
- Gloria Shepherd (acting) December 17, 2024 – October 22, 2025
- Jay Payne November 12, 2025 – Present

=== Executive directors ===
- Lester P. Lamm, August 8, 1973 – ?
- Thomas D. Everett, October 22, 2018 – June 30, 2022
- Mayela Sosa (Acting), June 30, 2022 - October 20, 2022
- Gloria M. Shepherd, October 20, 2022 - October 22, 2025

== See also ==
- Federal Motor Carrier Safety Administration
- Highway Gothic
- Intelligent Transportation Systems Institute
- Intelligent Transportation Systems
- National Transportation Communications for Intelligent Transportation System Protocol (NTCIP)
- Title 23 of the Code of Federal Regulations
- U.S. Department of Transportation
