= 149th Pennsylvania Infantry Regiment =

Union Army infantry regiment

149th Pennsylvania Infantry
- Pennsylvania flag
- Active: August 30, 1862 – June 24, 1865
- Disbanded: June 24, 1865
- Country: United States
- Allegiance: Union
- Branch: Infantry
- Equipment: 1853 Enfield Rifle Musket
- Engagements: American Civil War: Battle of Chancellorsville; Battle of Gettysburg; Battle of the Wilderness; Battle of Spotsylvania Court House; Battle of North Anna; Battle of Totopotomoy Creek; Battle of Cold Harbor; Second Battle of Petersburg; Battle of Globe Tavern; Battle of Hatcher's Run

Commanders
- Notable commanders: Colonel Roy Stone; Lt Col Walton Dwight; Col John Irvin

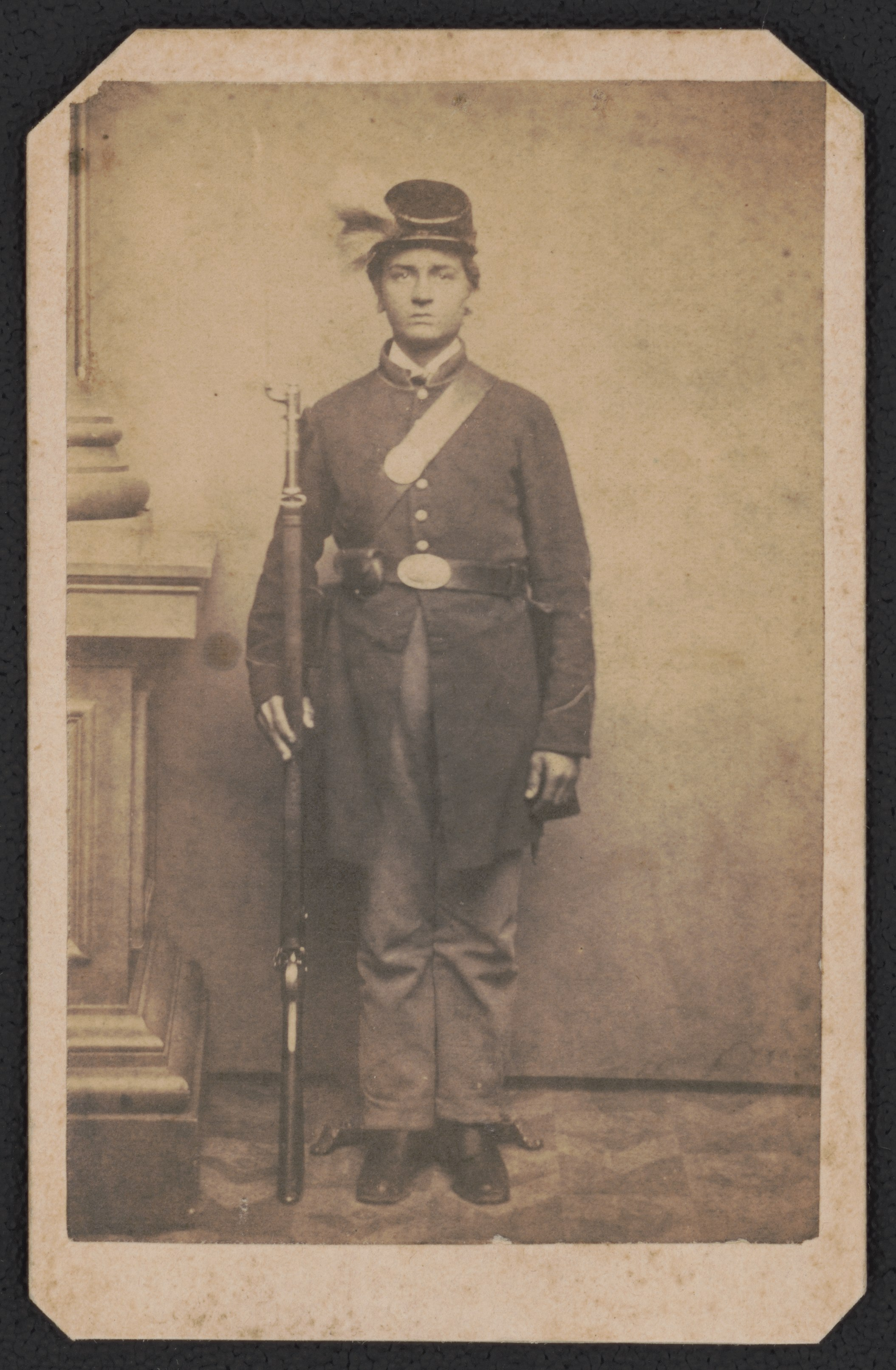
Private Franklin W. Lehman of Co. C, 149th Pennsylvania Infantry Regiment ("Bucktails"). From the Liljenquist Family Collection of Civil War Photographs, Prints and Photographs Division, Library of Congress

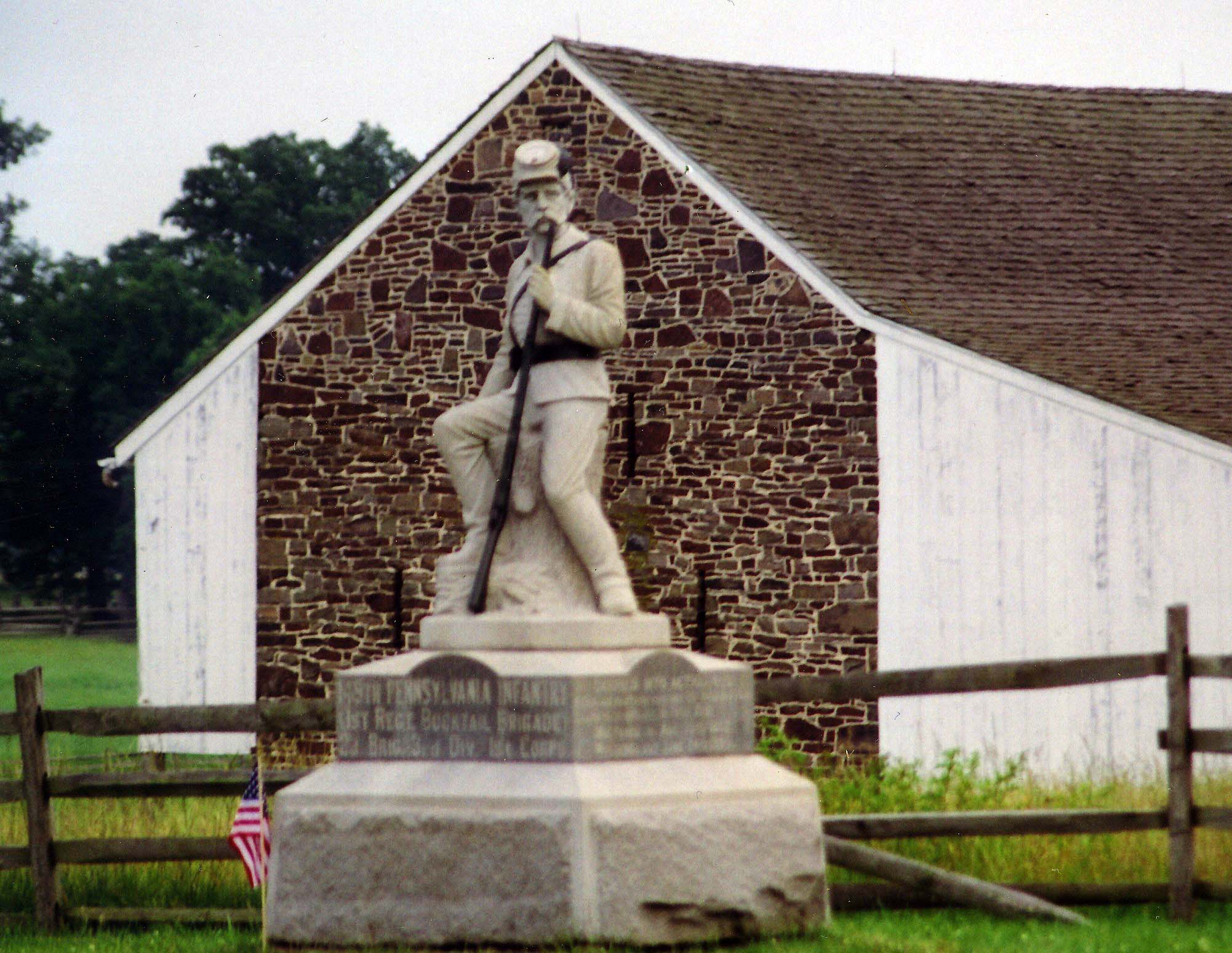
Monument along Chambersburg Pike at Gettysburg

The 149th Pennsylvania Infantry, also known as the 2nd Bucktail Regiment, volunteered during the American Civil War and served a 3-year term from August 1862 to June 1865. Like their forerunners in the 1st Bucktail Regiment, each soldier wore a bucktail on his headwear as a trophy of marksmanship.
During the first year of the Civil War, the 1st Bucktails distinguished themselves as skirmishers and sharpshooters, and Secretary of War Edwin M. Stanton desired to raise an entire brigade of similar characteristics. Stanton enlisted Major Roy Stone of the 1st Bucktails to this task, and Stone raised 20 companies of recruits by the end of August 1862. These 20 companies became the 149th and 150th Pennsylvania Infantry Regiments.
The Regiment is most noted for its service and sacrifice on July 1, 1863, at the Battle of Gettysburg. One source reports 53 soldiers killed, 172 wounded, and 111 missing or captured out of 450 soldiers engaged for a total casualty rate of 74.7% at the epic Battle.

== Organization ==
Company	Primary Location of Recruitment	Earliest Captain
A	Lycoming & Tioga Counties	Alfred J. Sofield
B	Clearfield County	John Irvin
C	Lebanon County	John H. Bassler
D	Allegheny County	James Glenn
E	Clearfield County	Z.C. McCullough
F	Luzerne County	Edwin S. Osborne
G	Perry, Potter & Tioga Counties	Thomas B. Bryden
H	Clarion & Mifflin Counties	Charles B. Stratton
I	Huntingdon County	Brice X. Blair
K	Potter County	John C. Johnson

== Gettysburg ==
=== Prelude ===
After a long march, the I Corps was in the vicinity of Gettysburg on July 1. Fighting would begin that day before the Union infantry, including the Bucktails, were in position. By 9:30 am, the Bucktails were coming up fast from their overnight quarters at the Samuel White farm. Daugherty summarized research on the route:

Evidence suggests that the brigade moved from the Samuel White farm, where they had spent the night, to the Bull Frog Road, and then east on the Millerstown Road (now Pumping Station Road), crossed Sachs covered bridge, and arrived at the Millerstown Road intersection with the Emmitsburg Road at the Peach Orchard.(59)

As they neared Gettysburg, they were given instructions to leave the road and march, double-quick, 2 miles across fields to the Lutheran Theological Seminary.(60) Stone's brigade arrived in the seminary area soaked in sweat and panting with exhaustion. Many men had fallen out of the ranks but soon rejoined the brigade.(61)

General Reynolds had been killed that morning, struck at about 10:15 while directing movements on McPherson's Ridge. General Doubleday was, therefore, in command of the I Corps, when he came upon the men near the seminary. Chamberlin recalled Doubleday's comments after he learned they were from Pennsylvania:

[He] addressed a few words of encouragement to the several regiments, reminding them that they were upon their own soil, that the eye of the commonwealth was upon them, and that there was every reason to believe they would do their duty to the uttermost in defense of their State.(62)

Doubleday ordered Stone to deploy his three regiments south of Chambersburg Pike, along McPherson Ridge between two other I Corps brigades, those of Brigadier General Solomon Meredith and Brigadier General Lysander Cutler. As Doubleday turned to leave, he told them, "Hold them boys when you get there." One of the men shouted back, "If we can't hold them, where can you get men that can?"(63) Then, shouting "We have come to stay," the line of Pennsylvanians went forward.(64)

The ridge was on a farm owned by Edward McPherson, whose political career had taken him to Washington as a two-term Congressman. He had lost his reelection bid in 1862 and was. At the time of the battle, in Washington serving as Chief Clerk of the House of Representatives.(65) The primary goal at McPherson Ridge was delay—to give the Union forces time to reach Gettysburg for the battle—and to inflict as many casualties as possible. The location assigned Stone made their delaying mission even more difficult than it would have been under any circumstance. Historian Hartwig D. Scott explained the difficulties:

The McPherson's Ridge position was also fraught with difficulties in successfully defending it. As long as the Confederates approached from the west, it was a strong position, although there was no strong terrain feature for the left flank to rest upon. However, the position was dreadfully exposed to Oak Hill, one mile north of the Chambersburg Pike, from which the Confederates could enfilade Doubleday's entire line [sweeping fire from a line of troops] and make it untenable.(66)

=== Engagement ===
Amidst bursting shells fired by Confederate artillerymen on Herr Ridge, Stone's brigade took its position between McPherson's house and the Chambersburg Road. Sending out skirmishers to cover the brigade's front, Stone ordered the remaining men to lie down behind the reverse slope of McPherson's Ridge and endure the pounding.(67) It was about 11:00 a.m.. Stone's official report of the battle set the scene:

As we came upon the field, the enemy opened fire upon us from two batteries on the opposite ridge, and continued it with some intermissions, during the action. Our low ridge afforded slight shelter from this fire, but no better was attainable, and our first disposition was unchanged until between 12 and 1 o'clock.(68)

At about 1 p.m., a Confederate battery under Major General Robert E. Rodes on Oak Hill, to the brigade's extreme right, opened fire on Cutler's and Stone's brigades. With permission, Cutler's brigade pulled back to prevent a possible attack from the northwest, leaving Stone's brigade exposed. Hartwig explained the importance of Stone's men at this point to the gradually emerging battle:

"I relied greatly upon Stone's Brigade to hold the post assigned them . . ." reported Doubleday, for after the corps was forced to respond to Rodes' threat, Stone held the angle in the line and Doubleday considered it, "in truth the key-point of the first day's battle."(69)

Stone's own report put the situation as follows:

[A] new battery upon a hill on the extreme right opened a most destructive enfilade of our line, and at the same time all the troops upon my right fell back nearly a half mile to the Seminary Ridge. This made my position hazardous and difficult in the extreme, but rendered its maintenance all the more important.(70)

He moved the troops under his command into a right-angle deployment, with some men still on the ridge but with others facing to the north along Chambersburg Pike. However, the movement attracted Confederate notice. Shelling from Herr's Ridge became intense.

=== Color Episode ===
The situation threatened to grow intolerable. Stone improvised. Colonel [Walton] Dwight [of the 149th] was instructed to detach his color guard to a point north of the Chambersburg Pike, about fifty yards to the left front of the regiment. [Dwight's men] found a small breastwork of rails . . . and hunkered down with only their colors exposed to weather the storm.

The ruse worked [as the Confederates] spied the colors and assumed the 149th had changed their position again and shifted their fire at them, sparing Dwight's main body further punishment.(71)

The color guard was under the direction of Sergeant Henry G. Brehm. His men were Corporals John Friddell, Frederick Hoffman, and Franklin W. Lehman, and Color Guards Henry H. Spayd and John H. Hammel.

The Confederates, part of General A. P. Hill's forces, were massing for an attack on the Union line north of the Chambersburg Pike, as Stone could see from his position. Stone's official report described the attack, which began about 1:30. He had been able to watch their formation for at least 2 miles:

It appeared to be a nearly continuous line of deployed battalions, with other battalions in mass or reserve. Their line being formed not parallel but obliquely to ours, their left first became engaged with the troops on the northern prolongation of Seminary Ridge. The battalions engaged soon took a direction parallel to those opposed to them, thus causing a break in their line and exposing the flank of those engaged to the first of my two regiments in the Chambersburg road.(72)

=== The Railroad Cut ===
The Confederate troops began to scale a fence along a steep railroad cut that had been built some years earlier for an intended extension of the Pennsylvania Railroad parallel to the pike.(73) The 149th opened fire, nearly destroying one North Carolina brigade. Stone stated, "Though at the longest range of our pieces, we poured a most destructive fire upon their flanks, and, together with the fire in their front, scattered them over the fields."

Anticipating a second attack under General Junius Daniel, Stone ordered Colonel Dwight and the 149th to occupy the railroad cut. While Daniel's men directed their fire to the repositioned colors, the 149th held its fire until the North Carolinians had reached the fence 22 paces beyond the cut. Stone explained that, "when they came to a fence within pistol-shot of his line [Dwight] gave them a staggering volley; reloading as they climbed the fence, and waiting till they came within 30 yards, gave them another volley, and charged, driving them back over the fence in utter confusion."(74)

The 143rd had remained in its original position along Chambersburg Pike in support of the 149th. The volleys from the 143rd helped repulse Daniel's men. According to Colonel Dwight, "the enemy's dead and wounded [were] completely covering the ground in our front."(75)

Although many observers and historians considered these actions as heroic, Private Harris of the 143rd viewed them from the perspective of his grudge against Stone and the 149th. Years later, when he recalled watching Dwight's men of the 149th moving toward the railroad cut, he summarized his thoughts at the time:

There go the men of the 149th with their tails just a bobbing. What does that mean? Have they got this job by contract? Stone is after a big chunk of glory for his tails and does not intend that the 143rd shall have any of it.(76)

At about this point, between 1:30 and 2 p.m., as Colonel Wister faced attack from the railroad cut to the west, Colonel Stone was struck in the hip and arm. Chamberlin described the circumstances:

Colonel Stone, who had ably directed the operations of his brigade, exposing himself fearlessly at all times, went forward a short distance to reconnoitre [sic], when he received severe wounds in the hip and arm, which entirely disabled him.(77)

Stone turned over his command to Colonel Wister and was carried off the field to a makeshift hospital in the McPherson barn, where he was placed on straw in a horse stall.

With Stone out of action, his brigade held McPherson's Ridge until nearly 3:30. Soon, the barn was behind the Confederate line and Stone was among the prisoners of war.

=== Annihilation of the Color Guard ===
In the confusion, no one had ordered the 149th color guard to retreat from its successful ruse. Colonel Stone was incapacitated. Colonel Dwight was reportedly drunk.(78) Captain John H. Basler, whose Company C of the 149th, included the color guard, was also injured and out of action. Still, the failure to recall the guard would be one of the points of controversy for historians describing the events of July 1, 1863.

Sergeant Brehm felt duty bound to remain at his post until relieved, but when it became clear the tide of battle was turning, he dispatched Corporal Hoffman to get revised orders. Finding that his comrades had retreated, Hoffman could not find an officer to issue new orders. Seeing that Sergeant Brehm's position was about to be overrun, Hoffman joined the retreat. The Confederates had been hesitant to approach the flags, which implied the presence of a regiment. Finally, a squad from the 42nd Mississippi moved forward cautiously to investigate. With a Rebel yell, they leaped into the hiding place. A frenzied fight over the colors took place, with the color guard desperately trying unsuccessfully to save the colors. In the end, Color Sergeant Brehm was killed trying to keep the colors from falling into enemy hands.

The color episode would be debated for many years, first for its employment and second for the failure to recall the color guard. As to the first, Matthews considered it "an unlikely maneuver, not found in any military textbook of the time." He wondered why only the colors of the 149th, but not the 143rd and the 150th, were moved to deceive the Confederate forces. Was this, he wonders, another example of Stone favoring the 149th he had recruited in 1862? Perhaps, after all, as Stone and Dwight later claimed, the episode was simply intended to deceive the Confederates:

We can therefore decide that while unconventional it was effective, though certainly not in keeping with mid-nineteenth century military tactics where honor on the battlefield dictated a great deal. Whatever the reason, we can be relatively certain that the ruse saved lives during Daniel's second advance on the Railroad Cut.(79)

Years later, Captain Basler attempted to clear up what had happened, particularly in response to the controversy about why the color guard had not been recalled. In addition to pulling together accounts from the survivors of the color guard and others, he contacted General Stone, who replied to his "Dear Comrade" from Washington on September 26, 1896. He explained his plan:

The colors of the 149th were a target for the 34 guns which practically enfiladed the Regiment from the ridge beyond the run and when they had got the range, there was no safety for the regiment from quick destruction, but in confusing and deceiving the enemy [as] to its location. My plan was to fire a volley or two from the edge of the R.R. cut and bring the regiment back under cover of the smoke, leaving the colors to draw the fire of the batteries. But the movement, as it was executed, had greater results than I had hoped. It deceived the enemy in our front also, with the idea that we had force enough to take the offensive, and they delayed their final attack on that account, and "every minute gained then and there was worth a regiment," as Col. Nicholson says.

He indicated that he would have ordered the color guard to return "if I had been spared." He added that the regiment "could not have lived to do the grand work it did later in the action" if he had not dispatched the color guard. Noting that General Doubleday referred to the Bucktails' position as the "key point" in the battle and that the enemy's official reports agreed, General Stone stated:

I have proposed to the [U.S. Battlefield] Commission to establish the "key point" and mark it with a special monument, and shall ask the survivors of the 149th at their next reunion to co-operate in this work of justice to the Brigade.(80)

=== Aftermath ===
Overall, the new Bucktails had been severely weakened. The 149th had lost 336 men (killed, wounded, or missing in action) or 74.7 percent of the 450 men who began the day's battle. Elsewhere within the Bucktail Brigade, the 150th lost 264 out of 397 men (66.5 percent), while the 143rd lost 241 of 465 men (51.8 percent).(81)

As Hartwig explained, these losses, high though they were, had served their purpose:

The stand on McPherson's Ridge had purchased time, but the cost had been staggering. Every regiment, except for three, had lost more than sixty percent of their men. Four had lost over seventy percent . . . . What had such ghastly sacrifice gained? The job of the 1st Corps was to buy time and inflict losses. Doubleday had purchased perhaps one and one-half precious hours by defending McPherson's Ridge. His defenders had also inflicted crippling losses upon their attackers . . . . The Confederates had won a tactical victory on July 1, but the delaying action of the I and XI Corps, and Buford's cavalry, had given the Federal army the strategic advantage, which ultimately proved to be decisive in the outcome of the battle.(82)

Stone, in his official report, gave all the credit to his men:

No language can do justice to the conduct of my officers and men on the bloody "first day" to the coolness with which they watched and awaited, under a fierce storm of shot and shell, the approach of the enemy's overwhelming masses; their ready obedience to orders, and the prompt and perfect execution, under fire, of all the tactics of the battle-field; to the fierceness of their repeated attacks, or to the desperate tenacity of their resistance. They fought as if each man felt that upon his own arm hung the fate of the day and the nation.(83)

Doubleday also praised Stone and the Bucktails in his official report:

I relied greatly on Stone's brigade to hold the post assigned them, as I soon saw I would be obliged to change front with a portion of my line to face the northwest, and his brigade held the pivot of the movement. My confidence in this noble body of men was not misplaced . . . . They repulsed the repeated attacks of vastly superior numbers at close quarters, and maintained their position until the final retreat of the whole line. Stone himself was shot down, battling to the last.(84)

The Battle of Gettysburg ended on July 3, the Union forces under General George G. Meade having defeated General Lee. The weakened Union forces allowed Lee to retreat to Virginia.
