= Roy Stone (general) =

United States Army general

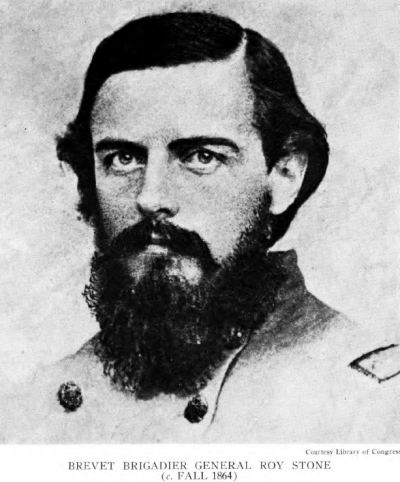
- Roy Stone in the Civil War

Division of Public Roads
- In office October 3, 1893 – October 13, 1899
- Preceded by: Position Established
- Succeeded by: Martin Dodge

Personal details
- Born: October 16, 1836 Plattsburgh, New York, US
- Died: August 5, 1905 (aged 68) Mendham, New Jersey, US

Military service
- Allegiance: United States of America; Union
- Branch/service: United States Army; Union Army
- Years of service: 1861–1865, 1898
- Rank: Brigadier General
- Commands: 149th Pennsylvania Infantry
- Battles/wars: American Civil War; Spanish–American War: Puerto Rican Campaign

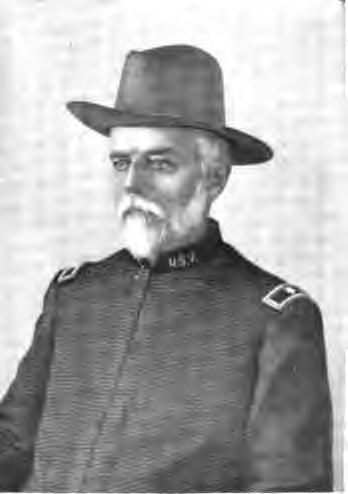
Roy Stone during the Spanish–American War

Roy Stone (October 16, 1836 – August 5, 1905) was an American soldier, civil engineer, and inventor. He served in the American Civil War, distinguishing himself during the Battle of Gettysburg, and took part in the Spanish–American War. He pursued a civil engineering career in a peacetime and became in 1893 the first head of the Office of Road Inquiry, which was the Federal Highway Administration's predecessor.

== Early life and family ==
Stone was born in Plattsburgh, New York, to Ithiel V. and Sarah Stone. His family had been among the early settlers of the region, and his father owned a large estate. As a young man, he was an engineer and lumberman before the Civil War. Stone married Mary Elizabeth Marker at the First Presbyterian Church in Pittsburgh on August 14, 1862. They had two children, a son, Richmond and a daughter, Romaine (Mrs. L. Turnure Jr. and later Lady Monson).

== Civil War ==
Stone served as a Union Army officer during the Civil War and became noted for his stubborn defense of the McPherson Farm during the Battle of Gettysburg.

He first served as major of the 13th Pennsylvania Reserves, a regiment that saw action at several early war battles, including Antietam. Stone returned to Pennsylvania to help recruit new regiments; he was commissioned as colonel of the newly raised 149th Pennsylvania Volunteer Infantry in 1863. He commanded a brigade in the third division of I Corps of the Army of the Potomac in the Battle of Chancellorsville but did not see serious combat. During the Gettysburg campaign, Stone retained command of his three Pennsylvania regiments.

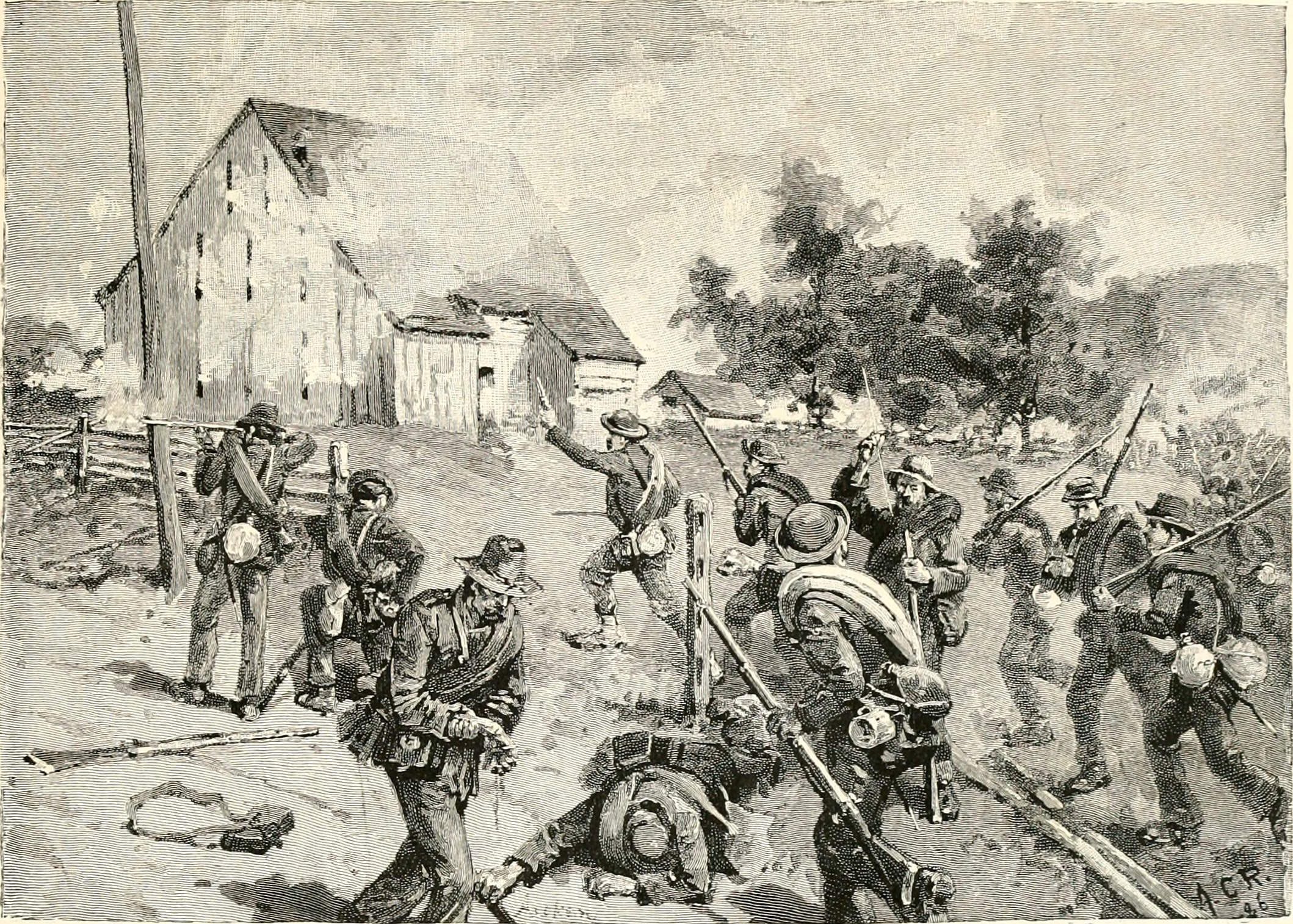
Confederate troops attack the McPherson Farm

On July 1, 1863, on the first day of the Battle of Gettysburg, his brigade, largely composed of green troops, was posted on McPherson's Ridge south of the Chambersburg Pike. Although the brigade had not seen previous combat, it was instrumental in holding back several assaults by the Confederates. Stone moved his regiments to block attacks by Colonel John Brockenborough and Brigadier General Junius Daniel. His troops held until the Iron Brigade and other Federal units fell back. Stone's men were among last to withdraw from their sector. Stone was severely wounded in the hip and arm in the fighting, and he returned home to recuperate.

After his return to active duty, Stone served briefly as a brigade commander in James Wadsworth's 4th Division, V Corps during Lt. Gen. Ulysses S. Grant's 1864 Overland Campaign. He was removed from command during the Battle of the Wilderness. Stone's horse fell on him on May 5, but many presumed he had been drunk on the battlefield.

Stone commanded Camp Curtin, Pennsylvania, September 7, 1864–December 15, 1864, and the Alton Military Prison in Alton, Illinois, December 15, 1864–January 27, 1865. He resigned from the volunteers on January 27, 1865.

On December 12, 1864, President Abraham Lincoln nominated Stone for appointment as brevet brigadier general, U.S. Volunteers, to rank from September 7, 1864, for "gallant services during the war, and especially at Gettysburg" and the United States Senate confirmed the appointment on February 20, 1865.

== Postbellum ==
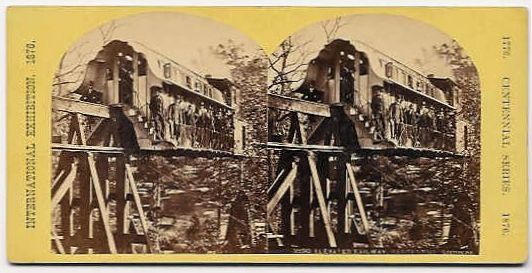
Roy Stone's Centennial Monorail of 1876

Stone became a leading advocate of the Good Roads Movement which is now known. His contributions led to major changes and improvements in highway construction and design. He served as one of the early heads of the Division of Public Roads from October 3, 1883 - October 13, 1899.

Among his inventions was a steam-driven monorail at the Centennial International Exhibition of 1876 in Philadelphia. A larger version was built in 1878 as Bradford and Foster Brook Railway, Pennsylvania.

Stone briefly returned to active military duty with the rank of Brigadier General in 1898, serving in the Puerto Rican Campaign of the Spanish–American War.

== Death ==
Roy Stone died August 5, 1905, at Mendham, New Jersey. He is buried at Arlington National Cemetery.

== Honors ==
Stone Avenue in the Gettysburg National Military Park is named in his honor and memory. The palm genus Roystonea is named in memory of the work he did in road building in Puerto Rico during the capture of the island.

== See also ==
- List of American Civil War brevet generals (Union)
