= John S. Hassell Jr. =

American civil engineer

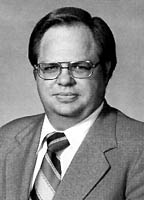

Administrator of the Federal Highway Administration
- In office July 11, 1980 – February 5, 1981
- President: Jimmy Carter; Ronald Reagan
- Preceded by: Karl S. Bowers
- Succeeded by: Ray Barnhart

Personal details
- Born: March 5, 1943 Tallahassee, Florida
- Died: October 11, 2011 (aged 68) Fredericksburg, Virginia
- Spouse: Barbara Hassell
- Children: 1

John S. Hassell Jr. (May 3, 1943 – October 11, 2011) was an American civil engineer. He became Associate Administrator for Planning in 1977, Deputy Federal Highway Administrator in 1978, and Administrator on July 11, 1980. Prior to his federal career, Hassell served the public as an engineer and planner for the Georgia Department of Transportation. He also had a bachelor's and master's degree in civil engineering from the Georgia Institute of Technology.

Under Hassell's tenure, the Federal Highway Administration:

- Resolved controversial highway projects consistent with Administration policy so that major sections of the Interstate System could move toward completion.
- Improved highway safety by emphasizing the importance of safety in all Agency programs.
- Increased energy conservation by greatly enhancing the ridesharing program, developing and implementing measures to encourage use of high occupancy vehicles, and improving traffic operations through expanded use of Transportation System Management measures.
- Achieved significant gains in furthering career opportunities for women and minorities throughout the Agency and substantially increased the accomplishments of the Minority Business Enterprise Program.
- Developed and implemented a management-by-objectives program and implemented the 1979 Civil Services Reform Act to improve the Agency's management and efficiency.

On October 10, 2011, Hassell died at the Mary Washington Hospital in Fredericksburg, Virginia.
