= Francis Turner (engineer) =

American administrator

Francis Cutler Turner
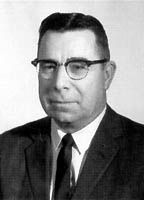

Administrator of the Federal Highway Administration
- In office March 13, 1969 – June 30, 1972
- President: Richard Nixon
- Preceded by: Lowell K. Bridwell
- Succeeded by: Norbert Tiemann

Personal details
- Born: December 28, 1908 Dallas, Texas, U.S.
- Died: October 6, 1999 (aged 90) Goldsboro, North Carolina, U.S.
- Education: Texas A&M University

Francis Cutler Turner (December 28, 1908 – October 6, 1999) was an American administrator, who headed the Federal Highway Administration (FHWA) from March 30, 1969, to June 30, 1972.

== Biography ==
He was born on December 28, 1908, in Dallas, Texas, and spent his childhood in Texas, including in Fort Worth. He received his bachelor's degree in civil engineering from Texas A&M in 1929 and a graduate degree in civil engineering from there in 1940.

Turner's career began in earnest with an assignment to oversee Federal-aid road projects in Arkansas. Afterwards, he was asked to work on the Alaska Highway, where he is credited with implementing the milepost system. Post World War II, he was asked to oversee repairs of the road system in the Philippines.

Turner was appointed by President Eisenhower to be the Executive Secretary of the Clay Commission President's Advisory Committee on the National Highway Program in 1954. He then worked as the deputy commissioner, chief engineer, and Federal Highway Administrator. As the British newspaper The Independent noted in Turner's 1999 obituary, Turner's resume can be read in the landscape: When the young area engineer began his career in Arkansas, "most American roads were dirt and gravel." As of 1999, America offered 42,000 miles of Interstate; these miles had been developed at a cost of $130 billion, much of that capital "personally superintended by Turner."

He died on October 6, 1999, at the age 90, at a hospice in Goldsboro, North Carolina.

== Legacy ==
In 1983, the Fairbank Highway Research Station in McLean, Virginia, named for Herbert S. Fairbank, an official at FHWA's predecessor Bureau of Public Roads, was renamed the Turner-Fairbank Highway Research Center in honor of Turner.
