= Logan Waller Page =

American government official (1870–1918)

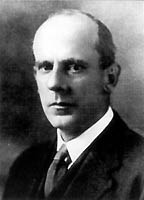

Director of Public Roads
- In office 1905 – December 9, 1918
- Preceded by: Martin Dodge
- Succeeded by: Thomas Harris MacDonald

Personal details
- Born: January 10, 1870 Richmond, Virginia, U.S.
- Died: December 9, 1918 (aged 48) Chicago, Illinois, U.S.
- Spouse: Ann Page Shaler
- Children: 1
- Relatives: Walter Hines Page (cousin)
- Education: Virginia Polytechnic Institute; Harvard University; National School of Bridges and Roads

Logan Waller Page (January 10, 1870 – December 9, 1918) was an American government official. He became the first director of the Office of Public Roads in 1905, after the U.S. Congress passed an act that consolidated the Office of Public Inquiry and the Bureau of Chemistry.

== Early life ==
Logan Waller Page was born on January 10, 1870, in Richmond, Virginia, to Legh R. Page. He studied at the Virginia Polytechnic Institute and later graduated from Harvard University. He also attended the National School of Bridges and Roads in France.

== Career ==
Page worked for the state of Massachusetts as a geologist and testing engineer. He conducted the first extensive investigation of road-building materials in America. In 1900, he became chief of the Division of Tests, a division of the United States Department of Agriculture, in Washington, D.C. In this role, he studied road building on a national scale. Later, as chief of the Bureau of Chemistry, a series of investigations conducted awarded the laboratories he directed international acclaim. On July 1, 1905, he became the first director of the Office of Public Roads. In 1915, it was renamed the Office of Public Roads and Rural Engineering and in 1918, it was renamed the Bureau of Public Roads. Page helped prepare the Federal Aid Road Act of 1916 with the U.S. Congress. He then worked with state highway departments in planning and executing work relating to the law. He also advised state legislatures in their activities to enable federal cooperation. Page was chairman of the United States Highways Council during World War I. At the time of his death, he was director of road work for the Department of Agriculture.

Page invented machines for highway improvement. He wrote a number of publications on road construction. Page conducted "a petrographic study" of road-building materials and wrote the first comprehensive report on the elements of road-building rocks. He improved French rock-testing machines that led to physical testing of road-building rocks to become a routine procedure. He was president of the American Highway Association, director of the American Road Builders' Association and a member of the International Road Congress, representing the United States government. He was a member of the American Society of Civil Engineers. He was a member of Cosmos, Chevy Chase and Harvard clubs.

== Personal life ==
Page married Ann Page Shaler of Cambridge, Massachusetts. They had one son Lee. He was the cousin of Walter Hines Page. He lived on Massachusetts Avenue in Washington, D.C.

On December 9, 1918, Logan attended a meeting in Chicago with the executive committee of the American Association of State Highway Officials. Later that same day, he became ill during dinner and died later that night of heart disease at his hotel.
