= Karl S. Bowers =

American politician

Karl S Bowers
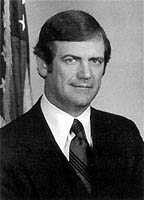

Administrator of the Federal Highway Administration
- In office August 3, 1978 – January 1980
- President: Jimmy Carter
- Preceded by: William M. Cox
- Succeeded by: John S. Hassell Jr.

Deputy Administrator of the Federal Highway Administration
- In office June 5, 1977 – August 3, 1978

Personal details
- Born: October 13, 1941 Estill, South Carolina
- Died: January 31, 2012 (aged 70)
- Spouse: Susan Davis
- Children: 3
- Education: Virginia Southern College; Armstrong-College; University of South Carolina

Karl S. Bowers (October 13, 1941 - January 31, 2012), was an American highway administrator.

He came from a highway background, having served as a South Carolina State Highway Commissioner, 1974 to 1977; Vice Chairman of the State Highway and Public Transportation Commission, 1975; and Chairman of the Commission, 1976. He became the Deputy Federal Highway Administrator in 1977 and served until he took office as Administrator on August 3, 1978, to 1980. He resigned in January 1980.

Under Bowers's tenure, the Federal Highway Administration:

- Accomplished an enviable record in minority recruitment and hiring and in the promotion of the Minority Business Enterprise Program.
- Made significant strides towards the Congressional mandate to expedite completion of the Interstate System.
- Emphasized commitment to rehabilitating and repairing the existing highway network.
- Reduced the inflationary rate in highway construction during 1979 over the previous year, in the face of serious escalating costs.
- Accomplished its highest level of obligations in history – $9.3 billion overall, with $8.5 billion for those programs subject to the congressional law.

== Personal life ==
Bowers was married and has three children.

== Death ==
On January 31, 2012, Karl Bowers died at age 70.
