= Ray Hutchison (politician) =

American politician (1932–2014)

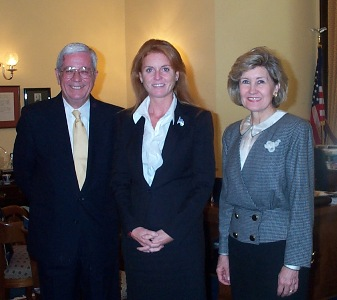
- Hutchison (left) with Kay Bailey Hutchison and Sarah, Duchess of York, 2002

Member of the Texas House of Representatives from the 33-Q district
- In office January 9, 1973 – January 11, 1977
- Preceded by: District established
- Succeeded by: Lee Jackson

Chairmanm of the Texas Republican Party
- In office 1976–1977
- Succeeded by: Ray Barnhart

Personal details
- Born: September 16, 1932 Rockwall, Texas, U.S.
- Died: March 30, 2014 (aged 81) Dallas, Texas, U.S.
- Party: Republican
- Spouse: Kay Bailey Hutchison

Ray Hutchison (September 16, 1932 – March 30, 2014) was an American politician. A member of the Republican Party, he served in the Texas House of Representatives 1973 to 1977 and as chairman of the Texas Republican Party from 1976 to 1977.
