= Travel time reliability =

Travel time reliability refers to the consistency and predictability of travel times on transportation networks. It has been increasingly recognized as a key performance indicator for transportation systems, influencing travelers, service providers, planners, and managers. The importance of travel time reliability has grown as transportation networks have become more congested and travelers have become more sensitive to unpredictable delays.

== Definition and concepts ==
The concept of travel time reliability has evolved significantly since early transportation research began examining variations in travel times. According to the Federal Highway Administration (FHWA), travel time reliability measures the extent of unexpected delay and is formally defined as "the consistency or dependability in travel times, as measured from day-to-day and/or across different times of the day."

Different agencies and researchers have developed varying definitions to capture the multifaceted nature of travel time reliability. The New Zealand Transport Agency (NZTA) provides a more specific definition: "trip time reliability is measured by the unpredictable variations in journey times, which are experienced for a journey undertaken at broadly the same time every day. The impact is related to the day-to-day variations in traffic congestion, typically as a result of day-to-day variations in flow."

This distinction is important because it highlights two fundamentally different approaches to understanding reliability. Travel time reliability research encompasses two main foci that, while sharing common elements, require different analytical approaches:

- Travel behavior: How reliability influences individual travel decisions and choices, including route selection, departure time, and mode choice
- System performance assessment: How reliability measures network efficiency and predictability for operational management and planning purposes

== Types of variability ==
Understanding the sources and types of travel time variability is fundamental to developing effective reliability measures and management strategies. Researchers have developed taxonomies to categorize different types of variability based on their characteristics and underlying causes.

=== Wong-Sussman classification ===
One of the earliest and most influential classifications was developed by Wong and Sussman (1973), who identified three fundamental components that remain relevant today:

- Regular condition-dependent variations: These are predictable, generally cyclical variations in travel time by time-of-day, day of week, and season of year, which can be attributed to temporal variations in human and economic activity patterns
- Irregular condition-dependent variations: These result from irregular and unpredictable changes in network and environmental conditions, such as traffic crashes, weather events, road construction, and other incidents
- Random variations: These reflect minor variations in travel time due to small events that typically affect only individual travelers or small groups, such as missing a traffic signal or unusual behavior of other road users

The distinction between irregular condition-dependent variations and random variations is often one of degree, related to the number of travelers affected and the duration of the disruption.

=== Physical sources ===
Building on earlier conceptual frameworks, more recent research has identified specific physical phenomena that contribute to travel time variability. Kwon et al. (2011) conducted a comprehensive analysis and identified seven primary sources of travel time variability based on observable events and conditions:

1. Traffic incidents and crashes
2. Work zone activity
3. Weather and environmental conditions
4. Fluctuations in day-to-day demand
5. Special events
6. Traffic control devices (especially poorly timed signals and railway crossings)
7. Inadequate base capacity (traffic bottlenecks)

These sources can be further grouped into three broader categories: traffic influencing events (items 1-3), traffic demand variations (items 4-5), and physical road features (items 6-7). This classification provides a more operational framework for understanding and managing the causes of travel time variability.

== Reliability metrics ==
The development of appropriate metrics to quantify travel time reliability has been a central challenge in the field. Multiple metrics have been developed over the decades, each capturing different aspects of variability and serving different analytical purposes. The choice of metric can significantly influence the results and interpretation of reliability analysis.

=== Statistical measures ===
Early research on travel time reliability naturally adopted statistical measures commonly used to describe variability in other fields. However, the application of these measures to travel time data presents unique challenges due to the typically skewed nature of travel time distributions:

- Standard deviation: The traditional statistical measure of variability around the mean, though its appropriateness is questioned for skewed distributions
- Coefficient of variation: Standard deviation divided by mean travel time, providing a normalized measure
- Percentile-based measures: Using specific percentile values (e.g., 90th, 95th percentile) that better reflect the "being late" experience

=== Buffer-based measures ===
Recognizing the limitations of variance-based measures for skewed distributions, transportation agencies have developed buffer-based measures that focus on the upper tail of the travel time distribution. The Federal Highway Administration introduced several related measures:

The Buffer Time Index (BTI) is defined as: BTI = (T_{95} - T̄)/T̄

where T_{95} is the 95th percentile travel time and T̄ is the mean travel time. This measure represents the additional time above average that travelers need to budget to ensure on-time arrival 95% of the time.

=== Skew-width methods ===
Van Lint and Van Zuylen (2005) developed measures that explicitly capture both the asymmetry and spread of travel time distributions, addressing limitations of traditional statistical measures when applied to highly skewed travel time data:

- Skewness (λ^{skew}): (T_{90} - T_{50})/(T_{50} - T_{10}) - indicates the level and direction of skewness
- Width (λ^{var}): (T_{90} - T_{10})/T_{50} - measures the overall spread of the distribution

=== Classification framework ===
The diversity of reliability measures has led researchers to develop comprehensive classification systems. The reliability measures can be broadly classified into three categories, each serving different analytical purposes:

1. Point-based measures: Including probability-based, moment-based, percentile-based, tail-based, and utility-based measures
2. Bound-based measures: Focusing on specific thresholds or ranges of acceptable performance
3. PDF-based measures: Utilizing the entire probability distribution function

== Modeling approaches ==
The modeling of travel time reliability has evolved through several distinct approaches, each reflecting different theoretical perspectives on how travelers perceive and respond to travel time variability. These models serve as the foundation for both understanding traveler behavior and developing policy recommendations.

=== Mean-variance model ===
The mean-variance approach represents one of the earliest attempts to incorporate travel time variability into travel choice models. This approach treats travel time variability as a direct source of disutility, similar to increased travel time. Jackson and Jucker (1982) proposed a foundational framework where utility U is defined as:

U = T + λV(T)

where T is mean travel time, V(T) is variance of travel time, and λ is a parameter measuring the influence of variance on traveler utility.

This model has been widely applied and extended by numerous researchers, though it has been criticized for its assumption that travelers respond directly to statistical measures of variability rather than to the consequences of variability.

=== Scheduling model ===
The scheduling model, developed by Small (1982) and subsequently refined by Noland and Small (1995), takes a fundamentally different approach by focusing on the consequences of travel time variability rather than variability itself. This model recognizes that the disutility from unreliable travel times arises from the costs of arriving earlier or later than preferred:

The model accounts for:

- Schedule Delay Early (SDE): The cost of arriving before the preferred arrival time
- Schedule Delay Late (SDL): The cost of arriving after the preferred arrival time, often with higher penalty

The expected utility under uncertainty is expressed as: E[U(t_{h})] = αE[T(t_{h})] + βE[SDE(t_{h})] + γE[SDL(t_{h})] + θPL(t_{h})

where PL(t_{h}) represents the probability of late arrival, which may carry additional penalty beyond the time-based costs.

=== Mean lateness model ===
The mean lateness model has emerged as a specialized approach, particularly for rail transport analysis in the UK. Unlike the scheduling model, this approach focuses exclusively on lateness, ignoring the costs of early arrival. The model is expressed as:

E(U) = λSchedT + μL^{+}

where SchedT is scheduled journey time and L^{+} is mean lateness at the destination. This approach reflects the particular characteristics of scheduled public transport services, where early arrival is generally not considered problematic.

== Value of travel time reliability (VTTR) ==
The economic valuation of travel time reliability has become a crucial area of research, driven by the need to incorporate reliability benefits into transport project appraisal and policy analysis. The value of travel time reliability (VTTR) represents the monetary value that travelers place on improvements in the consistency and predictability of their travel times.

=== Valuation methodologies ===
Researchers employ various methodological approaches to estimate the economic value that travelers place on reliability improvements, each with distinct advantages and limitations:

- Stated Preference (SP) surveys: These involve presenting respondents with hypothetical choice scenarios that vary in terms of travel time, reliability, and cost. SP surveys allow researchers to control attribute variation precisely but may suffer from hypothetical bias
- Revealed Preference (RP) data: This approach analyzes actual travel choices made by individuals, such as route or mode choice decisions. RP data reflects real behavior but may suffer from limited attribute variation and correlation between attributes
- Combined RP/SP approaches: These integrate both data types to leverage the advantages of each while compensating for their respective limitations

The choice of methodology can significantly influence the estimated values, with SP studies often producing lower values than RP studies for the same contexts.

=== Presentation of reliability in surveys ===
A critical challenge in VTTR research has been the presentation of travel time variability to survey respondents. Several presentation formats have been developed and tested:

- Distribution of travel times: Showing multiple possible journey times with their probabilities
- Histogram representation: Visual displays of travel time frequency distributions
- Scheduling-based formats: Presenting arrival times relative to preferred arrival times

Research has shown that the format used to present reliability can significantly affect the resulting values, with some formats being better understood by respondents than others.

=== National VTTR studies ===
Several countries have conducted national studies to establish official VTTR values for use in transport appraisal. These studies have been particularly prominent in Europe, including:

- United Kingdom (2014-2015)
- Netherlands (2009/2011, 2022)
- Norway (2009, 2018-2019)
- Sweden (2007-2008)
- Germany (2012-2013)

These studies typically use stated preference methods and focus on the reliability ratio (the ratio between the value of reliability and the value of travel time), which commonly ranges from 0.2 to 2.0 across different contexts. The Netherlands 2022 study found notably lower reliability ratios compared to the previous 2009/2011 study, particularly for business travel, with values more aligned with recent Scandinavian studies.

Comparison of reliability ratios across national studies
Country/Year	Car (Commute)	Car (Business)	Train (Commute)	Public Transport (Commute)
Netherlands 2022	0.27	0.21	0.32	0.65
Netherlands 2009/2011	0.4	1.1	0.4	0.4
Norway 2018	0.4	0.4	0.4	0.4
UK 2014	0.33	0.42	-	-

=== Empirical findings ===
Empirical studies have revealed significant variation in the value of reliability across different contexts, trip purposes, and traveler characteristics:

- Trip purpose effects: Business travelers typically place higher values on reliability than leisure travelers
- Mode differences: Public transport users often value reliability more highly than car users
- Income effects: Higher-income travelers generally show greater willingness to pay for reliability improvements
- Regional variations: Studies have found significant differences in VTTR across different countries and regions

Recent findings from the Netherlands (2022) demonstrated reliability ratios ranging from 0.21 to 0.65 across different transport modes and trip purposes, with local public transport showing the highest reliability ratios and business travel by car and train showing the lowest.

=== Reliability ratios ===
The reliability ratio, defined as the marginal rate of substitution between travel time savings and travel time reliability improvements, provides a standardized measure for comparing values across studies and contexts. However, empirical estimates show considerable variation:

- Car travel: typically ranges from 0.2 to 1.4
- Public transport: typically ranges from 0.3 to 2.0
- Extreme values in some studies range from as low as 0.1 to as high as 2.1

This variation reflects differences in study methodology, particularly the way travel time variability is presented to respondents in stated preference experiments, as well as genuine differences across contexts and populations.

Recent reliability ratios by transport mode and trip purpose (Netherlands 2022)
Mode	Commute	Business	Other	All purposes
Car	0.27	0.21	0.35	0.32
Train	0.32	0.11	0.27	0.27
Local public transport	0.65	0.61	0.56	0.59
Air	-	0.30	0.28	0.28

=== Applications in project appraisal ===
The integration of VTTR into transport project appraisal has shown that traditional benefit-cost analyses that ignore reliability effects may significantly underestimate the benefits of transport improvements. Studies suggest that ignoring reliability can lead to 5-50% underestimation of economic benefits from transport infrastructure improvements.

However, widespread application remains limited due to:

- Lack of standardized VTTR values in many countries
- Limited forecasting models that predict reliability changes
- Challenges in measuring baseline reliability conditions

Recent evidence suggests that reliability benefits may constitute a smaller but still significant portion of total transport project benefits than previously estimated. The 2022 Netherlands study found reliability ratios typically ranging from 0.1 to 0.7, suggesting that reliability improvements represent 10-70% of the value of equivalent travel time savings, depending on mode and trip purpose. This indicates that while reliability remains an important component of project appraisal, the magnitude of benefits may be more modest than suggested by earlier studies.

== Applications ==
The practical application of travel time reliability research has expanded significantly as transportation agencies and planners have recognized the importance of reliability in transportation system performance and user satisfaction.

=== Transport planning and appraisal ===
Travel time reliability is increasingly being incorporated into transport project appraisal and policy evaluation. Research suggests that traditional benefit-cost analyses that ignore reliability effects may significantly underestimate the benefits of transport improvements:

Studies indicate that ignoring reliability can lead to 5-50% underestimation of economic benefits from transport infrastructure improvements. Some countries, including New Zealand, have adopted formal requirements for including reliability in economic analysis, while others recommend its inclusion in project evaluation.

=== Traffic management ===
Transportation agencies are integrating reliability considerations into various operational and management activities. Key applications include:

- Traffic assignment models that account for traveler responses to reliability
- Route guidance systems that provide reliability information alongside travel time estimates
- Public transport scheduling that considers reliability requirements
- Freight and logistics planning that accounts for delivery time reliability

=== Network performance assessment ===
Travel time reliability serves as an increasingly important performance indicator for transportation system monitoring and management:

- Traffic congestion and flow breakdown analysis, where reliability measures complement traditional volume-based metrics
- Network vulnerability assessment, identifying critical links whose failure significantly impacts system reliability
- Incident management effectiveness evaluation
- Weather impact evaluation and emergency preparedness planning

The integration of reliability metrics into performance monitoring systems provides transportation agencies with more comprehensive tools for system management and improvement prioritization.

== Data collection and measurement ==
The collection and analysis of travel time data for reliability assessment presents unique methodological challenges that distinguish it from traditional traffic analysis. The temporal dimension of reliability requires sustained data collection over extended periods to capture the full range of variability.

Travel time reliability research relies on various data collection approaches, each with distinct implications for the interpretation and applicability of results:

- Longitudinal data: Following the same travelers over extended periods to capture their cumulative experience of variability
- Cross-sectional data: Observing different travelers using the same facilities over shorter time periods
- GPS and probe vehicle data: Providing real-time travel time measurements across large geographic areas
- Loop detector data: Offering consistent fixed-point measurements but requiring travel time estimation

The choice between these methods fundamentally affects the interpretation of reliability measures, with longitudinal data better reflecting individual traveler experiences while cross-sectional data provides more readily available information for system performance assessment.

== Research development ==
Research on travel time reliability has evolved through distinct phases, reflecting both technological advances and changing transportation challenges. The field can be traced back to the 1970s, with Herman and Lam (1974) providing early contributions on day-to-day travel time variations and Sterman and Schofer (1976) examining public transport reliability.

After a relative hiatus in the 1980s, research resumed vigorously in the mid-1990s coinciding with increased interest in network reliability and growing concern about traffic congestion. The field has experienced substantial growth since 2000, driven by technological advances in data collection and increased policy interest in reliability as a performance measure.

Key research developments have included:

- Development of theoretical frameworks linking reliability to traveler behavior
- Empirical studies of the relationships between traffic conditions and reliability
- Integration of reliability considerations into traffic assignment and network analysis models
- Economic valuation methodologies for reliability improvements
- Advanced statistical and computational methods for reliability analysis

Current research continues to address fundamental challenges in definition, measurement, and application of reliability concepts across different transportation contexts.

== Future directions ==
The field of travel time reliability research faces several ongoing challenges and emerging opportunities that will shape future developments:

Current research priorities include:

- Standardization of reliability definitions and metrics across different applications and jurisdictions
- Integration of reliability measures into large-scale traffic assignment models for planning applications
- Understanding the relationship between individual link reliability and route-level reliability
- Development of real-time reliability prediction systems for traveler information
- Assessment of emerging technologies' impact on reliability, including connected and autonomous vehicles

The increasing availability of high-resolution traffic data and advances in computational methods are creating new opportunities for reliability analysis while also highlighting the need for more sophisticated theoretical frameworks to interpret and apply these data effectively.

Additional challenges for future research include:

- Development of forecasting models that predict reliability changes from infrastructure investments
- Better understanding of how technological improvements in vehicles affect the value travelers place on reliability
- Integration of reliability considerations into emerging mobility services and shared transportation modes
- Development of equity-weighted reliability values for project appraisal
- Investigation of the relationship between reliability and sustainability objectives in transportation planning

== See also ==
- Traffic congestion
- Transportation planning
- Travel behavior
- Traffic flow
- Transportation economics
- Intelligent transportation system
- Value of time
