= Thomas Harris MacDonald =

American civil engineer

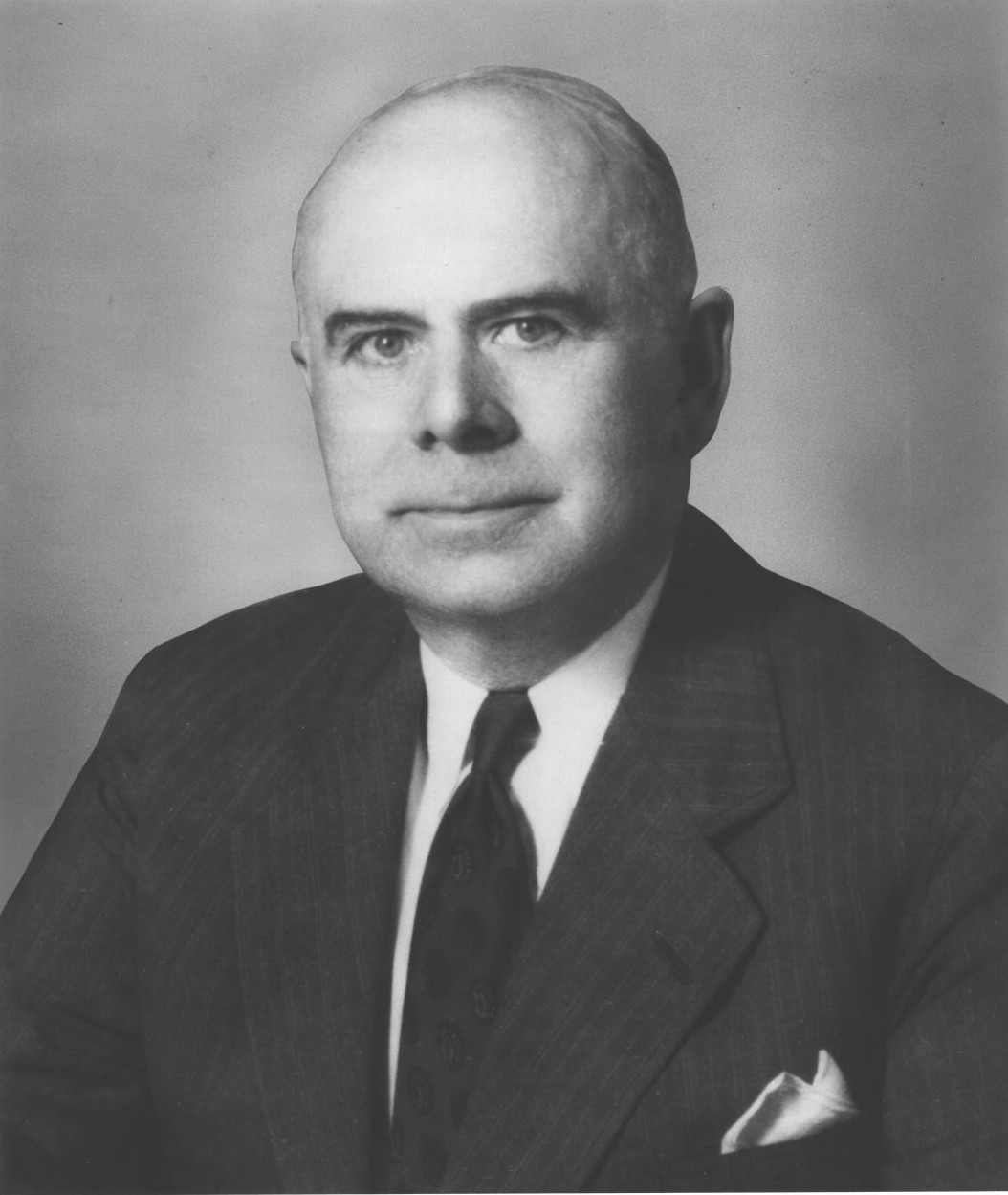
- Thomas Harris MacDonald

Commissioner of the Bureau of Public Roads
- In office April 1, 1919 – March 31, 1953
- Preceded by: Logan Waller Page
- Succeeded by: Francis Victor du Pont

Personal details
- Born: July 23, 1881 Leadville, Colorado
- Died: April 7, 1957 (aged 75) College Station, Texas, U.S.
- Education: Iowa State University

Thomas Harris "Chief" MacDonald (July 23, 1881 – April 7, 1957) was an American civil engineer and politician who supervised the construction of the Federal-aid highway system in the era before the creation of the Interstate Highway System. He served as chief of the Iowa State Highway Commission, chief of the Bureau of Public Roads from 1919 to 1939, and commissioner of the Bureau of Public Roads from 1939 to March 31, 1953, when he resigned shortly after President Dwight D. Eisenhower's first term began on January 20, 1953.

He directed national road policy for 34 years, serving under seven different U.S. Presidents. During his time, he supervised the creation of 3.5 million miles of highways. Later, he personally directed the creation of the Alaskan Highway, and helped the countries of Central America in building the Inter-American Highway. "[He] was a force as powerful as his counterpart at the FBI, J. Edgar Hoover," insists historian Stephen B. Goddard, "yet was virtually unknown to most Americans."

== Biography ==
=== Early life and career ===
Born a Scotsman in a Leadville, Colorado log-cabin to John MacDonald and Sarah Elizabeth Harris, his family returned to Poweshiek County, Iowa when he was young. (He attended elementary and high school at public schools in Montezuma, Iowa, the county seat.) His father was a partner in T. Harris & Company, a grain and lumber dealer founded by his maternal grandfather, and Thomas grew up frustrated with the poor state of local roads. Lumber traveled in wooden wagons which were unusable in the spring and fall mud. Most people of the era saw railroads as the solution, but MacDonald went to Iowa State College of Agricultural and Mechanical Arts at Ames (transferring after a year at Iowa State Teachers College) to learn road building as a student of Anson Marston. He received his bachelor's degree in civil engineering in 1904. (His senior thesis, written with L. T. Gaylord, was entitled "Iowa Good Roads Investigations.") In 1907, he married Elizabeth Dunham of Ames, Iowa and they had two children before her death in 1935.

After graduation from college, he was named Assistant in Charge of Good Roads Investigation for the Iowa State Highway Commission (ISHC). He then became chief engineer and then Iowa highway commissioner, overseeing a budget of just $5,000 a year. He was soon named president of the American Association of State Highway Officials (AASHO) and at the age of 38, was suggested by that group to serve as chief of the Bureau of Public Roads. Congress quickly accepted.

He demanded (and received) a salary increase from $4,500 to $6,000 and remained an AASHO board member. He also insisted on adoption of "the most liberal policy possible under the existing laws, in order to get actual construction work under way as early and as rapidly [as reasonable]."

MacDonald pulled together a coalition including the Portland Cement Association, the American Automobile Association, the American Road Builders Association, the Association of Highway Officials of the North Atlantic States, the Rubber Association of America, the Mississippi Valley Association of State Highway Officials, the National Paving Brick Manufacturer's Association, the National Automobile Chamber of Commerce, and more.

MacDonald's popularity was such that when visiting towns he was given the finest hotel accommodations, free food and drink, and a guided tour of local roads. In 1920, an impostor took advantage of this to swindle the citizens of Blackwell, Oklahoma by taking advantage of their hospitality and passing bad checks.

MacDonald was known to have a severe stare. "When you were in Mr. MacDonald's presence you were quiet. You spoke only if he asked you to," reports one subordinate. "He came as close ... to characterize what I would call royalty."

He began what was then called a propaganda campaign to argue that good roads were a human right, with radio addresses as early as 1923; the creation of the Highway Education Board (HEB), an affiliate of the BPR that posed as an independent organization; and the Highway Research Board. The HEB wrote materials for schools, held nationwide contests, published booklets, and had a speakers bureau. He worked closely with the industries that would benefit from roads to extend his Federal budget.

In January 1925, MacDonald published an article arguing for the adoption of uniform traffic laws and traffic devices across the United States. He specifically argued for "uniform markings and signs" and for "Interstate continuity of routes". He also argued that the term "inter-State [sic]" was a "fairer descriptive term" for the federally-funded highways than "Federal-aid highways".

He persuaded Congress to grant him the authority to sign contracts with the states. He used this to write contracts promising the states money, which the U.S. Government was then obliged to fulfill (the U.S. Constitution says that Congress may not abrogate any contracts). President Franklin Delano Roosevelt fought bitterly to have MacDonald's powers repealed.

In 1947, toward the end of his career, MacDonald argued for an end of "the preferential use of private automobiles" in cities and said the AASHO should "promote the patronage of mass transit... Unless this reversal can be accomplished, indeed, the traffic problems of the larger cities may become well nigh insoluble." But it was too late; in 1953, President Eisenhower asked for his resignation. He died in College Station, Texas in 1957.

=== Legacy ===
In 1949, Robert Moses insisted "There is no better example of nonpolitical, effective, and prudent Federal, State and local cooperation than that afforded by the Public Roads Administration for almost 30 years under the respected leadership of Commissioner Thomas H. MacDonald."

== Political views ==
MacDonald believed that, "Next to the education of the child," road building was "the greatest public responsibility."

He argued, against critics and eventually evidence to the contrary, that roads would never take traffic away from railroads, but instead would complement them. "Perhaps what set MacDonald apart from his fellow engineers and certainly his railroad competitors," writes one historian, "was his early recognition that to sell roads, Washington would have to market them like a detergent."

== See also ==
- Robert Moses
- The Power Broker
- Herbert S. Fairbank
