= Robert E. Farris =

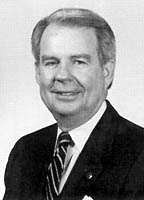

Administrator of the Federal Highway Administration
- In office June 8, 1988 – May 17, 1989
- President: Ronald Reagan; George H.W Bush
- Preceded by: Ray Barnhart
- Succeeded by: Thomas D. Larson

Personal details
- Born: March 7, 1928 Etowah, Tennessee
- Died: November 27, 2013 (aged 85) Erwin, Tennessee
- Spouse: Dorothy Ann Wright Farris
- Children: 2

Robert E. Farris (March 7, 1928 – November 27, 2013) was sworn in as Federal Highway Administrator on June 8, 1988, after serving as the FHWA's Deputy Federal Highway Administrator from August 1986.

Before joining the FHWA, Farris was affiliated with the American Association of State Highway and Transportation Officials, serving as Chairman of its Standing Committee on Aviation, and on the executive committee and Policy Board. Farris also was on the executive committee of the Transportation Research Board.

In Tennessee, Farris served as Commissioner of the Department of Transportation from 1981 to 1985. He also was president of his own business, specializing in the marketing of competition swimwear.

As administrator, Farris strengthened motor carrier regulations concerning the licensing and testing of truck and bus drivers. In addition, Farris initiated a series of studies to prepare the FHWA to meet the challenges of the future.

In highway research and development, he established the design for an expanded program to address highway needs through the year 2020. Under the design, the FHWA would conduct research projects to solve problems in areas such as traffic congestion, highway safety, and environmental concerns.
