= William M. Cox =

American politician

William Meredith Cox
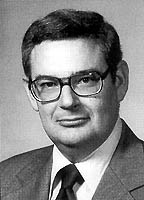

Administrator of the Federal Highway Administration
- In office April 7, 1977 – May 1, 1978
- President: Jimmy Carter
- Preceded by: Norbert Tiemann
- Succeeded by: Karl S. Bowers

Member of the Kentucky House of Representatives from the 10th district
- In office January 1, 1968 – January 1, 1970
- Preceded by: John Henry Cox
- Succeeded by: Omar Parish

Personal details
- Born: February 4, 1942 Madisonville, Kentucky
- Died: November 19, 2017 (aged 75) Louisville, Kentucky
- Education: University of Kentucky

William M. Cox (February 4, 1942 – November 19, 2017) was an American politician, highway administrator and trucking executive. Cox joined the Federal Highway Administration in 1977 from Madisonville, Kentucky, where he was the senior vice president of Ligon Specialized Hauler Inc.

He was one of the youngest persons ever elected to the Kentucky legislature, but did not seek re-election after being one of a minority of Democrats who supported Republican Gov. Louie Nunn's increase in the state sales tax from 3% to 5%. Cox said he voted for the tax so Nunn would fund a community college and vocational school in Madisonville. He was active in the successful campaigns of Julian Carroll of Paducah for lieutenant governor in 1971 and governor in 1975. He was a special assistant to Carroll for legislative relations, then vice chairman of the Kentucky Public Service Commission. He also served as president of the Kentucky Motor Transport Association, a trucking lobby.

As administrator of the Federal Highway Administration, Cox was a major force in the development of comprehensive surface-transportation legislation. He was noted for his untiring efforts to streamline administrative processes by eliminating or minimizing excessive regulations and "red tape." Under his leadership, the FHwA made significant progress in minority employment and participation of minority business enterprises in FHwA programs.

After about a year, Cox resigned the job to run for lieutenant governor of Kentucky. he was the apparent favorite until he became embroiled in a controversy regarding the federal investigation of the Carroll administration. After candidate Jim Vernon said on a TV debate that Cox was involved in the probe, Cox repeatedly threatened to file suit against Vernon, then said he would not because he would have little chance of prevailing. The controversy created an opening for Martha Layne Collins, clerk of the state Court of Appeals, who won the primary with 109,031 votes. Cox finished second in the seven-way race with 105,693 votes. In the 1983 primary he supported Harvey Sloane, who lost to Collins, and in the fall voted for Republican nominee Jim Bunning, saying Collins had never asked him for his support.

After Collins left the governorship in 1987, Cox stepped up his political activity. He defeated Madisonville Mayor O.L. Lantaff in 1989 but did not seek re-election in 1993. He was mentioned as a possible candidate against First District U.S. Rep. Carroll Hubbard but did not run. His son, lawyer Will Cox, was elected mayor in 2006 but was defeated for re-election in 2010.

On November 19, 2017, Bill Cox died peacefully surrounded by his immediate family at 5:11 a.m. Eastern Time on Sunday at Baptist Health Hospital in Louisville, Kentucky.
