= Brandye Hendrickson =

American politician

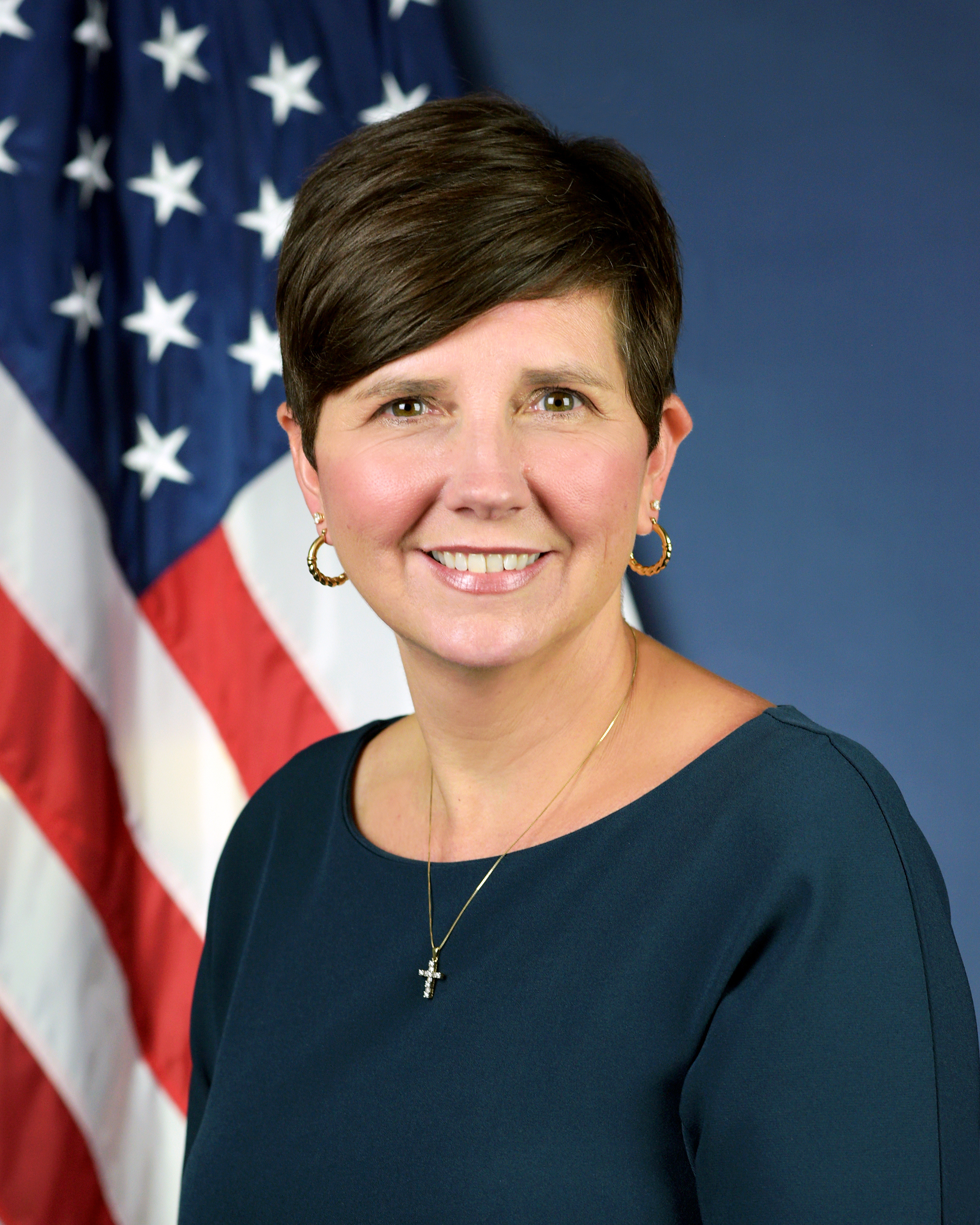

Acting Administrator of the Federal Highway Administration
- In office July 24, 2017 – May 6, 2019
- President: Donald Trump
- Preceded by: Gregory G. Nadeau
- Succeeded by: Nicole Nason

Deputy Administrator of the Federal Highway Administration
- In office July 24, 2017 – July 19, 2019
- Succeeded by: Mala K. Parker
- President: Donald Trump

Brandye Hendrickson was named Deputy Administrator of the Federal Highway Administration on July 24, 2017, after having been Commissioner of the Indiana Department of Transportation. She also became Acting Administrator of the Federal Highway Administration until Nicole Nason was confirmed by the Senate. On July 19, 2019, Brandye left her position to take another deputy position at the American Association of State Highway and Transportation Officials.

She has a bachelor's degree from Indiana University Bloomington (1995) and is a professional in Human Resources.
