= Local Technical Assistance Program =

US Federal Highway Administration technology transfer program

The Local Technical Assistance Program (LTAP) is a Federal Highway Administration technology transfer program that provides technical assistance and training to local highway departments in the United States. It transfers knowledge of innovative transportation technology to both urban and rural local communities in the United States.

The program is a partnership effort with funding provided from federal, state, and local agency resources. Each LTAP center is funded with a 50% federal share, with the remaining half funded by the state and/or local agencies. There are 51 LTAP centers, one in each state, and one which serves Puerto Rico and the Virgin Islands.

LTAP centers support nearly 38,000 local government agencies and over 540 federally recognized tribes in maintaining and improving transportation infrastructure and services, utilising the latest technology and available information. Local transportation agencies expend over $30 billion annually to maintain 2.9 million miles (4.7 million kilometres) of roads, which include over 290,000 bridges.

LTAP offers a range of tools such as training events, technology transfer resources, and personalized assistance. These items help local agencies enhance their transportation operations. Many state transportation departments also benefit from LTAP services.

Common topics for training and assistance include pavement management and maintenance, road works safety, traffic signs and pavement markings, public works department management, snow and ice control, and drainage.
