= Shailen Bhatt =

American government official

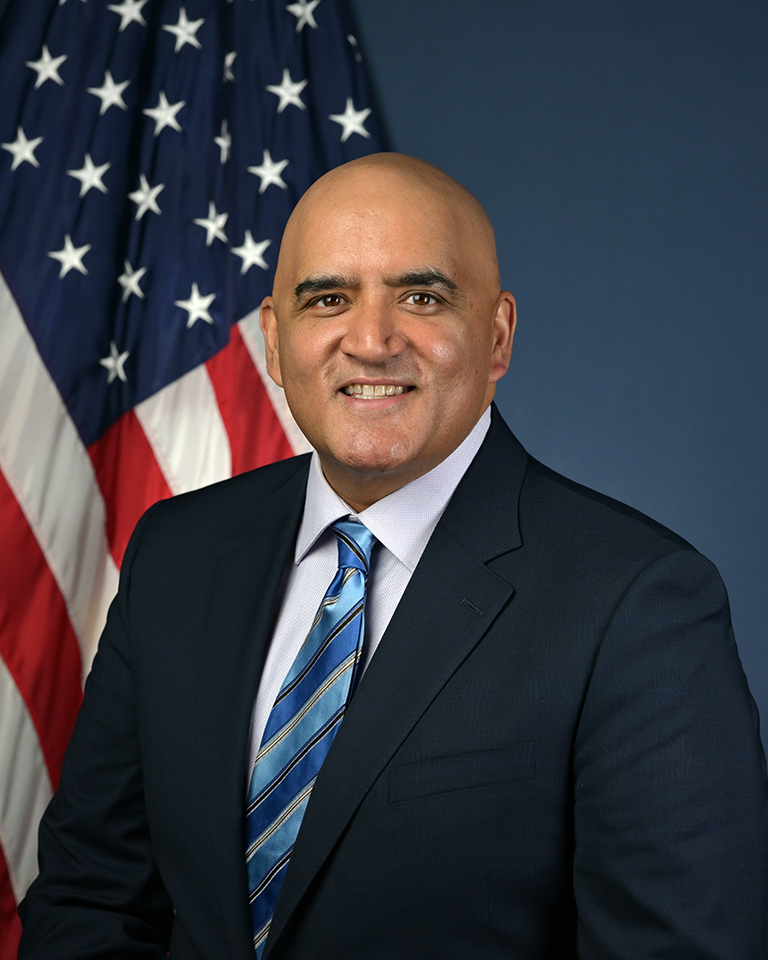

Administrator of the Federal Highway Administration
- In office January 13, 2023 – September 10, 2024
- President: Joe Biden
- Preceded by: Nicole Nason (2021)
- Succeeded by: Sean McMaster

Personal details
- Education: Western Kentucky University (BA)

Shailen P. Bhatt is an American transportation official who served as administrator of the Federal Highway Administration from January 2023 to September 2024.

== Education ==
Bhatt earned a Bachelor of Arts degree in economics from Western Kentucky University.

== Career ==
From 2005 to 2008, Bhatt served as deputy executive director of the Kentucky Transportation Cabinet. From 2009 to 2011, he served as associate administrator for policy and government affairs for the Federal Highway Administration. From 2011 to 2014, he was the secretary of the Delaware Department of Transportation. From 2014 to 2017, he served as executive director of the Colorado Department of Transportation. From 2017 to 2021, he was the president and CEO of the ITS America, a transportation lobbying organization. He joined AECOM, an engineering firm, as senior vice president for global transportation innovation and alternative delivery in 2021.

Bhatt was nominated in July 2022 by President Joe Biden to be the administrator of the Federal Highway Administration. His nomination was confirmed by the Senate on December 8, 2022. He was sworn in by Secretary Pete Buttigieg on January 13, 2023.
