= Charles Dwight Curtiss =

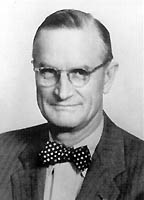

Administrator of the Federal Highway Administration
- In office January 14, 1955 – December 1957
- President: Dwight D. Eisenhower
- Preceded by: Francis Victor du Pont
- Succeeded by: John A. Volpe

Personal details
- Born: December 23, 1887 Camden, Michigan
- Died: July 9, 1983 (aged 95) Medford, New Jersey
- Education: Michigan State University

Charles Dwight Curtiss (December 23, 1887 – July 9, 1983) was an Administrator of the United States' Federal Highway Administration from 1955 to 1957.

He attended Michigan State College. After graduating in 1911, he went on to receive a master's degree from Columbia University and a degree in civil engineering from Iowa State College. After holding a variety of jobs, including bridge inspector for the Michigan State Highway Department, he joined the U.S. Army Corps of Engineers and served in France during World War I. He rose to the rank of captain, resulting in his lifelong nickname of "Cap."

Following the war, he joined the Bureau of Public Roads (BPR) on July 30, 1919, as the assistant to Chief MacDonald. In 1943, he was appointed deputy commissioner for finance and management, the post he held when he was selected to be the commissioner in 1955. He was sworn in on January 14, 1955.

In addition to representing the bureau in congressional forums in 1955 and 1956, he began to reorganize BPR to accommodate the big, upcoming interstate highway program. He initiated the program immediately after President Eisenhower signed the Federal-Aid Highway Act of 1956. In a November 1956 speech to the American Association of State Highway Officials, Cap Curtiss captured the essence of the task ahead: "The future economic progress of our country depends in no small measure on the success of this program. We must not fail." Curtiss remained in charge of the bureau until October 1956, when the first federal highway administrator, John A. Volpe, took office. Remaining with BPR, Commissioner Curtiss was responsible for day-to-day operations until he retired in December 1957. On Curtiss' retirement day, BPR's work came to a standstill when more than 500 present and past employees and friends joined in honoring the commissioner and his wife. Following his retirement, Curtiss served as a consultant to the International Road Federation and the American Road Builders Association. In 1963, he served as chairman of the Highway Research Board. He died on June 9, 1983, from a heart attack in his retirement home in Medford, New Jersey.
