= Turner-Fairbank Highway Research Center =

Facility in McLean, Virginia

Turner-Fairbank Highway Research Center is a U.S. Department of Transportation facility located in McLean, Virginia. The center carries out research studies and was renamed after Francis Turner in 1983. It had been known as the Fairbank Highway Research Station for Herbert S. Fairbank, an official at FHWA's predecessor, the Bureau of Public Roads. It is located adjacent to the Central Intelligence Agency headquarters.
