= Rex Marion Whitton =

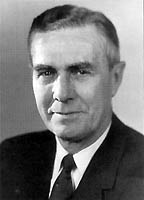

Administrator of the Federal Highway Administration
- In office January 20, 1961 – December 30, 1966
- President: John F Kennedy; Lyndon B. Johnson
- Preceded by: Bertram D. Tallamy
- Succeeded by: Lowell K. Bridwell

Personal details
- Born: August 7, 1898 Jackson County, Missouri
- Died: July 7, 1981 (aged 82) Kansas City, Missouri

Rex Marion Whitton (August 7, 1898 – July 7, 1981) was an American administrator. He retired as Administrator of the Federal Highway Administration on December 30, 1966, after a career of public service that spanned nearly the entire history of modern highway construction in the United States. At his retirement, he had completed more than 46 years of continuous highway work, 40 of which were spent in his native Missouri.

Whitton rose through the ranks in the highway industry, from a member of a highway survey crew in 1920 to chief engineer for the State of Missouri in 1951. He also held the positions of assistant resident engineer, resident engineer, chief of survey party, plans designer, assistant district engineer, district engineer, and engineer of maintenance.

During his tenure as Administrator of the Federal Highway Administration, the Bureau of Public Roads was reorganized to increase operational efficiency and instill new confidence. In 1960 he was named one of the top ten public works men of the year by the American Public Works Association in cooperation with Kiwanis International.

He was also resident of the American Association of State Highway Officials (AASHO), now the American Association of State Highway and Transportation Officials (AASHTO).
