= Thomas D. Larson =

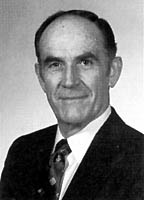

Administrator of the Federal Highway Administration
- In office August 10, 1989 – January 20, 1993
- President: George H. W. Bush
- Preceded by: Robert E. Farris
- Succeeded by: Rodney E. Slater

Personal details
- Born: September 28, 1928 Philipsburg, Pennsylvania
- Died: July 20, 2006 (aged 77) State College, Pennsylvania

Thomas D. Larson (September 28, 1928 – July 20, 2006) was an American administrator, who was sworn in as the Federal Highway Administrator on August 10, 1989. A native of Pennsylvania, Larson came to the FHWA after a career as a researcher, Professor of Civil Engineering, and administrator at the Pennsylvania State University. He was Pennsylvania's Secretary of Transportation for eight years, and a leader in the American Association of State Highway and Transportation Officials and the Transportation Research Board.

Larson led the preparation of the National Transportation Policy in March 1990 and played a strong role in molding the landmark Intermodal Surface Transportation Efficiency Act of 1991 (ISTEA). To match this first major restructuring of the Federal-aid Highway Program and rethinking of the Agency's mission since the Interstate era began in 1956, Larson oversaw an FHWA reorganization and established the agency-wide strategic planning initiative (FHWA 2000) that prepared FHWA to better meet State and local needs in implementing ISTEA for the Nation's ever-increasing mobility needs.

Additional highlights during his tenure included a continuing decline in the highway fatality rate to an all-time low, a dramatic increase in the research, technology, and intelligent Vehicle Highway System programs, and continued support for university transportation centers. During his service, Larson emphasized innovation and partnerships, renewed the commitment to environmental sensitivity as embodied in the FHWA Environmental Policy Statement of April 1990, reinvigorated motor carrier safety enforcement, and expanded diversity education and training for all employees.
