= Ray Barnhart =

American politician (1928–2013)

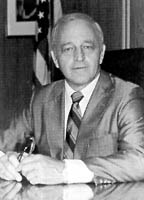

Administrator of the Federal Highway Administration
- In office February 12, 1981 – December 31, 1987
- President: Ronald Reagan
- Preceded by: John S. Hassell Jr.
- Succeeded by: Robert E. Farris

Chairman of the Texas Republican Party
- In office 1977–1979
- Preceded by: Ray Hutchinson
- Succeeded by: Chet Upham

Member of the Texas House of Representatives from the 100th district
- In office January 9, 1973 – January 14, 1975
- Preceded by: Roger H. Thurmond, Jr.
- Succeeded by: Samuel Hudson III

Personal details
- Born: Ray Anderson Barnhart; January 12, 1928 Elgin, Illinois, U.S.
- Died: May 26, 2013 (aged 85)
- Party: Republican

Ray Anderson Barnhart (January 12, 1928 – May 26, 2013) was an American businessman and politician who served as Federal Highway Administrator from 1981 to 1987. He started his career as City Councilman in Pasadena, Texas. He was a member of the Texas House of Representatives 100th district from and served from January 9, 1973 to January 14, 1975. He was an Eagle Scout. He also served as Chairman of the Texas State Republican Party.

== Early life ==
Ray Anderson Barnhart was born on January 12, 1928, in Elgin, Illinois. After graduating from Elgin High School, he joined the United States Army in 1946. He later graduated from Marietta College and the University of Houston with a Master of Arts degree in 1951.
