= National Highway Traffic Safety Administration =

American agency of the Executive Branch of the Department of Transportation

National Highway Traffic Safety Administration (NHTSA)

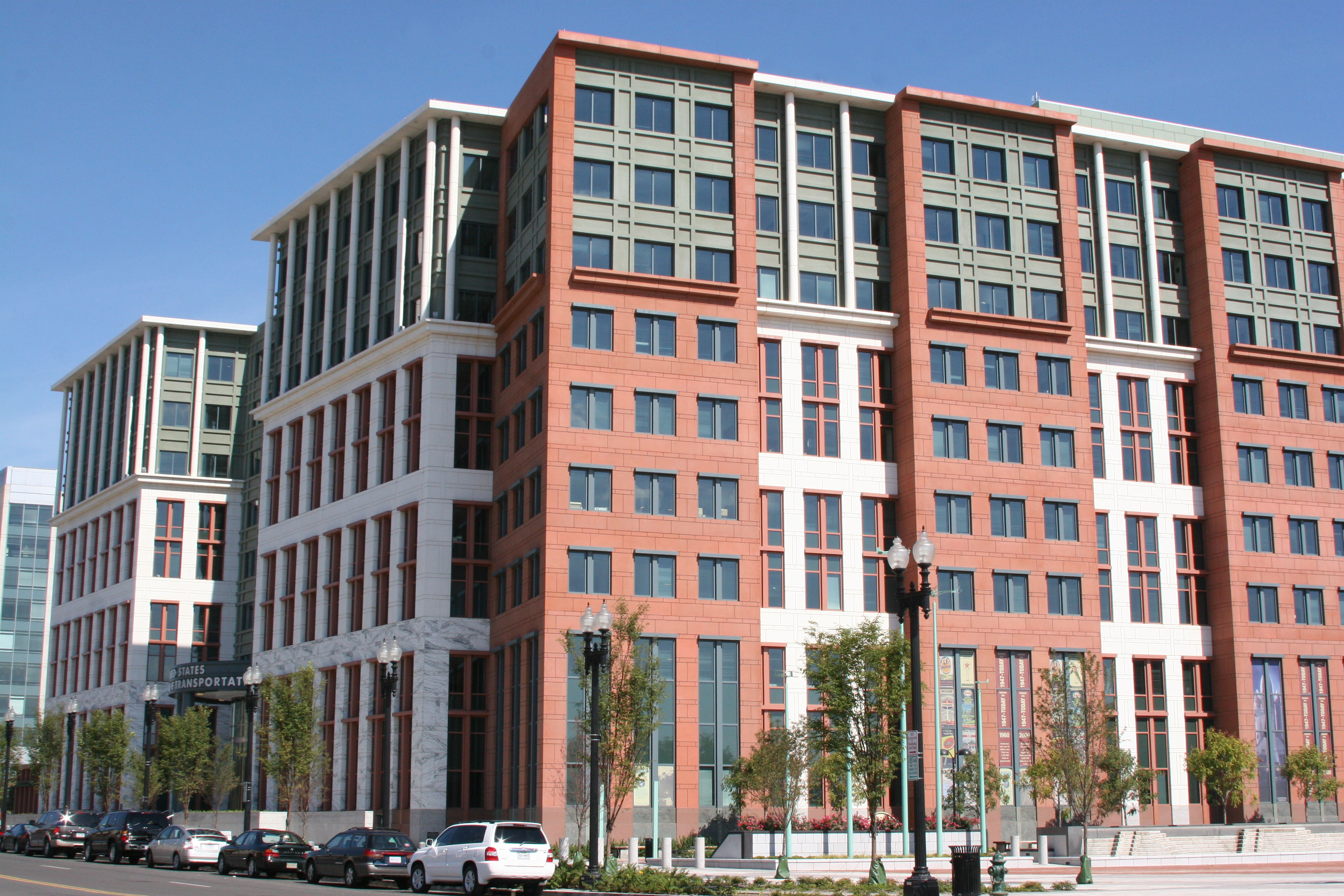
- NHTSA is housed in the USDOT headquarters at the Navy Yard (Washington, D.C.) in Washington, D.C.

Agency overview
- Formed: December 31, 1970; 55 years ago
- Preceding agency: National Highway Safety Bureau
- Jurisdiction: U.S. motor vehicles
- Headquarters: Washington, D.C., U.S.
- Employees: 675 (FY 2023)
- Annual budget: $1.3 billion (FY 2025)
- Agency executives: Jonathan Morrison, Administrator; Lee White, Deputy Administrator
- Parent department: Department of Transportation (USDOT)
- Website: nhtsa.gov

Footnotes
- Leadership

The National Highway Traffic Safety Administration (NHTSA /ˈnɪtsə/ NITS-ə) is an agency of the U.S. federal government, part of the Department of Transportation, focused on automobile safety regulations.

The NHTSA is charged with writing and enforcing Federal Motor Vehicle Safety Standards (FMVSS), regulations for motor vehicle theft resistance, and fuel economy, as part of the corporate average fuel economy (CAFE) system. FMVSS 209 was the first standard to become effective on March 1, 1967. The NHTSA licenses vehicle manufacturers and importers, allows or blocks the import of vehicles and safety-regulated vehicle parts, administers the vehicle identification number (VIN) system, develops the crash test dummies used in U.S. safety testing as well as the test protocols themselves, and provides vehicle insurance cost information. The agency has asserted preemptive regulatory authority over greenhouse gas emissions, but this has been disputed by state regulatory agencies such as the California Air Resources Board.

The Federal Motor Vehicle Safety Standards are codified under Title 49 of the Code of Federal Regulations. Additional federal vehicle standards are contained elsewhere in the CFR. Another of NHTSA's activities is the collection of data about motor vehicle crashes, available in various data files maintained by the National Center for Statistics and Analysis, in particular the Fatality Analysis Reporting System (FARS), the Crash Investigation Sampling System (CISS, where technicians investigate a random sample of police crash reports), and others.

Other aspects of U.S. traffic safety, including road design, traffic enforcement, and crash investigation are outside of the NHTSA's jurisdiction.

== History ==
In 1964 and 1966, public pressure grew in the United States to increase the safety of cars, culminating in the publishing of Unsafe at Any Speed, a critique of the motor vehicle industry, by Ralph Nader, a lawyer-cum-activist, and the report prepared by the National Academy of Sciences entitled Accidental Death and Disability: The Neglected Disease of Modern Society.

In 1966, Congress held a series of publicized hearings regarding highway safety, passed legislation to make the installation of seat belts mandatory, and created the U.S. Department of Transportation on October 15, 1966 (Pub. L. 89–670). Legislation signed by President Lyndon Johnson earlier on September 9, 1966, included the National Traffic and Motor Vehicle Safety Act (Pub. L. 89–563) and Highway Safety Act (Pub. L. 89–564) that created the National Traffic Safety Agency, the National Highway Safety Agency, and the National Highway Safety Bureau, predecessor agencies to what would eventually become the NHTSA. Once the Federal Motor Vehicle Safety Standards (FMVSS) came into effect, vehicles not certified by the maker or importer as compliant with US safety standards were no longer legal to import into the United States.

Congress established the NHTSA in 1970 with the Highway Safety Act of 1970 (Title II of Pub. L. 91–605, 84 Stat. 1713, enacted December 31, 1970, at 84 Stat. 1739). In 1972, the Motor Vehicle Information and Cost Savings Act (Pub. L. 92–513, 86 Stat. 947, enacted October 20, 1972) expanded the NHTSA's scope to include consumer information programs. Despite improvements in vehicle design and public awareness of issues like drunk driving, traffic fatalities have remained stubbornly high. In the early 2020s, more than 40,000 U.S. residents died in automotive collisions yearly.

The NHTSA has conducted numerous high-profile investigations of automotive safety issues, including the Audi 5000/60 Minutes affair, the Ford Explorer rollover problem, and the Toyota sticky accelerator pedal problem. The agency has proposed to mandate Electronic Stability Control on all passenger vehicles by the 2012 model year. This technology was first brought to public attention in 1997, with the Swedish moose test. Most of the reduction in vehicle fatality rates during the last third of the 20th century was gained from the initial NHTSA safety standards during 1968–1984 and subsequent voluntary changes in vehicle crashworthiness by vehicle manufacturers.

== Regulatory performance ==
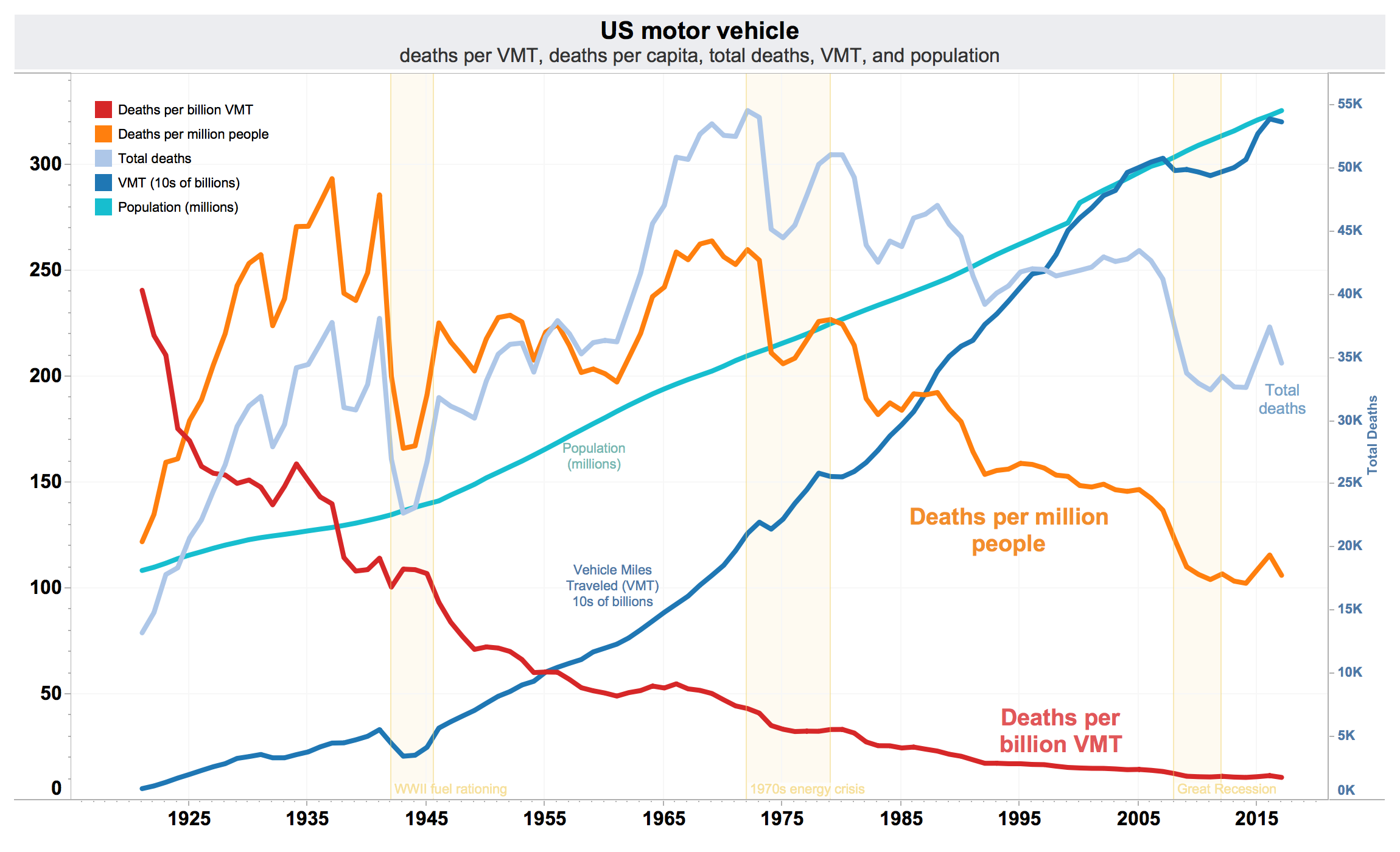
Annual US traffic fatalities per billion vehicle miles traveled (red), miles traveled (blue), per one million people (orange), total annual deaths (light blue), VMT in tens of billions (dark blue), and population in millions (teal), from 1921 to 2017

Audits by the U.S. Department of Transportation's Office of the Inspector General in 2011, 2014, 2015, 2016, 2018, and 2021 have concluded that the NHTSA is largely ineffectual; the 2021 audit found the NHTSA failing to issue or update Federal Motor Vehicle Safety Standards effectively or to act within timeframes on petitions and investigations; having no process in place for critical agency responsibilities like evaluating petitions, and having failed to implement consensus recommendations derived from the Inspector General's audit a decade before, in 2011. The 2018 audit found the NHTSA incapable of conducting adequate, timely safety recalls. The 2015 audit found the NHTSA's collection and analysis of safety-related data to be inadequate, and the agency to be lackadaisical and careless in examining safety defects.

Government data (from FARS for the U.S.) in a 2004 book by former General Motors safety researcher Leonard Evans shows other countries achieving greater traffic safety improvements over time than those achieved in the United States:

Country	1979 fatalities	2002 fatalities	Percent change
United States	51,093	42,815	−16.2%
Great Britain	6,352	3,431	−46.0%
Canada	5,863	2,936	−49.9%
Australia	3,508	1,715	−51.1%

Research suggests one reason the U.S. continues to lag in traffic safety is the relatively high prevalence in the U.S. of pickup trucks and SUVs, which a 2003 study by the U.S. Transportation Research Board found are significantly less safe than passenger cars. Comparisons of past data with the present in the U.S. can result in distortions, due to a significant population increase and since the level of large commercial truck traffic has substantially increased from the 1960s, but highway capacity has not kept up. However, other factors exert significant influence; Canada has lower roadway death and injury rates despite a vehicle mix and regulations similar to those of the U.S. Nevertheless, the widespread use of truck-based vehicles as passenger carriers is correlated with roadway deaths and injuries not only directly by dint of vehicular safety performance per se, but also indirectly through the relatively low fuel costs that facilitate the use of such vehicles in North America. Motor vehicle fatalities decline as gasoline prices increase.

In January 2025, the NHTSA opened a preliminary investigation into 877,710 General Motors trucks and SUVs (model years 2019–2024) after receiving 39 complaints and reports of engine failures caused by bearing issues. The probe aims to assess the scope and severity of the problem, with General Motors stating its full cooperation.

== International counterparts and the grey market ==
In 1958, under the auspices of the United Nations, a consortium known as the Economic Commission for Europe was established to standardize vehicle regulations across Europe. Its goals included promoting best practices in vehicle design and equipment and reducing technical barriers to pan-European vehicle trade and traffic. This organization eventually evolved into the World Forum for Harmonization of Vehicle Regulations, which developed what became the UN Regulations on vehicle design, construction, and safety and emissions performance for vehicles and their components. While many countries adopted or required adherence to the UN Regulations, the United States did not recognize these standards and restricted the importation of vehicles and components not certified by manufacturers as compliant with U.S. regulations.

Because of the unavailability in America of certain vehicle models, a grey market arose in the late 1970s. This provided a method to acquire vehicles not officially offered in the United States, but enough vehicles imported this way were faulty, shoddy, and unsafe that Mercedes-Benz of North America helped launch a successful congressional lobbying effort to close down the grey market in 1988. As a result, it was no longer possible to import foreign vehicles into the United States as a personal import, with few exceptions—primarily vehicles meeting Canadian regulations substantially similar to those of the United States, and vehicles imported temporarily for display or research purposes. In practice, the gray market involved a few thousand cars annually, before its virtual elimination in 1988.

In 1998, the NHTSA exempted vehicles older than 25 years from the rules it administers, since these are presumed to be collector vehicles. In 1999, certain very low production volume specialist vehicles were also exempt for "Show and Display" purposes.

In the mid-1960s, when the framework was established for US vehicle safety regulations, the US auto market was an oligopoly, with three companies (GM, Ford, and Chrysler) controlling 85% of the market. The ongoing ban on newer vehicles considered safe in countries with lower vehicle-related death rates has created a perception that an effect of the NHTSA's regulatory activity is to protect the U.S. market for a modified oligopoly consisting of the three U.S.-based automakers and the American operations of foreign-brand producers. It has been suggested that the impetus for the NHTSA's seeming preoccupation with market control rather than vehicular safety performance is a result of overt market protections such as tariffs and local-content laws having become politically unpopular due to the increasing popularity of free trade, thus driving the industry to adopt less visible forms of trade restrictions in the form of technical regulations different from those outside the United States.

An example of the market-control effects of the NHTSA's regulatory protocol is found in the agency's 1974 banning of the Citroën SM automobile, which some contemporary journalists describe as one of the safest vehicles available at the time. The NHTSA disapproved the SM's designs featuring steerable headlamps that were not of the sealed beam design that was then mandatory in the U.S. as well as its height adjustable suspension, which made compliance with the 1973 bumper requirements cost-prohibitive. The initial bumper regulations were intended to prevent functional damage to a vehicle's safety-related components such as lights and fuel system components when subjected to barrier crash tests at 5 miles per hour (8 km/h) at the front and 2.5 mph (4 km/h) at the rear. However, these regulations at low-speed collisions did not enhance occupant safety.

Vehicle manufacturers have acknowledged the functional equivalence of the UN and U.S. regulations, encouraged developing countries to recognize and accept both, and advocated for equal recognition of both systems in developed countries. However, some structural features of the U.S. legal system are incompatible with some aspects of the UN regulatory system. Studies have concluded that commonizing regulations between the US and the rest of the world (which uses U.N. Regulations) would save significant money, likely without affecting safety.

== Cost and cost-benefit ==
The NHTSA uses cost–benefit analysis for every safety device, system, or design feature mandated for installation on vehicles. No device, system, or design feature may be mandated unless it costs no more than a specified amount of money per life saved, or will save more money (in property damage, health care, etc.) than it costs. Requirements are balanced through estimated costs and estimated benefits. For example, FMVSS #208 effectively mandates the installation of frontal airbags in all new vehicles in the United States, for it is written such that no other technology can meet the stipulated requirements. It has been argued that even using conservative cost figures and optimistic benefit figures, airbags' cost–benefit ratio so extreme that it may fall outside of the cost–benefit requirements for mandatory safety devices. Cost–benefit requirements have been used as the basis for lighting-related regulation in the U.S; for example, while many countries in the world since at least the early 1970s have required rear turn signals to emit amber light so they might be distinguished from adjacent red brake lamps, U.S. regulations permit rear turn signals to emit either amber or red light. This has historically been justified on grounds of lower manufacturing cost and greater automaker styling freedom in the context of no demonstrated safety benefit to amber over red. NHTSA-sponsored research in 2011 has demonstrated that amber rear turn signals provide significantly better crash avoidance than red ones, and the NHTSA has found there is no significant cost penalty to amber signals versus red ones, yet the agency has not moved to require amber—instead proposing in 2015 to award extra NCAP points to passenger vehicles with amber rear turn signals. As of September 2022, however, the agency has not put this proposal into effect.

== Fuel economy ==
=== CAFE regulations ===
The NHTSA administers the Corporate Average Fuel Economy (CAFE), which is intended to incentivize the production of fuel-efficient vehicles by dint of fuel economy requirements measured against the sales-weighted harmonic average of each manufacturer's range of vehicles. Many governments outside North America promote fuel economy by heavily taxing motor fuel and/or by including a vehicle's weight, engine size, or fuel economy in calculating vehicle registration taxes (road tax).

== NCAP ==
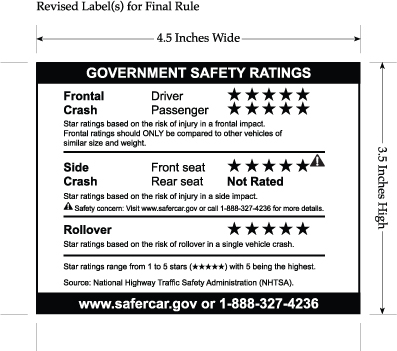
Consumer information label for a vehicle with NCAP rating

NHTSA front and side-impact tests of the 2006 Honda Ridgeline at 35 mph (56 km/h) and 38.5 mph (62 km/h), respectively

In 1979, the NHTSA created the New Car Assessment Program (NCAP) in response to Title II of the Motor Vehicle Information and Cost Savings Act of 1972, to encourage manufacturers to build safer vehicles and consumers to buy them. Since that time, the agency has improved the program by adding rating programs, facilitating access to test results, and revising the format of the information to make it easier for consumers to understand. NHTSA asserts the program has influenced manufacturers to build vehicles that consistently achieve high ratings.

The United States was the first country/region to have an NCAP program, which was then copied by other NCAP programs.

The first standardized 35 mph (56 km/h) front crash test was on May 21, 1979, and the first results were released on October 15 that year.

The agency established a frontal impact test protocol based on Federal Motor Vehicle Safety Standard 208 ("Occupant Crash Protection"), except that the frontal 4 NCAP test is conducted at 35 mph (56 km/h), rather than 30 mph (48 km/h) as required by FMVSS No. 208.

To improve the dissemination of NCAP ratings, and as a result of the Safe, Accountable, Flexible, Efficient Transportation Equity Act: A Legacy for Users (SAFETEA–LU), the agency has issued a Final Rule requiring manufacturers to place NCAP star ratings on the Monroney sticker (automobile price sticker). The rule had a September 1, 2007 compliance date.

== See also ==
- Insurance Institute for Highway Safety (IIHS)
- Intelligent Transportation Systems Institute (ITS)
- National Transportation Safety Board (NTSB)
- United Nations Economic Commission for Europe (UNECE)
