= Intelligent Transportation Systems Institute =

The Intelligent Transportation Systems (ITS) Institute is a national University Transportation Center headquartered at the University of Minnesota. The ITS Institute researches activities to enhance the safety and mobility of road-based and transit-based transportation, particularly in a northern climate and in rural environments. The ITS Institute focuses on human-centered technology, such as computing, sensing, communications, and control systems.

== History ==
The ITS Institute was established under section 6024 of the Intermodal Surface Transportation Efficiency Act (ISTEA) of 1991. It is currently funded through the federal Safe, Accountable, Flexible, Efficient Transportation Equity Act: A Legacy for Users (SAFETEA-LU) transportation bill.

== Faculty and staff ==
Max Donath is the director of the institute. The multi-disciplinary faculty and research staff represent engineering, public affairs, computer science, and the law school.

== Research activities ==
The ITS Institute publishes many research reports each year. Some recent topics were distracted driving, teen drivers, bus rapid transit, and driver assistive technologies. The ITS Institute uses several labs and facilities to conduct research, including the Intelligent Vehicles Laboratory, the Minnesota Traffic Observatory, the Northland Advanced Transportation Systems Research Laboratories, and the HumanFIRST program. Research partners include the Research and Technology Innovation Administration (RITA), Federal Highway Administration (FHWA), Minnesota Department of Transportation, and Minnesota Local Road Research Board.

== Education activities ==
The ITS Institute organizes the Advanced Transportation Technologies seminar series and co-sponsors an annual Transportation Career Expo, held at the University of Minnesota. It also offers programs, events, and Web-based tools for K-12 students.
