= Joseph R. Callahan =

American farmer, businessman, and politician (1892–1977)

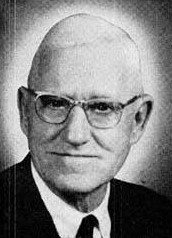

Member of the Illinois House of Representatives
- In office 1965–1967
- Preceded by: At-large district created
- Succeeded by: At-large district abolished

Personal details
- Born: Joseph Raymond Callahan; May 30, 1892 Milford, Illinois, U.S.
- Died: July 31, 1977 (aged 85) Watseka, Illinois, U.S.
- Party: Democratic
- Spouse: Helen
- Relatives: Cheri Bustos (granddaughter); Colleen Callahan (granddaughter)

Military service
- Allegiance: United States
- Branch/service: United States Army
- Battles/wars: World War I

Joseph Raymond Callahan (May 30, 1892 – July 31, 1977) was an American farmer, businessman, and politician.

== Biography ==
Callahan was born on a farm near Milford, Illinois in Iroquois County, Illinois. He graduated from the Mitford Township High School in 1912 and served in the United States Army during World War I. Callahan was a farmer; he also raised cattle and hogs. He served as president of the Illinois Farmers Union.

Callahan was involved with the Democratic Party and served as the Chairman of the Iroquois County Democrats for twenty years. In the 1948 Democratic primary, Callahan nearly lost his position with the county party as a precinct committeeman after allowing a black family to hunt on his land.

Due to partisan gridlock during the 1961 decennial redistricting, the Illinois Supreme Court ordered an at-large election for all 177 members of the Illinois House in 1964. Voters were given ballots three feet long. Callahan was one of the 177 members elected in the subsequent statewide election. He served in the Illinois House of Representatives from 1965 to 1967. During his term he served was assigned to the Committee on Agriculture; the Committee on Industry and Labor; and the Committee on Public Utilities, Railroads & Aviation. John P. Touhy, as Speaker of the Illinois House of Representatives, appointed Callahan to the Water Resource Management Commission. In 1965, a map was drawn which placed Callahan and longtime Democratic incumbent Joe W. Russell of Piper City. The 42nd district included all of Kankakee, Iroquois, Ford, and Grundy counties as well as southwestern Will County. Callahan did not run in the 1966 general election. Republicans James R. Washburn and Thomas R. Houde, and Democrat Joe W. Russell won the 42nd district's three seats.

Callahan died at the Iroquois Memorial Hospital in Watseka, Illinois.

== Family ==
One of his sons, Gene Callhan, was a political staffer to several Illinois Democrats before becoming a lobbyist for Major League Baseball. Callahan's granddaughter Cheri Bustos served in the United States House of Representatives. Another granddaughter Colleen Callahan is the Director of the Illinois Department of Natural Resources.
