= Colleen Callahan =

American journalist

Colleen Callahan Burns
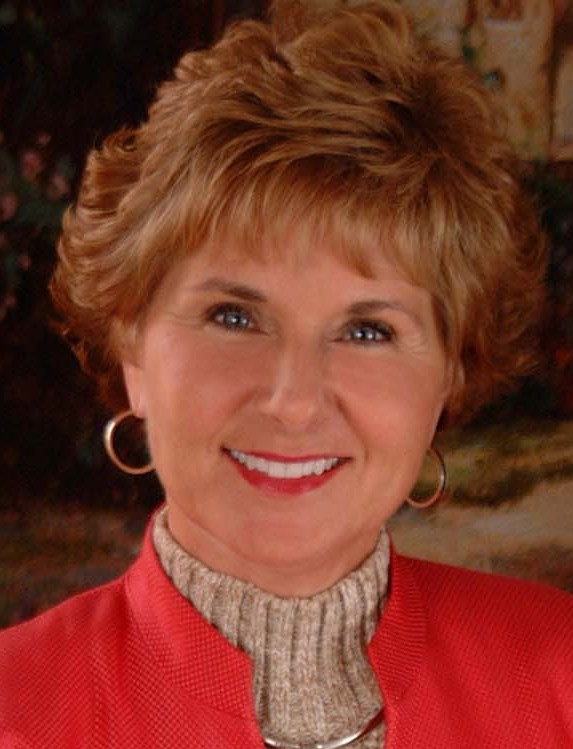
- USDA photo, 2009

Director of the Illinois Department of Natural Resources
- In office March 1, 2019 – January 16, 2023
- Governor: J. B. Pritzker
- Preceded by: Wayne Rosenthal
- Succeeded by: Natalie Phelps Finnie

Personal details
- Party: Democratic
- Spouse: Dick Burns
- Children: 1
- Relatives: Joe Callahan (grandfather); Cheri Bustos (cousin)
- Education: University of Illinois
- Occupation: News reporter

Colleen Callahan Burns is an agribusiness news reporter and Director of the Illinois Department of Natural Resources. She was the Democratic nominee for Illinois's 18th congressional district in 2008.

== Family ==
Callahan grew up on a farm near Milford, Illinois and graduated as salutatorian from Milford Township High School in May 1969.

Her family has long been active in politics in downstate Illinois. Her father, Francis Callahan, was chair of the Iroquois County Democrats. Her grandfather, Joseph R. Callahan, was in the Illinois House of Representatives. Her uncle, Gene Callahan, was the administrative assistant and press secretary for Lieutenant Governor Paul Simon (before Simon became a United States senator) and chief of staff for U.S. Senator Alan Dixon; his daughter, Cheri Bustos was the U.S. representative for the neighboring Illinois's 17th congressional district until 2023.

Callahan and her husband Dick Burns live on a farm near Kickapoo, Illinois, between Brimfield, Illinois and Peoria, where they raise purebred Angus cattle. They have a grown daughter who became a practicing attorney in Chicago.

== Career ==
After graduating from the University of Illinois at Urbana-Champaign in 1973, she moved to Peoria to work for WMBD (AM) until 2005. She was agribusiness reporter for WMBD-TV and WCIA from 1974 to 1997.

In 2003, she went on a study trip to Afghanistan and Iraq, paid for at her own expense, at the invitation of the U.S. Secretary of Agriculture. She started her own business, Colleen Callahan Communications, in 2003. At the beginning of 2003, she changed employers from WMBD in Peoria to WGFA in Watseka, Illinois; she has been agribusiness director at both stations.

In 2008, she ran for U.S. Representative for Illinois's 18th congressional district, a seat open by the retirement of Ray LaHood. She won the Democratic nomination, but lost the November 4 general election to Republican Aaron Schock, 59% to 38%, with 3% going to Sheldon Schafer.

On 13 June 2009, Callahan began work as United States Department of Agriculture Illinois State Director of Rural Development.

In 2017, Colleen Callahan was named by J. B. Pritzker the co-chair of the latter's Agriculture Transition Committee. Once Pritzker had become governor, Callahan became Director of the Illinois Department of Natural Resources on March 1, 2019. Callahan stepped down as department director on January 16, 2023, and was succeeded by former state legislator and IDNR's deputy director Natalie Phelps Finnie.

== Civic participation ==
Callahan has served on the boards of many local organizations, including:

- Peoria YWCA
- Nature Conservancy Great Rivers Regional Board
- Youth for a Cause
- The Children's Home in Peoria
- University of Illinois ACES Alumni Association (President)
- Morton Community Bank

She has also served as a member of the St. Francis Medical Center Women's Health Services Public Relations Committee, and is a member of the National Association of Women Business Owners. She has been heavily involved in the National Association of Farm Broadcasters (NAFB), was its first female president, and was chairman of the NAFB Ethics Committee.

She has also been active in local Catholic schools, serving on the education board at St. Mary's grade school in Kickapoo and assisting Peoria Notre Dame High School.

== See also ==
- United States House of Representatives elections in Illinois, 2008
- Illinois's 18th congressional district
