= 2008 United States House of Representatives elections in Illinois =

- November 4, 2008

All 19 Illinois seats to the United States House of Representatives
	Majority party	Minority party
Party	Democratic	Republican
Last election	10	9
Seats before	11	8
Seats won	12	7
Seat change	▲1	▼1
Popular vote	3,176,203	1,961,173
Percentage	60.52%	37.37%
Swing	▲2.99%	▼4.41%

Democratic
50–60%
60–70%
70–80%
80–90%
90–100%
Republican
50–60%
60–70%
70–80%
80–90%

The 2008 congressional elections in Illinois were held on November 4, 2008, to determine who would represent the State of Illinois in the United States House of Representatives, coinciding with the presidential and U.S. Senate elections. Representatives are elected for two-year terms; those elected served in the 111th Congress from January 3, 2009, until January 3, 2011.

Illinois had nineteen seats in the House, apportioned according to the 2000 United States census. Its 2007–2008 congressional delegation consisted of eleven Democrats and eight Republicans. It became, following the election, twelve Democrats and seven Republicans. District 11 was the only seat which changed party (from open Republican to Democratic), although CQ Politics had forecast districts 6, 8, 10, 11, 13, 14 and 18 to be at some risk for the incumbent party.

== Statewide ==
=== By district ===
Results of the 2008 United States House of Representatives elections in Illinois by district:

District	Democratic		Republican		Others		Total		Result
District	Votes	%	Votes	%	Votes	%	Votes	%	Result
District 1	233,036	85.87%	38,361	14.13%	0	0.00%	271,397	100.0%	Democratic hold
District 2	251,052	89.41%	29,721	10.59%	3	0.00%	280,776	100.0%	Democratic hold
District 3	172,581	73.28%	50,336	21.37%	12,607	5.35%	235,524	100.0%	Democratic hold
District 4	112,529	80.60%	16,024	11.48%	11,053	7.92%	139,606	100.0%	Democratic hold
District 5	170,728	73.94%	50,881	22.04%	9,283	4.02%	230,892	100.0%	Democratic hold
District 6	109,007	42.43%	147,906	57.57%	0	0.00%	256,913	100.0%	Republican hold
District 7	235,343	85.02%	41,474	14.98%	0	0.00%	276,817	100.0%	Democratic hold
District 8	179,444	60.72%	116,081	39.28%	0	0.00%	295,525	100.0%	Democratic hold
District 9	181,948	74.66%	53,593	21.99%	8,153	3.35%	243,694	100.0%	Democratic hold
District 10	138,176	47.44%	153,082	52.56%	0	0.00%	291,258	100.0%	Republican hold
District 10	185,652	58.40%	109,608	34.48%	22,635	7.12%	317,895	100.0%	Democratic gain
District 12	212,891	71.40%	74,382	24.95%	10,908	3.67%	298,181	100.0%	Democratic hold
District 13	147,430	43.65%	180,888	53.55%	9,453	2.80%	337,771	100.0%	Republican hold
District 14	185,404	57.75%	135,653	42.25%	0	0.00%	321,057	100.0%	Democratic hold
District 15	104,393	35.81%	187,121	64.19%	0	0.00%	291,514	100.0%	Republican hold
District 16	112,648	36.08%	190,039	60.87%	9,533	3.05%	312,220	100.0%	Republican hold
District 17	220,961	99.77%	0	0.00%	517	0.23%	221,478	100.0%	Democratic hold
District 18	117,642	37.94%	182,589	58.88%	9,857	3.18%	310,088	100.0%	Republican hold
District 19	105,338	33.38%	203,434	64.46%	6,817	2.16%	315,589	100.0%	Republican hold
Total	3,176,203	60.52%	1,961,173	37.37%	110,819	2.11%	5,248,195	100.0%	

== District 1 ==
2008 Illinois's 1st congressional district election
- November 4, 2008
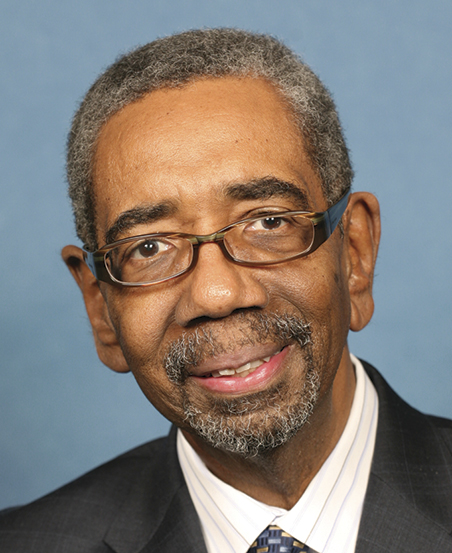

Nominee	Bobby Rush	Antoine Members
Party	Democratic	Republican
Popular vote	233,036	38,361
Percentage	85.87%	14.13%
- County results Rush: 80–90%
U.S. Representative before election
Bobby Rush
Democratic
Elected U.S. Representative
Bobby Rush
Democratic

This district includes part of Cook County. Democratic incumbent Bobby Rush, who has held the seat since 1993, ran against Republican nominee Antoine Members.

=== Predictions ===
Source	Ranking	As of
The Cook Political Report	Safe D	November 6, 2008
Rothenberg	Safe D	November 2, 2008
Sabato's Crystal Ball	Safe D	November 6, 2008
Real Clear Politics	Safe D	November 7, 2008
CQ Politics	Safe D	November 6, 2008

Illinois's 1st congressional district election, 2008
Party	Candidate	Votes	%
Democratic	Bobby Rush (incumbent)	233,036	85.87
Republican	Antoine Members	38,361	14.13
Total votes		271,397	100.00
Democratic hold			

== District 2 ==
2008 Illinois's 2nd congressional district election
- November 4, 2008
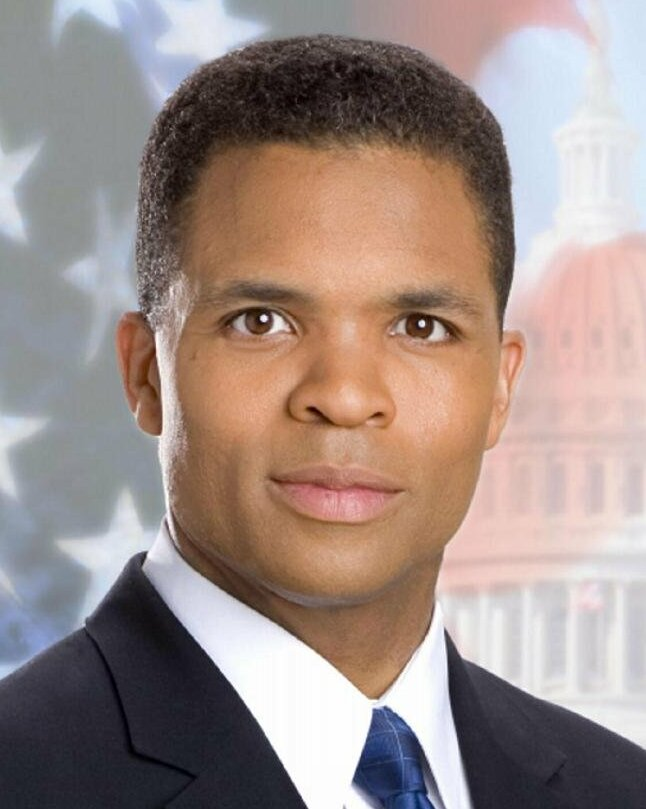

Nominee	Jesse Jackson Jr.	Anthony Williams
Party	Democratic	Republican
Popular vote	251,052	29,721
Percentage	89.41%	10.59%
- County results Jackson: 80–90%
U.S. Representative before election
Jesse Jackson Jr.
Democratic
Elected U.S. Representative
Jesse Jackson Jr.
Democratic

This district includes parts of Cook County and Will County. Democratic nominee Jesse Jackson, Jr., who has held the seat winning a special election in December 1995, ran against Republican nominee Anthony Williams.

=== Predictions ===
Source	Ranking	As of
The Cook Political Report	Safe D	November 6, 2008
Rothenberg	Safe D	November 2, 2008
Sabato's Crystal Ball	Safe D	November 6, 2008
Real Clear Politics	Safe D	November 7, 2008
CQ Politics	Safe D	November 6, 2008

Illinois's 2nd congressional district election, 2008
Party	Candidate	Votes	%
Democratic	Jesse Jackson, Jr. (incumbent)	251,052	89.41
Republican	Anthony Williams	29,721	10.59
Write-ins		3	0.00
Total votes		280,776	100.00
Democratic hold			

== District 3 ==
2008 Illinois's 3rd congressional district election
- November 4, 2008
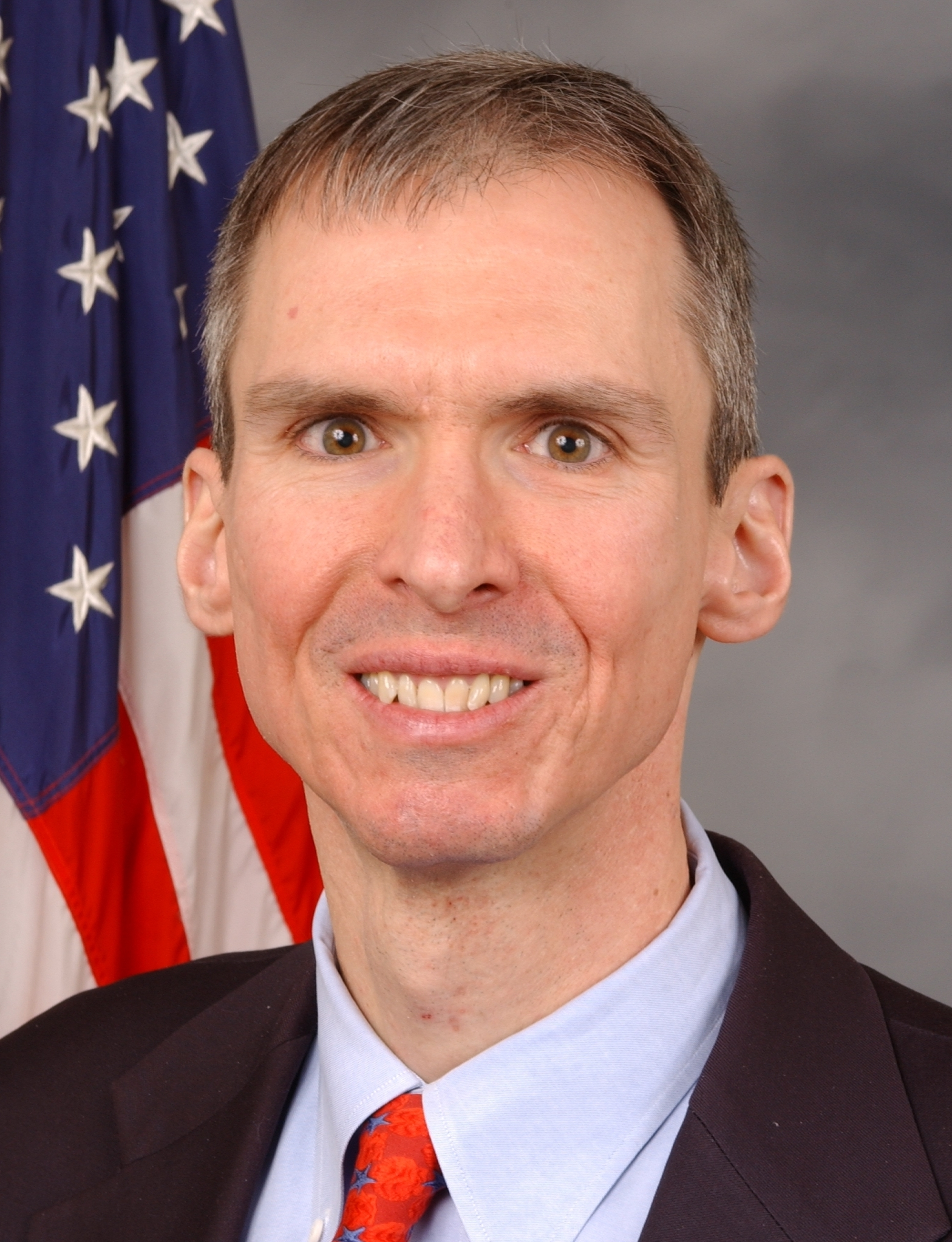

Nominee	Dan Lipinski	Michael Hawkins	Jerome Pohlen
Party	Democratic	Republican	Green
Popular vote	172,581	50,336	12,607
Percentage	73.28%	21.37%	5.35%
- County results Lipinski: 70–80%
U.S. Representative before election
Dan Lipinski
Democratic
Elected U.S. Representative
Dan Lipinski
Democratic

This district includes part of Cook County. Democratic incumbent Dan Lipinski, who has held the seat since 2005, ran against Republican nominee Michael Hawkins and Green Party nominee Jerome Pohlen. Perennial candidate and alleged white supremacist Richard Mayers had attempted to run in the Green Party primary.

=== Predictions ===
Source	Ranking	As of
The Cook Political Report	Safe D	November 6, 2008
Rothenberg	Safe D	November 2, 2008
Sabato's Crystal Ball	Safe D	November 6, 2008
Real Clear Politics	Safe D	November 7, 2008
CQ Politics	Safe D	November 6, 2008

Illinois's 3rd congressional district election, 2008
Party	Candidate	Votes	%
Democratic	Dan Lipinski (incumbent)	172,581	73.28
Republican	Michael Hawkins	50,336	21.37
Green	Jerome Pohlen	12,607	5.35
Total votes		235,524	100.00
Democratic hold			

== District 4 ==
2008 Illinois's 4th congressional district election
- November 4, 2008
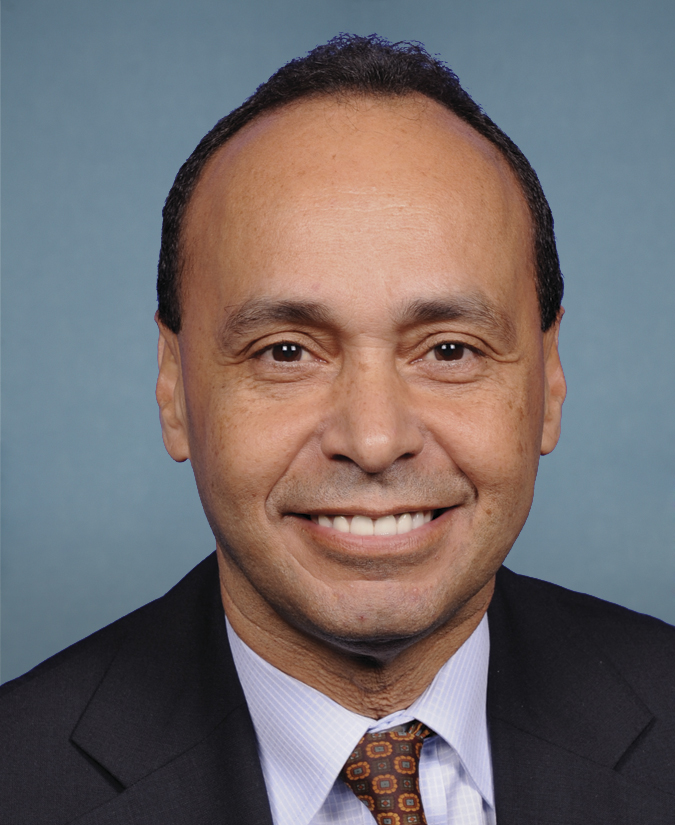

Nominee	Luis Gutiérrez	Daniel Cunningham	Omar López
Party	Democratic	Republican	Green
Popular vote	112,529	16,024	11,053
Percentage	80.60%	11.48%	7.92%
- County results Gutierrez: 80–90%
U.S. Representative before election
Luis Gutiérrez
Democratic
Elected U.S. Representative
Luis Gutiérrez
Democratic

This district includes part of Cook County. Democratic incumbent Luis Gutierrez, who has held the seat since January 1993, ran against Republican nominee Daniel Cunninghan and Green Party nominee Omar López.

Earlier in 2007, Cook County Commissioner Roberto Maldonado and Chicago aldermen Manny Flores, Ricardo Muñoz and George Cardenas had announced their intentions to run for the seat in 2008, as Gutierrez had said he planned to retire. However, Gutierrez later changed his mind and announced he would seek re-election in 2008.

=== Predictions ===
Source	Ranking	As of
The Cook Political Report	Safe D	November 6, 2008
Rothenberg	Safe D	November 2, 2008
Sabato's Crystal Ball	Safe D	November 6, 2008
Real Clear Politics	Safe D	November 7, 2008
CQ Politics	Safe D	November 6, 2008

Illinois's 4th congressional district election, 2008
Party	Candidate	Votes	%
Democratic	Luis Gutierrez (incumbent)	112,529	80.60
Republican	Daniel Cunninghan	16,024	11.48
Green	Omar N. López	11,053	7.92
Total votes		139,606	100.00
Democratic hold			

== District 5 ==
2008 Illinois's 5th congressional district election
- November 4, 2008
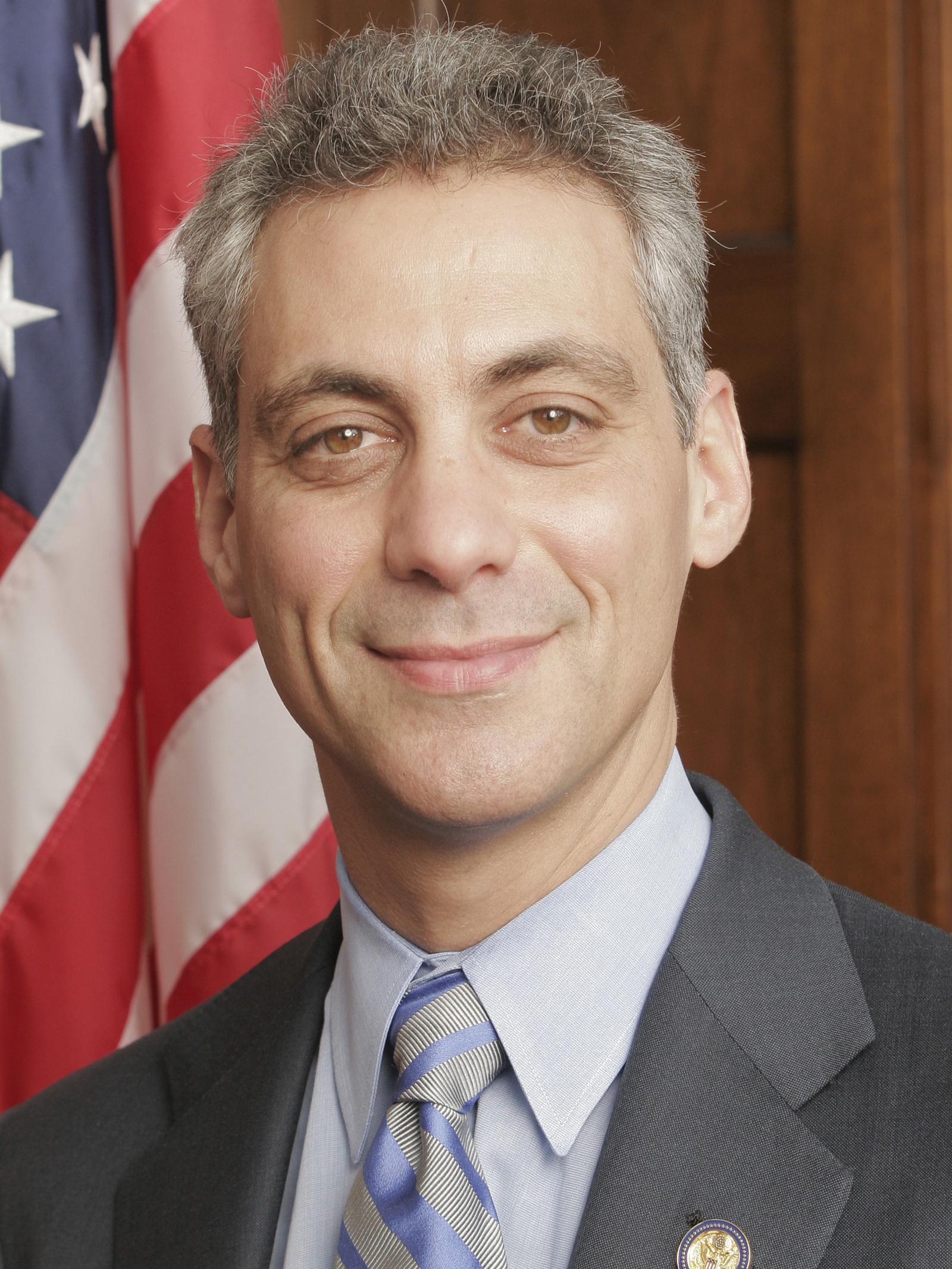

Nominee	Rahm Emanuel	Tom Hanson
Party	Democratic	Republican
Popular vote	170,728	50,881
Percentage	73.94%	22.04%
- County results Emanuel: 70–80%
U.S. Representative before election
Rahm Emanuel
Democratic
Elected U.S. Representative
Rahm Emanuel
Democratic

This district includes part of Cook County. Democratic incumbent Rahm Emanuel, who has held the seat since 2003, ran against Republican nominee Tom Hanson and Green Party nominee Alan Augustson.

Although Emanuel won re-election, he resigned from the congress on January 2, 2009, on the eve of the 111th Congress after being nominated to become White House Chief of Staff under Barack Obama. A special election was held on April 7, 2009, to replace Emanuel.

=== Predictions ===
Source	Ranking	As of
The Cook Political Report	Safe D	November 6, 2008
Rothenberg	Safe D	November 2, 2008
Sabato's Crystal Ball	Safe D	November 6, 2008
Real Clear Politics	Safe D	November 7, 2008
CQ Politics	Safe D	November 6, 2008

Illinois's 5th congressional district election, 2008
Party	Candidate	Votes	%
Democratic	Rahm Emanuel (incumbent)	170,728	73.94
Republican	Tom Hanson	50,881	22.04
Green	Alan Augustson	9,283	4.02
Total votes		230,892	100.00
Democratic hold			

== District 6 ==
2008 Illinois's 6th congressional district election
- November 4, 2008
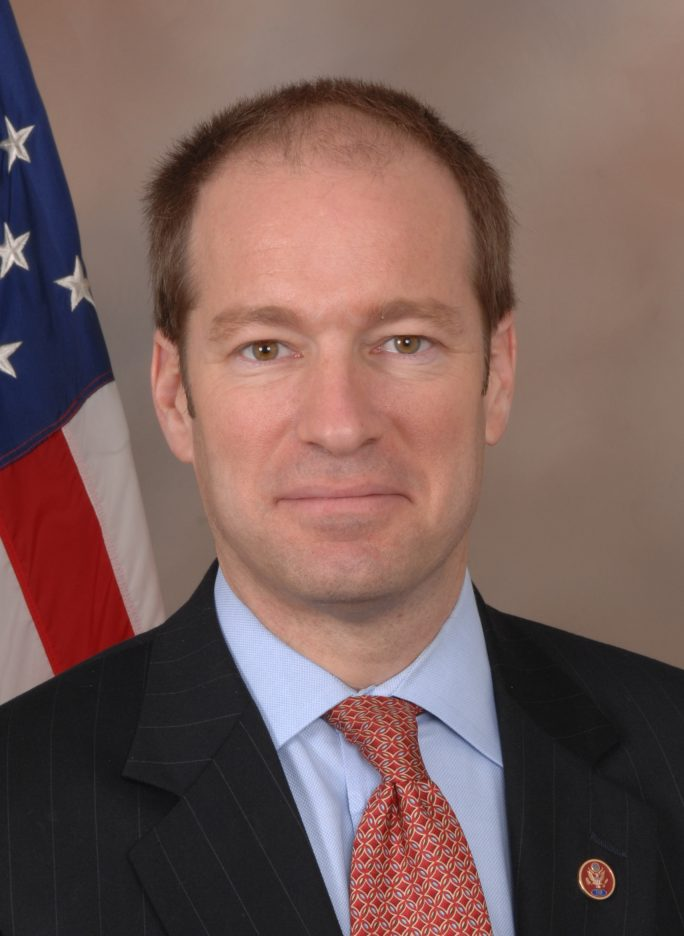

Nominee	Peter Roskam	Jill Morgenthaler
Party	Republican	Democratic
Popular vote	147,906	109,007
Percentage	57.57%	42.43%
- County results Roskam: 50–60%
U.S. Representative before election
Peter Roskam
Republican
Elected U.S. Representative
Peter Roskam
Republican

This district includes parts of DuPage County and Cook County. Freshman Republican incumbent Peter Roskam, who won the then-open seat in a close election in 2006, ran against Democratic nominee Jill Morgenthaler, an Iraq War veteran.

=== Predictions ===
Source	Ranking	As of
The Cook Political Report	Safe R	November 6, 2008
Rothenberg	Safe R	November 2, 2008
Sabato's Crystal Ball	Safe R	November 6, 2008
Real Clear Politics	Safe R	November 7, 2008
CQ Politics	Likely R	November 6, 2008

Illinois's 6th congressional district election, 2008
Party	Candidate	Votes	%
Republican	Peter Roskam (incumbent)	147,906	57.57
Democratic	Jill Morgenthaler	109,007	42.43
Total votes		256,913	100.00
Republican hold			

== District 7 ==
2008 Illinois's 7th congressional district election
- November 4, 2008
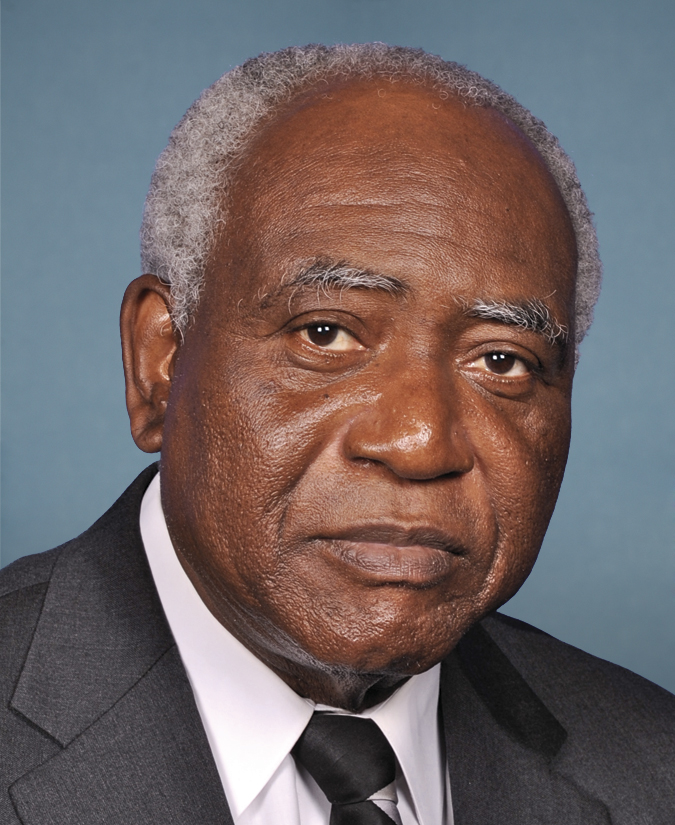

Nominee	Danny Davis	Steve Miller
Party	Democratic	Republican
Popular vote	235,343	41,474
Percentage	85.02%	14.98%
- County results Davis: 80–90%
U.S. Representative before election
Danny Davis
Democratic
Elected U.S. Representative
Danny Davis
Democratic

This district lies entirely within Cook County. Democratic incumbent Danny K. Davis, who has held the seat since 1997, ran against Republican nominee Steve Miller, a United States Navy veteran.

=== Predictions ===
Source	Ranking	As of
The Cook Political Report	Safe D	November 6, 2008
Rothenberg	Safe D	November 2, 2008
Sabato's Crystal Ball	Safe D	November 6, 2008
Real Clear Politics	Safe D	November 7, 2008
CQ Politics	Safe D	November 6, 2008

Illinois's 7th congressional district election, 2008
Party	Candidate	Votes	%
Democratic	Danny K. Davis (incumbent)	235,343	85.02
Republican	Steve Miller	41,474	14.98
Total votes		276,817	100.00
Democratic hold			

== District 8 ==
2008 Illinois's 8th congressional district election
- November 4, 2008
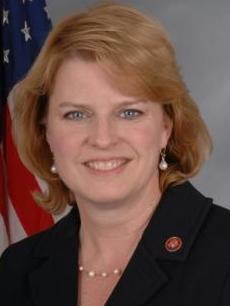

Nominee	Melissa Bean	Steve Greenberg
Party	Democratic	Republican
Popular vote	179,444	116,081
Percentage	60.72%	39.28%
- County results Bean: 50–60% 60–70%
U.S. Representative before election
Melissa Bean
Democratic
Elected U.S. Representative
Melissa Bean
Democratic

This district includes parts of Lake County, McHenry County and Cook County. Democratic incumbent Melissa Bean, who has held the seat since 2005, ran against Republican nominee Steve Greenberg.

=== Predictions ===
Source	Ranking	As of
The Cook Political Report	Safe D	November 6, 2008
Rothenberg	Safe D	November 2, 2008
Sabato's Crystal Ball	Lean D	November 6, 2008
Real Clear Politics	Safe D	November 7, 2008
CQ Politics	Likely D	November 6, 2008

Illinois's 8th congressional district election, 2008
Party	Candidate	Votes	%
Democratic	Melissa Bean (incumbent)	179,444	60.72
Republican	Steve Greenberg	116,081	39.28
Total votes		295,525	100.00
Democratic hold			

== District 9 ==
2008 Illinois's 9th congressional district election
- November 4, 2008
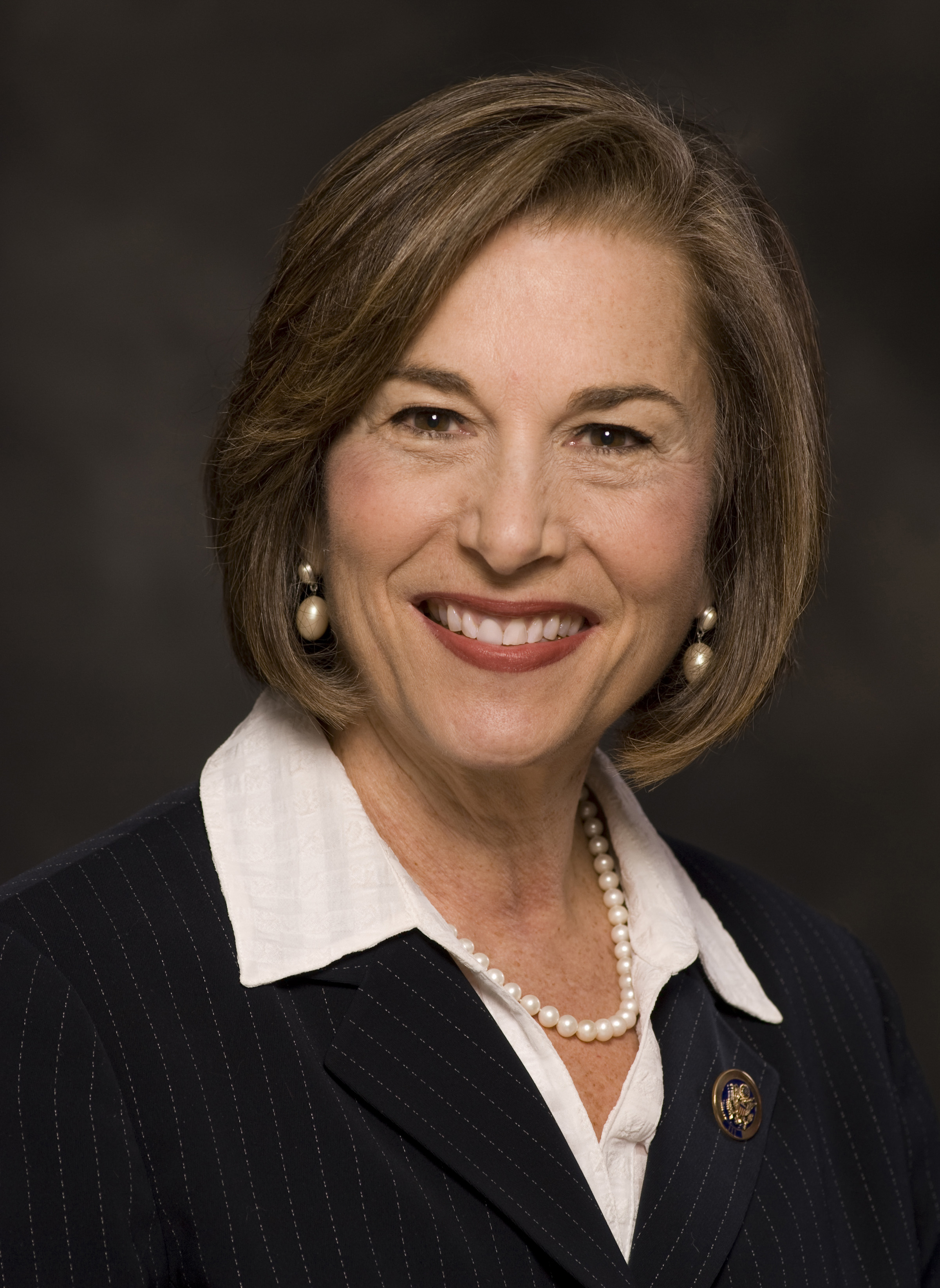

Nominee	Jan Schakowsky	Michael Younan
Party	Democratic	Republican
Popular vote	181,948	53,593
Percentage	74.66%	21.99%
- County results Schakowsky: 70–80%
U.S. Representative before election
Jan Schakowsky
Democratic
Elected U.S. Representative
Jan Schakowsky
Democratic

This district includes all of Evanston, Skokie, Niles, Morton Grove, Park Ridge and Norridge, parts of Wilmette, Northfield, Glenview, Golf, Rosemont and Des Plaines, as well as much of the North Side of Chicago. Democratic incumbent Jan Schakowsky, who has held the seat since 1999, ran against Republican nominee Michael B. Younan and Green Party nominee Morris Shanfield.

=== Predictions ===
Source	Ranking	As of
The Cook Political Report	Safe D	November 6, 2008
Rothenberg	Safe D	November 2, 2008
Sabato's Crystal Ball	Safe D	November 6, 2008
Real Clear Politics	Safe D	November 7, 2008
CQ Politics	Safe D	November 6, 2008

Illinois's 9th congressional district election, 2008
Party	Candidate	Votes	%
Democratic	Jan Schakowsky (incumbent)	181,948	74.66
Republican	Michael B. Younan	53,593	21.99
Green	Morris Shanfield	8,140	3.34
Write-ins		13	0.01
Total votes		243,694	100.00
Democratic hold			

== District 10 ==
2008 Illinois's 10th congressional district election
- November 4, 2008
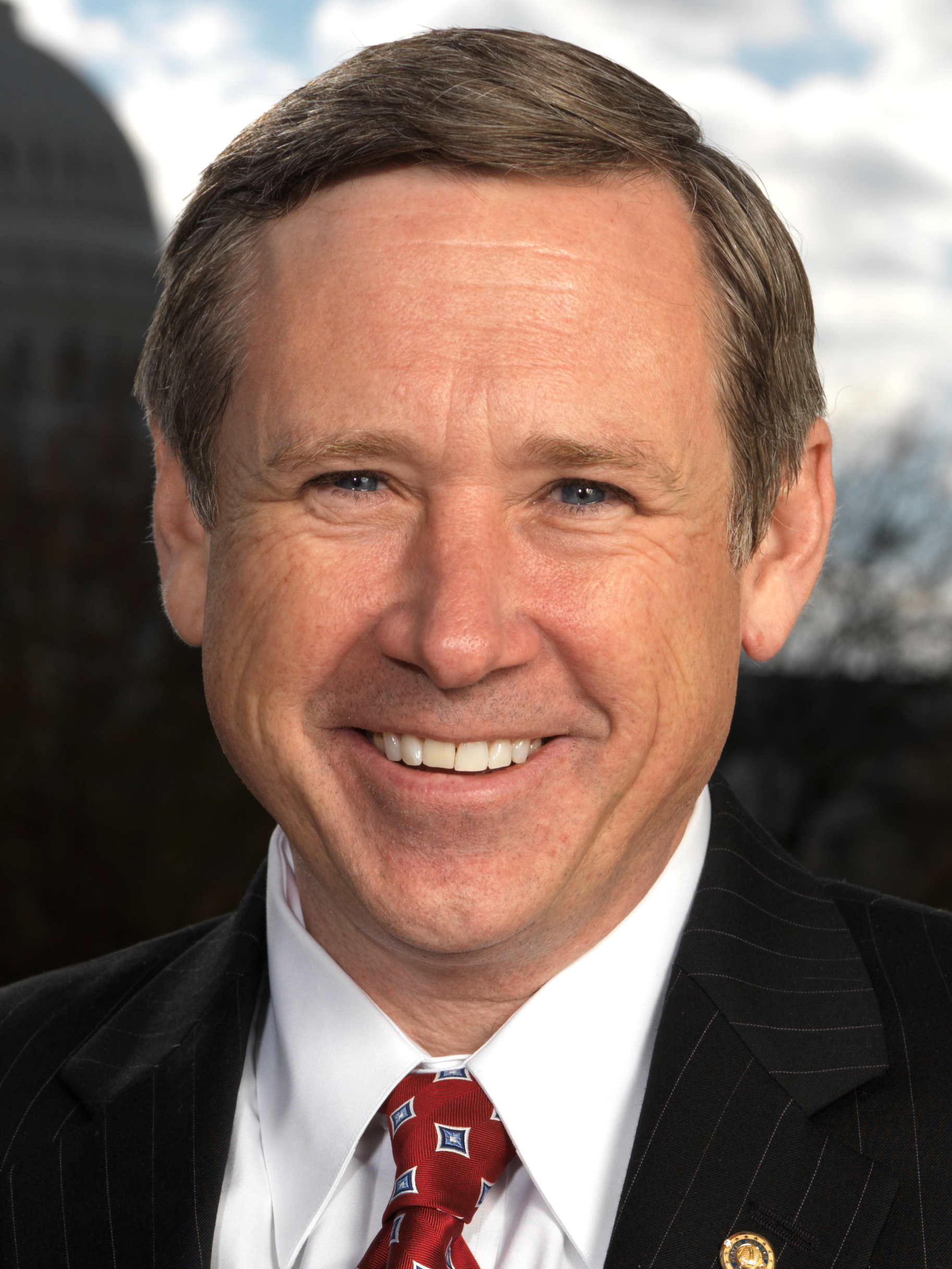

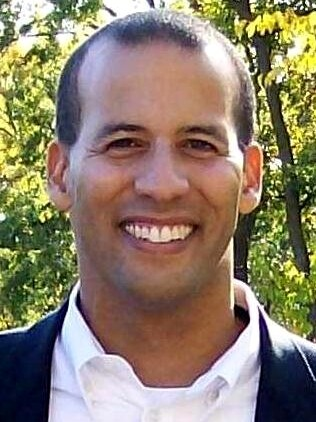
Nominee	Mark Kirk	Dan Seals
Party	Republican	Democratic
Popular vote	153,082	138,176
Percentage	52.56%	47.44%
- County results Kirk: 50–60% Seals: 50–60%
U.S. Representative before election
Mark Kirk
Republican
Elected U.S. Representative
Mark Kirk
Republican

This district includes parts of Lake County and Cook County. Republican incumbent Mark Kirk, who has held the seat since 2001, ran against Democratic nominee Dan Seals, who also ran against Kirk in the 2006 election.

=== Predictions ===
Source	Ranking	As of
The Cook Political Report	Tossup	November 6, 2008
Rothenberg	Tilt R	November 2, 2008
Sabato's Crystal Ball	Lean D (flip)	November 6, 2008
Real Clear Politics	Tossup	November 7, 2008
CQ Politics	Tossup	November 6, 2008

Illinois's 10th congressional district election, 2008
Party	Candidate	Votes	%
Republican	Mark Kirk (incumbent)	153,082	52.56
Democratic	Dan Seals	138,176	47.44
Total votes		291,258	100.00
Republican hold			

== District 11 ==
2008 Illinois's 11th congressional district election
- November 4, 2008
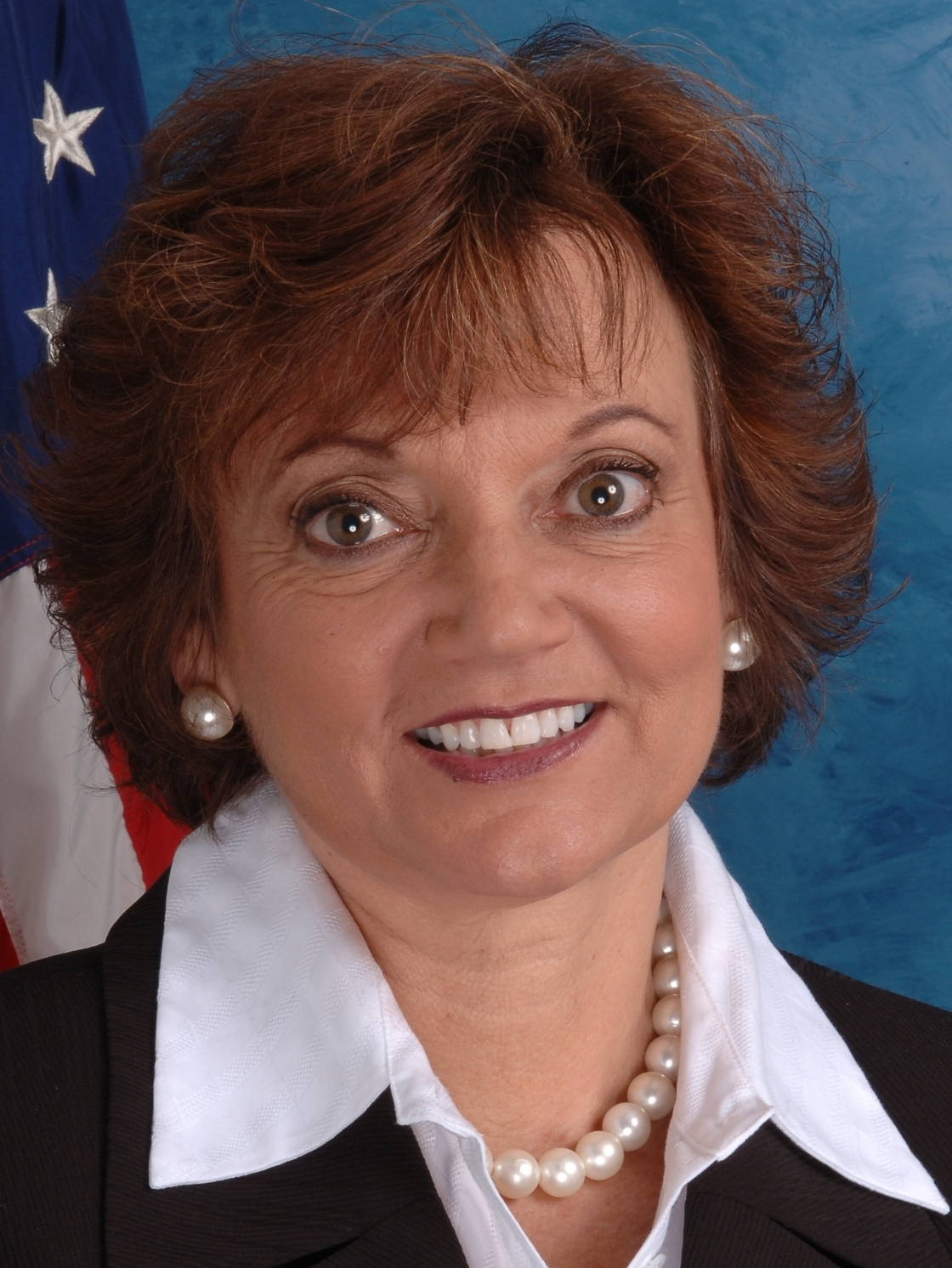

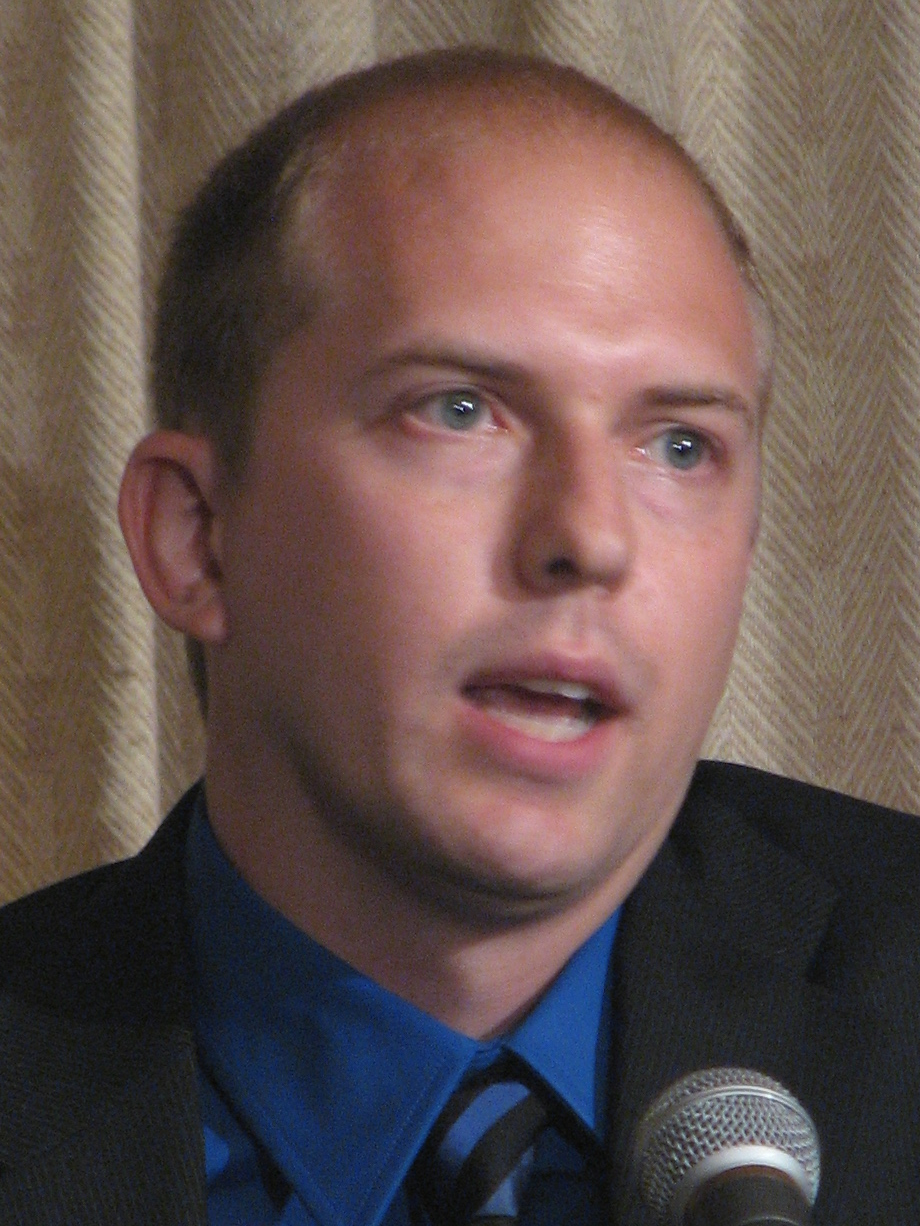
Nominee	Debbie Halvorson	Marty Ozinga	Jason Wallace
Party	Democratic	Republican	Green
Popular vote	185,652	109,608	22,635
Percentage	58.40%	34.48%	7.12%
- County results Halvorson: 40–50% 50–60% 60–70%
U.S. Representative before election
Jerry Weller
Republican
Elected U.S. Representative
Debbie Halvorson
Democratic

This district includes the towns of Joliet, Kankakee, LaSalle, Ottawa and Streator, as well as all or parts of Will County, Kankakee County, Grundy County, LaSalle County, Bureau County, Woodford County and McLean County. An open seat, Democratic State Senate Majority Leader Debbie Halvorson ran against Republican nominee Marty Ozinga (a local businessman) and Green Party nominee Jason Wallace.

Republican incumbent Jerry Weller, who had held the seat since 1995, decided not to seek re-election, leaving this an open seat. Tim Baldermann, mayor of New Lenox and police chief of Chicago Ridge, won the Republican nomination but withdrew on February 23. Martin Ozinga was chosen to replace Baldermann on April 30.

=== Predictions ===
Source	Ranking	As of
The Cook Political Report	Lean D (flip)	November 6, 2008
Rothenberg	Lean D (flip)	November 2, 2008
Sabato's Crystal Ball	Lean D (flip)	November 6, 2008
Real Clear Politics	Lean D (flip)	November 7, 2008
CQ Politics	Lean D (flip)	November 6, 2008

Illinois's 11th congressional district election, 2008
Party	Candidate	Votes	%
Democratic	Debbie Halvorson	185,652	58.40
Republican	Marty Ozinga	109,608	34.48
Green	Jason Wallace	22,635	7.12
Total votes		317,895	100.00
Democratic gain from Republican			

== District 12 ==
2008 Illinois's 12th congressional district election
- November 4, 2008
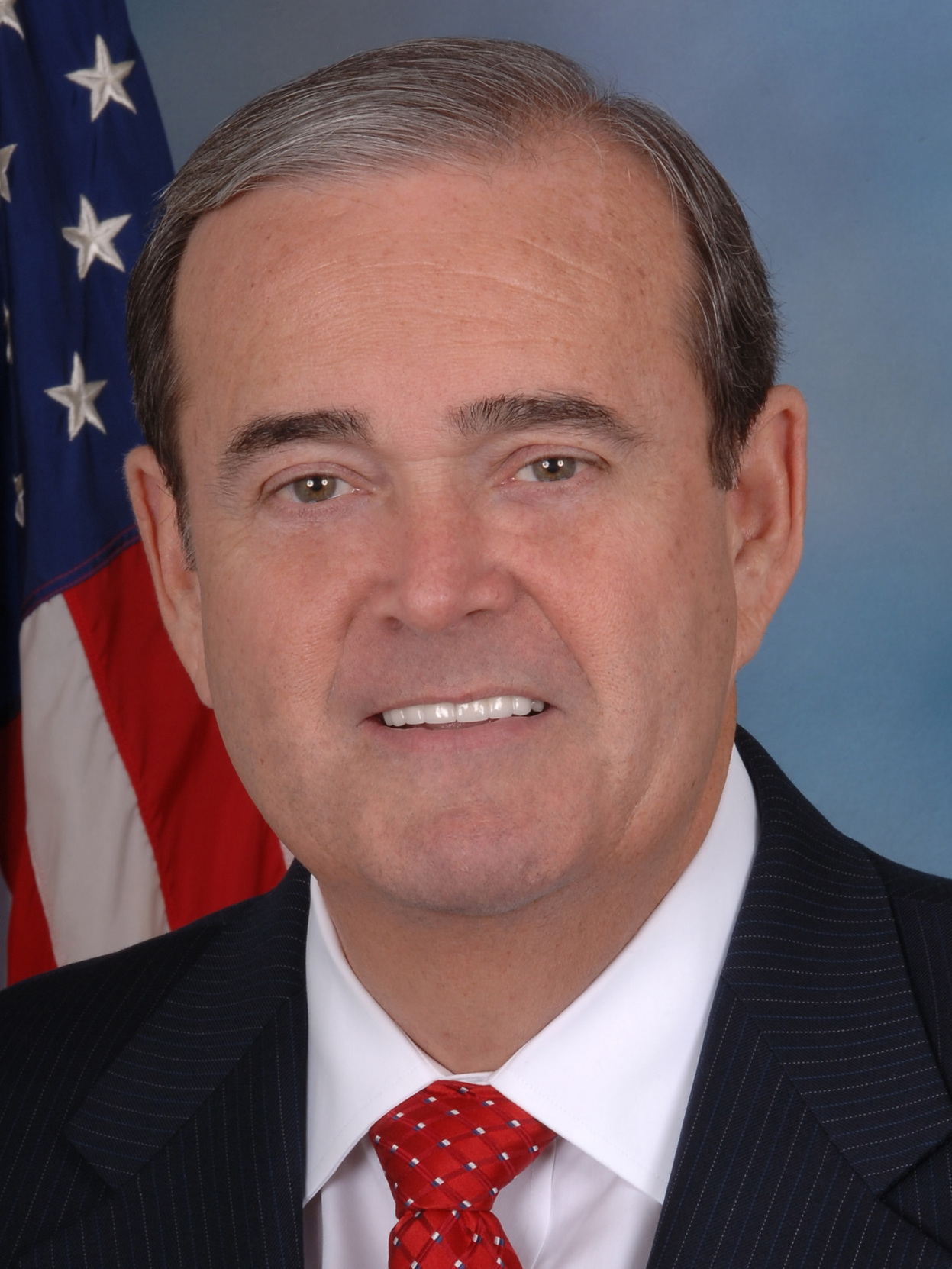

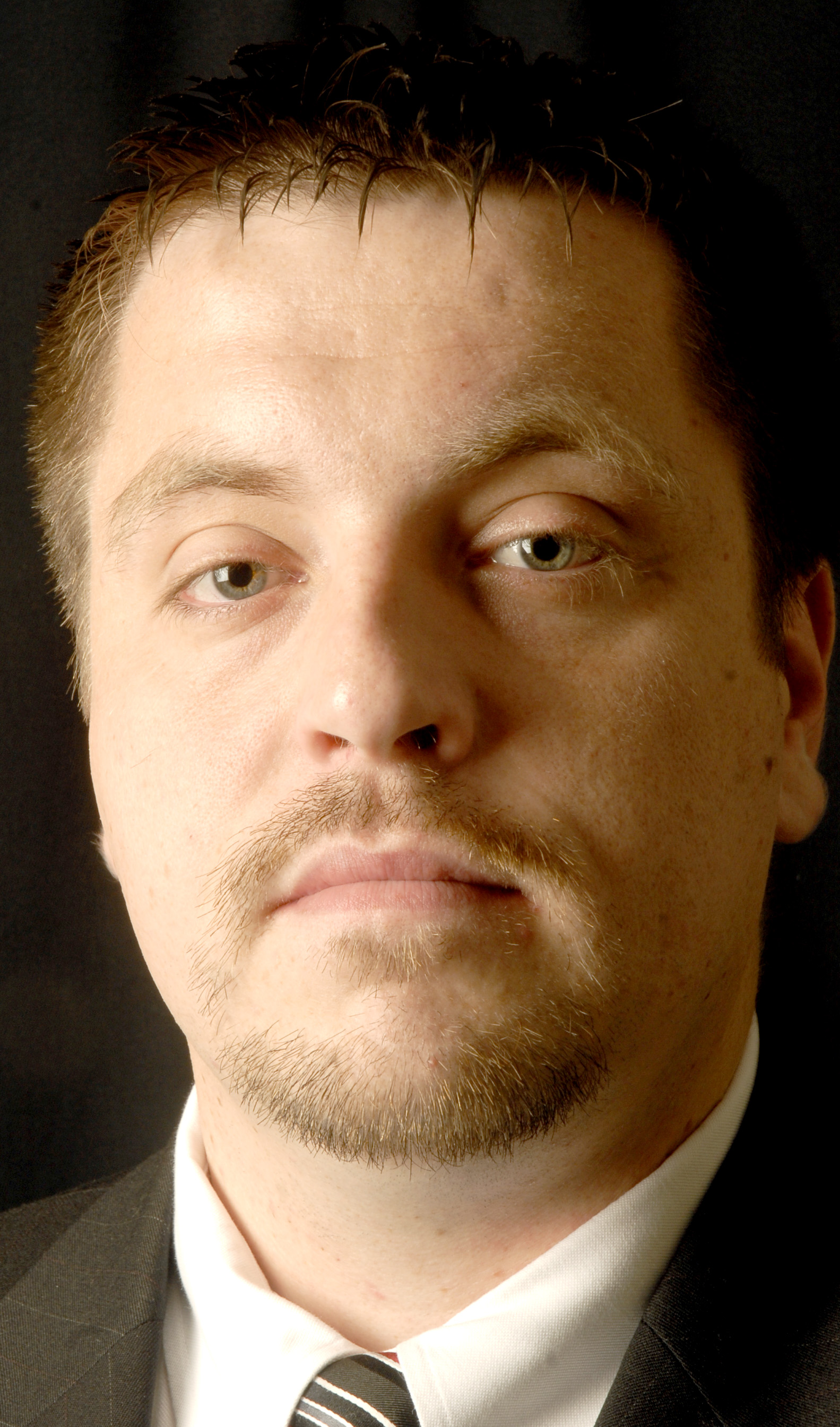
Nominee	Jerry Costello	Tim Richardson
Party	Democratic	Republican
Popular vote	212,891	74,382
Percentage	71.40%	24.95%
- County results Costello: 60–70% 70–80%
U.S. Representative before election
Jerry Costello
Democratic
Elected U.S. Representative
Jerry Costello
Democratic

This district is in the southwest part of the state and includes the cities of Alton, Carbondale and East St. Louis. Democratic incumbent Jerry Costello, who has held the seat since August 1988, ran against Republican nominee Tim Richardson and Chairman of the Metro East Green Party Rodger Jennings.

=== Predictions ===
Source	Ranking	As of
The Cook Political Report	Safe D	November 6, 2008
Rothenberg	Safe D	November 2, 2008
Sabato's Crystal Ball	Safe D	November 6, 2008
Real Clear Politics	Safe D	November 7, 2008
CQ Politics	Safe D	November 6, 2008

Illinois's 12th congressional district election, 2008
Party	Candidate	Votes	%
Democratic	Jerry Costello (incumbent)	212,891	71.40
Republican	Tim Richardson	74,382	24.95
Green	Rodger Jennings	10,907	3.66
Write-ins		1	0.01
Total votes		298,181	100.00
Democratic hold			

== District 13 ==
2008 Illinois's 13th congressional district election
- November 4, 2008
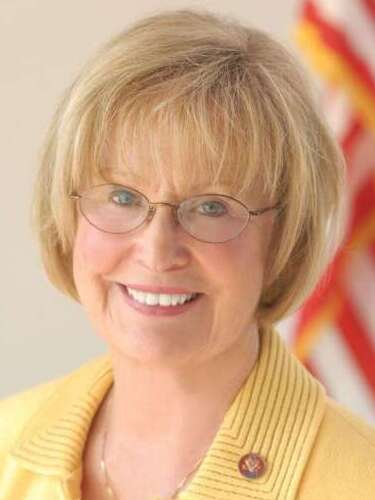

Nominee	Judy Biggert	Scott Harper
Party	Republican	Democratic
Popular vote	180,888	147,430
Percentage	53.55%	43.65%
- County results Biggert: 40–50% 50–60%
U.S. Representative before election
Judy Biggert
Republican
Elected U.S. Representative
Judy Biggert
Republican

This district includes parts of the Cook County, DuPage County and Will County. Republican incumbent Judy Biggert, who has held the seat since January 1999, ran against Democratic nominee Scott Harper and Green Party nominee Steve Alesch. CQ Politics initially forecast the race as 'Safe Republican', but changed the forecast to 'Republican Favored' after Harper had raised more money than the 2006 Democratic nominee for this seat by mid-July.

=== Predictions ===
Source	Ranking	As of
The Cook Political Report	Likely R	November 6, 2008
Rothenberg	Safe R	November 2, 2008
Sabato's Crystal Ball	Safe R	November 6, 2008
Real Clear Politics	Safe R	November 7, 2008
CQ Politics	Likely R	November 6, 2008

Illinois's 13th congressional district election, 2008
Party	Candidate	Votes	%
Republican	Judy Biggert (incumbent)	180,888	53.55
Democratic	Scott Harper	147,430	43.65
Green	Steve Alesch	9,402	2.78
Write-ins		51	0.02
Total votes		337,771	100.00
Republican hold			

== District 14 ==
2008 Illinois's 14th congressional district election
- November 4, 2008
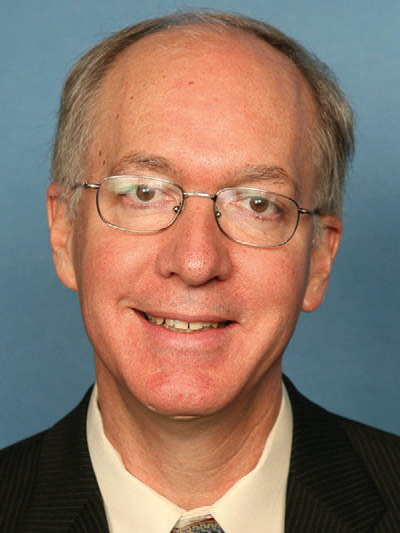

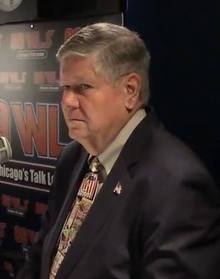
Nominee	Bill Foster	Jim Oberweis
Party	Democratic	Republican
Popular vote	185,404	135,653
Percentage	57.75%	42.25%
- County results Foster: 50–60% 60–70% Oberweis: 50–60%
U.S. Representative before election
Bill Foster
Democratic
Elected U.S. Representative
Bill Foster
Democratic

This district includes the cities of Aurora, Elgin, DeKalb and Dixon, as well as parts of Henry County, Whiteside County, Lee County, DeKalb County, Kane County, Kendall County and DuPage County. Democratic nominee Bill Foster, who had held the seat since March 2008, won against Republican nominee Jim Oberweis, who also lost to Foster in the special election. CQ Politics forecast the race as 'Leans Democratic'.

The district was previously represented by former Speaker of the House Dennis Hastert from 1987 to 2007. He resigned in November 2007; Bill Foster won the special election held on March 8, 2008.

=== Predictions ===
Source	Ranking	As of
The Cook Political Report	Likely D	November 6, 2008
Rothenberg	Safe D	November 2, 2008
Sabato's Crystal Ball	Lean D	November 6, 2008
Real Clear Politics	Safe D	November 7, 2008
CQ Politics	Likely D	November 6, 2008

Illinois's 14th congressional district election, 2008
Party	Candidate	Votes	%
Democratic	Bill Foster (incumbent)	185,404	57.75
Republican	Jim Oberweis	135,653	42.25
Total votes		321,057	100.00
Democratic hold			

== District 15 ==
2008 Illinois's 15th congressional district election
- November 4, 2008
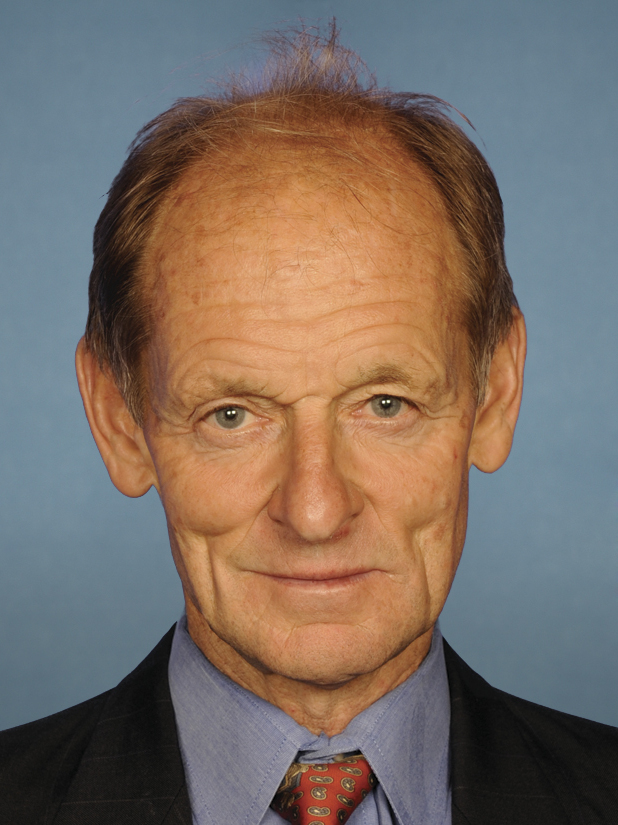

Nominee	Tim Johnson	Steve Cox
Party	Republican	Democratic
Popular vote	187,121	104,393
Percentage	64.19%	35.81%
- County results Johnson: 50–60% 60–70% 70–80% 80–90% Cox: 50–60%
U.S. Representative before election
Tim Johnson
Republican
Elected U.S. Representative
Tim Johnson
Republican

This district includes the cities of Charleston, Urbana, Danville and Champaign, as well as all or parts of Livingston County, Iroquois County, Ford County, McLean County, DeWitt County, Champaign County, Vermillion County, Macon County, Piatt County, Douglas County, Edgar County, Moultrie County, Coles County, Cumberland County, Clark County, Crawford County, Lawrence County, Wabash County, Edwards County, White County, Saline County and Gallatin County. Republican incumbent Timothy V. Johnson, who has held the seat since January 2001, won against Democratic nominee Steve Cox.

=== Predictions ===
Source	Ranking	As of
The Cook Political Report	Safe R	November 6, 2008
Rothenberg	Safe R	November 2, 2008
Sabato's Crystal Ball	Safe R	November 6, 2008
Real Clear Politics	Safe R	November 7, 2008
CQ Politics	Safe R	November 6, 2008

Illinois's 15th congressional district election, 2008
Party	Candidate	Votes	%
Republican	Timothy V. Johnson (incumbent)	187,121	64.19
Democratic	Steve Cox	104,393	35.81
Total votes		291,514	100.00
Republican hold			

== District 16 ==
2008 Illinois's 16th congressional district election
- November 4, 2008
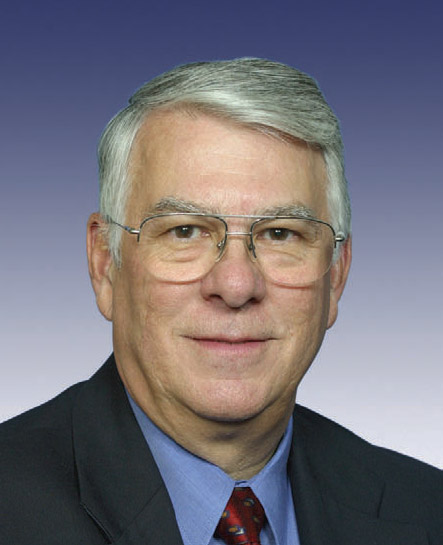

Nominee	Don Manzullo	Robert Abboud
Party	Republican	Democratic
Popular vote	190,039	112,648
Percentage	60.87%	36.08%
- County results Manzullo: 50–60% 60–70%
U.S. Representative before election
Don Manzullo
Republican
Elected U.S. Representative
Don Manzullo
Republican

This district includes the cities of Rockford, Crystal Lake, Machesney Park, Belvidere, Freeport and Galena, as well as all or parts of Jo Daviess County, Stephenson County, Winnebago County, Boone County, McHenry County, Carroll County, Ogle County, DeKalb County and Whiteside County. Republican incumbent Donald A. Manzullo, who has held the seat since 1993, won against Democratic nominee Robert G. Abboud and Green Party nominee Scott K. Summers.

=== Predictions ===
Source	Ranking	As of
The Cook Political Report	Safe R	November 6, 2008
Rothenberg	Safe R	November 2, 2008
Sabato's Crystal Ball	Safe R	November 6, 2008
Real Clear Politics	Safe R	November 7, 2008
CQ Politics	Safe R	November 6, 2008

Illinois's 16th congressional district election, 2008
Party	Candidate	Votes	%
Republican	Don Manzullo (incumbent)	190,039	60.87
Democratic	Robert G. Abboud	112,648	36.08
Green	Scott Summers	9,533	3.05
Total votes		312,220	100.00
Republican hold			

== District 17 ==
2008 Illinois's 17th congressional district election
- November 4, 2008
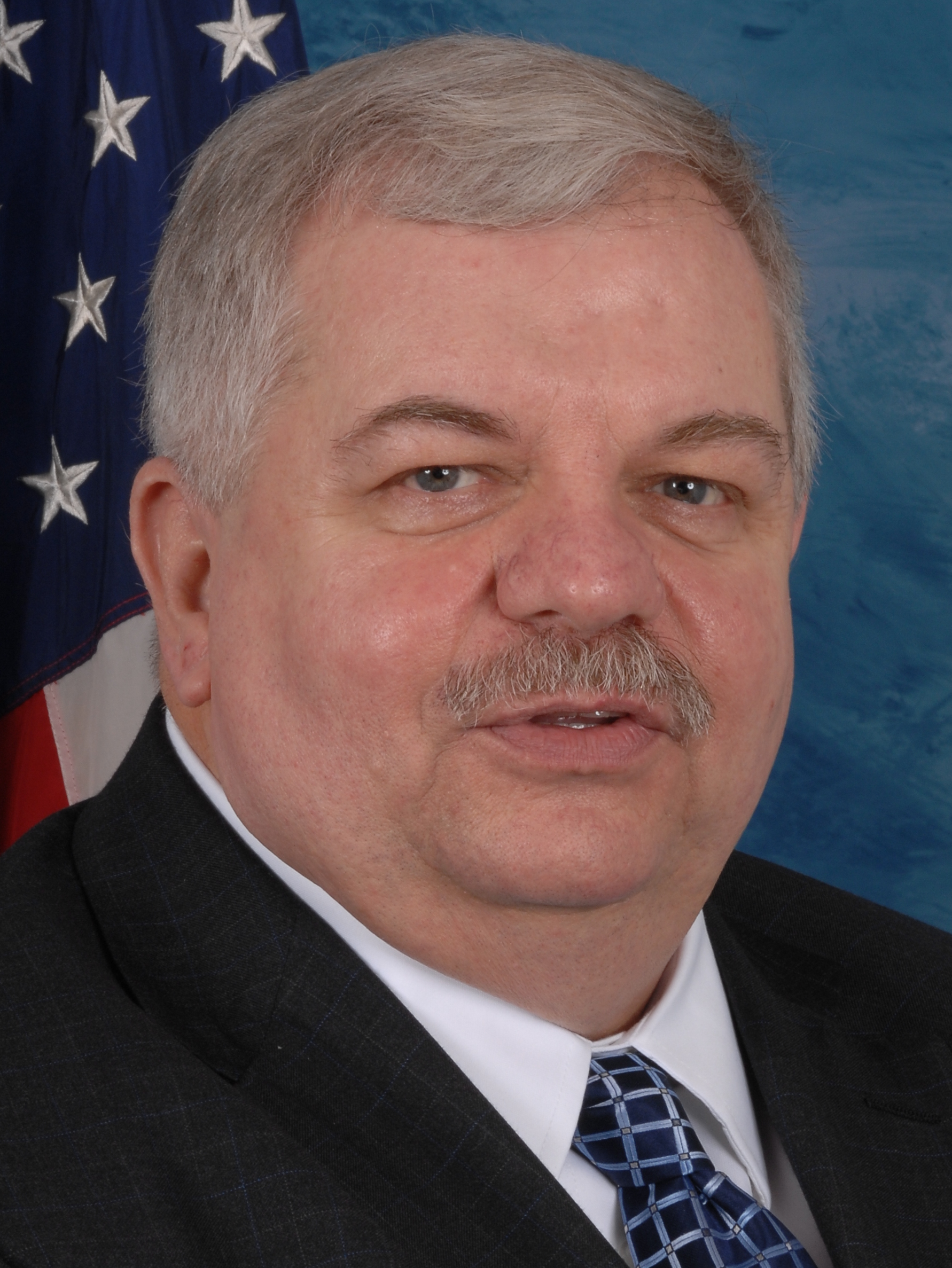
Nominee	Phil Hare
Party	Democratic
Popular vote	220,961
Percentage	99.77%
U.S. Representative before election
Phil Hare
Democratic
Elected U.S. Representative
Phil Hare
Democratic

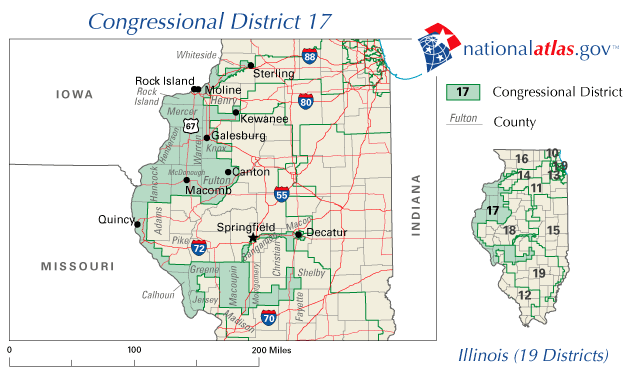

This district includes the cities of Sterling, Rock Island, Moline, Kewanee, Galesburg, Canton, Macomb, Quincy, Springfield and Decatur, as well as all or parts of Henry County, Whiteside County, Rock Island County, Mercer County, Knox County, Warren County, Henderson County, Fulton County, McDonough County, Hancock County, Adams County, Pike County, Calhoun County, Greene County, Jersey County, Macoupin County, Madison County, Montgomery County, Christian County, Sangamon County, Macon County, Shelby County and Fayette County. Democratic incumbent Phil Hare, who has held the seat since January 2007, ran unopposed.

=== Predictions ===
Source	Ranking	As of
The Cook Political Report	Safe D	November 6, 2008
Rothenberg	Safe D	November 2, 2008
Sabato's Crystal Ball	Safe D	November 6, 2008
Real Clear Politics	Safe D	November 7, 2008
CQ Politics	Safe D	November 6, 2008

Illinois's 17th congressional district election, 2008
Party	Candidate	Votes	%
Democratic	Phil Hare (incumbent)	220,961	99.77
Write-ins		517	0.23
Total votes		221,478	100.00
Democratic hold			

== District 18 ==
2008 Illinois's 18th congressional district election
- November 4, 2008
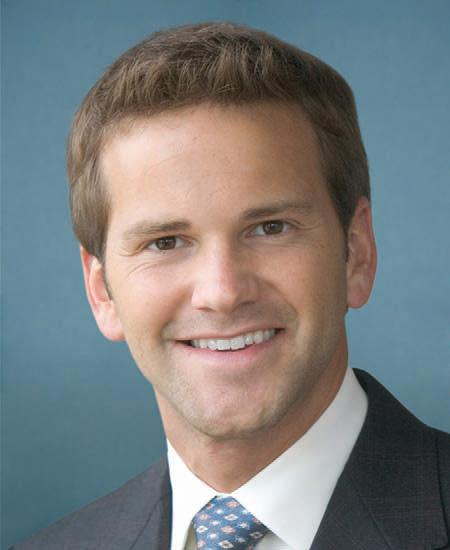

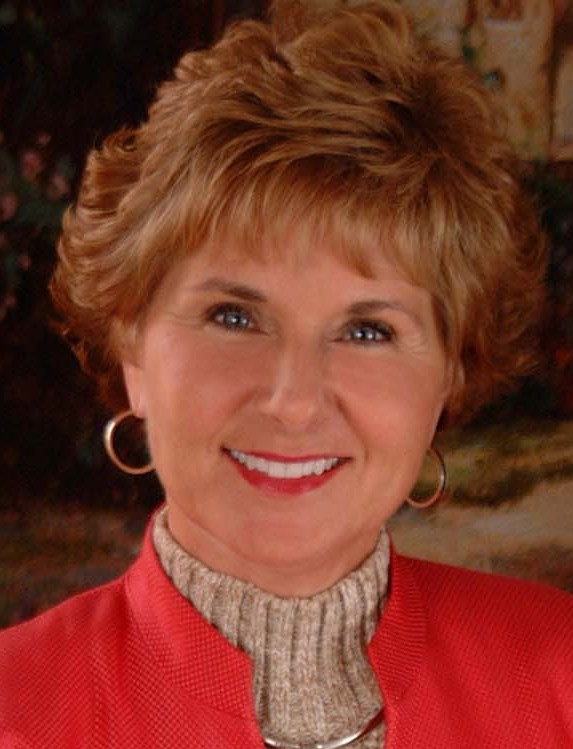
Nominee	Aaron Schock	Colleen Callahan
Party	Republican	Democratic
Popular vote	182,589	117,642
Percentage	58.88%	37.94%
- County results Schock: 50–60% 60–70% Callahan: 60–70%
U.S. Representative before election
Ray LaHood
Republican
Elected U.S. Representative
Aaron Schock
Republican

This district in the central and western part of the state includes the cities of Jacksonville, Peoria and Springfield. Republican nominee Aaron Schock won against Democratic nominee Colleen Callahan and Green nominee Sheldon Schafer. Republican incumbent Ray LaHood, who had held the seat since 1995, decided to retire, leaving this an open seat.

=== Predictions ===
Source	Ranking	As of
The Cook Political Report	Safe R	November 6, 2008
Rothenberg	Safe R	November 2, 2008
Sabato's Crystal Ball	Lean R	November 6, 2008
Real Clear Politics	Safe R	November 7, 2008
CQ Politics	Likely R	November 6, 2008

Illinois's 18th congressional district election, 2008
Party	Candidate	Votes	%
Republican	Aaron Schock	182,589	58.88
Democratic	Colleen Callahan	117,642	37.94
Green	Sheldon Schafer	9,857	3.18
Total votes		310,088	100.00
Republican hold			

== District 19 ==
2008 Illinois's 19th congressional district election
- November 4, 2008
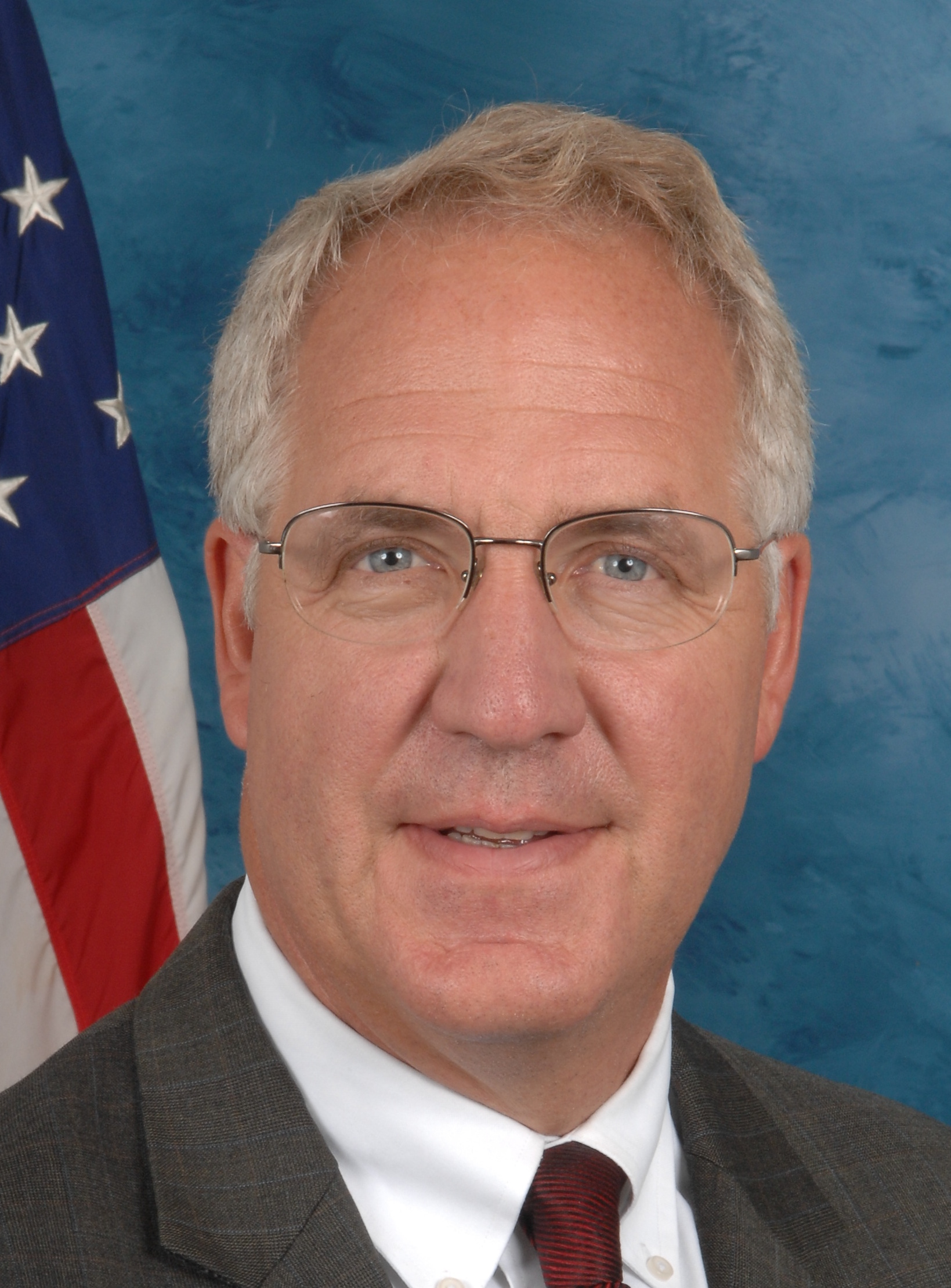

Nominee	John Shimkus	Daniel Davis
Party	Republican	Democratic
Popular vote	203,434	105,338
Percentage	64.46%	33.38%
- County results Shimkus: 40–50% 50–60% 60–70% 70–80%
U.S. Representative before election
John Shimkus
Republican
Elected U.S. Representative
John Shimkus
Republican

This district in the central part of Southern Illinois includes part of Springfield and the outer St. Louis suburbs. Republican incumbent John Shimkus, who has held the seat since 1997, won against Democratic nominee Daniel Davis and Green Party nominee Troy Dennis.

=== Predictions ===
Source	Ranking	As of
The Cook Political Report	Safe R	November 6, 2008
Rothenberg	Safe R	November 2, 2008
Sabato's Crystal Ball	Safe R	November 6, 2008
Real Clear Politics	Safe R	November 7, 2008
CQ Politics	Safe R	November 6, 2008

Illinois's 19th congressional district election, 2008
Party	Candidate	Votes	%
Republican	John Shimkus (incumbent)	203,434	64.46
Democratic	Daniel Davis	105,338	33.38
Green	Troy Dennis	6,817	2.16
Total votes		315,589	100.00
Republican hold			
