= Jill Morgenthaler =

American politician (1954–2019)

- Born: March 21, 1954
- Died: February 23, 2019 (aged 64); Dominican Republic
- Military career
- Branch: United States Army
- Rank: Colonel
- Other work: Illinois politician

Jill Morgenthaler (March 31, 1954 – February 23, 2019) was the 2008 Democratic nominee for Illinois' 6th congressional district, defeating Stan Jagla in the primary. Morgenthaler was defeated by Peter Roskam, a Wheaton, Illinois Republican, in the November 2008 general election, by a 16% margin (58% to 42%).

Morgenthaler was a retired colonel in the United States Army, where she served for nearly 30 years.

== Education ==
She received a Masters of Strategic Studies from the Army War College, a Masters of Arts in international policy studies from the Monterey Institute of International Studies, and a Bachelor of Arts from Pennsylvania State University.

== Military career ==
She enrolled in the ROTC at Pennsylvania State University, where she was one of ten women in the program who received full scholarships to trailblaze the integration of women into the program. She was the first female company commander in the Army Security Agency Group Korea, the first woman battalion commander in the 88th Regional Support Command, and the first woman brigade commander in the 84th Division.

She had served in Korea, Berlin, Bosnia, and Iraq. She handled disaster recovery during the San Francisco earthquake of 1989. In 2004, she handled press duties for the Army in Iraq, including addressing the Abu Ghraib scandal.

During her military career, she received the Legion of Merit and the Bronze Star.

== Political career ==
She was appointed by the Illinois Democratic Governor, Rod Blagojevich, to serve as a homeland security adviser in Illinois. She was the first woman in this role.

In 2008 Morgenthaler ran, as a non-resident of the 6th congressional district after the district line was redrawn by the Republican Party when U.S. Congressman Henry Hyde was in office. Morgenthaler was four blocks outside of the 6th Congressional District and had lived in Des Plaines, Illinois, for 16 years with her husband and two teenage children. The U.S. Constitution requires only that a member, when elected, be "an inhabitant of the state in which he shall be chosen." Illinois does not have a district residency requirement.

== Publications ==
- The Courage to Take Command: Leadership Lessons from a Military Trailblazer. McGraw Hill, 2015. ISBN 978-0-07-183494-0

== Death and legacy ==
Morgenthaler died on February 23, 2019, in the Dominican Republic when she collapsed after scuba diving.

== Military awards ==
- Legion of Merit
- Bronze Star Medal
- Meritorious Service Medal with two oak leaf clusters
- Army Commendation Medal
- Army Achievement Medal with oak leaf cluster
- Armed Forces Expeditionary Medal
- Iraq Campaign Medal
- Humanitarian Service Medal with bronze service star
- NATO Medal

== See also ==
- United States House of Representatives elections in Illinois, 2008#District 6
