= Cheri Bustos =

American journalist and politician (born 1961)

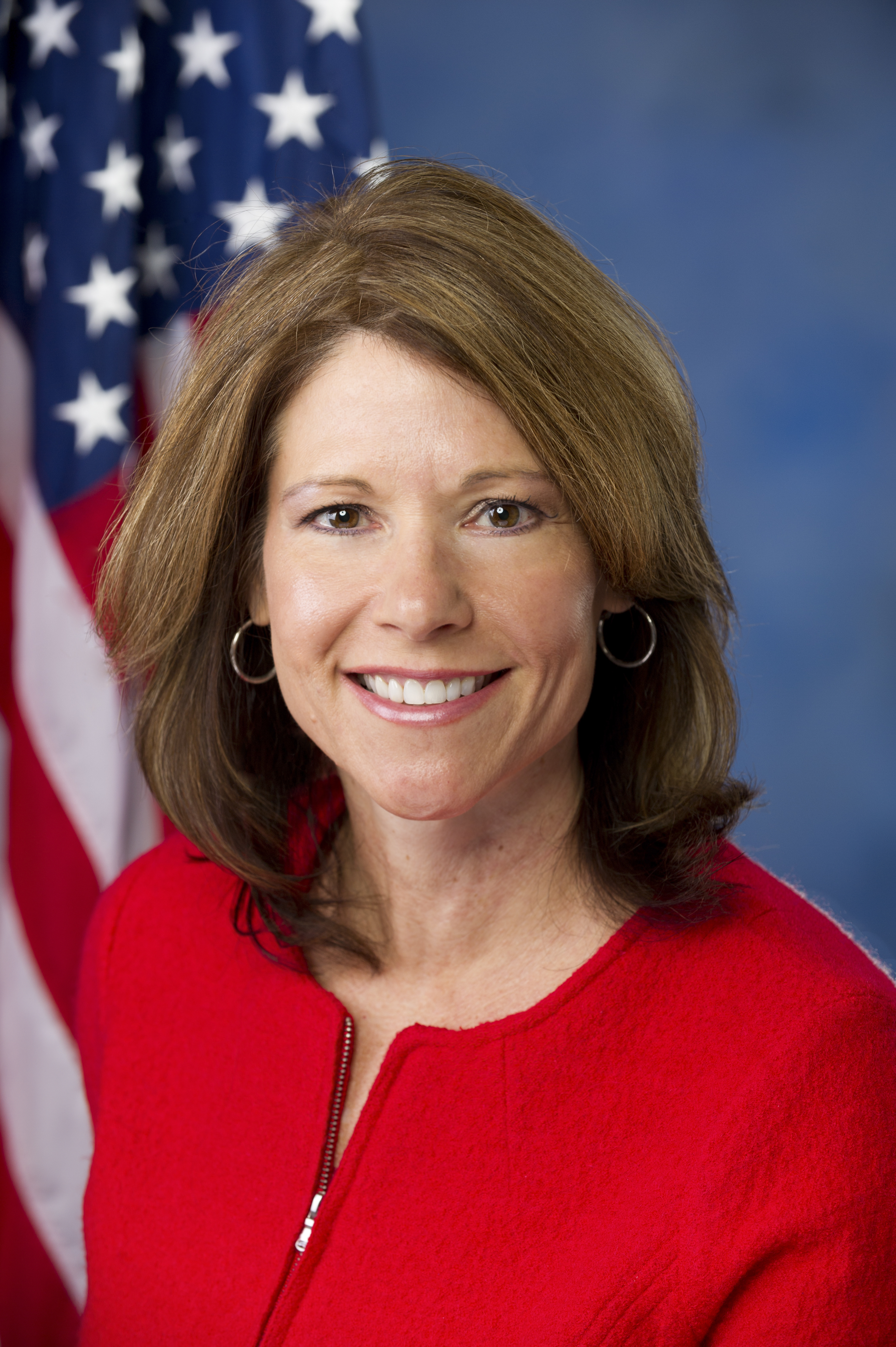
- Official portrait, 2013

Co-Chair of the House Democratic Steering Committee
- In office January 3, 2021 – January 3, 2023
- Leader: Nancy Pelosi
- Preceded by: Rosa DeLauro
- Succeeded by: Dan Kildee; Debbie Wasserman Schultz

Chair of the Democratic Congressional Campaign Committee
- In office January 3, 2019 – January 3, 2021
- Leader: Nancy Pelosi
- Preceded by: Ben Ray Luján
- Succeeded by: Sean Patrick Maloney

Co-Chair of the Democratic Policy and Communications Committee
- In office January 3, 2017 – January 3, 2019 Serving with David Cicilline and Hakeem Jeffries
- Preceded by: Steve Israel (Chair)
- Succeeded by: Matt Cartwright; Debbie Dingell; Ted Lieu

Member of the U.S. House of Representatives from Illinois's 17th district
- In office January 3, 2013 – January 3, 2023
- Preceded by: Bobby Schilling
- Succeeded by: Eric Sorensen

Personal details
- Born: Cheryl Lea Callahan; October 17, 1961 (age 65) Springfield, Illinois, U.S.
- Party: Democratic
- Spouse: Gerry Bustos
- Children: 3
- Relatives: Joseph R. Callahan (grandfather)
- Education: Illinois College (attended); University of Maryland, College Park (BA); University of Illinois, Springfield (MA)
- Bustos's voice Bustos honoring Capitol Police officers for their actions during the January 6 attack. Recorded May 12, 2021

Cheryl Lea Bustos (/ˈbuːstoʊs/ BOOST-ohss; née Callahan; born October 17, 1961) is an American lobbyist. Formerly a journalist, healthcare executive, and politician, she served as the U.S. representative from Illinois's 17th congressional district from 2013 to 2023. A member of the Democratic Party, she was the first woman elected to Congress from her district in the northwestern part of the state, anchored by the Illinois side of the Quad Cities and partially including Peoria and Rockford. In 2019, Bustos became chair of the Democratic Congressional Campaign Committee (DCCC).

Elected to the East Moline City Council in 2007, Bustos defeated Republican Party incumbent Bobby Schilling in the 2012 election and a 2014 rematch. In 2021, Bustos and Senator Dick Durbin were the only Democrats in Illinois's congressional delegation who are not from the Chicago area. On April 30, 2021, she announced that she would retire at the end of the 117th U.S. Congress.

In January 2023, the Washington, D.C. based organization Mercury Public Affairs announced that Bustos had joined the firm as a consultant.

== Early life and education ==
Bustos was born in Springfield, Illinois, one of three children of Gene and Ann Callahan. Her grandfather Joseph R. Callahan was a hog farmer and a state legislator. "We had governors over to our house. We had lieutenant governors", Bustos has said.

Her father worked for The State Journal-Register, then served as assistant press secretary to Governor Samuel Shapiro, press secretary to Lieutenant Governor Paul Simon, and chief of staff to U.S. Senator Alan Dixon. As a teen she babysat Dick Durbin's children. Her mother worked as a teacher.

Bustos graduated from Springfield High School in 1979. She attended Illinois College, then transferred to the University of Maryland, College Park, from which she received a bachelor's degree in political science in 1983. From 1983 to 1984, Bustos interned with the Illinois Senate Democrats. She went on to receive a master's degree in journalism from the University of Illinois Springfield in 1985.

== Early career ==
In 1985, Bustos moved to the Quad Cities to work as a night-shift police reporter for the Quad-City Times. She worked there for 17 years, first as a reporter and then as an editor.

From 2001 to 2007, Bustos worked as senior director of corporate communications for Trinity Regional Health Systems. From 2008 to 2011, she worked as vice president of corporate communications for Iowa Health System; in her last full year, she received overall compensation of $306,295.

== East Moline City Council ==
=== Elections ===
In 2007, Bustos ran for the East Moline City Council from that city's 4th Ward. She won the Democratic primary with 45% of the vote, and won the general election unopposed. In 2011, she was reelected unopposed.

=== Tenure ===
Before being elected in 2007, Bustos served on East Moline's Citizen Advisory Committee and the East Moline Plan Commission. In 2009, she received an Athena Business Women's Award.

In February 2010, Bustos secured state and federal money to purchase a $40,000 electronic welcome sign that was placed at the border of East Moline.

In August 2010, Bustos voted for water and sewer rate hikes. In January 2011, she expressed interest in charging residents who do not recycle extra fees to lower the city's landfill costs. In April 2011, Bustos voted for a budget that raised property taxes 4.9% and raised garbage collection fees, saying, "these decisions have been made thoughtfully and thoroughly and during the course of 17 open and public budget sessions." She also supported water and sewage increases.

Bustos was criticized for voting for a $624,000 project to improve 10th Street in East Moline, which runs adjacent to her house; the Schilling campaign dubbed it the "Bustos Parkway". Schilling's claim was called "reckless, irresponsible fiction" by the editorial board of the Quad-City Times.

After being elected to a second term in May 2011, Bustos resigned in September to focus on her campaign for Congress.

=== Committee assignments ===
- East Moline Downtown Revitalization Committee (Founded and Chaired)

== U.S. House of Representatives ==
=== Elections ===
==== 2012 ====
Bustos was endorsed by about two dozen unions active in the 17th congressional district, including the Illinois AFL–CIO, AFSCME and the United Auto Workers. During the primary, she was endorsed by Dick Durbin. Durbin asked State Senator Dave Koehler and Freeport Mayor George Gaulrapp to drop out of the race to clear the way for Bustos, a close family friend of his. Gaulrapp reported that during a meeting with Durbin about withdrawing, Durbin said that Bustos had babysat for his family and was a close friend. Bustos won the Democratic primary on March 20, 2012, defeating Gaulrapp and businessman Greg Aguilar 54% to 26% to 20%. In a July 2012 article, Bustos wrote that she was running for Congress in order to create good-paying jobs for middle-class Americans, including many "whose jobs are being shipped to China."

In the general election, Bustos was one of 39 candidates considered to be the most viable challengers against Republican incumbents to benefit from the "Red to Blue" program offered by the Democratic Congressional Campaign Committee. She was endorsed by the Quad-City Times. In November, she defeated incumbent Republican Bobby Schilling 53% to 47%. She received a significant boost from redistricting, which replaced Quincy, Decatur and the district's portion of Springfield with the more Democratic portions of Peoria and Rockford. She is the first Democrat to represent a significant portion of Peoria since 1927, and only the second Democrat since the 1850s to represent a significant portion of Rockford.

After entering the House, Bustos made national headlines by "interviewing colleagues and posting the short videos on her personal Snapchat account."

==== 2014 ====
Bustos was challenged by Schilling for reelection in 2014.

In a 2012 interview with the Chicago Tribune editorial board, Bustos expressed support for legislation that would cut congressional pay by 10%. When asked by a member of the board if she would voluntarily give up 10% of her pay should the legislation fail, she said she would. During the 2014 campaign, she said, "When I was in Chicago, I said something that I shouldn't have said, but I never said it on the campaign trail. I never made it as a promise to the people in the 17th congressional district." The Tribune endorsed Schilling.

As they did in October 2012, Bustos and Schilling agreed to debate at the WQAD-TV News 8 studio on October 9, 2014, with Good Morning Quad Cities anchor Jim Mertens as moderator.

Bustos defeated Schilling in the November 4 general election, 55% to 45%.

==== 2016 ====
Bustos was reelected to the House in the 2016 general election, defeating Republican nominee Patrick Harlan, an insurance agent, truck driver, and local Tea Party activist.

In a long profile of Bustos on May 12, 2017, Politico noted that in 2016 she was the only Democrat to win a House seat by a more than 20-point margin in a district that Trump also won. "If Democrats are going to wrest control of the House from Republicans, argue many party strategists, it's going to happen in large part by doing more of whatever it is Bustos is doing three hours west of Chicago in her nearly 7,000-square-mile district of small towns and soybean fields", Politico wrote. Calling her "one of the party's rising stars", Politico quoted her as saying, "I'm a little bit of a different kind of Democrat."

In July 2017, Bustos and Representatives Hakeem Jeffries and David Cicilline co-authored a CNN op-ed charging that thanks to Republicans, "the economy isn't working the way it should", and promising that their own economic plan would create "millions of good-paying, full-time jobs" and "build an economy that puts Americans first."

==== 2018 ====
In the 2018 election, Bustos was challenged by Bill Fawell, a real estate broker who attracted media attention for his conspiracy claims that the 9/11 attacks were an inside job perpetrated by the U.S. government. Bustos was reelected with 61.9% of the vote to Fawell's 38.1%.

=== Chair of the Democratic Congressional Campaign Committee ===
Bustos was elected by her peers to serve as Chair of the Democratic Congressional Campaign Committee during the 2020 election. During her term, Bustos led the organization to a record fundraising year and maintained the Democratic majority in the House. After Bustos chose not to seek a second term as chair, Speaker Nancy Pelosi nominated her to co-chair the House Democratic Steering Committee, replacing Rosa DeLauro, who was elected Chair of the House Appropriations Committee.

=== Potential runs for other offices ===
Bustos considered running for the U.S. Senate in the 2016 election, but announced in March 2015 that she would not.

In September 2016, reports emerged that Bustos was a possible candidate for Governor of Illinois in the 2018 election. In February 2017, Bustos declined to run in that election.

During the election for Speaker of the United States House of Representatives in January 2019, Bustos received 4 votes, from Joe Cunningham of South Carolina; Jared Golden of Maine; Mikie Sherrill of New Jersey; and Abigail Spanberger of Virginia, instead of their party's nominee, Nancy Pelosi.

=== Committee assignments ===
- Committee on Agriculture
  - Subcommittee on General Farm Commodities and Risk Management
  - Subcommittee on Livestock, Rural Development, and Credit
- Committee on Transportation and Infrastructure
  - United States House Transportation Subcommittee on Aviation
  - Subcommittee on Highways and Transit
- Committee on Appropriations

=== Caucus memberships ===
- New Democrat Coalition
- Congressional NextGen 9-1-1 Caucus
- Blue Collar Caucus

== Political positions ==
Shortly after taking office, Bustos joined the bipartisan No Labels group. In the first session of the 115th United States Congress, she was ranked the 28th most bipartisan member of the House by the Bipartisan Index, a metric published by The Lugar Center and Georgetown's McCourt School of Public Policy to assess congressional bipartisanship.

=== Economic issues ===
In 2013, Bustos's first sponsored legislation was to create a congressional government waste reduction board.

Bustos has said she wants to create a "manufacturing triangle" connecting Peoria, the Quad Cities, and Rockford and anchored by Caterpillar, John Deere, and the aerospace industry, respectively. She supports putting in place job-training programs at area community colleges to better prepare workers for skilled jobs in manufacturing.

Bustos opposed a full extension of the Bush tax cuts. She does not support lowering salaries or pensions for federal government employees.

During a debate, Bustos opposed the three trade agreements approved by Congress in 2011 for being "NAFTA-style" and said they would result in job losses for Illinois.

In 2016, Bustos sponsored the misleadingly titled "Save America’s Pastime Act", which exempted minor league baseball players from the minimum wage and maximum work hour protections of the Fair Labor Standards Act. The legislation was supported by both the MLB and MiLB. Bustos later withdrew her support for the bill after receiving criticism. Josh Norris, writing for Baseball America noted that Bustos was the daughter of Gene Callahan, the MLB's first chief lobbist, and that she had accepted $2,000 from the MLB Commissioner’s Office's PAC during the prior election cycle.

=== Environment ===
As of July 2018 the agenda Bustos proposed to the Democratic Party did not include increasing environmental protections. She was one of 29 Democrats in the House of Representatives to back the Keystone XL pipeline. Her work on the environment focussed on local issues.

=== Foreign policy ===
In March 2012, Bustos called for cuts in defense spending.

In August 2015, Bustos announced her support for President Barack Obama's Iran nuclear deal. "While the agreement is not perfect, it is the right step for our national security and the security of the global community", she said. "With this agreement, Iran's stockpiles of enriched uranium will be reduced and the country will be opened up to strict transparency and monitoring, including robust on-the-ground nuclear inspectors".

In October 2015, Bustos went to Cuba on a trip organized by the Illinois Cuba Working Group. In January 2016, she backed a bill to remove barriers to trade with Cuba. In March 2016, Bustos was part of the congressional delegation that took part in Obama's trip to Cuba and said that Cuba represented a "huge trade opportunity" for the US "when it comes to agriculture".

=== Donald Trump ===
In a December 2016 interview, Bustos said she would "make every attempt to work with President Donald Trump where we can find common ground" but "if he takes us down a dark place, then we're going to have a fight on our hands." In April 2017 she said that Trump's first 100 days in office had been "a disaster" and that his health care plan would rip out "the beating heart of rural America". The same month, during an interview with Politico, she said that if she were president, "in my first 100 days, I'd want to have a lot of wins—and, you know, I wouldn't want to have wins that I have to lie about."

In June 2017, Bustos argued that her party's "anti-Trump" message was not a winning electoral formula, and that the Democrats should focus on "showing up [and] talking nonstop about the economy and jobs and that we’re going to fight for people who need us to fight for them".

In December 2017, Bustos signed a letter asking for a House investigation into accusations of sexual misconduct against Trump.

=== Women's rights ===
Responding in 2016 to People v. Turner, Bustos said that there is a need for more women in Congress in order to bring greater attention to the issue of sexual assault.

In February 2018, Illinois House Speaker Mike Madigan announced that a group of three legislators, including Bustos, would serve on an independently funded panel that would "lead a statewide discussion about the role of women in the Democratic party and how to 'change the culture of politics.'" In April, she withdrew from the panel, citing criticism by the House Ethics Committee and legal advisers about the panel's funding.

=== Marijuana ===
Bustos was one of six House Democrats to vote against the Marijuana Opportunity Reinvestment and Expungement (MORE) Act to legalize cannabis at the federal level in 2020. She said she voted against it because it lacked clarity on what constitutes a nonviolent offense.

=== Health care and abortion ===
Bustos supports the Affordable Care Act (commonly known as Obamacare). She supports legal abortion. She also supported Obama's order that all health plans cover birth control and "morning after" pills.

=== Immigration ===
Bustos supports the DREAM Act.

== Lobbying career ==
In January 2023, the Washington, D.C.-based public affairs and lobbying firm Mercury Public Affairs announced that Bustos had joined the firm as a consultant. In March 2023, it was announced that Bustos would co-teach a campaign methods course at Monmouth College in the fall semester of 2023.

== Personal life ==
Bustos met and married Gerry Bustos, a Quad Cities local, not long after moving to the Quad Cities. He was the Rock Island County Sheriff until 2022 and was a former commander of the Quad City Bomb Squad. They have three sons and two grandchildren. Bustos is Catholic.

== Electoral history ==
East Moline, Illinois Alderman Ward 4 General Election, 2007
Party	Candidate	Votes	%
Democratic	Cheri Bustos	234	100.0
Total votes		234	100.0

East Moline, Illinois Alderman Ward 4 General Election, 2011
Party	Candidate	Votes	%
Democratic	Cheri Bustos (incumbent)	55	100.0
Total votes		55	100.0

Illinois 17th Congressional District Democratic Primary, 2012
Party	Candidate	Votes	%
Democratic	Cheri Bustos	18,652	54.40
Democratic	George Gaulrapp	8,838	25.78
Democratic	Greg Aguilar	6,798	19.83
Total votes		34,288	100.0

Illinois 17th Congressional District General Election, 2012
Party	Candidate	Votes	%
Democratic	Cheri Bustos	153,519	53.28
Republican	Bobby Schilling (incumbent)	134,623	46.72
Write-in votes	Eric Reyes	10	0.00
Write-in votes	Joe Faber	9	0.00
Total votes		288,161	100.0

Illinois 17th Congressional District General Election, 2014
Party	Candidate	Votes	%
Democratic	Cheri Bustos (incumbent)	110,560	55.46
Republican	Bobby Schilling	88,785	44.53
Write-in votes	Bill Fawell	16	0.01
Total votes		199,361	100.0

Illinois 17th Congressional District General Election, 2016
Party	Candidate	Votes	%
Democratic	Cheri Bustos (incumbent)	173,125	60.31
Republican	Patrick Harlan	113,943	39.69
Total votes		287,068	100.0

Illinois 17th Congressional District General Election, 2018
Party	Candidate	Votes	%
Democratic	Cheri Bustos (incumbent)	142,659	62.09
Republican	William W. "Bill" Fawell	87,090	37.91
Total votes		229,749	100.0

Illinois's 17th congressional district, 2020
Party	Candidate	Votes	%	±%
Democratic	Cheri Bustos (incumbent)	156,011	52.02	−10.07%
Republican	Esther Joy King	143,863	47.97	+10.06%
Write-in		21	0.01	N/A
Total votes		299,895	100.0	
Democratic hold				

== See also ==
- Women in the United States House of Representatives

U.S. House of Representatives
Preceded by Bobby Schilling	Member of the U.S. House of Representatives from Illinois's 17th congressional district 2013–2023	Succeeded by Eric Sorensen
Party political offices
Preceded by Steve Israel	Chair of the Democratic Policy and Communications Committee; 2017–2019; Served alongside: David Cicilline, Hakeem Jeffries	Succeeded by David Cicilline
Preceded by Ben Ray Luján	Chair of the Democratic Congressional Campaign Committee; 2019–2021	Succeeded by Sean Patrick Maloney
Preceded by Rosa DeLauro	Chair of the House Democratic Steering Committee; 2021–2023	Succeeded by Dan Kildee; Debbie Wasserman Schultz
U.S. order of precedence (ceremonial)
Preceded by Thomas W. Ewing as Former U.S. Representative	Order of precedence of the United States as Former U.S. Representative	Succeeded by Rodney Davis as Former U.S. Representative
