= Joe W. Russell =

American politician

Member of the Illinois House of Representatives

Personal details
- Born: near Roberts, Illinois
- Party: Democratic

Joe W. Russell was an American politician who served as a member of the Illinois House of Representatives.
