= 2015 Illinois's 18th congressional district special election =

- September 10, 2015

Illinois's 18th congressional district
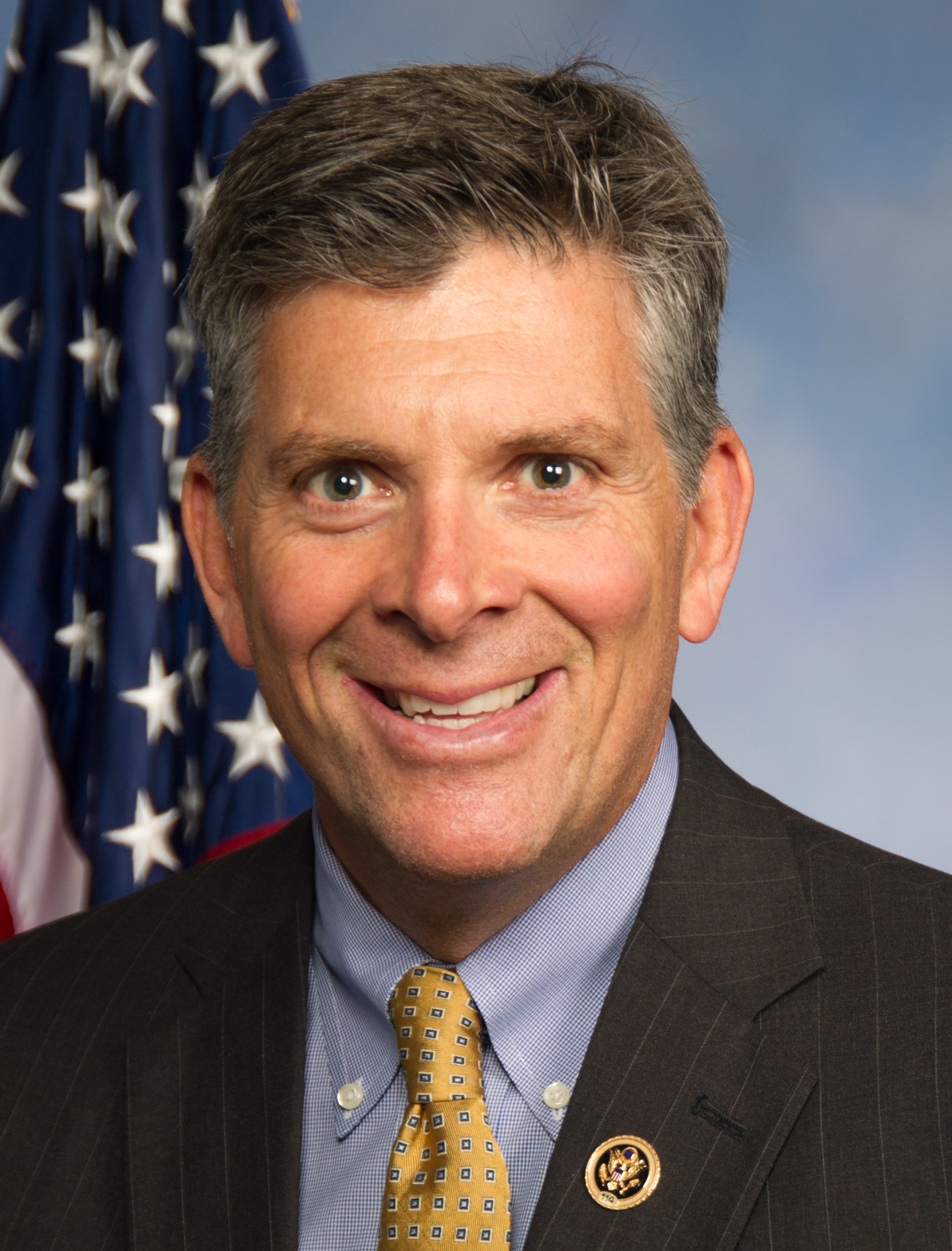

Candidate	Darin LaHood	Rob Mellon
Party	Republican	Democratic
Popular vote	35,329	15,979
Percentage	68.8%	31.1%
- County results LaHood: 50–60% 60–70% 70–80%
U.S. Representative before election
Aaron Schock
Republican
Elected U.S. Representative
Darin LaHood
Republican

The special election for Illinois's 18th congressional district was held on September 10, 2015, between Republican Darin LaHood and Democrat Rob Mellon to fill the remainder of the term of Republican Aaron Schock, who resigned on March 31, 2015. LaHood won the election with almost 68.8% of the vote.

== Background ==
Schock announced on March 17, 2015, that he would resign on March 31, 2015, following allegations of improper spending of political campaign funds and an impending ethics investigation.

According to Illinois state law, Governor Bruce Rauner had to call the special election within five days after Schock's resignation becoming official, and it must be held within 115 days of the call. This would mean that the latest possible day for the election under Illinois law would have been July 29, 2015. However, in order to comply with the federal Uniformed and Overseas Citizens Absentee Voting Act (UOCAVA), the general election was set for September 10, 2015, with party primaries to be held on July 7.

In April 2015, the Marshall County and McLean County governments requested that Schock or his campaign fund reimburse the counties for the special election costs, and two other counties considered similar action. Stark County declined to request reimbursement, as it still had $12,000 left over from the April consolidated election and Schock had not been convicted of a crime.

== Republican primary ==
=== Candidates ===
==== Declared ====
- Mike Flynn, political strategist and journalist at Breitbart News
- Darin LaHood, State Senator and son of former U.S. Representative Ray LaHood
- Donald Rients, former corrections officer

==== Withdrawn ====
- Mark Zalcman, attorney. Zalcman stated that he was forced to withdraw because a limited time to file petitions was "done purposely by the Governor to insure that Darin LaHood would not have to face any grassroots opposition in the campaign," and that he would focus on the regular March 2016 primary. Zalcman did not file for the seat in 2016.

==== Declined ====
- Jason Barickman, state senator
- Bill Brady, state senator, nominee for governor in 2010, and candidate for governor in 2006 and 2014
- Dan Brady, State Representative
- Ed Brady, real estate developer
- Tom Demmer, state representative
- Robert Kent Gray, Jr., attorney and Lincoln Land Community College Trustee
- Bobby Schilling, former U.S. Representative for Illinois's 17th congressional district
- Ryan Spain, Peoria City Councilman
- Jil Tracy, former state representative and candidate for lieutenant governor in 2014
- Michael D. Unes, state representative

=== Endorsements ===
Darin LaHood

Incumbent and prior state elected officials

- Bruce Rauner, Republican governor of Illinois
- Jim Edgar, former Republican governor of Illinois

Incumbent and prior members of the U.S. House of Representatives

- Peter Roskam, congressman for IL-6
- Mike Bost, congressman for IL-12
- Rodney Davis, congressman for IL-13
- Randy Hultgren, congressman for IL-14
- John Shimkus, congressman for IL-15
- Adam Kinzinger, congressman for IL-16
- Bobby Schilling, former congressman for IL-17
- Joe Walsh, former congressman for IL-8
- Thomas W. Ewing, former congressman for IL-15

Incumbent Illinois legislative officials

- Jason Barickman, state senator for IL-53
- Bill Brady, state senator for IL-44
- Chapin Rose, state senator for IL-51
- Sam McCann, state senator for IL-50
- Kyle McCarter, state senator for IL-54
- Jim Oberweis, state senator for IL-25
- Dan Brady, state representative for IL-105
- Keith P. Sommer, state representative for IL-88
- Tom Morrison, state representative for IL-54

Other people

- Dan Proft, conservative talk radio host and candidate for Illinois governor in 2010
- Penny Pullen, former Illinois state representative and conservative activist
- Paul Schimpf, former Republican nominee for Illinois Attorney General in 2014

Organizations

- National Right to Life
- NRA Political Victory Fund
- United States Chamber of Commerce

Newspapers

- Journal Star
Mike Flynn
- Ted Cruz, Republican United States Senator from Texas and candidate for President of the United States in 2016
- Mark Levin, conservative talk radio host
- Steve King, congressman for Iowa's 4th congressional district
- Louie Gohmert, congressman for Texas's 1st congressional district
- Richard Viguerie, conservative activist and chairman of ConservativeHQ.com
- Stephen Moore, economic writer and policy analyst, founder and former president of the Club for Growth, and chief economist of The Heritage Foundation
- Erick Erickson, conservative blogger and editor-in-chief and CEO of RedState

=== Results ===
Republican primary results
Party	Candidate	Votes	%
Republican	Darin LaHood	31,635	69.5
Republican	Mike Flynn	12,593	27.7
Republican	Donald Rients	1,246	2.7
Republican	Robin Miller	16	>0.0
Total votes		45,490	100

== Democratic primary ==
=== Candidates ===
==== Declared ====
- Adam Lopez, member of the Springfield School Board and a Country Financial representative
- Rob Mellon, teacher and candidate in 2014

==== Declined ====
- Colleen Callahan, State Director for USDA Rural Development and nominee in 2008
- Sonni Choi Williams, deputy corporation counsel for the City of Peoria
- Kristin Dicenso, advisor for the Illinois Department of Transportation
- Jehan Gordon-Booth, State Representative
- Dave Koehler, State Senator
- Andy Manar, State Senator
- John M. Sullivan, State Senator

=== Results ===
Democratic primary results
Party	Candidate	Votes	%
Democratic	Rob Mellon	4,613	60.5
Democratic	Adam Lopez	3,008	39.5
Total votes		7,621	100

== General election ==
=== Predictions ===
Source	Ranking	As of
The Cook Political Report	Solid R	April 3, 2015
Inside Elections	Solid R	March 24, 2015

=== Finance Reports ===
Campaign Finance Reports through August 21
Candidate	Raised	Spent	Cash on Hand	Debt
Darin LaHood	$1,225,929	$906,379	$639,101	$0
Rob Mellon	$10,769	$9,503	$1,265	$0
Source: OpenSecrets

=== Results ===
Illinois's 18th congressional district special election, 2015
Party	Candidate	Votes	%
Republican	Darin LaHood	35,329	68.8
Democratic	Rob Mellon	15,979	31.1
Write-In	Constant "Conner" Vlakancic	7	>0.0
Write-In	Roger K. Davis	4	>0.0
Total votes		51,319	100
Republican hold			

== See also ==
- List of special elections to the United States House of Representatives
