= Ray LaHood =

American politician (born 1945)

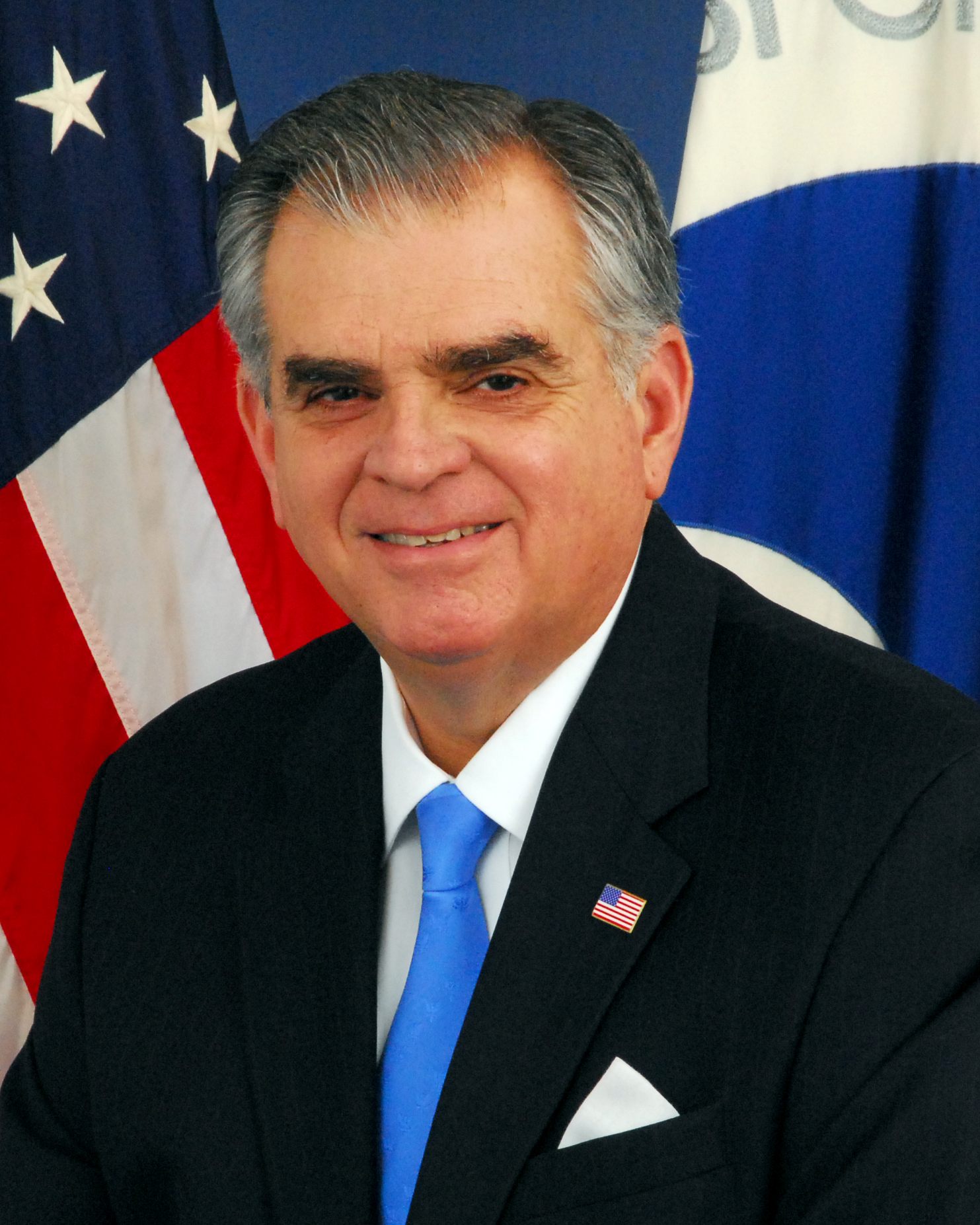
- Official portrait, 2009

16th United States Secretary of Transportation
- In office January 23, 2009 – July 2, 2013
- President: Barack Obama
- Deputy: Thomas J. Barrett; John Porcari
- Preceded by: Mary Peters
- Succeeded by: Anthony Foxx

Member of the U.S. House of Representatives from Illinois's 18th district
- In office January 3, 1995 – January 3, 2009
- Preceded by: Robert Michel
- Succeeded by: Aaron Schock

Member of the Illinois House of Representatives from the 72nd district
- In office May 1, 1982 – January 11, 1983
- Preceded by: Ben Polk
- Succeeded by: Bob DeJaegher

Personal details
- Born: December 6, 1945 (age 80) Peoria, Illinois, U.S.
- Party: Republican
- Spouse: Kathy
- Children: 4, including Darin
- Education: Spoon River College (attended); Bradley University (BS)
- LaHood's voice LaHood before the Senate Commerce Committee on the FY2012 DOT budget. Recorded March 8, 2011

Raymond H. LaHood (/ləˈhʊd/ lə-HOOD; born December 6, 1945) is an American politician who served as the 16th United States Secretary of Transportation from 2009 to 2013 under President Barack Obama. A member of the Republican Party, he previously served in the Illinois House of Representatives (1982–1983) and United States House of Representatives (1995–2009).

In 2015, Seeking Bipartisanship: My Life in Politics, a book by Ray LaHood, coauthored with Frank H. Mackaman of The Dirksen Congressional Center, was published by Cambria Press.

In 2017, LaHood admitted to the Federal Bureau of Investigation (FBI) that while holding federal office he had accepted a $50,000 payment from a foreign national for personal home repairs, and that he violated federal government ethics by not reporting the payment on his Office of Government Ethics Form 278. In 2019, government prosecutors and LaHood agreed to a Non-Prosecution Agreement that required LaHood to admit responsibility, repay the $50,000 loan and pay a $40,000 fine to the U.S. government.

== Early life and education ==
LaHood was born in Peoria, Illinois, the son of Edward M. LaHood, a Lebanese American who managed a restaurant, and Mary A. LaHood (née Vogel), who was of German ancestry. In 2006, he was one of four Arab American members of Congress.

He graduated from Spalding Institute (now Peoria Notre Dame High School), worked his way through Canton Junior College and Bradley University in Peoria, earning a Bachelor of Science in education and sociology in 1971.

== Career ==
Following graduation, he taught middle school social studies at public and Catholic schools, and has said that "teaching kids ... about the constitution and government" stirred his interest in politics.

LaHood was director of the Rock Island County Youth Services Bureau and then district administrative assistant for U.S. representative Tom Railsback, a Moline, Illinois Republican, from 1977 to 1982. He was appointed in 1982 to fill a vacant seat in the Illinois House of Representatives, serving for nine months, and running for the seat in November 1982, but losing to Democratic candidate Bob DeJaegher. LaHood then became administrative assistant and ultimately the chief of staff to U.S. House Minority Leader Robert Michel, serving from 1982 until 1994.

=== Congress ===
When Michel announced his retirement in 1994, LaHood ran for and won his seat in the House, representing Illinois's 18th congressional district. LaHood was one of only three Republicans elected to the House that year who did not sign on to the Contract with America, Newt Gingrich's manifesto for a Republican majority, and was a member of the moderate Republican Main Street Partnership. In 1997, in an effort to promote bipartisan cooperation, LaHood organized bipartisan retreats for members of Congress.

During his service in Congress, he became well known among C-SPAN viewers for frequently serving as Speaker Pro Tempore of the House, presiding over more debates than any other member. Most notably, in 1998 he presided over the contentious debate over the impeachment of President Bill Clinton.

LaHood was a strong advocate for preserving the legacy of Abraham Lincoln; LaHood's district covered much of the territory that Lincoln represented during his single term in the House. LaHood authored a law that established the Abraham Lincoln Bicentennial Commission, which laid the groundwork for celebrating the 16th President's 200th birthday in 2009, and he was also a lead Capitol Hill supporter for the Lincoln Presidential Library in Springfield, Illinois.

LaHood served on the House Transportation and Infrastructure Committee from 1995 until 2000, the House Permanent Select Committee on Intelligence beginning in 1998, and the House Appropriations Committee beginning in 2000. In 2005 he voted against renewing the PATRIOT Act, saying he opposed extending its intrusive police powers.

LaHood was said to be considering a challenge to Democratic Governor Rod Blagojevich's re-election bid in 2006, but chose to run for another term in Congress instead. He won the 2006 race against Steve Waterworth by a margin of 147,108 (67%) to 71,106 (33%). On July 26, 2007, LaHood stated he would not seek re-election in 2008.

In August 2007, LaHood received a 0% rating from the fiscally conservative 501(c)4 organization Club for Growth 2007 RePORK Card. He received an 11% rating from the conservative lobbying group Citizens Against Government Waste in August 2007, and holds a lifetime 49% rating from the group.

In 2007 LaHood considered, but later decided against, applying for the post of president of Bradley University.

During the 2008 presidential election, LaHood supported John McCain, but criticized the rallies being held by McCain's vice presidential nominee, Sarah Palin, saying she should stop "name calling", and that the tactic could backfire. "This doesn't befit the office that she's running for. And frankly, people don't like it," he said.

=== Secretary of Transportation ===
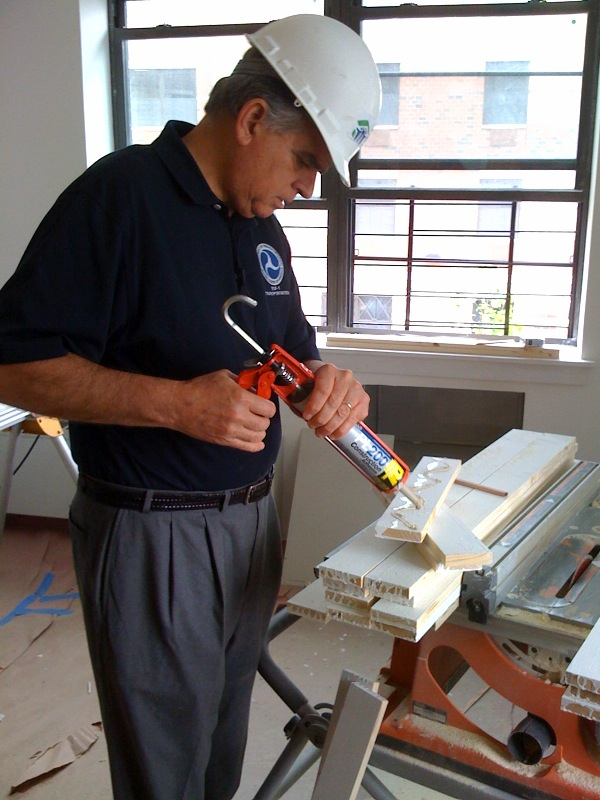
LaHood works on a Habitat for Humanity project in Brooklyn, New York City, June 2009

On December 19, 2008, President-elect Barack Obama announced that he would nominate LaHood to be the next Transportation Secretary. LaHood served on the House Transportation and Infrastructure Committee from 1995 to 2000. As a member of the House Appropriations Committee he won praise for his "skills as an arbiter" in being able to bridge sometimes bitter partisan divides in the Congress, something the position would require. Some critics alleged a reputation for pork barrel spending, including in support of campaign contributors. The Washington Post reported that of the $60 million in earmarks LaHood secured for his district in 2008, $9 million went to campaign donors.

His nomination was confirmed by the Senate by voice vote on January 21, 2009. He was, with Robert Gates, one of two Republican members of the original Obama Cabinet.

On February 3, 2010, LaHood was criticized for advice he was asked to give while testifying before a congressional committee regarding Toyota's recall of 2.3 million vehicles due to sudden acceleration, wherein he suggested Toyota owners stop driving their cars. LaHood qualified his statement within an hour and a half of his testimony, spelling out that he meant "owners of any recalled Toyota models (should) contact their local dealer and get their vehicles fixed as soon as possible."

LaHood is a supporter of airline passenger rights to facilities, food and water during lengthy on-aircraft delays. He is also a strong proponent of high-speed rail, saying "This is what the American people want. If you build it, they will come."

On December 6, 2011, LaHood accepted the resignation of FAA Administrator Randy Babbitt, who was charged with drunk driving near his Washington home.

In February 2013, LaHood lamented the low amount of infrastructure spending that was approved by Congress during his tenure at the Department of Transportation. "America is one big pothole right now," LaHood said in an interview on The Diane Rehm Show on National Public Radio. He went on to mention that Congress passed a $105 billion surface transportation bill last year, but he lamented the fact that the measure only provided appropriations for road and transit projects until 2014. "Congress passed a two-year bill. Ordinarily they would pass a five year bill," he said. "It was only a two-year bill because they couldn't find enough money to fund a five-year bill."

LaHood announced his plans to step down as Transportation Secretary at the end of Obama's first term in 2013. He did not seek any public office after that and instead entered the private sector. On January 29, 2013, LaHood announced he would resign as the Secretary of the Department of Transportation upon the confirmation of his successor by the United States Senate. President Obama nominated Anthony Foxx, the incumbent Mayor of Charlotte, North Carolina, to succeed LaHood. Foxx was subsequently confirmed by the U.S. Senate and was sworn into the position on July 2, 2013.

=== Post-federal career ===
On November 21, 2019, Governor J. B. Pritzker nominated LaHood to serve as a member of the Abraham Lincoln Presidential Library and Museum Board of Trustees. He resigned his job in April 2021 after it emerged that he had paid a $40,000 fine for failing to disclose a $50,000 loan he had received from Lebanese-Nigerian businessman Gilbert Chagoury.

LaHood did not support Donald Trump in the 2016, 2020, and 2024 presidential elections, and endorsed the Democratic nominee Joe Biden in 2020 and Kamala Harris in 2024.

== Honors ==
In May 2013, Illinois State Representative Jehan Gordon-Booth, who, like LaHood did in the U.S. Congress, represents a central Illinois district, introduced legislation in the Illinois House of Representatives Rules Committee (House Joint Resolution 35) that, if passed by the state House and Senate and signed by Governor Pat Quinn, would rename a 6-mile stretch of Interstate 74 from the Murray Baker Bridge (over the Illinois River between Tazewell and Peoria Counties) to Sterling Avenue exit as the Ray LaHood Highway. That section corresponds to much of what was contained in the major multi-year revision that was the Upgrade 74 project in the last decade (the 2000s) that LaHood had backed in the later years of his tenure in the U.S. House.

Also that month, in recognition of his Congressional and Cabinet service as he neared his last days in office, a portrait of him (with a bust of Abraham Lincoln's head in the background—LaHood had represented his 18th Illinois congressional district and named the headquarters of his agency after him) by Simmie Knox. The portrait was unveiled and dedicated at the Abraham Lincoln U.S. Department of Transportation Building in the presence of LaHood's family, U.S. Merchant Marines, Shaun Donovan (Secretary of the United States Department of Housing and Urban Development), and Janet Napolitano (Secretary of the United States Department of Homeland Security), as well as his predecessor in Congress for Illinois's 18th congressional district, former U.S. House Minority Leader Robert Michel.

He was Inducted as a Laureate of The Lincoln Academy of Illinois and awarded the Order of Lincoln (the State's highest honor) by the Governor of Illinois in 2016 in the area of Government and Law. The new international terminal, with full U.S. Customs, TSA and Port of Entry services, at the General Wayne A. Downing Peoria International Airport, was named for him in April 2016. It opened in late May 2016.

== Electoral history ==
LaHood's congressional seat, Illinois's 18th congressional district, has been Republican since 1939.

Illinois's 18th congressional district: Results 1994–2006
Year	Democrat	Votes	Pct	Republican	Votes	Pct	
1994	G. Douglas Stephens	78,332	39%	Ray LaHood	119,838	60%	*
1996	Mike Curran	98,413	41%	Ray LaHood	143,110	59%	
1998	(no candidate)			Ray LaHood	158,175	100%	*
2000	Joyce Harant	85,317	33%	Ray LaHood	173,706	67%	
2002	(no candidate)			Ray LaHood	192,567	100%	
2004	Steve Waterworth	91,548	30%	Ray LaHood	216,047	70%	
2006	Steve Waterworth	73,052	33%	Ray LaHood	150,194	67%	

* Write-in and minor candidate notes: In 1994, write-ins received 955 votes. In 1998, write-ins received 2 votes.

LaHood did not to seek re-election in 2008, and Barack Obama nominated him to be U.S. Secretary of Transportation. Illinois State Representative Aaron Schock of Peoria won the seat for the Republicans in the 2008 election.

== Personal life ==
LaHood and his wife Kathleen have a residence in Peoria, Illinois. Ray and Kathy have four children—Darin, Amy, Sam, and Sara. Their son Darin LaHood is a current member of the U.S. House of Representatives, having represented Illinois's 18th congressional district since a 2015 special election, and previously served in the Illinois Senate.

On January 21, 2012, LaHood's son, Sam LaHood, was detained by the Egyptian government and not allowed to leave the country as part of a politically charged criminal investigation by the Egyptian government into the activities of non-governmental organizations (NGOs) monitoring local elections in Egypt. LaHood's son is the Egypt director of the International Republican Institute. The Egyptian government detained twelve NGO representatives from leaving Egypt.

On February 5, 2012, Egyptian authorities charged LaHood's son and 42 other individuals with "spending money from organizations that were operating in Egypt without a license." Nineteen Americans were part of the 42 charged. The U.S. government said that $1.5 billion in U.S. aid to Egypt could be withheld if the investigation was not finished quickly. Faiza Abu Naga, Egypt's Minister of International Cooperation, was seen as the person pushing the investigation forward. Sam LaHood left Egypt along with several foreign NGO workers on March 1, 2012. Sam LaHood was tried in absentia by an Egyptian criminal court, and convicted of operating without a license and receiving foreign funding. He was given a five-year jail term and fined 1,000 Egyptian pounds ($143).

== Federal investigation ==
In 2012, while serving as U.S. Secretary of Transportation, LaHood accepted a $50,000 check that he knew had originated from Gilbert Chagoury, a foreign national. LaHood failed to disclose this on two government ethics forms, and he also made misleading statements to the FBI when asked about the source of the check.

The Department of Justice considered the investigation resolved in March 2021 after LaHood agreed to pay a $40,000 fine.

== Publications ==
- Ray LaHood with Frank H. Mackaman (2015). Seeking Bipartisanship: My Life in Politics. Cambria Press. ISBN 9781604979053.

== See also ==
- List of Arab and Middle-Eastern Americans in the United States Congress
- List of U.S. political appointments that crossed party lines

U.S. House of Representatives
Preceded by Robert Michel	Member of the U.S. House of Representatives from Illinois's 18th congressional district 1995–2009	Succeeded by Aaron Schock
Political offices
Preceded by Mary Peters	United States Secretary of Transportation; 2009–2013	Succeeded by Anthony Foxx
U.S. order of precedence (ceremonial)
Preceded by Janet Napolitano as Former U.S. Cabinet Member	Order of precedence of the United States as Former U.S. Cabinet Member	Succeeded by Timothy Geithner as Former U.S. Cabinet Member
