= Thomas J. Barrett =

American Coast Guard admiral

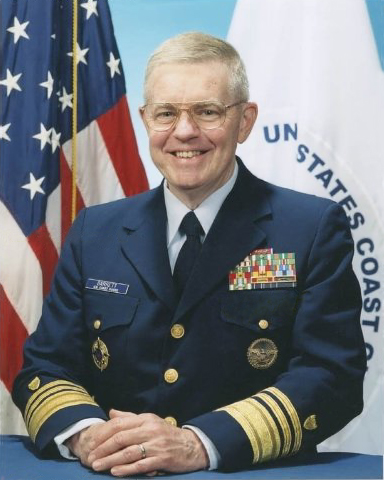
- VADM Thomas J. Barrett

9th United States Deputy Secretary of Transportation
- In office June 1, 2007 – May 1, 2009
- President: George W. Bush; Barack Obama
- Secretary: Mary Peters; Ray LaHood
- Preceded by: Maria Cino
- Succeeded by: John Porcari

Personal details
- Born: January 15, 1947 (age 79) New York City, New York, U.S.

Military service
- Allegiance: United States of America
- Branch/service: United States Coast Guard
- Years of service: 1969–2004
- Rank: Vice Admiral
- Battles/wars: Cold War; September 11, 2001 attacks

Thomas J. Barrett (born January 15, 1947) is a former United States Coast Guard officer and former Deputy Secretary of Transportation from 2007 until 2009.

== Career ==
Barrett earned a B.S. in Biology from Le Moyne College, Syracuse, New York and a Juris Doctor with honors from the George Washington University. He graduated from Army War College and the National Defense University Capstone Course in National Security Strategy and Military Capabilities.

He served 35 years in the U.S. Coast Guard and held the position of Vice Commandant of the United States Coast Guard from 2002 until 2004. In that capacity, he served as second in command, Agency Acquisition Executive, coordinated the Coast Guard Leadership Council, and co-chaired with the Vice Chief of Naval Operations the Navy-Coast Guard Board, an inter-service policy coordination body. He was instrumental in improving maritime security post 9/11, expanding Coast Guard support to the National Foreign Intelligence Community, supporting Operation Iraqi Freedom, and smoothly transitioning the Coast Guard into the new Department of Homeland Security. Barrett was the Vice President and Chief Operating Officer of the Potomac Institute for Policy Studies.

On May 31, 2006 Barrett was sworn in by then Transportation Secretary Norman Y. Mineta as the first permanent administrator of the Pipeline and Hazardous Materials Safety Administration (PHMSA).

From 2007 to 2009 Barrett served as Deputy Secretary of the U.S. Department of Transportation, responsible for its day-to-day management, the $61.1 billion budget, 10 modal administrations, and approximately 60,000 employees while continuing his duties as PHMSA administrator.

Barrett became the President of Alyeska Pipeline Service Company, which operates the Trans-Alaska Pipeline System (TAPS), on January 1, 2011. He retired from the company in December 2019, when fellow former PHMSA-head Brigham McCown was announced as the new president.

== Personal life ==
Barrett is married to the former Sheila Walker of Syracuse, New York. They are parents of four children, Tom, a Major in the United States Army and Iraq veteran, Matt, Rebecca and Paul, a Lance Corporal in the United States Marine Corps Reserve, also Iraq veteran.

Military offices
Preceded by Thomas H. Collins	Vice Commandant of the United States Coast Guard; 2002–2004	Succeeded by Terry M. Cross
Political offices
Preceded by Maria Cino	United States Deputy Secretary of Transportation; 2007–2009	Succeeded by John Porcari
