= Mike Flynn (editor) =

American journalist (1967–2016)

- Born: October 19, 1967; Quincy, Illinois, U.S.
- Died: June 23, 2016 (aged 48); Washington, D.C., U.S.
- Education: University of Iowa
- Occupations: Journalist; commentator
- Political party: Republican
- Spouse: Holly Pitt-Young
- Children: 4

Mike Flynn (October 19, 1967 – June 23, 2016) was an American online journalist who was known as the original editor of the website Breitbart News.

== Early life ==
Born and raised in Quincy, Illinois, Flynn was a sixth-generation native of central Illinois. He graduated from Quincy High School in 1985 and graduated from University of Iowa in 1989. From 1989 until 1992, Flynn was the general manager of the Coca-Cola Bottling Company in Keokuk, Iowa.

== Career ==
According to the Quincy Herald-Whig, Flynn self-described "as a strongly conservative libertarian," and he emphasized the U.S. national debt, reducing government regulations, and border security.

Flynn worked on the staff of the Illinois General Assembly from 1992 to 1997, and then for the American Legislative Exchange Council from 1997 to 2004. He was a lobbyist with the Reason Foundation. Flynn testified numerous times before the U.S. Congress and dozens of state legislatures. His research has been cited by publications such as The Wall Street Journal, The Washington Post, and The New York Times.

In 2015, Flynn ran for Congress during the Illinois's 18th congressional district special election to fill the remainder of the term of Republican Aaron Schock, who resigned on March 31, 2015. State Senator Darin LaHood defeated Flynn in the Republican primary on July 7, 2015, with 69.5% of the vote to Flynn's 27.7%.

In 2016, Flynn served as a member of the leadership team in Illinois for Ted Cruz's presidential campaign, and at the time of his death, was scheduled to be a delegate for Cruz at the 2016 Republican National Convention.

== Personal life ==
Flynn was married to his wife, Holly Flynn Pitt-Young, and had four children. He died from a heart attack in Washington, D.C., on June 23, 2016, aged 48.

== See also ==
- 2015 Illinois's 18th congressional district special election
- American Legislative Exchange Council
- Andrew Breitbart
- Breitbart News
