= Terry M. Cross =

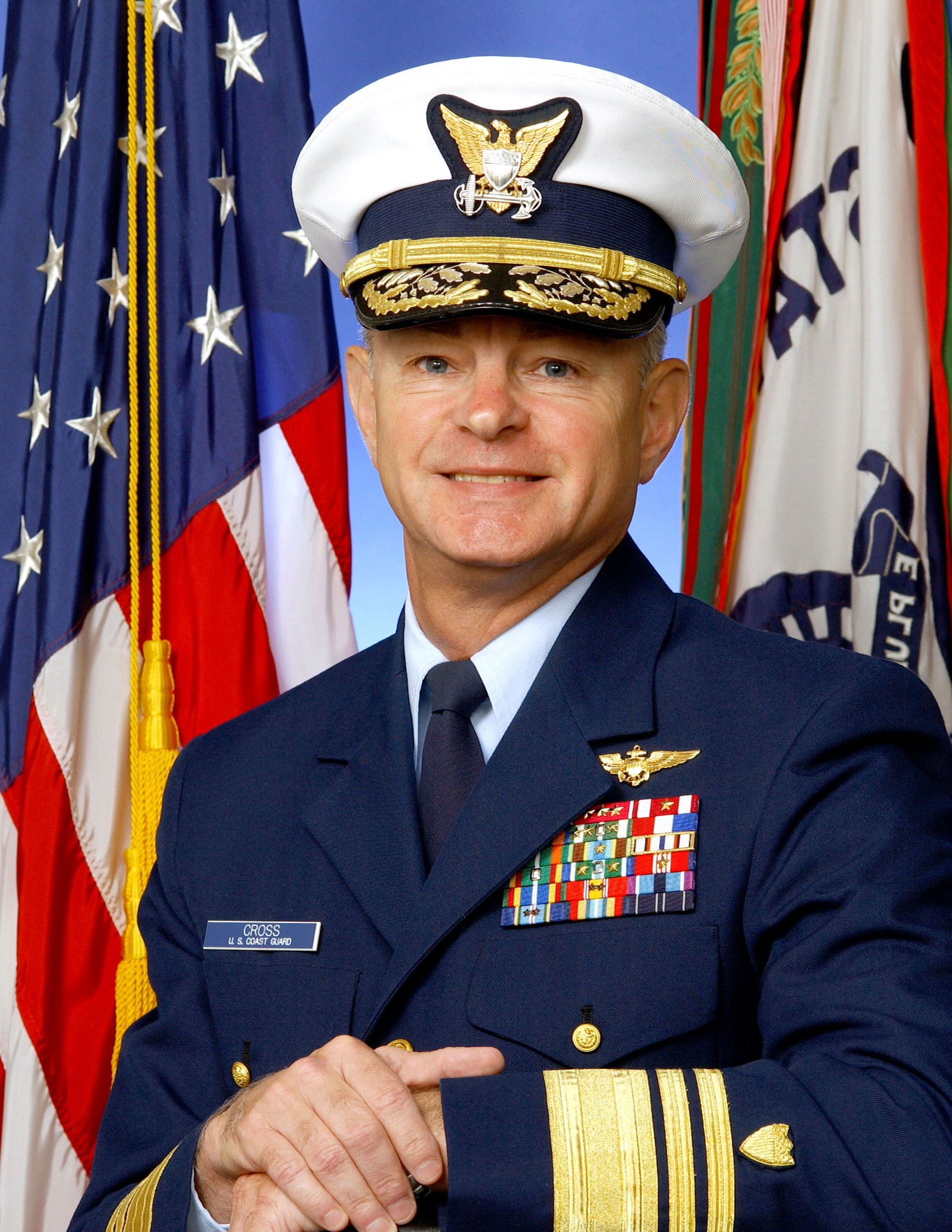
- Vice Admiral Terry M. Cross; 24th Vice-Commandant of the United States Coast Guard
- Born: December 1947 (age 78)
- Military career
- Allegiance: United States of America
- Branch: Coast Guard
- Service years: 1970-2006 (36 years)
- Rank: Vice Admiral
- Commands: Coast Guard Pacific Area; Assistant Commandant for Operations; Eleventh Coast Guard District; Seventeenth Coast Guard District; Director of Operations Policy at Coast Guard Headquarters
- Conflicts: Cold War; September 11, 2001 attacks
- Awards: Coast Guard Distinguished Service Medal (2); Legion of Merit (4)

Terry M. Cross (born December 1947) is a retired United States Coast Guard Vice Admiral who served as Vice Commandant of the United States Coast Guard from July 2004 until June 2006. He served as the Coast Guard's second in command and was the Agency Acquisition Executive.

== Career ==
Cross graduated from the United States Coast Guard Academy in 1970 with a B.S. degree in Engineering. He also earned a master's degree in Industrial Administration from Purdue University's Krannert School of Management and is a graduate of the National War College.

Some of his early operational assignments include service as a Deck Watch Officer aboard the cutter USCGC McCulloch, Operations Officer of Air Station Cape Cod, Massachusetts, and Commanding Officer of Air Station San Francisco, California. Staff assignments included service as the Chief of Staff, Atlantic Area; Chief, Office of Programs; Chief, Office of Budget; and Chief, Office of Acquisition Resource Management at Coast Guard Headquarters.

He served as Commander, Pacific Area. VADM Cross was responsible for all Coast Guard operations west of the Rocky Mountains and throughout the Pacific Basin to the Far East, an area encompassing over 73 million square miles. Under his leadership, Pacific Area units established the first Coast Guard maritime intelligence fusion center, participated in the Iraq War and Operation Liberty Shield, and set new records for illegal drug seizures.

VADM Cross served as the Assistant Commandant for Operations, where he was responsible for management oversight of all Coast Guard operating programs, including maritime safety, law enforcement, intelligence, and national defense. He initiated the Coast Guard's Maritime Domain Awareness initiative, succeeded in gaining formal membership in the Intelligence Community for the Coast Guard and led efforts that rapidly supported the Coast Guard's Homeland Security Strategy, including the development of deployable Maritime Safety and Security Teams. Cross's other flag assignments included service as Commander, Eleventh Coast Guard District; Commander, Seventeenth Coast Guard District and Director of Operations Policy at Coast Guard Headquarters.

Military offices
| Preceded by Thomas J. Barrett | Vice Commandant of the United States Coast Guard; 2004 - 2006 | Succeeded by Vivien S. Crea |
