= Dale Risinger =

American politician

Member of the Illinois Senate from the 37th district
- In office January 8, 2003 – February 28, 2011
- Preceded by: Todd Sieben (redistricted)
- Succeeded by: Darin LaHood

Personal details
- Born: January 10, 1944 (age 82) Odin, Illinois, U.S.
- Party: Republican
- Spouse: Joyce Risinger
- Profession: Civil engineer

Dale Risinger is an American civil engineer and Republican politician from Illinois. He was a member of the Illinois State Senate from 2003 to 2011.

== Early life, education and business career ==
Risinger was born in Odin, Illinois, and graduated from the University of Illinois with a degree in civil engineering. He worked as an engineer for the Illinois Department of Transportation, and later as Vice President of Business Development for Clark Engineers, Inc.

== Illinois Senate ==
Risinger was elected to the Illinois Senate in 2002 after defeating Paul Mangieri. He was re-elected in 2006 and 2010, and served as the Senate Republican Caucus Chairman in 2008.

While in the Senate, Risinger's committee assignments included Environment and Energy (as minority spokesperson), Appropriations II, Financial Institutions, Local Government, and Transportation.

Risinger resigned from the Illinois Senate on February 28, 2011. Darin LaHood was appointed by the Legislative Committee of the Republican Party of the 37th Legislative District to the vacancy and sworn into office on March 1, 2011.

== Personal life ==
Risinger is married and has three children.

He serves as a member of the Executive Board for the International Construction Innovations Conference; Chairman of the National Traffic and Transportation Conference; member of the Board of the Industry Institute; member of the Executive Board of the Center for Emerging Technologies in Infrastructure; member and past chairman of advisory board for Bradley University College of Engineering and Technology; and a member of the Easter Seals Board, University of Illinois Alumni Association, Illinois Society of Professional Engineers, Illinois Association of Highway Engineers, National Society of Professional Engineers, Illinois Public Works Association, Rotary International, and a Christmas in April volunteer. He is a former Boy Scouts of America leader and school board member.
