= John Porcari =

American politician (born 1958)

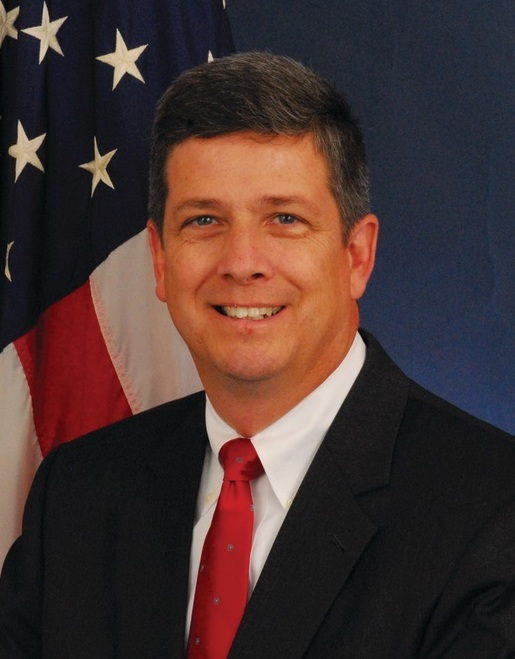

Port Envoy to the White House Supply Chain Disruptions Task Force
- In office August 27, 2021 – May 27, 2022
- President: Joe Biden
- Preceded by: Position created

10th United States Deputy Secretary of Transportation
- In office June 1, 2009 – December 27, 2013
- President: Barack Obama
- Secretary: Ray LaHood; Anthony Foxx
- Preceded by: Thomas J. Barrett
- Succeeded by: Victor Mendez

Maryland Secretary of Transportation
- In office January 17, 2007 – June 1, 2009
- Governor: Martin O'Malley
- Preceded by: Robert L. Flanagan
- Succeeded by: Beverley Swaim-Staley (acting)
- In office 1999–2003
- Governor: Parris Glendening
- Preceded by: David Winstead
- Succeeded by: Robert L. Flanagan

Personal details
- Born: December 14, 1958 (age 67) Rochester, New York, U.S.
- Party: Democratic
- Education: University of Dayton (BA); University at Albany, SUNY (MPA)

John Davis Porcari (born December 14, 1958) is an American government official and businessman who served as United States deputy secretary of transportation and Port Envoy to the White House Supply Chain Disruptions Task Force. He was nominated by the Obama administration in April 2009 and confirmed by the Senate on May 21, 2009. Porcari resigned from his position as Deputy Secretary on December 27, 2013.

== Education ==
Porcari was born in Rochester, New York. He earned a Bachelor of Arts degree in political science from the University of Dayton and a Master of Public Administration degree from the State University of New York at Albany.

== Career ==
Porcari previously served as the Deputy Secretary of the Maryland Department of Transportation in 1997 and 1998. He subsequently served as the secretary of the Maryland Department of Transportation on two occasions: first between January 1999 and January 2003 for the administration of Governor Parris Glendening, and then again from January 2007 to June 2009 for the administration of Governor Martin O'Malley. In the intervening period, he served as the vice president for administrative affairs at the University of Maryland, College Park.

=== Deputy secretary of transportation ===
Serving as deputy to Secretaries Ray LaHood and Anthony Foxx, Porcari was instrumental in implementing department programs, including over $3 billion in Transportation Investment Generating Economic Recovery (TIGER) grants (originating from the American Recovery and Reinvestment Act of 2009) and USDOT's stringent Buy America Act provisions, in place to ensure transportation projects are built by American workers using domestic materials. In addition to serving as operations officer over USDOT's more than 55,000 employees, Deputy Secretary Porcari oversaw resolution on an array of programs and issues, including the vehicle return/rebate program Cash-for-Clunkers, Toyota's recall of 2.3 million vehicles due to unexpected acceleration, and implementation of the Congressional transportation legislation Moving Ahead for Progress in the 21st Century (MAP-21).

As Deputy Secretary, Porcari has testified before Congress on multiple occasions, including seven hearings since January 2012 alone, on matters involving project delivery, the Next Generation Air Transportation System, drawdown from the Strategic Petroleum Reserve, aviation and global positioning system coordination, and rebuilding in the aftermath of Hurricane Sandy.

Following the mantra "there are no Republican potholes or Democratic potholes," In 2008, USDOT ranked last on the Partnership for Public Service’s Best Places to Work in Federal Government, and by his last week of service, the department rose to eighth. Additionally, not one of the Agency's subcomponents was listed among the study's rankings in 2009; in 2013 the Surface Transportation Board maintained its first-place ranking among small agencies, and the Federal Highway Administration reached fifth place among the 300 subcomponent agencies, improving on its ninth-place ranking in 2012.

Porcari's signature achievements at USDOT included implementation of President Obama's Executive Order 13604, an Administration effort to expedite project permitting, while delivering quality environmental outcomes. Major infrastructure projects such as replacement of the Tappan Zee Bridge, realized significant permit process savings, reducing permit time from several years to just over 12 months. As a result, the project broke ground in December 2013. Porcari also led the department's work on major projects, including the $1.7 billion transformation of the James Farley Post Office adjacent to Penn Station in midtown Manhattan to enhance transportation and develop mixed-use real estate and the construction of the planned $3.5 billion New International Trade Crossing (NITC) bridge to connect Detroit and Windsor, Ontario, a major trade corridor that carries almost a quarter of the land trade between the United States and Canada.

Porcari was the president of advisory services at WSP USA until July 2020.

=== Biden administration and private sector ===
On August 27, 2021, Porcari was appointed port envoy to the White House Supply Chain Disruptions Task Force. On May 27, 2022, the White House and Department of Transportation announced that retired General Stephen R. Lyons would take over for Porcari. Porcari works in a number of private sector roles, including President of Axilion Inc. US, Co-Founder of the Equity in Infrastructure Project, Operating Partner of Corsair Infrastructure, and Board Member for Vantage Airport Group.

== See also ==
- Maryland Department of Transportation
- Woodrow Wilson Bridge

Political offices
Preceded by Thomas J. Barrett	United States Deputy Secretary of Transportation; 2009–2013	Succeeded by Victor Mendez
