= Mary Lou Sumner =

American politician

- Born: Mary Lou Fehr; May 5, 1927; Eureka, Illinois, US
- Died: July 27, 2002 (aged 75); Mountain View, Arkansas, US

Mary Lou Sumner (née Fehr) (May 5, 1927 – July 27, 2002) was an American politician.

Born in Eureka, Illinois, Sumner went to Woodruff High School, in Peoria, Illinois. She also went to Bradley University for two years. Sumner also served on the local selective service board. Sumner founded Mary Lou Records. She lived in Dunlap, Illinois. From 1977 to 1981, Sumner served in the Illinois House of Representatives and was involved with the Republican Party. She was defeated by Don Saltsman in 1980. Sumner died in Mountain View, Arkansas.
