= Thomas J. Madison Jr. =

American civil servant (born 1966)

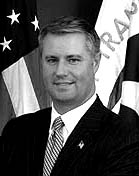

Administrator of the Federal Highway Administration
- In office August 18, 2008 – January 20, 2009
- President: George W. Bush
- Preceded by: J. Richard Capka
- Succeeded by: Victor Mendez

Personal details
- Born: January 10, 1966 (age 60) Binghamton, NY

Thomas J. Madison, Jr. (January 10, 1966) was confirmed by the United States Senate to be Administrator of the Federal Highway Administration at the U.S. Department of Transportation on August 1, 2008. He was sworn in as Administrator on August 18, 2008.

He was President of Spectra Subsurface Imaging Group, LLC and was responsible for the company's management, business development, and client relations. Spectra performs non-invasive underground mapping using ground penetrating radar (GPR), electromagnetic induction (EMI), and other advanced techniques and works with utility owners, designers, and builders in New York and New England. He also served as Vice President for Infrastructure Services of Spectra Environmental Group, Inc., an environmental and engineering consulting firm specializing in environmental compliance, natural resource permitting, construction inspection, and infrastructure engineering.

Before joining Spectra, Madison served as Commissioner of the New York State Department of Transportation (NYSDOT) where he oversaw the state's vast transportation network, including port and aviation facilities, freight and passenger rail services, local transit systems, bicycle and pedestrian programs, 237,000 lane miles, 17,500 bridges, 10,000 employees, a $7 billion annual budget, and an $18 billion capital program. Madison successfully advocated for a $2.9 billion transportation bond referendum, implemented a major state agency reorganization, and championed legislation to allow innovative financing for the construction, operation, and maintenance of public infrastructure.

Prior to his time at NYSDOT, Madison served as Deputy Secretary and principal transportation advisor to Governor George E. Pataki of New York, where he provided executive management to state transportation agencies and authorities. Additionally, he has worked as the Governor's Regional Representative, Deputy Appointments Secretary, and Director of State and Local Government Affairs. As Deputy Director of the New York State Consumer Protection Board, he helped establish the largest “Do Not Call” telemarketing sales call registry in the nation.

Madison served as Deputy County Executive in Broome County, New York, where he managed a municipal government with 40 departments, 2,500 employees, and an annual budget of more than $250 million. He began his career in public service as a Legislative Assistant to the late New York State Assemblyman Richard H. Miller, and was also Executive Assistant to New York State Senator Thomas W. Libous, the Deputy Majority Leader and Chairman of the Senate Transportation Committee.

Madison was a Director of the New York State Bridge Authority, and has previously served as Chairman of the Metropolitan Transportation Authority's Capital Program Review Board, the New York State Public Transportation Safety Board, the New York Metropolitan Transportation Council, the Greater Buffalo-Niagara Regional Transportation Council, and as a member of the Buffalo and Fort Erie Peace Bridge Authority and numerous other state and national transportation organizations.

In the private sector, Madison was a Sales Representative for Ortho-McNeil Pharmaceutical Corporation of Raritan, New Jersey and a general foreman for T.J. Madison Construction Company, Inc. of Binghamton, New York.

Madison is a 1988 graduate of the State University of New York at Geneseo, and has a Bachelor of Arts degree in Political Science with a minor in International Relations.
