= J. Richard Capka =

American Army general and government official

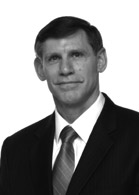

Administrator of the Federal Highway Administration
- In office May 31, 2006 – January 24, 2008
- President: George W. Bush
- Preceded by: Mary E. Peters
- Succeeded by: Thomas J. Madison Jr.

Deputy Administrator of Federal Highway Administration
- In office August 5, 2002 – May 31, 2006

Personal details
- Born: Joseph Richard Capka; March 16, 1949 (age 77) Tokyo, Japan
- Education: United States Military Academy (BS); University of California, Berkeley (ME); Chaminade University of Honolulu (MBA)

Military service
- Allegiance: United States
- Branch/service: United States Army
- Years of service: 1971–2001
- Rank: Brigadier general
- Commands: South Atlantic Division; South Pacific Division; Baltimore Engineer District; 1st Engineer Battalion; 43rd Combat Engineer Company
- Awards: Distinguished Service Medal; Defense Superior Service Medal; Legion of Merit; Meritorious Service Medal (4)

Joseph Richard "Rick" Capka (born March 16, 1949) was the Federal Highway Administrator from May 2006 to January 2008. Previously, Capka had been appointed the Deputy Administrator of the Federal Highway Administration (FHWA) in August 2002 and was the Acting Administrator since August 2005. In those capacities, he helped to prepare the Bush administration's proposed transportation reauthorization legislation; to shape the management of highway mega-projects and; to develop national programs and initiatives to relieve congestion. He was also the first U.S. Department of Transportation (USDOT) official to deploy to Iraq (2003) and led the federal response to the 2007 collapse of the I-35 W Bridge in Minneapolis.

Prior to his appointment as Deputy Administrator, Capka was chief executive officer/Executive Director of the Massachusetts Turnpike Authority (MTA) where he directed the oversight of the $14.6 billion Central Artery/Tunnel project ("Big Dig") in Boston, the largest and most complex infrastructure project of its time in the United States. In that capacity, Capka worked closely with the USDOT Inspector General, the FHWA, and other state agencies to develop and gain approval for the project's complex finance plan. The budget that Capka established in May 2001 remained on target and provided a sound foundation for the project's subsequent financial management.

Prior to his position with the MTA, Capka retired as a brigadier general in early 2001 following a 29-year military career in the U.S. Army Corps of Engineers, where he served in the U.S., Europe, the Pacific and the Far East. His most recent assignments before retirement included division engineer and commander of the U.S. Army Corps of Engineers South Atlantic Division, where he was responsible for managing the corps' activities in the southeastern U.S. and in Central and South America. He also was commander of the South Pacific Division, where he was responsible for the corps' activities in the far western and southwestern U.S. during which time he led the inter-agency efforts to restore California's vast federal flood control system that had been severely damaged following the state's unprecedented floods in 1987. That effort earned specific praise from both the President and Governor of California.

In 2008, he joined Dawson & Associates in Washington, D.C., as chief operating officer. He is a registered professional engineer in Virginia. Capka advises on federal environmental policy involving the U.S. Army Corps of Engineers and the Environmental Protection Agency.

Born to a military family in Tokyo and raised in Maryland, Capka is a 1971 graduate of the United States Military Academy with a Bachelor of Science degree. He later earned a Master of Engineering degree from the University of California, Berkeley in 1977 and an M.B.A. degree from Chaminade University of Honolulu in 1983. Capka is a 1984 graduate of the Army Command and General Staff College and a 1991 graduate of the National War College. His military awards include the Distinguished Service Medal, the Defense Superior Service Medal, the Legion of Merit and four Meritorious Service Medals.
