= Victor Mendez =

American politician

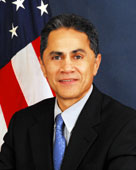

11th United States Deputy Secretary of Transportation
- In office December 27, 2013 – January 20, 2017; Acting: December 27, 2013 – July 24, 2014
- President: Barack Obama
- Preceded by: John D. Porcari
- Succeeded by: Jeffrey A. Rosen

Administrator of the Federal Highway Administration
- In office January 20, 2009 – July 24, 2014; Acting: January 20, 2009 – July 24, 2009
- President: Barack Obama
- Deputy: Gregory G. Nadeau
- Preceded by: Thomas J. Madison Jr.
- Succeeded by: Gregory G. Nadeau

Personal details
- Education: University of Texas at El Paso (BS); Arizona State University, Tempe (MBA)

Victor Mendez was the Deputy Secretary of Transportation from 2014 to 2017 and was previously sworn in on July 24, 2009, as Administrator of the Federal Highway Administration (FHWA), the 18th person to hold this position.

Mendez was previously Director of the Arizona Department of Transportation (ADOT), beginning in November 2001. Mendez started at ADOT in 1985 as a transportation engineer. He was later named deputy state engineer with ADOT's Valley Transportation Group, where he provided leadership for the Phoenix area's multibillion-dollar freeway system. He worked his way up the agency, becoming deputy director in 1999 and acting director four months before his appointment as Director.

In 2006, Mendez was elected president of both the Western Association of State Highway and Transportation Officials and the American Association of State Highway and Transportation Officials (AASHTO), its national counterpart. He chaired its Standing Committee on Research, the Operations Council of the Standing Committee on Highways, and the oversight group for the Transportation Research Board Long-Term Pavement Performance program.

As Administrator of the Federal Highway Administration, Mendez encouraged the adoption of innovations in highways and supported international cooperation. In 2011, he signed the first Memorandum of Cooperation with the Forum of European National Highway Research Laboratories.

Mendez earned a civil engineering degree from the University of Texas at El Paso and an MBA from Arizona State University. Before joining ADOT, Mendez worked for the U.S. Forest Service as an engineer in Oregon.

== Deputy Secretary of Transportation ==
On May 15, 2014, President Obama submitted his nomination to the Senate. On July 24, 2014, Mendez was confirmed by voice vote as the Deputy Secretary of Transportation.

Political offices
Preceded by Thomas J. Madison Jr.	Administrator of the Federal Highway Administration; 2009–2014	Succeeded by Gregory G. Nadeau
Preceded by John D. Porcari	United States Deputy Secretary of Transportation; 2013–2017; Acting: 2013–2014	Succeeded by Jeffrey A. Rosen
