= Gregory G. Nadeau =

American politician

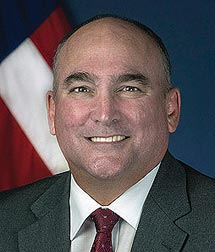

Administrator of the Federal Highway Administration
- In office August 11, 2015 – January 20, 2017; Acting: July 30, 2014 - August 11, 2015
- Preceded by: Victor Mendez
- Succeeded by: Nicole Nason

Deputy Administrator of Federal Highway Administration
- In office July 8, 2009 – July 30, 2014

Member of the Maine House of Representatives from 67th district
- In office December 5, 1984 – December 5, 1990
- Preceded by: Francis J. Perry
- Succeeded by: George F. Ricker

Member of the Maine House of Representatives from 6th district (4) of Lewiston
- In office January 3, 1979 – December 5, 1984
- Preceded by: Georgette B. Berube
- Succeeded by: Alberta M. Wentworth, Wells redistricted

Gregory G. Nadeau is an American politician and former Administrator of the Federal Highway Administration where he served from 2015 to 2017.

Nadeau carried out the duties of the Federal Highway Administrator in acting capacity from 2014 to 2015, after his predecessor Victor Mendez began serving as acting Deputy Secretary of Transportation.

He was officially sworn in as Federal Highway Administrator on August 11, 2015. He resigned on January 20, 2017, when President Donald Trump was inaugurated.

Nadeau also served on the USDOT Freight Policy Council. The Council advises the secretary on the development and implementation of MAP-21 freight policy provisions, including the National Freight Policy, advances the President's National Export Initiative, and at the request of the Chair, makes recommendations to the Secretary regarding freight policy issues.

Prior to joining FHWA, Nadeau served as the Maine Department of Transportation’s (Maine DOT) Deputy Commissioner for Policy, Planning and Communications. In this role, he was responsible for state and federal policy, statewide transportation system planning, communications, freight and business services, and passenger transportation.

Nadeau served as senior policy advisor to then Maine Governor, Angus King, from 1995 to 2002. He was responsible for a number of policy areas, including transportation, economic development, energy and utilities, environmental protection and labor. From 1979 to 1990, he represented the city of Lewiston in the Maine House of Representatives.

== Elections ==
1978 Primary Election

Maine House of Representatives District 6(4) (Lewiston) Androscoggin County Primary Election 1978:
Party	Candidate	Votes	%	±%
Democratic	Gregory G. Nadeau	609		
Democratic	George F. Ricker	434		

1978 General Election

Maine House of Representatives District 6(4) (Lewiston) Androscoggin County General Election 1978:
Party	Candidate	Votes	%	±%
Democratic	Gregory G. Nadeau	1,336		

1980 Primary Election

Maine House of Representatives District 6(4) (Lewiston) Androscoggin County Primary Election 1980:
Party	Candidate	Votes	%	±%
Democratic	Gregory G. Nadeau	595		

1980 General Election

Maine House of Representatives District 6(4) (Lewiston) Androscoggin County General Election 1980:
Party	Candidate	Votes	%	±%
Democratic	Gregory G. Nadeau	1,632		

1982 Primary Election

Maine House of Representatives District 6(4) (Lewiston) Androscoggin County Primary Election 1982:
Party	Candidate	Votes	%	±%
Democratic	Gregory G. Nadeau	676		

1982 General Election

Maine House of Representatives District 6(4) (Lewiston) Androscoggin County General Election 1982:
Party	Candidate	Votes	%	±%
Democratic	Gregory G. Nadeau	1,431		

1984 Primary

Maine House of Representatives District 67th Androscoggin County Primary Election 1984:
Party	Candidate	Votes	%	±%
Democratic	Gregory G. Nadeau	611		

1984 General Election

Maine House of Representatives District 67th Androscoggin County General Election 1984:
Party	Candidate	Votes	%	±%
Democratic	Gregory G. Nadeau	2,560		
Other	Other (Write in)	3		
