= Ricca Slone =

American politician

Member of the Illinois House of Representatives from the 92nd district
- In office 1997–2005
- Preceded by: Don Saltsman
- Succeeded by: Aaron Schock

Personal details
- Born: February 19, 1947 (age 79) Ottawa, Ontario, Canada
- Party: Democratic
- Spouse: Dr. William Berkman (div.)
- Children: 3
- Education: Washington University; University of California; Ohio State University; University of Illinois

Ricca Slone (born February 19, 1947) is a former member of the Illinois House of Representatives who represented the 92nd District from 1997 to 2005.

== Early life and education ==
Slone was born in Ottawa, Ontario and grew up in Chicago, Illinois. Slone received her B.A. from Washington University in St. Louis. She obtained an M.A. in anthropology at the University of California, Los Angeles. She also has an M.A. in public administration from Ohio State University and a J.D. from the University of Illinois College of Law. She holds an advanced certificate in international law from Chicago-Kent College of Law.

== Career ==
Slone is an attorney whose work concentrates on environmental compliance and real estate transactions for small business. She has served on the Peoria City-County Landfill Committee. Slone previously worked at the Office of Policy Development & Research at the United States Department of Housing and Urban Development. During the Reagan administration, she worked at the United States Office of Management and Budget. Slone has worked as a consultant on regional water supply policy and as a lobbyist for the Environmental Law and Policy Center. She currently serves as a lecturer in the Master of Public Policy and Administration program at Northwestern University.

== Family ==
Slone is divorced and has three children.

== Committee assignments ==
Slone served on the following committees in the Illinois General Assembly:

- Appropriations-Higher Education (Chairperson)
- Environment and Energy (Vice-Chairperson)
- Health Care Availability Access
- Housing & Urban Development
- Local Government
- Subcommittee on Electric Deregulation
- Committee of the Whole
- Subcommittee on Transit

== Electoral history ==
Slone was named Legislator of the Year by the Illinois Environmental Council. Slone served in the Illinois House of Representatives from 1997 through 2005. She lost to Republican Aaron Schock in the 2004 general election.

General Election - 11/2/2004 -Illinois General Assembly - 92nd District
Party	Candidate	Votes	%
Republican	Aaron Schock	19,719	50.3
Democratic	Ricca Slone (incumbent)	19,484	49.7
Republican gain from Democratic			
