= Joan Krupa =

American politician

Joan Gore Krupa

Member of the Illinois House of Representatives from the 92nd district
- In office January 5, 2009 – January 13, 2009
- Preceded by: Aaron Schock
- Succeeded by: Jehan Gordon

Personal details
- Party: Republican
- Children: 3

Joan Gore Krupa is an American politician, educator, and health center executive, who was a Republican member of the Illinois House of Representatives, representing the 92nd Representative District for 9 days in early 2009, after her predecessor, Aaron Schock, was sworn in as U.S. Congressman for Illinois's 18th congressional district.

== Biography ==
Krupa was born and raised in Decatur, Illinois; her father was an assistant superintendent of Decatur Public School District 61 and her mother was a kindergarten teacher.

Krupa started at Bradley University in Peoria, Illinois, at age 18, graduating from Bradley and later receiving her master's degree in counseling from Bradley as well. She was a first-grade teacher for a year then became a grade school guidance counselor, and afterwards an assistant dean of women at Bradley. She also was a part-time teacher at Illinois Central College and director of adult education at the Peoria County Jail.

Krupa was the executive director and CEO of the Heartland Community Health Clinic in Peoria, Illinois for six years, during which time the clinic became the first Federally Qualified Health Center in Peoria.

=== Political offices ===
Before running for the Illinois House, Krupa was on the Peoria County Board for two terms.

Krupa ran for the state 92nd Representative District seat in the November 2008 general elections, but lost to Democrat Jehan Gordon. However, in the same election, 92nd District incumbent Aaron Schock won the seat of Illinois's 18th congressional district. The 111th United States Congress was sworn in on January 5, 2009, and Schock vacated his state representative seat upon becoming United States Representative. The Republican Party, on the advice of Schock, appointed Krupa to serve the remainder of Schock's term in the Illinois House of Representatives, and she was sworn in about 90 minutes after Schock officially vacated. The term expired on January 13.

The first vote (HB1671) on the impeachment of Rod Blagojevich was taken during Krupa's time in office. She signed on as a sponsor of the impeachment bill and voted in favor of impeachment. Krupa also introduced a bill (HB6734) to put stricter limitations on payday loans in Illinois, but the bill expired with the end of the 95th General Assembly.
