= Don Saltsman =

American politician

Member of the Illinois House of Representatives from the 92nd district
- In office 1981–1997
- Preceded by: Mary Lou Sumner
- Succeeded by: Ricca Slone

Personal details
- Born: December 15, 1933 Peoria, Illinois
- Died: July 3, 2014 (aged 80)
- Party: Democratic Party
- Education: Illinois Central College; University of Illinois

Donald L. Saltsman (December 15, 1933 – July 3, 2014) was an American politician from Peoria, Illinois.

Born in Peoria, Illinois, Saltsman went to Illinois Central College and the University of Illinois. He was a firefighter for the City of Peoria from 1956 to 1984. For 12 years he served as the President of Associated Fire Fighters of Illinois Local 50, the union representing Peoria fire fighters.

Saltsman was elected to the 92nd District seat of the Illinois House of Representatives as a Democrat in 1980, taking office in 1981 and remaining until he was narrowly defeated in the 1996 Democratic primary election by Ricca Slone.

He died in Peoria, Illinois and buried at Peoria's Resurrection Mausoleum.
