= Darin LaHood =

American politician (born 1968)

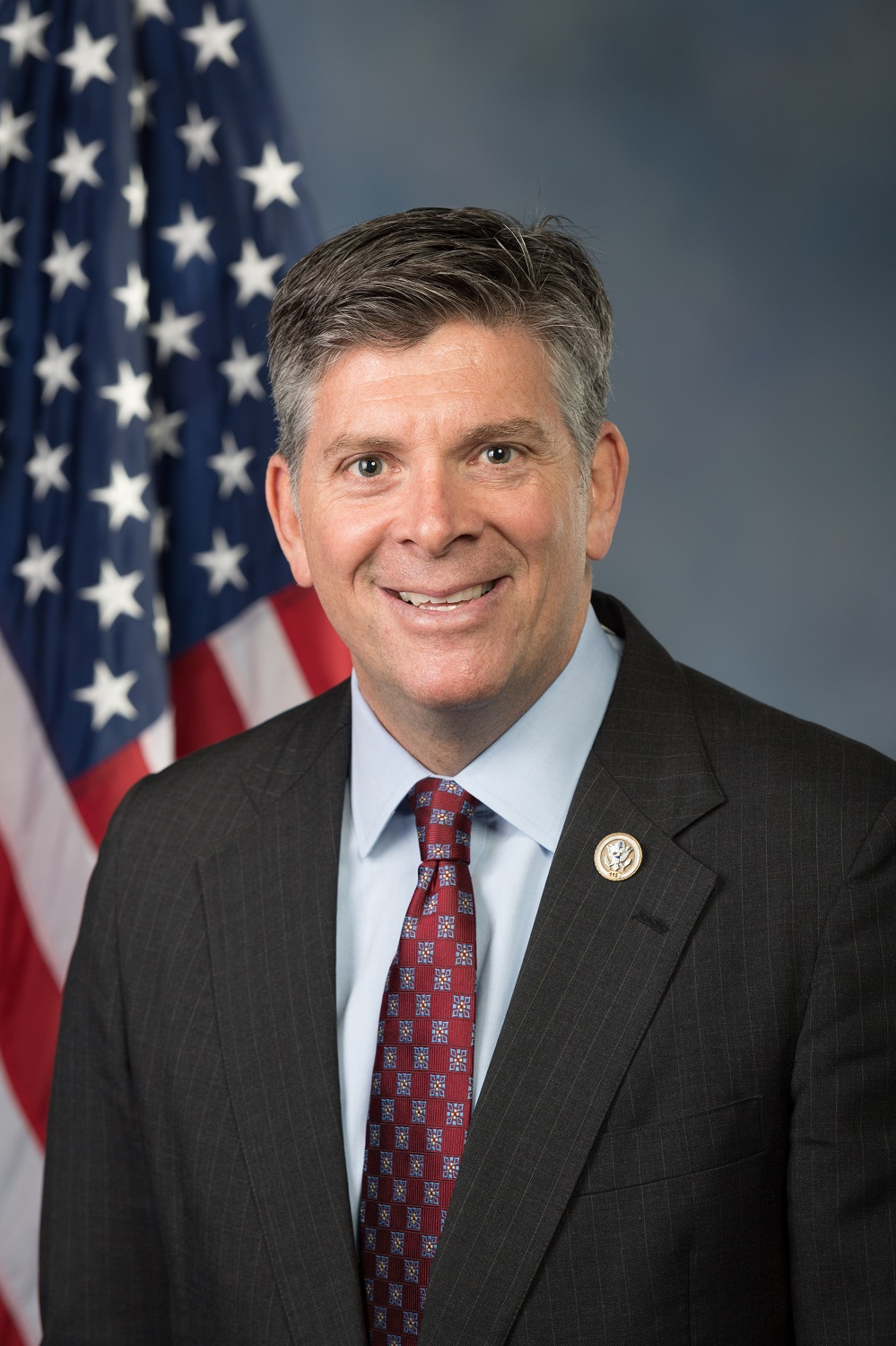
- Official portrait, 2017

Member of the U.S. House of Representatives from Illinois
- Incumbent
- Assumed office September 10, 2015 (Note: LaHood's official service begins on the date of the special election, while he was not sworn in until September 17, 2015.)
- Preceded by: Aaron Schock
- Constituency: 18th district (2015–2023); 16th district (2023–present)

Member of the Illinois Senate from the 37th district
- In office March 1, 2011 – September 10, 2015
- Preceded by: Dale Risinger
- Succeeded by: Chuck Weaver

Personal details
- Born: Darin McKay LaHood; July 5, 1968 (age 58) Peoria, Illinois, U.S.
- Party: Republican
- Spouse: Kristen Noble (m. 2001)
- Children: 3
- Parent: Ray LaHood (father)
- Education: Loras College (BA); John Marshall Law School, Chicago (JD)
- Website: House website Campaign website
- LaHood's voice LaHood on the death of Chase White, a deputy United States Marshal. Recorded January 11, 2019

Darin McKay LaHood (/ləˈhʊd/ lə-HOOD; born July 5, 1968) is an American attorney and politician who has served as a U.S. representative from Illinois since 2015. A member of the Republican Party, LaHood has represented the 16th district since 2023, and previously represented the 18th district from 2015 to 2023, a district which was once represented by House Minority Leader Robert H. Michel. The son of Republican Ray LaHood, who represented this district from 1995 until 2009, previously served in the Illinois Senate from the 37th legislative district from 2011 to 2015, before being elected to Congress in a special election following the resignation of Aaron Schock.

During the 2022 redistricting process, the 18th congressional district was eliminated as Illinois lost a seat in the apportionment process. After new district boundaries were adopted, LaHood opted to run in the 16th congressional district.

LaHood is running for reelection in the 2026 election, where he will face Democratic nominee Paul Nolley.

== Early life ==
A native of Peoria, Illinois, LaHood is the son of Kathy (Dunk) and Ray LaHood, the 16th United States secretary of transportation and before that a seven-term U.S. representative for the district his son now represents. His father is of Lebanese and German descent.

The younger LaHood is the eldest of four siblings, and went to the Academy of Our Lady/Spalding Institute. He graduated from Loras College in Iowa and received his Juris Doctor from John Marshall Law School.

== Legal career ==
LaHood was a prosecutor in the Tazewell County state's attorney's office and the United States Attorney's Office for the District of Nevada in Las Vegas. Upon returning to Peoria in 2005, he took up private law practice; as of 2011 he was in the Peoria law firm of Miller, Hall & Triggs.

== Early political career ==
LaHood ran for Peoria County state's attorney in 2008, losing to incumbent Kevin Lyons, 43,208 votes to 36,449. He was also involved in several other Republican campaigns, including Bill Brady's 2010 campaign for governor and Dan Rutherford's campaign for Illinois Treasurer.

LaHood was appointed to the Illinois Senate on February 27, 2011, at age 42. He took office on March 1, the day after Dale Risinger retired. When appointed, LaHood announced he would run for election to a full term in 2012, which he won, running unopposed.

== U.S. House of Representatives ==
=== Elections ===
2015 special

On July 7, 2015, LaHood defeated Mike Flynn 69%–28%, in the Republican primary for Illinois's 18th congressional district, replacing Aaron Schock. He defeated Democratic nominee Rob Mellon in the September 10 special general election by a large margin. He was sworn in by House Speaker John Boehner on September 17, 2015.

2016

In the November 8, 2016, general election, LaHood defeated Democratic nominee Junius Rodriguez, 250,506 votes (72.1%) to 96,770 (27.9%).

2018

In the November 6, 2018, general election, LaHood defeated Rodriguez again, 195,927 votes (67.2%) to 95,486 (32.8%).

2020

In the November 3, 2020, general election, LaHood defeated Democratic nominee George Petrilli, 261,840 votes (70.41%) to 110,039 (29.59%).

=== Tenure ===
LaHood has called himself a fiscal conservative focused on budget issues.

LaHood serves on the House Ways and Means Committee and the Committee on the Chinese Communist Party.

On May 25, 2016, LaHood introduced legislation through the Science, Space, and Technology Committee that approved the Networking and Information Technology Research and Development (NITRD) Modernization Act of 2016. The NITRD Program was originally authorized by the High Performance Computing Act of 1991. NITRD is the federal government's primary research portfolio on transformative high-end computing, high-speed networking, high capacity systems software, cybersecurity, and related advanced information technologies.

LaHood drew criticism from constituents for declining to hold an open town hall during the February 2017 recess. Constituents from across the 18th congressional district gathered in Bloomington Normal and Jacksonville to request a town hall to discuss a variety of issues, including access to health care, immigration laws, and freedom of the press. LaHood spoke to the demonstrators outside the Farm Bureau building in Peoria who had come to push for a town hall, saying: "We live in a democracy. People may not always agree with me and that's why I have to go before voters like I did in November. I was fortunate to receive 72 percent of the vote in that election. But this is part of the process." In 2025, with increasing pressure to host a town hall, Lahood insisted that he was accessible to constituents. Despite the reassurance, Lahood failed to attend a town hall hosted in his honor on March 26, 2025, in Peoria, IL.

LaHood is a member of the Republican Main Street Partnership and the Republican Study Committee.

=== Legislation ===
LaHood voted for the Tax Cuts and Jobs Act of 2017. In a letter to the editor in the State Journal Register, he stated that the bill would help his constituents save money and make businesses more competitive globally, including State Farm Insurance, John Deere, and other local businesses.

During the 116th Congress (2019-2020), LaHood cosponsored the Great American Outdoors Act H.R.1957, establishing the National Parks and Public Land Legacy Restoration Fund for priority deferred maintenance projects on federal lands managed by the National Park Service, the Forest Service, the U.S. Fish and Wildlife Service, the Bureau of Land Management, and the Bureau of Indian Education. In FY2021-FY2025, the fund will accrue up to $1.9 billion per year from revenues on federal lands and waters received from oil, gas, coal, or alternative or renewable energy development.

=== Committee assignments ===
For the 119th Congress:

- Committee on Ways and Means
  - Subcommittee on Trade
  - Subcommittee on Work and Welfare (Chair)
- Permanent Select Committee on Intelligence
  - Subcommittee on Central Intelligence Agency (Vice Chairman)
  - Subcommittee on National Intelligence Enterprise
  - Subcommittee on National Security Agency and Cyber (Chairman)
- Select Committee on Strategic Competition between the United States and the Chinese Communist Party

=== Caucus memberships ===
- Rare Disease Caucus
- United States–China Working Group

== Political positions ==
=== Environment ===
LaHood believes that humans "play a role" regarding climate change and that there is "no doubt about that." Despite this, he has a 0% lifetime rating from the League of Conservation Voters, indicating consistent votes against environmental causes.

=== Health care ===
LaHood opposes "able-bodied working men" from accessing Medicaid. He supports full repeal of the Affordable Care Act. Of single-payer healthcare, LaHood has said he would consider a bill if it were "fiscally sound" and benefited his constituents.

=== Net neutrality ===
LaHood opposes net neutrality and believes that revoking it has "zero effect" on privacy or data collection.

=== Economic issues ===
LaHood supports tax reform, specifically of corporate loopholes. In April 2017, he said he would not vote for a tax cut bill unless it was "revenue neutral" so it would not add to the deficit. However, in December, LaHood voted for the Tax Cuts and Jobs Act of 2017, which, according to the Congressional Budget Office, will add $1.414 trillion to the national debt. In 2025, LaHood supported the One Big Beautiful Bill Act, legislation that would add $3.4 trillion to the national deficit.

LaHood was among the 71 Republicans who voted against final passage of the Fiscal Responsibility Act of 2023 in the House.

=== Immigration ===
LaHood supports immigration reform, including shortening the time that it takes for people to legally enter the United States. He is "100 percent supportive" of increasing the number of people allowed to immigrate to the U.S.

LaHood voted in favor of the Secure America Act, which gave close to 70 Billion to Immigration and Customs Enforcement and Customs and Border Patrol, after the shooting of Renée Good from Immigration and Customs Enforcement. In a statement to the Journal Star LaHood said “After months of Democrats holding DHS funding hostage, putting our national security at risk and undermining the mission of the men and women who protect our borders and communities, I was proud to vote to ensure that the safety of Americans cannot be used as political leverage in the future,"

=== Donald Trump ===
In 2017, LaHood said that President Donald Trump should release his tax returns and would vote in favor of requiring such disclosure if a bill mandating it was presented to the House. Of Trump's visits to Mar-a-Lago, LaHood said that "more business should be conducted in the White House than in Florida." He supported the Special Counsel investigation into Russian interference in the 2016 presidential election.

In December 2020, LaHood was one of 126 Republican members of the House of Representatives to sign an amicus brief in support of Texas v. Pennsylvania, a lawsuit filed at the United States Supreme Court contesting the results of the 2020 presidential election, in which Joe Biden defeated Trump. The Supreme Court declined to hear the case on the basis that Texas lacked standing under Article III of the Constitution to challenge the results of an election held by another state.

On January 6, 2021, a mob of Trump supporters entered the U.S. Capitol Building while Congress was debating the Electoral College certification. LaHood and his staff were among those kept under police lockdown for over four hours. That evening, LaHood voted to certify Biden as the President-elect.

== Electoral history ==
Peoria County, Illinois State's Attorney General Election, 2008
Party	Candidate	Votes	%
Democratic	Kevin W. Lyons (incumbent)	25,548	55.57
Republican	Darin LaHood	20,429	44.43
Total votes		45,977	100.0

Illinois 37th State Senate District General Election, 2012
Party	Candidate	Votes	%
Republican	Darin LaHood (incumbent)	87,838	100.0
Total votes		87,838	100.0

Illinois 18th Congressional District Special Republican Primary, 2015
Party	Candidate	Votes	%
Republican	Darin LaHood	45,490	69.54
Republican	Michael J. Flynn	12,593	27.68
Republican	Donald Ray Rients	1,246	2.74
Republican	Robin Miller	16	0.03
Total votes		45,490	100.0

Illinois 18th Congressional District Special General Election, 2015
Party	Candidate	Votes	%
Republican	Darin LaHood	35,329	68.84
Democratic	Robert Mellon	15,979	31.14
Write-in votes	Constant "Conner" Vlakancic	7	0.01
Write-in votes	Roger K. Davis	4	0.01
Total votes		51,319	100.0

Illinois 18th Congressional District General Election, 2016
Party	Candidate	Votes	%
Republican	Darin LaHood (incumbent)	250,506	72.13
Democratic	Junius Rodriguez	96,770	27.86
Write-in votes	Don Vance	7	0.00
Total votes		347,283	100.0

Illinois 18th Congressional District Republican Primary, 2018
Party	Candidate	Votes	%
Republican	Darin LaHood (incumbent)	61,722	78.87
Republican	Donald Ray Rients	16,535	21.13
Total votes		78,257	100.0

Illinois 18th Congressional District General Election, 2018
Party	Candidate	Votes	%
Republican	Darin LaHood (incumbent)	195,927	67.23
Democratic	Junius Rodriguez	95,486	32.77
Total votes		291,413	100.0

Illinois's 18th congressional district, 2020
Party	Candidate	Votes	%
Republican	Darin LaHood (incumbent)	261,840	70.41
Democratic	George Petrilli	110,039	29.59
Total votes		371,879	100.0

Illinois's 16th congressional district, 2022
Party	Candidate	Votes	%
Republican	Darin LaHood (incumbent)	197,621	66.3
Democratic	Elizabeth Haderlein	100,325	33.7
Total votes		297,946	100.0

Illinois's 16th congressional district, 2024
Party	Candidate	Votes	%
Republican	Darin LaHood (incumbent)	310,925	99.9
Green	Scott Summers (write-in)	183	0.1
Total votes		311,108	100.0
Republican hold			

== Personal life ==
LaHood lives in Dunlap, a suburb of Peoria, with his wife Kristen; they married in 2000. They have three children.

== See also ==
- List of Arab and Middle-Eastern Americans in the United States Congress

U.S. House of Representatives
Preceded by Aaron Schock	Member of the U.S. House of Representatives from Illinois's 18th congressional district 2015–2023	Constituency abolished
Preceded by Adam Kinzinger	Member of the U.S. House of Representatives from Illinois's 16th congressional district 2023–present	Incumbent
U.S. order of precedence (ceremonial)
Preceded by Trent Kelly	United States representatives by seniority 149th	Succeeded by Warren Davidson
