= Equitable Access to Care and Health Act =

Proposed US federal legislation

- Long title: To amend section 5000A of the Internal Revenue Code of 1986 to provide an additional religious exemption from the individual health coverage mandate.
- Announced in: the 113th United States Congress
- Sponsored by: Rep. Aaron Schock (R, IL-18)
- Number of co-sponsors: 44

Codification
- Acts affected: Internal Revenue Code of 1986, Patient Protection and Affordable Care Act

Legislative history
- Introduced in the House as H.R. 1814 by Rep. Aaron Schock (R, IL-18) on April 26, 2013; Committee consideration by United States House Committee on Ways and Means

The Equitable Access to Care and Health Act (H.R. 1814) is a bill that would amend the Internal Revenue Code, with respect to minimum essential health care coverage requirements added by the Patient Protection and Affordable Care Act, to allow an additional religious exemption from such requirements for individuals whose sincerely held religious beliefs would cause them to object to medical health care provided under such coverage. Individuals could file an affidavit to get this exemption, but would lose the exemption if they went on to later use healthcare. The affidavit would be filed with their tax returns.

The bill was introduced into the United States House of Representatives during the 113th United States Congress.

== Background ==
There was a previous version of the bill in the 112th United States Congress that also had bipartisan support.

Currently, the Amish and Old Order Mennonites are exempt from the Affordable Care Act's individual mandate. This bill would extend that exemption to Christian Scientists.

== Provisions of the bill ==
This summary is based largely on the summary provided by the Congressional Research Service, a public domain source.

The Equitable Access to Care and Health Act or the EACH Act would amend the Internal Revenue Code, with respect to minimum essential health care coverage requirements added by the Patient Protection and Affordable Care Act, to allow an additional religious exemption from such requirements for individuals whose sincerely held religious beliefs would cause them to object to medical health care provided under such coverage.

The bill would define "medical health care" to mean voluntary health treatment by or supervised by a medical doctor that would be covered under minimum essential coverage that: (1) includes voluntary acute care treatment at hospital emergency rooms, walk-in clinics, or similar facilities; and (2) excludes treatment not administered or supervised by a medical doctor, physical examinations or treatment required by law or third parties, and vaccinations.

== Procedural history ==
The Equitable Access to Care and Health Act was introduced into the United States House of Representatives on April 26, 2013, by Rep. Aaron Schock (R, IL-18). It was referred to the United States House Committee on Ways and Means. On March 7, 2014, House Majority Leader Eric Cantor announced that H.R. 1814 would be considered under a suspension of the rules on March 11, 2014. By that time, the bill had received 216 co-sponsors, 78 of which were Democrats.

== Debate and discussion ==
Rep. Schock and Rep. William R. Keating (D-MA), who co-sponsored the bill at its introduction, wrote a letter in support of their bill saying, "we believe the EACH Act balances a respect for religious diversity against the need to prevent fraud and abuse."

According to Grace-Marie Turner of the National Review, that bill would not "fix" Obamacare, but would make "an important statement about bipartisan support for religious liberty."

The American Humanist Association opposed the bill and urged its members to contact their representatives and tell them to oppose the bill as well. According to the American Humanist Association, "religious freedom is being misrepresented by those who support this bill, and it’s time for those who really care about our First Amendment rights and the health of children to step up and be heard."

Actor Val Kilmer traveled to Washington, D.C., reportedly to lobby in favor of the bill. Kilmer is a Christian Scientist, one of the religious groups expected to receive an exemption to the individual mandate under this legislation.

== See also ==
- List of bills in the 113th United States Congress
