= Bob DeJaegher =

American politician (1923–2007)

Marcel Camiel "Bob" DeJaegher (December 2, 1923 – June 13, 2007) was an American politician.

Born in Moline, Illinois, DeJaegher served in the United States Navy during World War II. He was involved in the Democratic Party. From 1997 to 2005, DeJaegher served as town supervisor for the Hampton Township, Rock Island County, Illinois and on the Silvis, Illinois city council. He also served on the Rock Island County Board of Commissioners. From 1983 to 1995, DeJaegher served in the Illinois House of Representatives. He died at a hospital in Silvis, Illinois.
