= Mary E. Peters =

American government official (born 1948)

Mary Peters
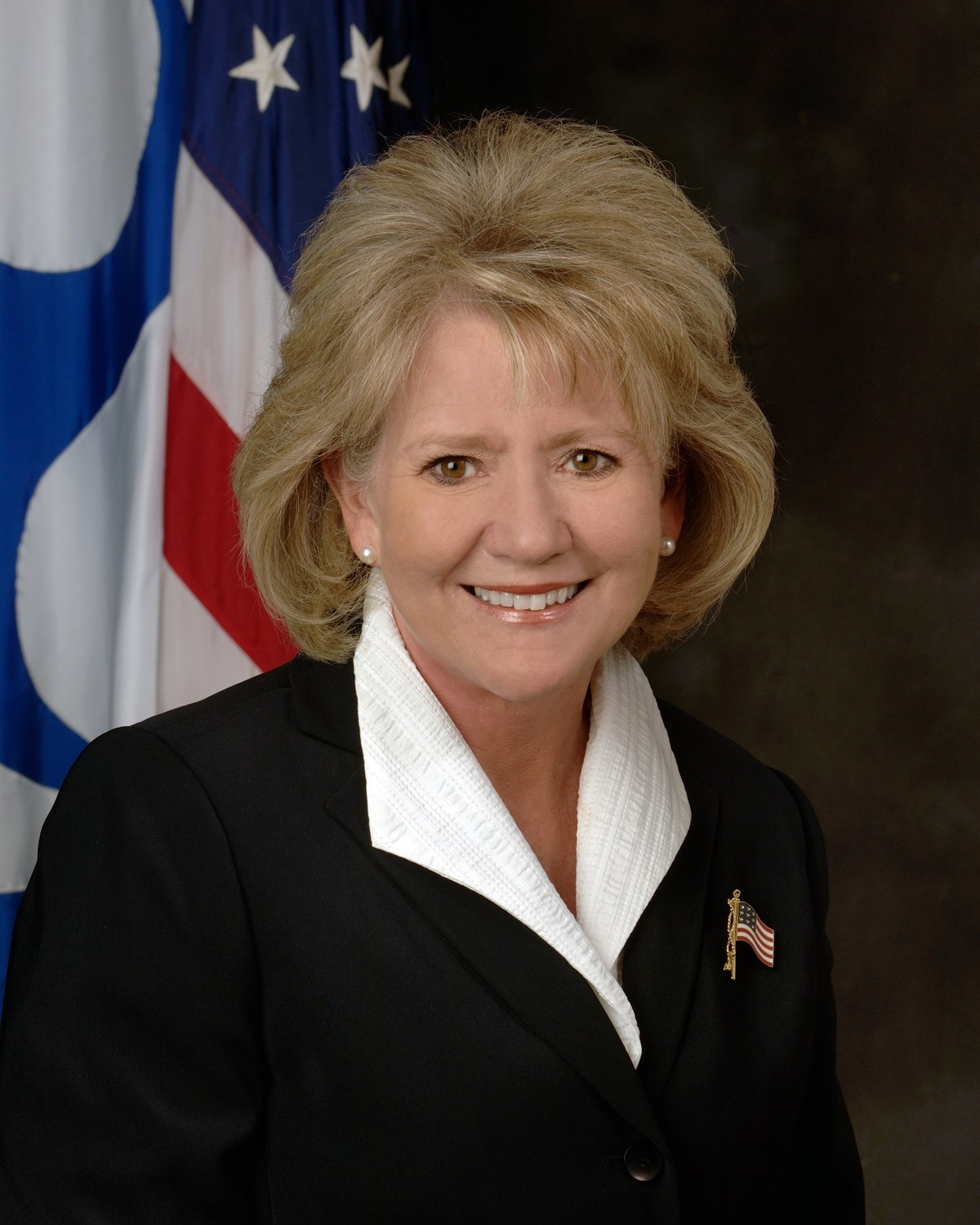
- Official portrait, 2006

15th United States Secretary of Transportation
- In office October 17, 2006 – January 20, 2009
- President: George W. Bush
- Preceded by: Maria Cino (acting)
- Succeeded by: Ray LaHood

Administrator of the Federal Highway Administration
- In office October 2, 2001 – July 29, 2005
- President: George W. Bush
- Preceded by: Kenneth R. Wykle
- Succeeded by: J. Richard Capka

Personal details
- Born: Mary Elizabeth Ruth; December 4, 1948 (age 77) Peoria, Arizona, U.S.
- Party: Republican
- Education: University of Phoenix (BA)

Mary Elizabeth Peters (née Ruth; born December 4, 1948) is an American government official who served as the 15th United States secretary of transportation from 2006 to 2009, under President George W. Bush. She was the second woman to hold that position after Elizabeth Dole.

== Early life and education ==
Peters was born in Peoria, Arizona. She received her bachelor's degree in business administration and management from the University of Phoenix and subsequently attended a three week seminar at the John F. Kennedy School of Government. When Peters was six, her parents divorced. Her father raised Mary and her three siblings in Phoenix, Arizona.

== Career ==
Peters joined the Arizona Department of Transportation in 1985, and was appointed by Gov. Jane Dee Hull to serve as its director in 1998.

After George W. Bush took office as president in 2001, Peters left for Washington to work as the Administrator of the Federal Highway Administration. She worked in that capacity until 2005.

In 2005, there was speculation that Peters would run for governor of Arizona in 2006. At the time, however, she said, while she believed she would have been a strong candidate, and was eligible to run despite having lived and registered to vote in Virginia, that questions about her eligibility would have been a distraction from the race. She was also a speculated candidate for governor in 2010, but instead served as co-chair of incumbent governor Jan Brewer's election campaign (along with former state Attorney General Grant Woods). Peters is a transportation consultant for national engineering and planning organizations.

=== Transportation Secretary ===
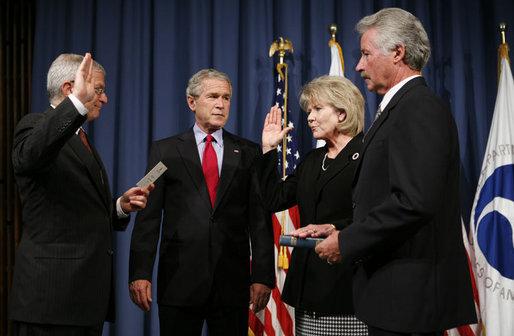
Mary Peters being sworn in as the Secretary of Transportation by White House Chief of Staff Joshua Bolten on October 17, 2006

On September 5, 2006, Bush nominated Peters to replace Norman Mineta as Secretary of Transportation. She was confirmed on September 29, 2006 by the United States Senate. In 2006, President Bush appointed Peters as the Co-Vice Chairwoman of the National Surface Transportation Policy and Revenue Study Commission. She resigned the post of Secretary of Transportation in anticipation of the in-coming Obama administration. She was succeeded by Ray LaHood, the 16th U.S. Secretary of Transportation on Thursday, January 22, 2009.

==== Policies ====
Peters is an advocate of leasing U.S. roads and interstates to private companies and having user fees (i.e., tolls) for building new highways. In an interview, Peters said that the National Highway System would run out of money by the end of the aughts without substantial changes and, rather than raise taxes, some states should turn to toll roads leased to private corporations to fill gaps.

Her policies of promoting open borders for commerce created opposition from labor unions.

Mary Peters held a press conference on September 5, 2008 to report that Highway Trust Fund payments to states, including her native Arizona, would be cut back because federal fuel tax collections were dropping.

While she was Secretary of DOT a rule was passed stating that dogs, cats, miniature horses, pigs as well as monkeys could be considered emotional support animals, and therefore could be taken by commercial airlines in the cabin.

== Personal life ==
Mary married Terry Peters, a marine, at age 17. She and Terry have three children together. In 2013, Terry was convicted of sexually abusing a seven-year-old girl, and he was sentenced to fourteen years in prison.

== See also ==
- List of female United States Cabinet members

Political offices
Preceded by Maria Cino; Acting	United States Secretary of Transportation; 2006–2009	Succeeded by Ray LaHood
U.S. order of precedence (ceremonial)
Preceded by Henry Paulson as Former U.S. Cabinet Member	Order of precedence of the United States as Former U.S. Cabinet Member	Succeeded by Robert Gates as Former U.S. Cabinet Member
