= Jehan Gordon-Booth =

American politician (born 1981)

Speaker pro tempore of the Illinois House of Representatives
- In office January 21, 2021 – January 19, 2025
- Preceded by: Position established
- Succeeded by: Kam Buckner

Member of the Illinois House of Representatives from the 92nd district
- Incumbent
- Assumed office January 13, 2009
- Preceded by: Joan Krupa

Personal details
- Born: 1981 (age 44–45) Peoria, Illinois, U.S.
- Party: Democratic
- Education: Parkland College (attended); University of Illinois, Urbana-Champaign (BA)

Jehan A. Gordon-Booth (born 1981) is a Democratic member of the Illinois House of Representatives, representing the 92nd district since 2009.

== Early life and career ==
She served on the staff of the Small Business Development Center at Bradley University. She later served as the coordinator of retention efforts at Illinois Central College. In an extension of efforts retaining students at ICC, she chaired Peoria’s Promise, which assists qualified students in applying for scholarships at ICC. She served as an elected member of the Pleasant Hill School District 69 Board of Education. Gordon-Booth was born and raised in Peoria County, Illinois, where she attended Limestone High School in Bartonville, and attended Parkland College and the University of Illinois at Urbana-Champaign.

== Legislative career ==
Gordon-Booth was elected in November 2008 to the seat being vacated by Aaron Schock. She defeated Joan Krupa, but Krupa was appointed to the seat to fill the remaining nine days of Schock's term when Schock became U.S. Representative for Illinois's 18th congressional district.

In 2018, J. B. Pritzker appointed Gordon-Booth to the gubernatorial transition's Restorative Justice and Safe Communities Committee.

As of July 3rd, 2022, Representative Gordon-Booth was a member of the following committees:

- Appropriations - Human Services Committee (HAPH)
- Appropriations - Public Safety Committee (HAPP)
- Executive Committee (HEXC)
- Redistricting Committee (HRED)
- Restorative Justice Committee (SHRJ)
- Rules Committee (HRUL)
- Special Issues (AP) Subcommittee (HAPH-ISSU)

Illinois House of Representatives
New office	Speaker pro tempore of the Illinois House of Representatives; 2021–2025	Succeeded by Kam Buckner
